= Nijgadh International Airport =

Airport development project in Nepal

Nijgadh International Airport निजगढ अन्तराष्ट्रीय विमानस्थल
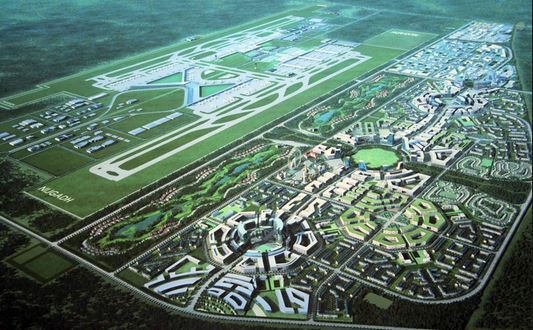
- IATA: none; ICAO: none

Summary
- Owner: Government of Nepal
- Location: Kolhabi, Madhesh Province, Nepal
- Time zone: NPT (UTC+05:45)
- Coordinates: 27°07′26.1″N 85°10′26.2″E

Map
- Location within Nepal

Nijgadh International Airport (Nepali: निजगढ अन्तराष्ट्रीय विमानस्थल) is a proposed hub-airport, located in Kolhabi, directly 68 km (42 mi) to the south of Kathmandu, near the town of Nijgadh in Madhesh Federal Province, Nepal. It is targeted to be completed by 2025 with an estimated investment of US$6.7 billion. If constructed, it would be the largest airport in South Asia and the third largest airport in the world in terms of land area. The airport is intended to relieve expected capacity restraints at Tribhuvan International Airport (TIA) in Kathmandu.

The 72.5 km long Kathmandu–Terai Madhesh Expressway is being constructed by Nepali Army to help connect the proposed airport and Kathmandu.

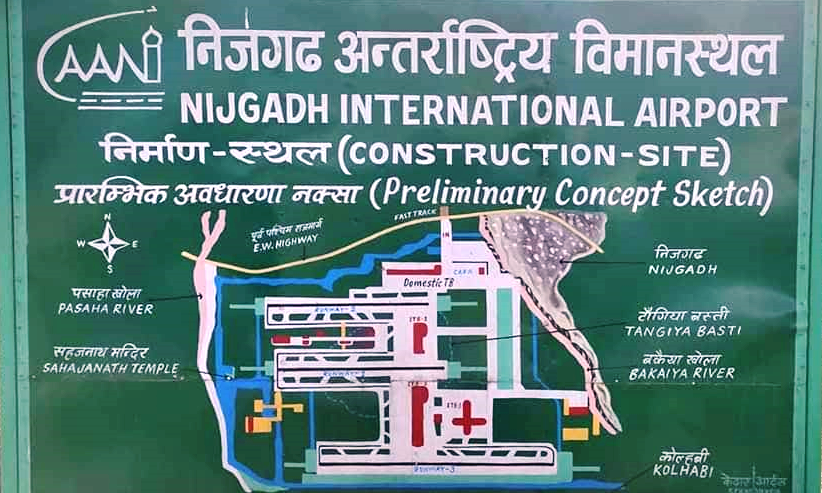
A construction area sign placed at the periphery of Nijgadh International Airport.

Supreme Court of Nepal halted the construction of project on 6 December 2019 due to an improper environmental impact assessment (EIA). On 26 March 2022, the court gave final verdict that halted all the decisions of the government to build the Nijgadh airport, currently this project is kept on hold until decision made by the parliament after reassessing it, meanwhile connecting expressway to the airport is under construction as of 2025.

== Location ==
The airport perimeter covers 80 km^{2} (8000 hectares) of land, mostly in Kolhabi Municipality, and partially in Gadhimai Municipality, Haraiya V.D.C., Kakadi V.D.C., Karaiya V.D.C. and Sapahi V.D.C. of Bara District, Madhesh Pradesh, Nepal. The site borders Mahendra Highway to the north, Bakaiya River to the east and Pasaha River to the west. The project area is situated 27 km (17 mi) north of Nepal-India border as the crow flies. The nearest border-customs to India by the road, lies approximately 53 km (33 mi) at Birgunj-Raxaul line, from where Nepal Oil Corporation imports the jet fuel.

The project area lies on a densely forested area, about 90 per cent. The tropical and sub tropical vegetation is mostly covered by Sal tree (Shorea robusta). The area is also a part of an 800 km (500 mi) green belt that extends from Uttarakhand, India to Rautahat District, Nepal. Mahabharat and Churiya range lie 23 km (14 mi) and 17 km (11 mi) respectively north of the area.

The proposed airport lies at close quarters to the navigational fixes: PARSA, OMUPA, BIRGA and GAURA, that currently provide entry waypoints to Nepal via air. Nijgadh would also be connected from the proposed air-route 'Himalaya-2', which begins from Sudurpashchim in the west of Nepal and exits from the east, continuing towards Kunming, China following the airspace of India and Myanmar.

== Background ==
The Nijgadh International Airport is being proposed as an alternative to the existing Tribhuvan International Airport (TIA) primarily due to issues such as traffic congestion, limitations in passenger capacity, and the challenge of implementing precision approach procedures at TIA caused by the terrain. TIA as of 2025 is running on a single runway of 3350m and in excess capacity. To reduce the traffic a new International terminal is under construction along with extending the parallel taxiway until full flexed functional operations in Nijgadh is commenced. However, the plan has also been centered around establishing a hub airport to accommodate the growing air traffic in the South and East Asian regions.

Before COVID-19 pandemic, Nepal's air traffic had experienced a notable growth rate of 9.2%, surpassing the average 7% growth in the Asia-Pacific region. The Civil Aviation Authority of Nepal (CAAN) reports a twofold increase in the number of passengers at TIA from 2009 to 2018, with a current capacity of approximately nine million passengers annually. Forecasts indicate that the number of passengers utilizing international airports in Nepal is projected to exceed 15 million by the year 2030.

== Timeline ==
The discussions of constructing a new international airport in Terai initiated in 1992, following the crash of Thai Airways International Flight 311 and Pakistan International Airlines Flight 268, which claimed the lives of 113 and 167 people respectively. As both accidents happened to be controlled flight into terrain, it was apparent that the topography and weather of Kathmandu posed challenges for the pilots.

In 1995, a consulting firm, NEPICO/IRAD conducted a pre-feasibility study on 8 different areas of Nepal to recommend a best site for a new international airport. Based on the geographical location, topography, distance to the largest cities, road accessibility, forest density and an airspace; NEPICO/IRAD suggested Dumbarwana V.D.C. (present day: Gadhimai Municipality) for an ideal construction site.

In 2007, National Planning Com set budget to construct the second international airport. The next year, the cabinet of Prime Minister Pushpa Kamal Dahal decided to construct the airport under 'Build Own Operate and Transfer' (BOOT) model. In March 2010, Nepal Ministry of Culture, Tourism and Civil Aviation signed a contract with a Korean company, Landmark Worldwide (LMW) to conduct a detailed feasibility study of the airport. LMW conducted the study at a cost of US$3.55 million and submitted a plan to the government on 2 August 2011. The LMW's plan stalled as the company hasn't received the payment for its study as of July 2019.

In March 2015, Turkish Airlines Flight 726 skidded off a runway during a poor visibility approach to Kathmandu, and the airport was shut down for four days. A month later, an earthquake with a magnitude of 7.8 M_{W}, followed by an aftershock of 7.3 M_{W} hit central Nepal. The general manager of TIA, Birendra Prasad Shrestha said, "if we had an alternative international airport, it would have been easier in managing distribution of relief materials effectively". Following the subsequent events, the Nepali government has been enabled to advocate for the construction of the airport.

In June 2015, the Government of Nepal authorized the Civil Aviation Authority of Nepal (CAAN) to commence land acquisition for construction of the airport. The following year, CAAN funded GEOCE Consultants (P) Ltd. from Nepal to prepare Environmental and Social Impact Assessment (ESIA). The ESIA of Nijgadh Airport was submitted in March 2018. The ESIA report estimated the cost of the entire project to be US$6.7 billion. In May 2018, the Ministry of Forests and Environment approved the Environmental Impact Assessment (EIA).

On 6 December 2019, the Supreme Court of Nepal halted the construction of airport after a group of lawyers filed a public interest litigation (PIL) citing the improper preparation of EIA. Despite the court ruling, Investment Board of Nepal proceeded with the airport project and invited bidders to submit proposals, clarifying that the court order only prohibited tree cutting and not all work. Zurich Airport International AG was selected as the sole company for a public-private partnership in the airport's construction, but after requesting a time extension due to the court order, the company did not provide any further official communication.

In 2021, the Civil Aviation Authority of Nepal (CAAN) allocated Rs. 300 million to revise the master plan for the Nijgadh airport project. However, on March 26, 2022, a final court verdict nullified all government decisions regarding the airport's construction. As of June 2022, the government's expenditure on the project has surpassed Rs. 2 billion.

== Master Plan ==
The Environmental and Social Impact Assessment outlines the construction of the project in two phases. A 3600x45 meter double runway facility with a 3600x23 meter parallel taxiway and 22 aircraft stands to accommodate 6.7 million passengers per year at an 81,000 sq. meter terminal building will be constructed at an estimated cost of US$1.172 billion in the first phase of the development. The ultimate plan is to build a 720,000 sq. meter international terminal handling 60 million passengers per year, 174 parking bays capable of accommodating Airbus A380, and two parallel 4000 meter runways.

== Conflicts ==
The project has drawn several criticisms over years for several issues.

=== Impact on environment and biodiversity ===
The project has faced disapproval nationally and internationally, particularly over the environmental concerns. The project area is a heavily forested area and the forest is known to be the last remaining native hardwood forest in the eastern Terai. The Environmental Impact Assessment showed that more than 2 million trees; scattered around the area of 8,045 hectares (19,880 acres) is expected to be cut down, preventing 22,500 tons of carbon from being sequestered every year.

Environmentalists predict that the destruction of such a large number of trees may lead to the severe flooding in Birgunj, Gadhimai, Gaur and Kalaiya area as a result of the forests not being able to absorb 650 million cubic meter of rainwater.As a solution to the destruction of forests, Nepali government has been pointing out an idea of the compensatory plantation. During an interview with BBC World Service on his visit to the United Kingdom in June 2019, Prime Minister KP Sharma Oli said, "if we cut 2.5 million trees, we can plant 5 million of them by acquiring necessary lands". Similarly, Environmental Management Planning (EMP) by GEOCE, the company that prepared EIA has proposed a plan for afforestation at a ratio of 1:25. Meanwhile, the stakeholder committee argues that the cost of plantation (US$118 million) would be a lot more than allocated in the EIA (US$2.26 million).

The proposed airport area is a home to numerous species including 700 species of birds, 23 endangered flora and 22 endangered wildlife species. The area also lies proximity to Parsa National Park, which protects endangered wildlife including Bengal Tiger and Asiatic Elephant. Parsa particularly accounts for 18 of 235 (7.7%) of the tiger population in Nepal.

The proposed airport vicinity has a higher water table which increases the chances of arsenic deposition at the downstream overtime, as the airport-activity increases. The biogeochemical cycle is also very rapid in the area.

=== Socio-economical Impacts ===
CAAN acquired 24 hectares land of Tangiya Basti for development of the airport. This left a total of 7,500 population living in 1,476 households landless and face displacement. It is said that the government had provided shelters to the flood victims from different places of Nepal in Tangiya in 1975.

== Alternatives ==
=== Murtiya ===

Sarnath Forest Development Project located in Murtiya of Sarlahi district; covers 2700 hectares of newly planted Eucalyptus. After completing her visit to the Sarnath field in October 2018, Chanda Rana, an environment activist said, "We need only 1300 hectares of land for International Airport and 600 hectares for other infrastructure. This is more than enough for Airport construction at Sarnath, Murtiya site. Why do we need 8000 hectares of jungle"? Rana along with ten other activist filed a public interest petition in September 2019 to stop the construction of airport at Nijgadh.

The petitioners who filed a separate PIL, which led the SCON to halt Nijgadh's construction, also suggested to construct the new airport in Murtiya.

=== Upgrading TIA ===
The protesters of the project have argued that the best alternative of Nijgadh airport would be upgrading the existing international airport in Kathmandu. This includes increasing length of a solely operational runway 02/20, increasing length of Taxiway 'G' to meet thresholds of the runway, extending operational hours, alleviating immigration procedures, increasing parking bays, etc.

The total aircraft movement in TIA in 2019 was 124,255. Although TIA has a capacity to accommodate 17 aircraft on its domestic parking bay, up to 35 aircraft are being accommodated. The airport observes frequent flight delays due to congestion. In response to congestion and delays in TIA, Yogesh Bhattarai, Minister of Tourism and Civil Aviation has stated that the operation of STOL aircraft that operate flights to rural airports such as Lukla, Phaplu could be shifted to Manthali; located 76 km (47 mi) east of Kathmandu. CAAN has also allowed other airlines to set up bases out of Kathmandu. Some domestic airline pilots also have asked to shift international operations after morning.

== See also ==
- Pokhara International Airport
- Gautam Buddha International Airport
- Tribhuvan International Airport
