= Tedhakatti =

Tedhakatti टेढाकट्टी
- Village
- Location in Nepal
- Country: Nepal
- Province: Madhesh Province
- District: Bara District
- Rural Municipality: Adarsh Kotwal Rural Municipality

Population (2011)
  - Total: 4,757
- Time zone: UTC+5:45 (Nepal Time)

Tedhakatti (Nepali: टेढाकट्टी) is a village located in Ward No. 5 of Adarsh Kotwal Rural Municipality in Bara District of Madhesh Province, southeastern Nepal. Prior to the administrative restructuring of Nepal in 2017, Tedhakatti was a Village Development Committee in the former Narayani Zone. After the implementation of the federal structure, the area was incorporated into Adarsh Kotwal Rural Municipality.

According to the 2011 Nepal census, the village had a population of approximately 4,757 people living in 696 households.

== Geography ==
Tedhakatti lies in the Terai region of southern Nepal. The village is surrounded by the Aadua River, which flows around the settlement and supports agriculture in the area.

Several towns and cities are located near Tedhakatti, including:

- Kalaiya – about 24 km
- Nijgadh – about 28 km
- Kolhabi – about 13 km
- Simraungadh – about 12 km
- Gaur – about 32 km
- Birgunj – about 37 km

These nearby towns serve as important commercial and transportation centers for the local population.

== Education ==
Educational facilities in the village include basic government schools such as Ne Ra Basic School Tedhakatti, which provides primary education to local students.
