= Gadhimai, Bara =

Part of Jeetpur Simara Sub-Metropolitan City in Province No. 2, Nepal

Gadhimai गढीमाई
- part of Mahagadhimai Municipality
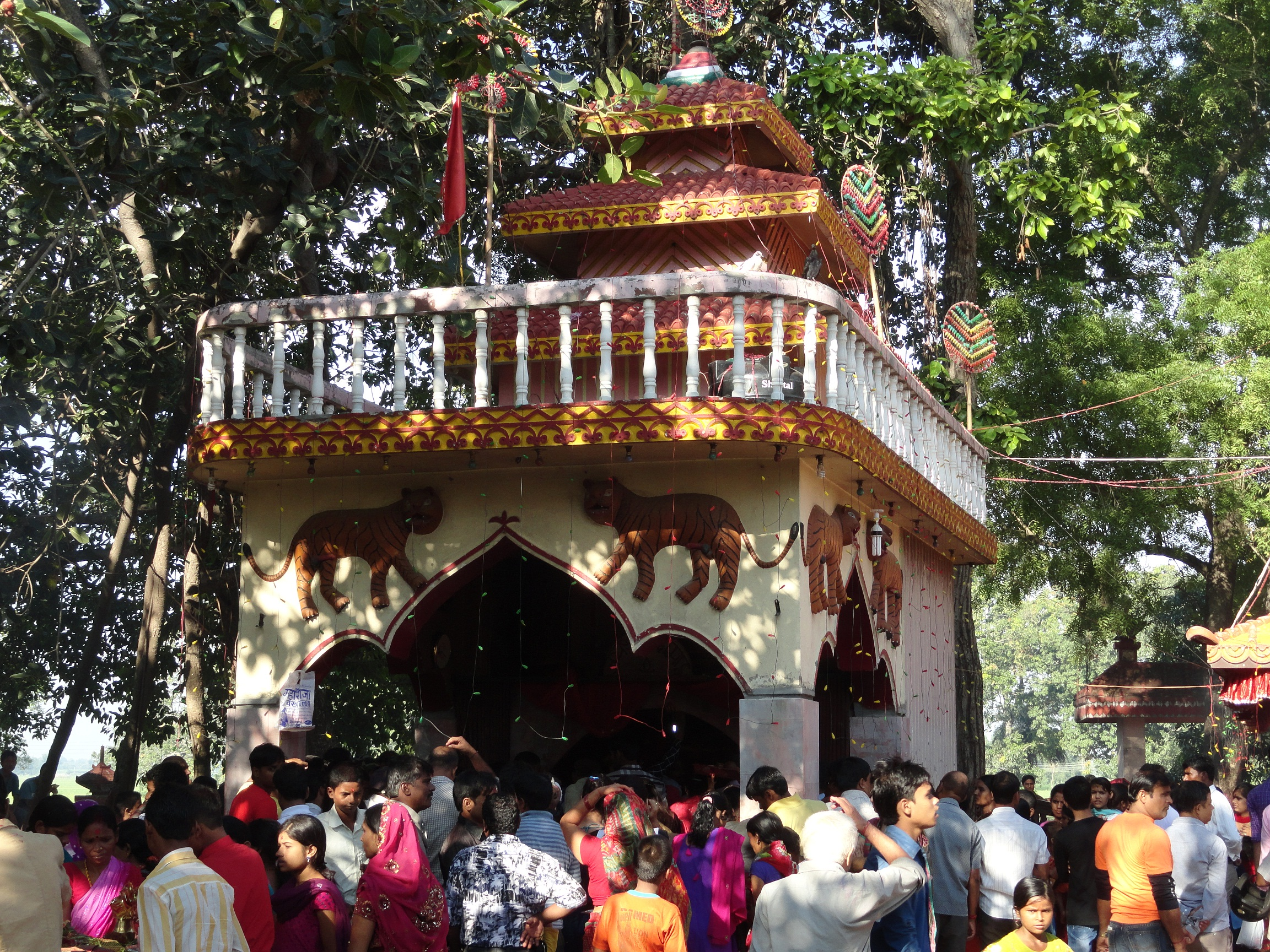
- Gadhimai Temple

- Location in Nepal
- Coordinates: 27°07′57″N 84°57′27″E
- Country: Nepal
- Province: Madhesh Province
- District: Bara District
- Elevation: 116 m (381 ft)

Population (2015)
  - Total: 83,367
- Time zone: UTC+5:45 (NST)
- Postal Code: 44417
- Website: www.gadhimaimun.gov.np

Gadhimai is a former independent municipality in Bara District in of south-eastern Nepal that was merged into Jeetpur Simara Sub-Metropolitan City on 10 March 2017. It was itself established on 18 May 2014 by merging Pipara Simara, Jitpur Bhawanipur, Chhata Pipra, Phattepur, Dumbarwana Village Development Committees.

Gadhimai is named after the famous Gadhimai Temple where historically thousands of animals have been slaughtered for sacrifice during the Gadimai Festival, most recently in 2014. In the future animal sacrifice has been banned, and the temple director Ram Chandra Shah has declared the next festival will be a "momentous celebration of life."

It is situated about 5 km south of Simara and about 13 km north of Birganj. This place is famous for the buffalo market that has its history since about 1960 A.D. Once, this place was one of the richest VDCs in Nepal. At the time of the 2015 Nepal census it had a population of 83,367.

Dumbarwana is located on the north east corner of the municipality. It's the center of agriculture. Special economic zone is under pipeline which will bring the socioeconomic changes in these communities. Protection is the sugar mill land has been a burning issue. Dumbarwana has its own college, high schools and cooperatives. It has been developing as an educational, agricultural, socioeconomic hubs in Bara district. Development of a community hospital is a growing demand of the local communities.
