= Pipra Basantapur =

Pipra Basatpur पिप्रा बसतपुर VDC
- Village Development Committee
- Location in Nepal
- Coordinates: 27.00°N 85.13°E
- Country: Nepal
- Zone: Narayani Zone
- District: Bara District
- Province: Two
- Gaunpalika: Baragadhi
- Village: Bhagwanpur

Population (1991)
  - Total: 2,922
- Time zone: UTC+5:45 (Nepal Time)

Pipra Basatpur is a town and Village Development Committee in Bara District in the Narayani Zone of south-eastern Nepal. At the time of the 1991 Nepal census it had a population of 2,922 people living in 528 individual households.
