= Pipradhi Goth =

Pipradhi Goth पिप्राढी गोठ
- Devtal Rural Municipality
- Location in Nepal
- Coordinates: 26.94°N 85.02°E
- Country: Nepal
- Zone: Narayani Zone
- District: Bara District
- Municipality: Devtal Rural Municipality

Area
  - Total: 7.8 km^{2} (3 sq mi)

Population (1991)
  - Total: 3,530
  - Density: 450/km^{2} (1,200/sq mi)
- Time zone: UTC+5:45 (Nepal Time)

Pipradhi Goth is a Devtal Rural Municipality in Bara District in the Narayani Zone of south-eastern Nepal. At the time of the 1991 Nepal census it had a population of 3,530 persons living in 527 individual households. Pipradhi Goth is the second developed village in Bara District.
