= Bhaudaha =

Bhaudaha may refer to:

- Bhaudaha, Kosi, Nepal
- Bhaudaha, Narayani, Nepal
