= Piparpati Jabdi =

Piparpati Jabdi पिपरपाती जब्दी
- Devtal Rural Municipality
- Country: Nepal
- Zone: Narayani Zone
- District: Bara District

Population (1991)
  - Total: 2,617
- Time zone: UTC+5:45 (Nepal Time)

Piparpati Jabdi is a Rural Municipality in Bara District in the Narayani Zone of south-eastern Nepal. At the time of the 1991 Nepal census it had a population of 2,617.
