= Garima Chaudhary incident =

2026 rape and murder case in Bara, Nepal

Garima Chaudhary
- Born: Bara District, Nepal
- Died: 18 August 2026; Jitpur Simara, Bara, Nepal
- Cause of death: Homicide
- Known for: Victim of the 2026 Bara rape and murder case

The Garima Chaudhary incident refers to the rape and murder of a three-year-old Tharu Indigenous girl in Bara, Nepal, which occurred in 16 August 2026. Garima Chaudhary vanished from her home in Dashdhure, Nepal. Two days later, Nepal Police discovered her body inside an empty room of a nearby abandoned house.
