= Prastoka =

Coordinates: 27.08°N 84.97°E

Prastoka प्रस्टोका
- Village Development Committee
- Interactive map of Prastoka
- Country: Nepal
- Zone: Narayani Zone
- District: Bara District

Population (1991)
  - Total: 6,222
- Time zone: UTC+5:45 (Nepal Time)

Prastoka is a town and former Village Development Committee in Bara District in the Narayani Zone of south-eastern Nepal. Now it has been subsumed in Prasauni Rural Municipality. At the time of the 1991 Nepal census it had a population of 6,222 persons living in 954 individual households.
