= Nijgadh =

Town and municipality in Madhesh, Nepal

Nijgadh निजगढ नगरपालिका
- Municipality
- Nijgadh Municipality
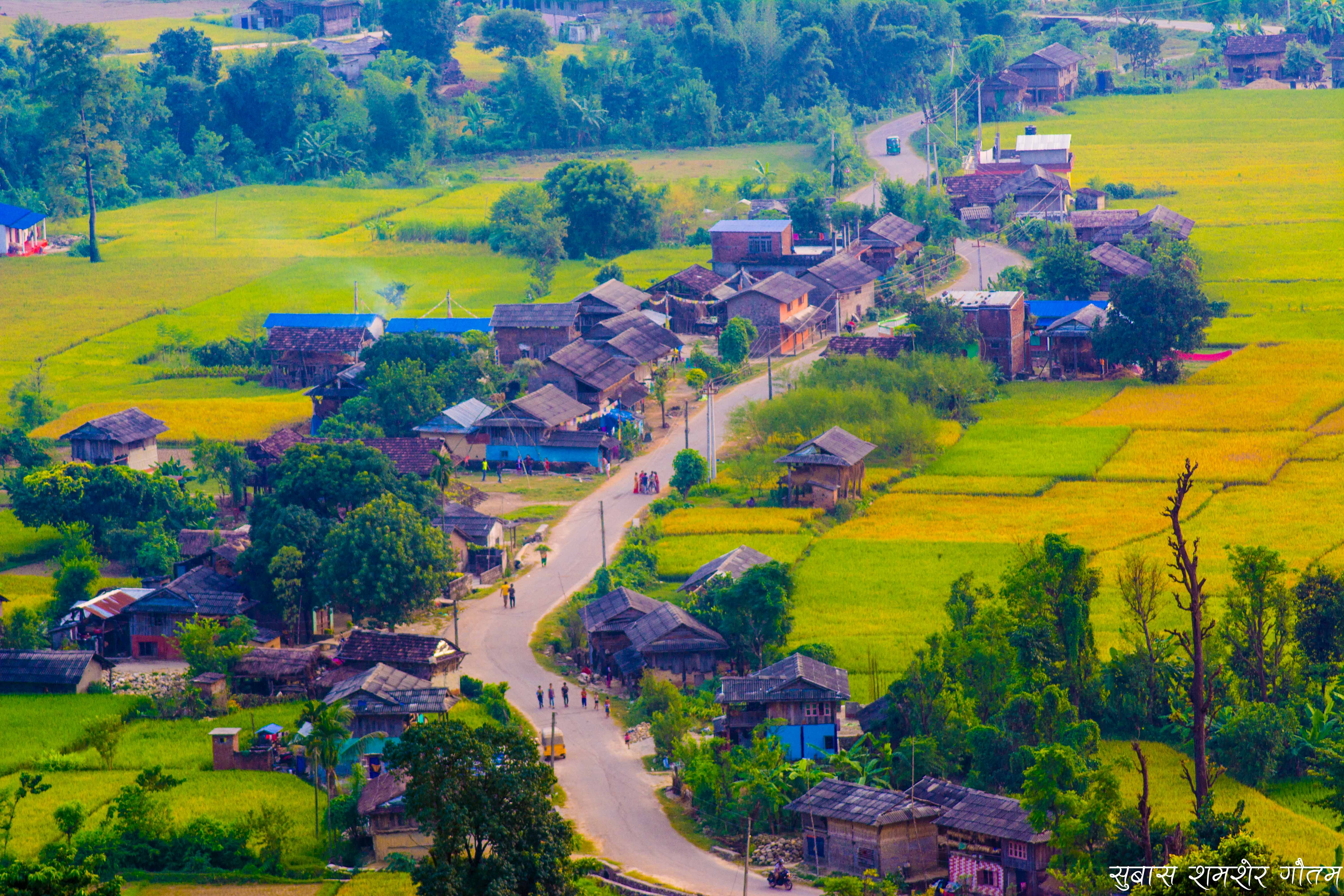

- Seal of the municipality
- Interactive map of Nijgadh
- Location in Madhesh Province Nijgadh (Nepal)
- Coordinates: 27.20°N 85.14°E
- Country: Nepal
- Province: Madhesh
- District: Bara
- Municipality established: 8 May 2014
- No. of Wards: 13

Government
  - Body: Nigadh Municipality Government
  - Mayor: Surath Puri (UML)
  - Deputy Mayor: Som Maya Theeng (UML)

Area
  - Total: 289.4 km^{2} (111.7 sq mi)
- Elevation: 192 m (630 ft)

Population (2021)
  - Total: 36,591
  - Density: 126.4/km^{2} (327.5/sq mi)
- Time zone: UTC+5:45 (NST)
- Postal code: 44401
- Area code: 053
- Website: nijgadhmun.gov.np

Nijgadh (Nepali: निजगढ, officially Nijgadh Municipality), is a town and municipality in Nepal, located in Bara District of the Madhesh Province (previously Narayani Zone of Central Development Region). The total area of the municipality is 289.4 sq. km. The municipality was formed on 8 May 2014 (25 Baisakh 2071 BS) by merging Nijgadh VDC with Ratnapuri VDC and Bharatganj Singaul VDC.

According to the preliminary report of 2021 Nepalese census, the population of the municipality is 36,591, the fifth highest in the district. It is located 135 kilometres (84 mi) south of the capital, Kathmandu, and 31 kilometres (19 mi) north of the district headquarter, Kalaiya. The Mahendra highway passes through the municipality. The nearest domestic airport, Simara Airport, is 24 kilometres (15 mi) away from the town.

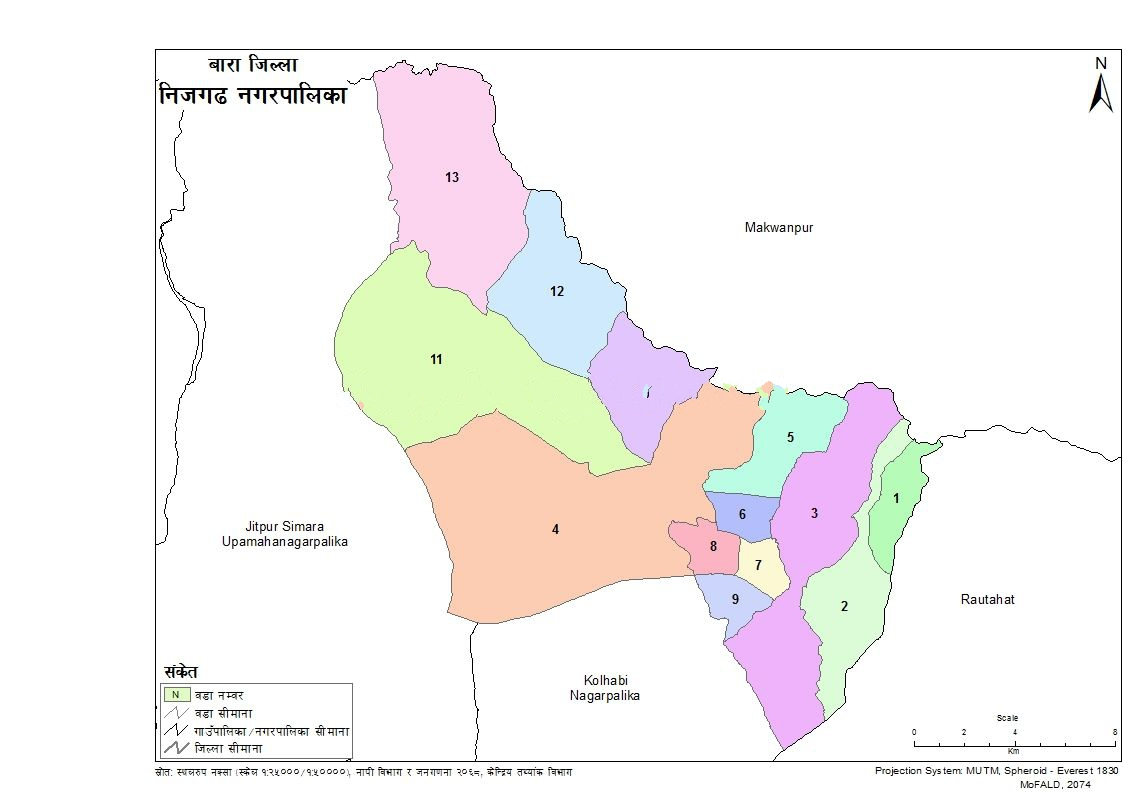
Nijgadh Municipality

== Geography ==
Nijgadh is located in the northern part of Bara district. It is surrounded by Jitpursimara Sub-Metropolitan in the west, Kolhabi municipality in the south, Bakaiya Rural Municipality of Makwanpur district in the north and Gujara municipality of Rautahat district in the east. The Mahendra Highway runs through the town.

There municipality is divided into 13 wards.

== Demographics ==
According to 2021 Nepal Census, Nijgadh has a population of 100,591 persons (18,006 males and 18,585 females) living in 7,931 individual households.

At the time of the 2011 Nepal Census, the town had a population of 19,617 persons (9,528 male and 10,089 female) living in 3,982 individual households.

== Administration ==
In the 2017 Nepalese local election, Suresh Khanal of Nepali Congress and Lila Devi Lamichhane of CPN (Unified Marxist–Leninist) were elected as the Mayor and Deputy Mayor of the municipality respectively. They were replaced by Surath Puri and Som Maya Theeng of CPN (UML) in the 2022 Nepalese local elections, who serve currently in the posts.

== Proposed international airport ==
The town has been selected as a site for an international airport that could handle 15 million passengers and even accommodate the super-jumbo Airbus A380 after the first phase of construction. As of April 2011, a feasibility study of the report was completed. The report stated that the airport would cover 3,000 hectares of land: 2,000 hectares for airport and the remaining 1,000 for the airport city.

== Education ==
There are one multi faculty governmental university campus (Gauri Shankar Campus), seven community schools, 20 basic education schools and 12 private schools in the town.

== Notable people ==
- Purusottam Poudel, who is a politician
- Ram Krishna Dhakal, who is a artist and singer
- Sanjiv Nepali, Gold medalist in the British Open Taekwondo Championship 2019.
