= List of Nepal placename etymologies =

Many places in Nepal have been given name based on mythology and other references. These original names eventually turned to give the present names. However, there prevail more than one saying on picking the origin of the names.

Different places have picked names from different languages. The preference of language depends upon the native language of the place / region. Looking towards the ancient history of Nepal, Sanskrit has been the most important sources for deriving words in Nepali Language.

== Places and their origin of name ==
Place	District	Origin of name	Original language	Description	Historical references
Pulchowk (पुलचोक)	Lalitpur	पुच: (Pucha)	Nepal Bhasa	means Park in Nepal Bhasa	
Baneshwor (बानेश्वर)	Kathmandu	बामन‌+ईश्वर	Sanskrit	Dwarf God	
Chabahil (चाबाहिल)	Kathmandu	चारू बहीः	Nepal Bhasa	Home of Charumati	
Koteshwor (कोटेश्वर)	Kathmandu	कोटी ईश्वर	Sanskrit	One Crore (10 million) Gods	
Jamal (जमल)	Kathmandu				
Telkuwa (तेलकुवा)	Bara	तेल‌ी+कुवा	Bhojpuri	Chanchal Prasad Sah from Teli (तेली) Caste had dug a well to make water available in the village and hence the name begun to attribute Chanchal Prasad and his caste	
Mustang Chowk (मुस्ताङ्ग चोक), Pokhara	Kaski	मुस्ताङ्ग+चोक	Nepali	Years ago, People from Mustang used to come and sell things there hence the name begun	
Davi’s Fall, Pokhara	Kaski		English	Swiss tourist named Davis had a sad incident in the fall which led to her death in the vary place hence the name got stuck with the locals.	
