= Metropolitan municipality =

Type of municipality established in some countries to serve a metropolitan area

A metropolitan municipality is a municipality established to serve a metropolitan area.

== Canada ==
In generic terms and in practical application within Canada, a metropolitan municipality is an urban local government with partial or complete consolidation of city and county services. The former Municipality of Metropolitan Toronto, 1954-1998, was created by partial amalgamation of the City of Toronto with neighbouring towns and townships in southerly York County, from which the metropolitan municipality was then extracted. Each jurisdiction retained a degree of local autonomy, like the City of London and the boroughs in Greater London, while the Metropolitan government replaced the old county government and supervised metro-wide services, such as police, fire and ambulance.

Conversely, a rural area (or a suburban area flanked mostly by rural areas) in which county and municipal functions are wholly or partially consolidated is a regional municipality rather than a metropolitan municipality. As with metropolitan municipalities, sub-regional communities - cities, villages, townships - within the regional municipality retain a degree of local autonomy, with the regional government focusing mostly on shared public services (police, drinking water, etc.).

== European Union ==
- Àrea Metropolitana de Barcelona
- City State of Berlin
- Brussels-Capital Region
- Metropolis GZM
- Greater Manchester
- Greater London Authority
- Metropolitan Stockholm
- South Yorkshire
- Tricity
- Grande Área Metropolitana
- Metropolitan municipalities of Italy

== Europe/Asia ==
=== Nepal ===
There are six metropolitan municipalities in Nepal, known as "Mahanagarpalika". There are another 11 sub-metropolitan municipalities called "Up-mahanagarpalika".

==== Metropolitan municipality ====
- Kathmandu
- Pokhara
- Lalitpur
- Bharatpur
- Birgunj
- Biratnagar

==== Sub-metropolitan municipality ====
- Janakpur
- Ghorahi
- Hetauda
- Dhangadhi
- Tulsipur
- Itahari
- Nepalgunj
- Butwal
- Dharan
- Kalaiya
- Jitpur Simara

=== Turkey ===
Metropolitan municipalities are a form of local government with larger jurisdiction than municipalities in Turkey. These may be formed by presidential decree in any province with a provincial population (city center + outlying districts + villages) exceeding 750.000, as per the law governing metropolitan municipalities. Metropolitan municipalities enjoy jurisdiction in provincial borders, whereas "normal" municipalities are only tasked with governing their own district or the city center respectively. Metropolitan municipalities also take on the duties of the Special Provincial Administrations (Turkish: İl Özel İdareleri) that are tasked with providing some municipal services in areas outside municipal limits. District municipalities become subordinate to the metropolitan municipality as second-level municipalities, and the metropolitan municipality takes on the name of the province. The city center is then made into its own district or districts, depending on size. As of 2022, there are 30 metropolitan municipalities in Turkey:

- Adana
- Ankara
- Antalya
- Aydın
- Balıkesir
- Bursa
- Denizli
- Diyarbakır
- Erzurum
- Eskişehir
- Gaziantep
- Hatay
- Mersin
- Istanbul
- İzmir
- Kayseri
- Kocaeli
- Konya
- Malatya
- Manisa
- Kahramanmaraş
- Mardin
- Muğla
- Ordu
- Sakarya
- Samsun
- Tekirdağ
- Trabzon
- Şanlıurfa
- Van

== See also ==
- Amalgamation (politics)
- Metropolitan county
- Metropolitan borough
- Sub-provincial city in the People's Republic of China
