= Pathora =

SukhiPathara पथरा Pathara
- Village Development Committee
- Nickname: Pathara
- Location in Nepal
- Coordinates: 26°57′N 85°7′E
- Country: Nepal
- Zone: Narayani Zone
- District: Bara District

Population (1991)
  - Total: 3,158
- Time zone: UTC+5:45 (Nepal Time)

Pathara is a town and Village Development Committee in Bara District in the Narayani Zone of south-eastern Nepal. At the time of the 1991 Nepal census it had a population of 3,158 persons living in 599 individual households.
