= Hardiya =

Hardiya may refer to:

- Hardiya, Narayani, Nepal
- Hardiya, Sagarmatha, Nepal
- Hardiya, Jagdishpur, India
- Hardiya, Tarari, India
