= Badaki Phulbariya =

Badaki Phulbariya बडकी फूलबरिया
- Village Development Committee
- Location in Nepal
- Coordinates: 26.92°N 85.00°E
- Country: Nepal
- Zone: Narayani Zone
- District: Bara District

Population (2011)
  - Total: 7,107
- Time zone: UTC+5:45 (Nepal Time)

Badaki Phulbariya is a town and Village Development Committee in Bara District in the Narayani Zone of south-eastern Nepal. At the time of the 2011 Nepal census it had a population of 7,107 persons living in 904 individual households. There were 3,739 males and 3,368 females at the time of census.
