= Narahi =

Narahi नरही
- Village Development Committee
- Nickname: हिन्दू नगर
- Location in Nepal
- Coordinates: 27.00°N 85.10°E
- Country: Nepal
- Zone: Narayani Zone
- District: Bara District

Population (1991)
  - Total: 3,299
- Time zone: UTC+5:45 (Nepal Time)

Narahi is a town and Village Development Committee in Bara District in the Narayani Zone of south-eastern Nepal. At the time of the 1991 Nepal census it had a population of 3,299 persons living in 572 individual households.
