= Purainiya =

Gamhariya
- Village Development Committee
- Location in Nepal
- Coordinates: 26.99°N 84.96°E
- Country: Nepal
- Zone: Narayani Zone
- District: Bara District

Population (2025)
  - Total: 6,000
- Time zone: UTC+5:45 (Nepal Time)

Purainiya is a town and Village Development Committee in Bara District in the Narayani Zone of south-eastern Nepal. At the time of the 1991 Nepal census it had a population of 3,670 persons living in 492 individual households.
