= Karaiyamai Rural Municipality =

Karaiyamai करैयामाई
- Rural Municipality
- Location in Nepal
- Coordinates: 27.04°N 85.07°E
- Country: Nepal
- Development Region: Central
- Zone: Narayani Zone
- District: Bara District
- Province: Province No. 2
- Established: 2016 A.D. (2073 B.S.)

Area
  - Total: 47.69 km^{2} (18.41 sq mi)

Population (2011)
  - Total: 26,400
  - Density: 554/km^{2} (1,430/sq mi)
  - Religions: Hindu Muslim Christian

Languages
  - Local: Tharu, Nepali
- Time zone: UTC+5:45 (NST)
- Postal Code: 44400
- Area code: 053
- Website: http://www.karaiyamaimun.gov.np/

Karaiyamai (Nepali: करैयामाई) is a rural municipality in Bara District in Province No. 2 of Nepal. It was formed in 2016 occupying current 8 sections (wards) from previous 8 former VDCs. It occupies an area of 47.69 km^{2} with a total population of 26,400.
