= Ganj Bhawanipur =

Coordinates: 27°1′N 85°4′E

Ganj Bhawanipur गञ्ज भवानीपुर
- Village Development Committee
- Interactive map of Ganj Bhawanipur
- Country: Nepal
- Zone: Narayani Zone
- District: Bara District

Population (2021)
  - Total: 11,000
- Time zone: UTC+5:45 (Nepal Time)

Ganj Bhawanipur is a town and village development committee in Bara District in the Narayani zone of south-eastern Nepal. At the 2011 Nepal census, it had a population of 6,355 in 910 individual households. There were 3,262 males and 3,093 females at the time of the census.
