= Jhitakaiya =

Coordinates: 26°55′N 84°59′E

South Jhitakaiya दक्षिण झिटकैया
- Village Development Committee
- Interactive map of South Jhitakaiya
- Country: Nepal
- Zone: Narayani Zone
- District: Bara District

Population (1991)
  - Total: 7,235
- Time zone: UTC+5:45 (Nepal Time)

South Jhitakaiya is a town and Village Development Committee, near by Dewapur- Chowk/Pokhara/Mandir/School/Police Station and Pashah River, Bara District in the Madhesh Province of south-eastern Nepal. At the time of the 1991 Nepal census it had a population of 7,235.
