= Balirampur =

Balirampur बलिरामपुर
- Village Development Committee
- Location in Nepal
- Coordinates: 26.99°N 85.01°E
- Country: Nepal
- Zone: Narayani Zone
- District: Bara District

Population (2011)
  - Total: 7,126
- Time zone: UTC+5:45 (Nepal Time)

Balirampur is a village and Village Development Committee in Bara District in the Narayani Zone of south-eastern Nepal. At the time of the 2011 Nepal census it had a population of 7,126 persons living in 1,014 individual households. There were 3,685 males and 3,441 females at the time of census.
