= Golaganj =

Golaganj गोलागञ्ज
- Village Development Committee
- Location in Nepal
- Coordinates: 26°53′N 85°8′E
- Country: Nepal
- Zone: Narayani Zone
- District: Bara District

Population (2011)
  - Total: 5,070
- Time zone: UTC+5:45 (Nepal Time)

Golaganj is a village and Village Development Committee in Bara District in the Narayani Zone of south-eastern Nepal. At the time of the 2011 Nepal census it had a population of 5,070 persons living in 729 individual households. There were 2,659 males and 2,411 females at the time of census.
