= Dahiyar =

Dahiyar दहियार
- Village Development Committee
- Location in Nepal
- Coordinates: 27.01°N 85.06°E
- Country: Nepal
- Zone: Narayani Zone
- District: Bara District

Population (2011)
  - Total: 7,161
- Time zone: UTC+5:45 (Nepal Time)

Dahiyar is a town and Village Development Committee in Bara District in the Narayani Zone of south-eastern Nepal. At the time of the 2011 Nepal census it had a population of 7,161 persons living in 1,134 individual households. There were 3,720 males and 3,441 females at the time of census.
