= Umarjan =

Umarjan उमार्जन
- Village Development Committee
- Location in Nepal
- Coordinates: 27.03°N 85.12°E
- Country: Nepal
- Zone: Narayani Zone
- District: Bara District

Population (1991)
  - Total: 3,845
- Time zone: UTC+5:45 (Nepal Time)

Umarjan is a town and Village Development Committee in Bara District in the Narayani Zone of south-eastern Nepal. At the time of the 1991 Nepal census it had a population of 3,845 persons living in 610 individual households.
