= Jitpursimara =

Jitpursimara जीतपुर सिमरा
- Sub-Metropolitan City
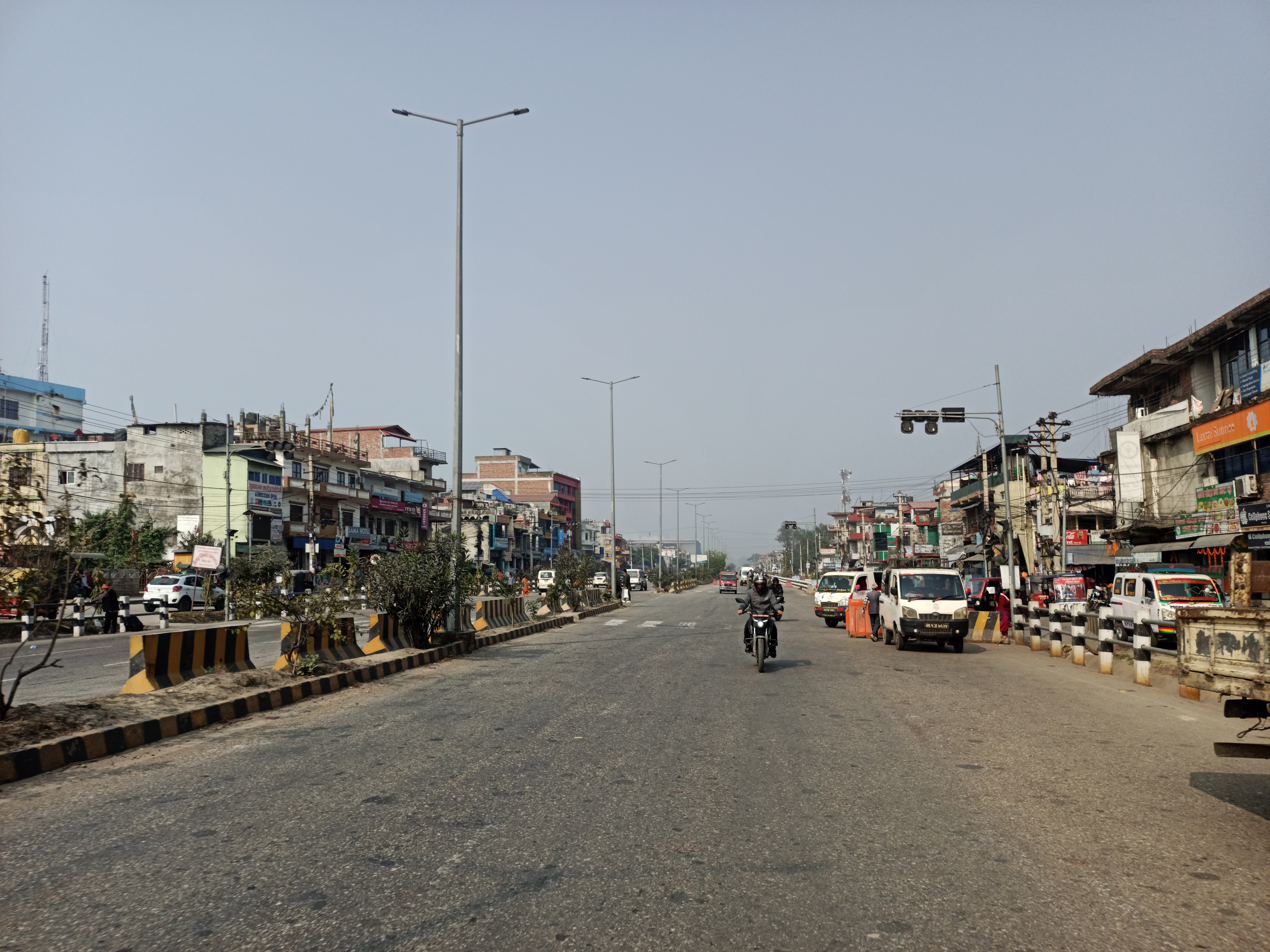
- Simara Bazar
- Nickname: Simara
- Location in Nepal
- Coordinates: 27.16°N 84.98°E
- Country: Nepal
- Province: Madhesh
- District: Bara
- Established: 10 March 2017

Government
  - Mayor: Mr.Rajan paudel (NCP)
  - Deputy Mayor: Mr Bhola Adhikari (NCP)

Area
  - Total: 309.67 km^{2} (119.56 sq mi)

Population (2011)
  - Total: 117,094
  - Density: 378.13/km^{2} (979.34/sq mi)
- Time zone: UTC+5:45 (Nepal Time)
- Area code: 053
- Website: www.jeetpursimaramun.gov.np

Jitpursimara (also Jeetpursimara or Jeetpur Simara) is a sub-metropolitan city in Bara District in Province No. 2 of southern Nepal that was formed on 10 March 2017 after merging Gadhimai Municipality, Inarwasira, Amlekhganj, as well as parts of Manharwa, Haraiya and Rampur Tokani to form a new sub-metropolitan city. At the time of the 2011 Nepal census, the former settlements that would make up the sub-metropolitan city had a joint population of 117,094 people living in 21,670 individual households.

== Geography ==
Jitpur Simara lies in the Terrai region of Nepal. To the north, it borders Hetauda Sub-metropolitan city, to south and west Birgunj Metropolitan City, and to the east Kalaiya sub-metropolitan city. It is regarded as the youngest sub-metropolitan city in the country.

=== Climate ===
The highest temperature ever recorded in Simara was 42.8 °C (109.0 °F) on 6 June 1979, while the lowest temperature ever recorded was 1.0 °C (33.8 °F) on 23 January 1985.

Climate data for Simara Airport 137m (1991-2020 normals)
Month	Jan	Feb	Mar	Apr	May	Jun	Jul	Aug	Sep	Oct	Nov	Dec	Year
Mean daily maximum °C (°F)	21.1 (70.0)	25.8 (78.4)	31.0 (87.8)	35.1 (95.2)	35.2 (95.4)	34.5 (94.1)	33.0 (91.4)	33.1 (91.6)	32.8 (91.0)	31.9 (89.4)	29.0 (84.2)	24.1 (75.4)	30.6 (87.1)
Daily mean °C (°F)	14.4 (57.9)	17.9 (64.2)	22.4 (72.3)	27.2 (81.0)	29.2 (84.6)	29.9 (85.8)	29.4 (84.9)	29.4 (84.9)	28.6 (83.5)	26.0 (78.8)	21.5 (70.7)	16.8 (62.2)	24.4 (75.9)
Mean daily minimum °C (°F)	7.6 (45.7)	9.9 (49.8)	13.8 (56.8)	19.2 (66.6)	23.2 (73.8)	25.3 (77.5)	25.7 (78.3)	25.6 (78.1)	24.4 (75.9)	20.1 (68.2)	13.9 (57.0)	9.5 (49.1)	18.2 (64.8)
Average precipitation mm (inches)	14.1 (0.56)	15.7 (0.62)	17.3 (0.68)	41.8 (1.65)	135.5 (5.33)	272.1 (10.71)	549.5 (21.63)	422.0 (16.61)	254.8 (10.03)	68.0 (2.68)	4.5 (0.18)	7.7 (0.30)	1,803 (70.98)
Average precipitation days (≥ 1.0 mm)	1.7	1.8	2.0	4.1	8.9	12.8	18.7	15.5	11.8	3.4	0.5	0.7	81.9
Source 1: Department of Hydrology and Meteorology
Source 2: World Meteorological Organization

== Infrastructure ==
Simara Airport lies in Old-Pipara Simara offering flights to Kathmandu and is the nearest airport from Kathmandu. Mahendra Highway & Tribhuvan Highway link Jitpur Simara to different regions of Nepal as well as to the Indian Border.

=== Amlekhganj Raxaul Railway ===
The Amlekhganj Raxaul railway has been a historic monument since India was a British colony. The railway was constructed to transport logs and sleepers. It led to the opening of major roads and construction of the infrastructure. This railway is at the verge of extinction due to the illegal encroachment of lands/buildings and deforestation by gangs.

=== Facilities ===
60% of the land is utilized for agriculture.

=== Parsa National Park ===
A newly founded park hosts elephants, one horned rhinoceros, "nilgai", diverse birds, python etc. The park is based on "charkose jhhadi".

== Dumarwana ==
Dumarwana is located in the north east corner of the metropolitan region. It is the center of agriculture. A special economic zone is in development. Protection and development of the sugar mill land has been controversial. It created a loss of billions rupees of taxpayer money. Illegal occupation of government lands impeded the development of the local area and caused the loss of significant agricultural jobs. The plan is to recover these encroached lands and reestablish the Birgunj Sugar Mill for farmers. Destruction of the natural forest and river by domestic and cross border gangs created flood and desertization of fertile lands. Electricity theft using unauthorized hooks disturbed electricity availability.
