= Bhaluwai Arwaliya =

Bhaluwai Bharbaliya भालुही भरवलिया
- Village Development Committee
- Location in Nepal
- Coordinates: 27.02°N 84.93°E
- Country: Nepal
- Zone: Narayani Zone
- District: Bara District

Population (1991)
  - Total: 5,414
- Time zone: UTC+5:45 (Nepal Time)

Bhaluhi Bharbaliya(भालुही भरवलिया) is a town and Village Development Committee in Bara District in the Narayani Zone of south-eastern Nepal. At the time of the 1991 Nepal census it had a population of 5,414.
