= Mahendra Adarsha =

Coordinates: 27.2000°N 85.0000°E

Mahendra Adarsha महेन्द्र आदर्श
- Village Development Committee
- Interactive map of Mahendra Adarsha
- Country: Nepal
- Zone: Narayani Zone
- District: Bara District

Population (1991)
  - Total: 3,563
- Time zone: UTC+5:45 (Nepal Time)

Mahendra Adarsha is a town and Village Development Committee in Bara District in the Narayani Zone of south-eastern Nepal. At the time of the 1991 Nepal census it had a population of 3,563 persons living in 655 individual households. The municipality is named after late king Mahendra.
