= Bandhuwan =

Coordinates: 27°1′N 85°1′E

Baghawan बघवन
- Sub - Metropolitan Kalaiya, ward no 14 as current changes.
- Interactive map of Baghawan
- Country: Nepal
- Zone: Narayani Zone
- District: Bara District

Population (2011)
  - Total: 4,678
- Time zone: UTC+5:45 (Nepal Time)

Baghawan ward no 14, sub-metropolitan Kalaiya Bara, Nepal.

Baghawan is a town and Sub metropolitan Ward no 14 Kalaiya Bara. Baghawan is lies between Kalaiya and Gadhimai temple. It's a village 3 km far from the city, kalaiya Bara District in the Narayani Zone of south-eastern Nepal. The famous and biggest Fair of Nepal is 'Gadhi Mai' fair which is just 2 km far from Baghawn. At the time of the 2011 Nepal census it had a population of 4,678 people living in 761 individual households. There were 2,315 males and 2,363 at the time of census.
