= Kathmandu–Pokhara expressway =

Proposed expressway project in Nepal

Pokhara–Kathmandu Fast Track
- Pokhara–Kathmandu Expressway

Route information
- Status: Proposed

Major junctions
- East end: Kathmandu Valley (proposed)
- West end: Pokhara Valley (proposed)

Location
- Country: Nepal
- Major cities: Kathmandu, Pokhara

Highway system
- Roads in Nepal

The Pokhara–Kathmandu Fast Track is a proposed high‑speed expressway intended to connect Nepal’s capital, Kathmandu, with the major metropolitan city of Pokhara. The project is envisioned as a strategic extension of Nepal’s national expressway network, complementing the ongoing Kathmandu–Terai/Madhesh Fast Track, which is being constructed under the management of the Nepali Army. The expressway is expected to significantly reduce travel time between the two cities, enhance regional connectivity, and support tourism and economic development.

== Background ==
The concept of a Kathmandu–Pokhara expressway has been discussed in Nepal for several years as part of a broader plan to modernize national east–west and north–south transport corridors. The government has prioritized expressway development as a means to reduce travel time, improve logistics, and support economic growth. The Kathmandu–Terai/Madhesh Fast Track, which serves as a model for high‑speed road construction in Nepal, has been designated an “infrastructure of national pride” and is being built to international standards.

== Proposed Route ==
The Pokhara–Kathmandu Fast Track is expected to run between Kathmandu Valley and Pokhara Valley, providing a direct, high‑speed alternative to the existing Prithvi Highway. While the detailed alignment has not been finalized publicly, the project is anticipated to include multiple tunnels and bridges due to the mountainous terrain between the two cities. Similar expressway projects in Nepal, such as the Kathmandu–Terai/Madhesh Fast Track, include extensive tunnel systems and high‑elevation bridges to maintain design speed and reduce travel distance.

== Relation to Kathmandu–Terai/Madhesh Fast Track ==
The Kathmandu–Terai/Madhesh Fast Track (KTFT) is Nepal’s first major expressway project, spanning approximately 71 km and featuring seven tunnels and 89 planned bridges. As of early 2025, the KTFT had achieved 37.6% physical progress and 39.56% financial progress. The Pokhara–Kathmandu Fast Track is expected to follow similar engineering standards and may be developed under comparable institutional arrangements.

== Expected Benefits ==
The expressway is expected to:

- Reduce Kathmandu–Pokhara travel time significantly compared to the existing Prithvi Highway.
- Improve tourism access to Pokhara, a major gateway to the Annapurna region.
- Strengthen national connectivity by linking two major urban centers.
- Support economic development through improved logistics and mobility.

== Challenges ==
Large‑scale expressway projects in Nepal face challenges including land acquisition, environmental impact assessments, high construction costs, and complex engineering requirements. The Kathmandu–Terai/Madhesh Fast Track has experienced multiple deadline extensions and cost escalations, with its estimated cost rising from NPR 70 billion in 2008 to NPR 211 billion by 2023. Similar challenges are anticipated for the Pokhara–Kathmandu Fast Track once construction begins.

== See also ==
- Kathmandu–Terai Expressway
- Prithvi Highway
- Transport in Nepal
