= Avab =

Coordinates: 27.05°N 85.17°E

Avab अवब
- Village Development Committee
- Interactive map of Avab
- Country: Nepal
- Zone: Narayani Zone
- District: Bara District

Population (2011)
  - Total: 5,258
- Time zone: UTC+5:45 (Nepal Time)

Avab is a town and Village Development Committee in Bara District in the Narayani Zone of south-eastern Nepal. At the time of the 2011 Nepal census it had a population of 5,258 people living in 928 individual households. There were 2,566 males and 2,692 females at the time of census.
