= Lipanimal =

Lipanimal लिपानिमल
- Village Development Committee
- Location in Nepal
- Coordinates: 27.06°N 84.92°E
- Country: Nepal
- Zone: Narayani Zone
- District: Bara District

Population (1991)
  - Total: 4,177
- Time zone: UTC+5:45 (Nepal Time)
- Social Activist - Mr. Sochan Yadav

Lipanimal is a town and Village Development Committee in the Bara District of the Narayani Zone of south-eastern Nepal. At the time of the 1991 Nepal census it had a population of 4,177 persons living in 628 households. Jitendra Sonal is the politician from this village and is also the member of provincial assembly of a Madhesh state. Lipanimal has a high school called Shree Bhoj Bhagat higher secondary school.
