= Khopawa =

Khopawa खोपावा
- Village development committee
- Location in Nepal
- Coordinates: 27.01°N 85.13°E
- Country: Nepal
- Zone: Narayani Zone
- District: Bara District

Population (1991)
  - Total: 3,162
- Time zone: UTC+5:45 (Nepal Time)

Khopawa is a town and village development committee in Bara District in the Narayani Zone of south-eastern Nepal. At the time of the 1991 Nepal census it had a population of 3,162 persons living in 587 individual households.
