= Bahuari =

Badki Bahuari बादकि बहुआरी
- Village Development Committee
- Location in Nepal
- Coordinates: 27.04°N 84.91°E
- Country: Nepal
- Zone: Narayani Zone
- District: Bara District

Population (2011)
  - Total: 4,965
- Time zone: UTC+5:45 (Nepal Time)

Badki Bahuari is a town and Village Development Committee in Bara District in the Narayani Zone of south-eastern Nepal. At the time of the 2011 Nepal census it had a population of 4,965 persons living in 646 individual households. There were 2,574 males and 2,391 females at the time of census.
