= Bishnupur, Bara =

Bishnupur विष्णुपुर
- Village Development Committee
- Location in Nepal
- Coordinates: 26.883493°N 85.083275°E
- Country: Nepal
- Zone: Narayani Zone
- District: Bara District

Population (1991)
  - Total: 2,444
- Time zone: UTC+5:45 (Nepal Time)
- Postal code: 56409
- Area code: 031

Bishnupur is a village and village development committee in Bara District in the Narayani Zone of south-eastern Nepal. At the time of the 1991 Nepal census it had a population of 2,444 persons living in 344 individual households.
