= Batara, Nepal =

Batara, Nepal बतरा
- Village Development Committee
- Location in Nepal
- Coordinates: 26.99°N 84.93°E
- Country: Nepal
- Zone: Narayani Zone
- District: Bara District

Population (1991)
  - Total: 2,500
- Time zone: UTC+5:45 (Nepal Time)

Batara is a village and Village Development Committee in Bara District in the Narayani Zone of south-eastern Nepal. At the time of the 1991 Nepal census it had a population of 2,500 persons living in 411 individual households.
