= Srinagar Bairiya =

Srinagar Bairiya श्रीनगर बैरिया
- Village Development Committee
- Location in Nepal
- Coordinates: 26.90°N 85.10°E
- Country: Nepal
- Zone: Narayani Zone
- District: Bara District

Population (1991)
  - Total: 2,635
- Time zone: UTC+5:45 (Nepal Time)

Srinagar Bairiya is a town and Village Development Committee in Bara District in the Narayani Zone of south-eastern Nepal. At the time of the 1991 Nepal census it had a population of 2,635 persons living in 431 individual households.
