= Karaiya, Bara =

Coordinates: 27°2′N 85°4′E

Karaiya करैया
- Village Development Committee
- Interactive map of Karaiya
- Country: Nepal
- Zone: Narayani Zone
- District: Bara District

Population (1991)
  - Total: 3,421
- Time zone: UTC+5:45 (Nepal Time)

Karaiya is a town and Village Development Committee in Bara District in the Narayani Zone of south-eastern Nepal. At the time of the 1991 Nepal census it had a population of 3,421 persons residing in 623 individual households.
