= Piparpati Ek =

Piparpati Ek पिपरपाती एक
- Village Development Committee
- Country: Nepal
- Zone: Narayani Zone
- District: Bara District

Population (1991)
  - Total: 2,106
- Time zone: UTC+5:45 (Nepal Time)

Piparpati Ek is a village and Village Development Committee in Bara District in the Narayani Zone of south-eastern Nepal. At the time of the 2021 Nepal census it had a population of 5,526 people living in 805 individual households.
