= Bhuluhi Marwaliya =

Bhuluhi Marwaliya भुलुही मर्वालिया
- Village Development Committee
- Country: Nepal
- Zone: Narayani Zone
- District: Bara District

Population (1991)
  - Total: 4,162
- Time zone: UTC+5:45 (Nepal Time)

Bhuluhi Marwaliya is a town and Village Development Committee in Bara District in the Narayani Zone of south-eastern Nepal. At the time of the 1991 Nepal census, it had a population of 4,162 persons living in 654 individual households.
