= Lakshmipur Kotwali =

Coordinates: 26°55′N 85°6′E

Lakshmipur Kotwali लक्ष्मीपुर कोतवाली
- Village Development Committee
- Interactive map of Lakshmipur Kotwali
- Country: Nepal
- Zone: Narayani Zone
- District: Bara District

Population (1991)
  - Total: 2,372
- Time zone: UTC+5:45 (Nepal Time)

Lakshmipur Kotwali is a village and Village Development Committee in Bara District in the Narayani Zone of south-eastern Nepal. At the time of the 1991 Nepal census it had a population of 2,372 persons living in 382 individual households.
