= Kachorwa =

Kachorwa कचोर्वा kachorwa
- Village Development Committee
- Location in Nepal
- Coordinates: 26.88°N 85.16°E
- Country: Nepal
- Zone: Narayani Zone
- District: Bara District
- Established: 1995

Government
  - Type: Local government

Area
  - Total: 1,200 km^{2} (460 sq mi)

Population (1991)
  - Total: 8,208
  - Density: 6.9/km^{2} (18/sq mi)
- Time zone: UTC+5:45 (Nepal Time)
  - Summer (DST): UTC+5:45 (Nepal Time)
- Postal code: 44403
- Area code: 053
- Mukesh Shah: Kachorwa

Kachorwa is a town and Village Development Committee in Bara District in the Narayani Zone of south-eastern Nepal. At the time of the 1991 Nepal census it had a population of 8,208 persons living in 1410 individual households.
