= Banjariya, Bara =

Coordinates: 27°4′N 84°58′E

Banjariya बञ्जरिया
- Village Development Committee
- Interactive map of Banjariya
- Country: Nepal
- Zone: Narayani Zone
- District: Bara District

Population (2011)
  - Total: 5,999
- Time zone: UTC+5:45 (Nepal Time)

Banjariya is a town and Village Development Committee in Bara District in the Narayani Zone of south-eastern Nepal. At the time of the 2011 Nepal census it had a population of 5,999 persons residing in 835 individual households. There were 3,020 males and 2,979 females at the time of census.
