= Khutwajabdi =

Khutwajabdi खुतवाजब्दी
- Village Development Committee
- Location in Nepal
- Coordinates: 27.04°N 84.94°E
- Country: Nepal
- Zone: Narayani Zone
- District: Bara District

Population (1991)
  - Total: 2,935
- Time zone: UTC+5:45 (Nepal Time)

Khutwajabdi is a town and Village Development Committee in Bara District in the Narayani Zone of south-eastern Nepal. At the time of the 1991 Nepal census it had a population of 2,935 persons living in 484 individual households.
