= Raghunathpur, Bara =

Coordinates: 27°1′N 84°58′E

Raghunathpur, Narayani रघुनाथपुर
- Village Development Committee
- Interactive map of Raghunathpur, Narayani
- Country: Nepal
- Zone: Narayani Zone
- District: Bara District

Population (1991)
  - Total: 3,037
- Time zone: UTC+5:45 (Nepal Time)

Raghunathpur is a Village Development Committee (consisting Pachayanpur, Inarwa and ) in Bara District in the Narayani Zone of south-eastern Nepal. At the time of the 1991 Nepal census it had a population of 3,037 persons residing in 471 individual households.
