= Dohari =

Dohari दोहरी Kalaiya-2, DOhari
- Village Development Committee
- Location in Nepal
- Coordinates: 27.03°N 85.02°E
- Country: Nepal
- Zone: Narayani Zone
- District: Bara District

Population (2011)
  - Total: 4,822
- Time zone: UTC+5:45 (Nepal Time)

Dohari is a small town in Kalaiya Sub-Metropolitan city, in Bara District, Narayani Zone, Nepal. It used to be a Village Development Committee before it was incorporated into the Kalaiya Sub-Metro. It lies in the south-eastern Nepal. At the time of the 2011 Nepal census it had a population of 4,822 persons living in 700 individual households. There were 2,511 males and 2,311 females at the time of the census. There are a few school in Dohari. Shree Amar Higher Secondary School is the government-owned oldest high school. It was established in 2011 B.S. Suhani English Boarding School (SEBS) is a privately owned school that was established in 2069 B.S.
