= Sinhasani =

Sinhasani सिन्हासानी
- Village Development Committee
- Location in Nepal
- Coordinates: 27.02°N 85.17°E
- Country: Nepal
- Zone: Narayani Zone
- District: Bara District

Population (1991)
  - Total: 3,520
- Time zone: UTC+5:45 (Nepal Time)

Sinhasani is a town and Village Development Committee in Bara District in the Narayani Zone of south-eastern Nepal. At the time of the 1991 Nepal census it had a population of 3,520 persons living in 589 individual households.
