= Hariharpur, Bara =

Hariharpur हरिहरपुर
- Village Development Committee
- Location in Nepal
- Coordinates: 26°54′06″N 85°07′10″E
- Country: Nepal
- Zone: Narayani Zone
- District: Bara District

Population (2011)
  - Total: 5,458
- Time zone: UTC+5:45 (Nepal Time)

Hariharpur is a town and Village Development Committee in Bara District in the Narayani Zone of south-eastern Nepal. At the time of the 2011 Nepal census it had a population of 5,458 persons living in 804 individual households. There were 2,832 males and 2,626 females at the time of census.
