= Bishnupurwa =

Coordinates: 26°59′N 85°9′E

Bishnupurwa विष्णुपुर्वा
- Village Development Committee
- Interactive map of Bishnupurwa
- Country: Nepal
- Zone: Narayani Zone
- District: Bara District

Population (1991)
  - Total: 3,606
- Time zone: UTC+5:45 (Nepal Time)

Bishnupurwa is a town and Village Development Committee in Bara District in the Narayani Zone of south-eastern Nepal. At the time of the 1991 Nepal census it had a population of 3,606 persons living in 617 individual households.
