= Piprabirta =

Coordinates: 26°57′0″N 85°4′0″E

baluwa baluwa
- Village Development Committee
- Interactive map of baluwa
- Country: Nepal
- Zone: Narayani Zone
- District: Bara District

Population (1991)
  - Total: 3,162
- Time zone: UTC+5:45 (Nepal Time)

Piprabirta is a town and Village Development Committee in Bara District in the Narayani Zone of south-eastern Nepal. At the time of the 1991 Nepal census it had a population of 3,162 persons living in 537 individual households.
