= Rauwahi =

Rauwahi रौवाही
- Village Development Committee
- Location in Nepal
- Coordinates: 26.97°N 85.03°E
- Country: Nepal
- Zone: Narayani Zone
- District: Bara District

Population (1991)
  - Total: 2,414
- Time zone: UTC+5:45 (Nepal Time)

Rauwahi is a town and Village Development Committee in Bara District in the Narayani Zone of south-eastern Nepal. At the time of the 1991 Nepal census it had a population of 2,414 persons living in 407 individual households.
