= Paterwa =

Paterwa may refer to:

- Paterwa, Janakpur, Nepal
- Paterwa, Narayani, Nepal
- Paterwa, Sagarmatha, Nepal
