= Maini, Nepal =

Village in Nepal

Maini, Nepal मैनी
- Village Development Committee
- Country: Nepal
- Zone: Narayani Zone
- District: Bara District

Population (1991)
  - Total: 2,469
- Time zone: UTC+5:45 (Nepal Time)

Maini is a village and Village Development Committee in Bara District in the Narayani Zone of south-eastern Nepal. At the time of the 1991 Nepal census it had a population of 2,469 persons living in 355 individual households.
