= Brahmapuri, Bara =

Brahmapuri, Nepal ब्रह्मापुरी
- Village Development Committee
- Country: Nepal
- Zone: Narayani Zone
- District: Bara District

Population (1991)
  - Total: 3,326
- Time zone: UTC+5:45 (Nepal Time)

Brahmapuri is a town and Village Development Committee in Bara District in the Narayani Zone of south-eastern Nepal. At the time of the 1991 Nepal census it had a population of 3,326 persons residing in 491 individual households.
