= Dewapur =

Dewapur देवापुर Dewapur (Tenta)
- Village Development Committee
- Dewapur
- Nickname: टेंटा
- Location in Nepal
- Coordinates: 26.92°N 85.14°E
- Country: Nepal
- Zone: Narayani Zone
- District: Bara District

Population (2011)
  - Total: 4,716
- Time zone: UTC+5:45 (Nepal Time)
- Postal code: 44400

Dewapur is a village and Village Development Committee in Bara District in the Narayani Zone of south-eastern Nepal. At the time of the 2011 Nepal census it had a population of 4,716 persons living in 642 individual households. There were 2,432 males and 2,284 females at the time of census.
