= Bishrampur Rural Municipality =

Bishrampur विश्रामपुर
- Rural Municipality
- Location in Nepal
- Coordinates: 26.98°N 84.87°E
- Country: Nepal
- Development Region: Central
- Zone: Narayani Zone
- District: Bara District
- Province: Province No. 2
- Established: 2016 A.D. (2073 B.S.)

Government
  - Mayor: zulfakar Ali bhuto (lospa)
  - Deputy Mayor: Upamayor Priyanka Devi Krishna prasad shah (lospa)

Area
  - Total: 19.81 km^{2} (7.65 sq mi)

Population (2011)
  - Total: 23,785
  - Density: 1,201/km^{2} (3,110/sq mi)
  - Religions: Hindu Muslim Christian

Languages
  - Local: Maithili, Tharu, Nepali
- Time zone: UTC+5:45 (NST)
- Postal Code: 44400
- Area code: 053
- Website: www.bishrampurmun.gov.np

Bishrampur (Nepali: विश्रामपुर) is a rural municipality in Bara District in Province No. 2 of Nepal. It was formed in 2016 occupying current 5 sections (wards) from previous 5 former VDCs. It occupies an area of 19.81 km^{2} with a total population of 23,785.
