= Chhatawa =

Chhatawa छतवा
- Village Development Committee
- Location in Nepal
- Coordinates: 26.97°N 84.93°E
- Country: Nepal
- Zone: Narayani Zone
- District: Bara District

Population (2011)
  - Total: 5,660
- Time zone: UTC+5:45 (Nepal Time)

Chhatawa is a town and Village Development Committee in Bara District in the Narayani Zone of south-eastern Nepal. At the time of the 2011 Nepal census it had a population of 5,660 persons living in 771 individual households. There were 2,992 males and 2,668 females at the time of census.
