= Parwanipur Rural Municipality =

Parwanipur परवानीपुर
- Rural Municipality
- Nickname: Industrial city
- Location in Nepal
- Coordinates: 27.07°N 84.91°E
- Country: Nepal
- Development Region: Central
- Zone: Narayani Zone
- District: Bara District
- Province: Madhesh Province
- Established: 2016 A.D. (2073 B.S.)

Area
  - Total: 15.84 km^{2} (6.12 sq mi)

Population (2011)
  - Total: 22,787
  - Density: 1,439/km^{2} (3,726/sq mi)
  - Religions: Hindu Muslim Christian

Languages
  - Local: Bhojpuri, Maithili, Tharu, Nepali, Hindi
- Time zone: UTC+5:45 (NST)
- Postal Code: 44400
- Area code: 053
- Website: http://www.parwanipurmun.gov.np/
- Social Activist: Sochan Yadav

Parwanipur (Nepali: परवानीपुर ) is the smallest rural municipality in Bara District in Madhesh province of Nepal. It was formed in 2016 occupying current 5 sections (wards) from previous 5 former VDCs. It occupies an area of 15.48 km^{2} with a total population of 22,787. It lies approximately 12 km north to the Raxaul Custom of Indian state of Bihar. Parwanipur is known as an industrial corridor of Nepal. Tribhuvan Highway links Parwanipur city with Birgunj metropolitan and Nepal's capital, Kathmandu. Parwanipur is known as industrial manufacturing hub which encompass variety of company such as pharmaceuticals, textile, plastic, steel, vegetable ghee and food industry. This municipality is also known for its major political scrum which has originated many prominent leaders and political activist.
