= Babuain =

Babuain बाबुऐन
- Village Development Committee
- Location in Nepal
- Coordinates: 26.98°N 85.08°E
- Country: Nepal
- Zone: Narayani Zone
- District: Bara District

Population (2011)
  - Total: 3,459
- Time zone: UTC+5:45 (Nepal Time)

Babuain is a village and Village Development Committee in Bara District in the Narayani Zone of south-eastern Nepal. At the time of the 2011 Nepal census it had a population of 3,459 people living in 538 individual households. There were 1,778 males and 1,681 females at the time of census.
