= Kudawa =

Kudawa कुदवा
- Village Development Committee
- Location in Nepal
- Coordinates: 26.93°N 85.10°E
- Country: Nepal
- Zone: Narayani Zone
- District: Bara District

Population (1991)
  - Total: 2,352
- Time zone: UTC+5:45 (Nepal Time)

Kudawa is a village and Village Development Committee in Bara District in the Narayani Zone of south-eastern Nepal. At the time of the 1991 Nepal census it had a population of 2,352 persons living in 365 individual households.
