= Kabahijabdi =

Coordinates: 26.98°N 85.08°E

Kabahijabdi कबहीजब्दी
- Village Development Committee
- Interactive map of Kabahijabdi
- Country: Nepal
- Zone: Narayani Zone
- District: Bara District

Population (1991)
  - Total: 3,794
- Time zone: UTC+5:45 (Nepal Time)

Kabahijabdi is a town and Village Development Committee in Bara District in the Narayani Zone of south-eastern Nepal. At the time of the 1991 Nepal census it had a population of 3,794.
