= Motisar =

Motisar मोतिसर
- Village Development Committee
- Location in Nepal
- Coordinates: 27.03°N 84.97°E
- Country: Nepal
- Zone: Narayani Zone State = 2
- District: Bara District

Population (1991)
  - Total: 2,633
- Time zone: UTC+5:45 (Nepal Time)

Motisar is a village and Village Development Committee in Bara District in the Narayani Zone of south-eastern Nepal. At the time of the 1991 Nepal census it had a population of 2,633 persons living in 399 individual households. The village is situated between Kalaiya and Birgunj City.

There is no proper hospital facility in this village. Consequently, maternity and child death rates are high.

Motisar is a sub-metropolitan city which consists of 6 small villages. Most of the houses in the village are built with bricks and have red tiled roofs. There is a secondary level school in the southern part of this village. Late Gaya Raut is a first elected president of this village. There are many cast staying in this village. on the south side of this village one small lake is available. There are two temples in this village one is situated on west side (RAMJANKI MANDIR) and other one is situated on south side of this village (Shiva MANDIR).

Most of the people are educated. The majority of villages live on agriculture. All villagers are very friendly and helpful. The village population consists of educated, literate and illiterate people. In the past, the name must have been derived from the garden of Bramha ji which is called "motisar".
