= Sapahi =

Sapahi may refer to:

- Sapahi, Dhanusha, Nepal
- Sapahi, Bara, Nepal
