= Gadhahal =

Village in Bara District, Nepal

Gadhahal गढहल
- Village Development Committee
- Location in Nepal
- Coordinates: 27.01°N 85.11°E
- Country: Nepal
- Zone: Narayani Zone
- District: Bara District

Government
  - Information Technology Technician: Suraj Kumar Thakur

Population (1991)
  - Total: 2,425
- Time zone: UTC+5:45 (Nepal Time)

Gadhahal is a village and Village Development Committee in Bara District in the Narayani Zone of south-eastern Nepal. At the time of the 1991 Nepal census it had a population of 2,425 persons living in 409 individual households.
