= Basantpur, Bara =

Coordinates: 26°58′N 84°59′E

Basatpur बसतपुर
- Village Development Committee
- Interactive map of Basatpur
- Country: Nepal
- Zone: Narayani Zone
- District: Bara District

Population (1991)
  - Total: 4,435
- Time zone: UTC+5:45 (Nepal Time)
- Postal Code: 44411

Basatpur is a town and was Village Development Committee in Bara District in the Narayani Zone of south-eastern Nepal. According to new geographical updates in Nepal, Basatpur now falls under Kalaiya Sub-Metropolitan City and has been defined as Kalaiya-20 where 20 is a ward number in Kalaiya. It is now Basatpur in Bara District, Kalaiya Sub-Metropolitan City, Province Number 2, NEPAL. It's no longer Village Development Committee. The capital of the district is Kalaiya which is around 10 km north of Basatpur, Matiarwa lies west of Basatpur which is another town in the Kalaiya Sub-Metropolitan City. Adapur lies to the south of Basatpur which is a small town next to Basatpur in India. Basatpur is one of the biggest town and populated town in Kalaiya, Bara. To the south of Basatpur, it has open border of India which is just 1-2 km far from the town. It has plain areas and very fertile lands to grow crops. It is a popular town in the neighboring areas which is famous for its markets, ponds, temples, and culture. The majority of person living in the town are Hinduism and then Muslims. At the time of the 1991 Nepal census it had a population of 4,435 persons residing in 740 individual households.
