= Patharhati =

Coordinates: 26.98°N 85.05°E

Patharhati पथरहाटी
- Village Development Committee
- Interactive map of Patharhati
- Country: Nepal
- Zone: Narayani Zone
- District: Bara District

Population (1991)
  - Total: 2,812
- Time zone: UTC+5:45 (Nepal Time)

Patharhati is a village and Village Development Committee in Bara District in the Narayani Zone of south-eastern Nepal. At the time of the 1991 Nepal census it had a population of 2,812 persons living in 452 individual households.
