= Naktuwa =

Naktuwa नकटुवा
- Village Development Committee
- Country: Nepal
- Zone: Narayani Zone
- District: Bara District

Population (1991)
  - Total: 2,219
- Time zone: UTC+5:45 (Nepal Time)

Naktuwa is a village and Village Development Committee in Bara District in the Narayani Zone of south-eastern Nepal. At the time of the 1991 Nepal census it had a population of 2,219 persons living in 345 individual households.
