= Bachhanpurwa =

Coordinates: 27°2′N 85°9′E

Bachhanpurwa बछाङपूर्व
- Village Development Committee
- Interactive map of Bachhanpurwa
- Country: Nepal
- Zone: Narayani Zone
- District: Bara District

Population (2011)
  - Total: 4,860
- Time zone: UTC+5:45 (Nepal Time)

Bachhanpurwa is a town and Village Development Committee in Bara District in the Narayani Zone of south-eastern Nepal. At the time of the 2011 Nepal census it had a population of 4,860 people living in 907 individual households. There were 2,284 males and 2,576 females at the time of census.
