= Amritganj =

Place in Nepal

Amritganj अमृतगञ्ज
- Municipality
- Interactive map of Amritganj
- Coordinates: 26°53′N 85°7′E
- Country: Nepal
- Zone: Narayani Zone
- District: Bara District

Population (2011)
  - Total: 9,133
- Time zone: UTC+5:45 (Nepal Time)
- Postal code: 44403

'Amritganj' (Nepali: अमृतगञ्ज) is a Municipality in Bara District in the Narayani Zone of south-eastern Nepal. At the time of the 2011 Nepal census it had a population of 9,133 persons living in 1466 individual households. There were 4,609 males and 4,524 females at the time of census.
