= Pheta Rural Municipality =

Pheta फेटा
- Rural Municipality
- Location in Nepal
- Coordinates: 27.00°N 84.94°E
- Country: Nepal
- Development Region: Central
- Zone: Narayani Zone
- District: Bara District
- Province: Province No. 2
- Established: 2016 A.D. (2073 B.S.)

Government
  - Type: Chairperson
  - Mayor: Rushtam Ansari (BSP)
  - Deputy Chairperson: Nilam Sah (BSP)

Area
  - Total: 23.65 km^{2} (9.13 sq mi)

Population (2011)
  - Total: 26,722
  - Density: 1,130/km^{2} (2,926/sq mi)
  - Religions: Hindu Muslim

Languages Bhojpuri = Local
- Time zone: UTC+5:45 (NST)
- Postal Code: 44400
- Area code: 053
- Website: http://www.phetamun.gov.np/

Map showing the local administrative divisions of Bara District, Nepal, including Pheta Rural Municipality

Pheta (Nepali: फेटा) is a rural municipality in Bara District in Province No. 2 of Nepal. It was formed in 2016 occupying current 7 sections (wards) from previous 7 former VDCs. It occupies an area of 23.65 km^{2} with a total population of 26,722.
