= Inarwamal =

Inarwamal इनर्वामाल
- Village Development Committee
- Location in Nepal
- Coordinates: 26.95°N 85.15°E
- Country: Nepal
- Zone: Narayani Zone
- District: Bara District

Population (1991)
  - Total: 4,534
- Time zone: UTC+5:45 (Nepal Time)

Inarwamal is a town and Village Development Committee in Bara District in the Narayani Zone of south-eastern Nepal. At the time of the 1991 Nepal census it had a population of 4,534 persons living in 792 individual households.
