= Dharmanagar, Bara =

Coordinates: 26°59′N 84°59′E

Dharmanagar धर्मनगर
- Village Development Committee
- Interactive map of Dharmanagar
- Country: Nepal
- Zone: Narayani Zone
- District: Bara District

Population (2011)
  - Total: 5,357
- Time zone: UTC+5:45 (Nepal Time)

Dharmanagar is a village and Village Development Committee in Bara District in the Narayani Zone of south-eastern Nepal. At the time of the 2011 Nepal census it had a population of 5,357 persons living in 770 individual households. There were 2,786 males and 2,571 females at the time of census.
