= Bhatauda =

Bhatauda भतौडा
- Village Development Committee
- Location in Nepal
- Coordinates: 27.04°N 84.98°E
- Country: Nepal
- Zone: Narayani Zone
- District: Bara District

Population (1991)
  - Total: 3,593
- Time zone: UTC+5:45 (Nepal Time)

Bhatauda is a town and Village Development Committee in Bara District in the Narayani Zone of south-eastern Nepal. At the time of the 1991 Nepal census it had a population of 3,593 persons living in 553 individual households.
