= Amarpatti =

Amarpatti may refer to:

- Amarpatti, Bara, Nepal
- Amarpatti, Parsa, Nepal
