= Benauli =

Benauli बेनौली
- Ward
- Location in Nepal
- Coordinates: 26.90°N 85.07°E
- Country: Nepal
- Province: Madhesh Province
- District: Bara District

Population (2021)
  - Total: 3,924
- Time zone: UTC+5:45 (Nepal Time)

Benauli is a town and Village (Ward ) in Bara District in the Narayani Zone of south-eastern Nepal. At the time of the 2021 Nepal census it had a population of 3924 persons living in 563 individual households.

== Ward No. 7 ==
Ward Office: - Benauli

Includes Vdc: - Benauli (Ward 1 - 9)

Total Area: - 7.62 (Square K.M.)

Total Population: - 5110 (2011)

Ward Contact Person Name, Post, and Contact

Ward Contact Person Name, Post, and Contact
SN	Name	Post	Contact
1	Shree Dinanath Sahni	Ward Chairman	9855048788
2	Shree Mahaboob Alam Mansuri	Ward secretary	9819201300
3	Shree Shisankar Raut Jaishwal	Ward Member	-
4	Shree Sukdev Mukiya Bin	Ward Member	9814292954
5	Shree Mahapati Devi Dusadin	Ward backwards Female Member	9814175311
6	Shree Chunchun Kumari	Ward Female Member	9814223105
