= Terariya =

Coordinates: 27°4′N 85°7′E

Terariya तेरारिया
- Village Development Committee
- Interactive map of Terariya
- Country: Nepal
- Zone: Narayani Zone
- District: Bara District

Population (1991)
  - Total: 2,679
- Time zone: UTC+5:45 (Nepal Time)

Terariya is a village and Village Development Committee in Bara District in the Narayani Zone of south-eastern Nepal. At the time of the 1991 Nepal census it had a population of 2,679 persons living in 450 individual households.
