= Maheshpur, Bara =

Coordinates: 27°2′N 85°2′E

Maheshpur, Nepal महेशपुर
- Village Development Committee
- Interactive map of Maheshpur, Nepal
- Country: Nepal
- Zone: Narayani Zone
- District: Bara District

Population (1991)
  - Total: 3,621
- Time zone: UTC+5:45 (Nepal Time)

Maheshpur is a town and Village Development Committee in Bara District in the Narayani Zone of south-eastern Nepal. At the time of the 1991 Nepal census it had a population of 3,621 persons residing in 640 individual households.
