= Hardiya, Bara =

Coordinates: 26°55′N 85°4′E

Hardiya हर्दिया
- Village Development Committee
- Interactive map of Hardiya
- Country: Nepal
- Zone: Narayani Zone
- District: Bara District

Population (2011)
  - Total: 5,158
- Time zone: UTC+5:45 (Nepal Time)

Hardiya is a village and Village Development Committee in Bara District in the Narayani Zone of south-eastern Nepal. At the time of the 2011 Nepal census it had a population of 5,158 persons living in 739 individual households. There were 2,732 males and 2,426 females at the time of census.
