= Inarwasira =

Inarwasira इनर्वासिरा
- Ward 19- Jeetpursimara sub metropolitican cit
- Location in Nepal
- Coordinates: 27.09°N 85.00°E
- Country: Nepal
- Zone: Narayani Zone
- District: Bara District

Population (1991)
  - Total: 8,588
- Time zone: UTC+5:45 (Nepal Time)

Inarwasira is a ward of Jeetpursimara sub-metropolitan city in Bara District in the Narayani Zone of south-eastern Nepal. At the time of the 1991 Nepal census, it had a population of 8,588. But now from 2017 election, its population has increased. Now, the population is 15,000 in this ward. It is an important ward of the Jeetpursimara metropolitan city. In this ward some banks like Sana Kishan bank, some saving banks and Exchanges are also have been established. It has a higher secondary school. It has a global road to reach Kalaiya & Jeetpur. The Road is named as Hulaki Marg and is under construction process. The most important thing in this village is a market, called "Inarwa Bazar" and is famous around the area. As a whole, the village is growing day by day.
