= Chhata Pipra =

Village Development Committee in Narayani Zone, Nepal

Coordinates: 27°5′N 84°57′E

Chhata Pipra छाता पिपरा
- Village Development Committee
- Interactive map of Chhata Pipra
- Country: Nepal
- Zone: Narayani Zone
- District: Bara District

Population (2011)
  - Total: 7,175
- Time zone: UTC+5:45 (Nepal Time)

Chhata Pipra is a town in Gadhimai Municipality in Bara District in the Narayani Zone of south-eastern Nepal. The formerly Village Development Committee was merged to form new municipality on 18 May 2014. At the time of the 2011 Nepal census it had a population of 7,175 persons living in 1,065 individual households. There were 3,674 males and 3,501 females at the time of census.
