= Adarsha Kotwal Rural Municipality =

Place in Nepal

Aadarsh Kotwal आदर्श कोतवाल
- Rural Municipality
- Location in Nepal
- Coordinates: 26.94°N 85.13°E
- Country: Nepal
- Development Region: Central
- Zone: Narayani Zone
- District: Bara District
- Province: Province No. 2
- Established: 2016 A.D. (2073 B.S.)

Government
  - Mayor: Mustufa Ansari (FSFN)
  - Deputy Mayor: Poonam Devi Shah (FSFN)

Area
  - Total: 36.25 km^{2} (14.00 sq mi)

Population (2011)
  - Total: 27,552
  - Density: 760.1/km^{2} (1,969/sq mi)
  - Religions: Hindu

Languages
  - Local: Bhojpuri, Maithili, Tharu, Nepali
- Time zone: UTC+5:45 (NST)
- Postal Code: 44400
- Area code: 053
- Website: http://www.aadarshakotwalmun.gov.np/

Adarsha Kotwal (Nepali: आदर्श कोतवाल) is a rural municipality in Bara District in Province No. 2 of Nepal. It was formed in 2016 occupying current 8 sections (wards) from previous 8 former VDCs. It occupies an area of 36.25 km^{2} with a total population of 27,552.
