= Bhaudaha, Bara =

Coordinates: 27.0833°N 85.0500°E

Bhodaha भोडहा
- Village Development Committee
- Interactive map of Bhodaha
- Country: Nepal
- Zone: Narayani Zone
- District: Bara District

Population (1991)
  - Total: 6,491
- Time zone: UTC+5:45 (Nepal Time)

Bhodaha is a small town in the Bara District in the Narayani Zone of south-eastern Nepal. It has a population of 6,491 people in 1,071 households as of the 1991 Nepal census.
