= Phattepur =

Fattepur फत्तेपुर
- Interactive map of Fattepur
- Coordinates: 27°7′N 85°0′E
- Country: Nepal
- Region: Central (CDR)
- Zone: Narayani Zone
- District: Bara District
- Elevation: 115 m (377 ft)

Population (2011)
  - Total: 8,890
- Time zone: UTC+5:45 (Nepal Time)

Fattepur is a town in Jitpur Simara Sub Metropolitan City in Bara District in the Narayani Zone of south-eastern Nepal. The formerly Village Development Committee was merged to form new municipality on 18 May 2014. Fattepur falls under ward council number 12 of Jitpur Simara Sub Metropolitan City. At the time of the 2011 Nepal census it had a population of 8,890 persons living in 1,504 individual households. Its elevation is 377 ft. There were 4,521 males and 4,369 females in the 2011 census.

== See also ==
- Chandra Nahar Canal
