= Kathmandu–Terai Expressway =

Under construction expressway in Nepal

Kathmandu–Terai/Madhesh Expressway काठमाडौं-तराई/मधेश द्रुतमार्ग
- राष्ट्रिय राजमार्ग ३३
- National Highway 33
- Kathmandu–Terai / Madhesh Expressway in red

Route information
- Maintained by MoPIT (Department of Roads)
- Length: 70.977 km (44.103 mi)

Major junctions
- From: Kathmandu, Nepal
- To: Nijgadh, Nepal

Location
- Country: Nepal
- Provinces: Bagmati, Madhesh

Highway system
- Roads in Nepal
← NH32	→ NH34

Kathmandu–Terai/Madhesh Expressway or NH33 (previously: H20) (Nepali: काठमाडौँ तराई द्रुतमार्ग), also known as Fast Track, is an under construction road connecting Kathmandu and Nijgadh in southern Terai region of Nepal. The road is 70.977 kilometres (44.103 mi) long, of which, 48.037 kilometres (29.849 mi) is normal roads, 12.885 kilometres (8.006 mi) is bridges and 10.055 kilometres (6.248 mi) is tunnels.

== Description ==
The expressway is 70.977 kilometres (44.103 mi) long. It has 89 bridges and 7 tunnels.

== Construction ==
The expressway's initial design was prepared by the Nepal Engineering Consultancy in 2002. The Nepali Army acquired right of way for the project from 2010 to 2012.

The Cabinet transferred management of the expressway from the then Ministry of Physical Infrastructure and Transport to the Nepali Army in August 2017. The army set an original completion date of September 2021. In 2020, the Nepal Army had selected six international firms to provide consultation service for the project, however the process was stopped after a probe found that the selection criteria were leaked. The completion date was later extended to December 2024 and then again to April 2027.

Flooding in 2024 in Makwanpur damaged sections of the project.

In September 2026, the deadline was extended for the third time to April 2030. As of September 2026, the project is 50.02% completed. The estimated cost of the project is रू 221.93 billion.

The consulting service for the construction is provided by Yooshin Engineering, Korea Expressway Corporation and Pyunghwa Engineering Corporation, Korean firm. The most complicated section, including the tunnels and several bridges will be constructed by Chinese companies China State Construction Engineering, Poly Changda Engineering and others.

== See also ==
- National Highway System
- Nijgadh International Airport, which will be connected to Kathmandu by the expressway
