= Prasauni Rural Municipality =

Prasauni Gaupalika प्रसौनी गाउपालिका Prasauni Bazaar
- Rural Municipality
- Prasauni Rural Municipality
- Nickname: prasauni
- Location in Nepal
- Coordinates: 27.03°N 84.92°E
- Country: Nepal
- Development Region: Central
- Zone: Narayani Zone
- District: Bara District
- Province: Province No. 2
- Established: 2016 A.D. (2073 B.S.)

Area
  - Total: 20.24 km^{2} (7.81 sq mi)

Population (2011)
  - Total: 25,478
  - Density: 1,259/km^{2} (3,260/sq mi)
  - Religions: Hindu Muslim Christian

Languages
  - Local: Bhojpuri, Maithili, Tharu, Nepali
- Time zone: UTC+5:45 (NST)
- Postal Code: 44400
- Area code: 053
- Website: http://www.prasaunimun.gov.np/

Prasauni (Nepali: प्रसौनी) is a rural municipality in Bara District in Province No. 2 of Nepal. It was formed in 2016 occupying current 7 sections (wards) from previous 7 former VDCs. It occupies an area of 20.24 km^{2} with a total population of 25,478.
