= Bhagwanpur, Nepal =

Baghwan बघवन
- Village Development Committee
- Location in Nepal
- Coordinates: 27.00°N 85.02°E
- Country: Nepal
- Zone: Narayani Zone
- District: Bara District

Population (1991)
  - Total: 2,313
- Time zone: UTC+5:45 (Nepal Time)

Baghwan is a village and Village Development Committee in Bara District in the Narayani Zone of south-eastern Nepal. At the time of the 1991 Nepal census it had a population of 2,313 persons living in 418 individual households.
