= Kakadi =

Coordinates: 27°5′N 85°7′E

Kakadi काकडी
- Village Development Committee
- Interactive map of Kakadi
- Country: Nepal
- Zone: Narayani Zone
- District: Bara District

Population (1991)
  - Total: 2,808
- Time zone: UTC+5:45 (Nepal Time)

Kakadi is a town and Village Development Committee in Bara District in the Narayani Zone of south-eastern Nepal. At the time of the 1991 Nepal census it had a population of 2,808 persons living in 482 individual households.
