= Telkuwa =

Telkuwa तेल्कुवा
- Village Development Committee
- Location in Nepal
- Coordinates: 26.96°N 85.05°E
- Country: Nepal
- Zone: Narayani Zone
- District: Bara District

Population (1991)
  - Total: 2,531
- Time zone: UTC+5:45 (Nepal Time)

Telkuwa is a village and Village Development Committee in Bara District in the Narayani Zone of south-eastern Nepal. At the time of the 1991 Nepal census it had a population of 2,531 persons living in 402 individual households.
