= Rampur Tokani =

Rampur Tokani रामपुर टोकनी
- Village Development Committee
- Location in Nepal
- Coordinates: 27.06°N 84.93°E
- Country: Nepal
- Zone: Narayani Zone
- District: Bara District

Population (1991)
  - Total: 3,551
- Time zone: UTC+5:45 (Nepal Time)

Rampur Tokani is a town and Village Development Committee in Bara District in the Narayani Zone of south-eastern Nepal. At the time of the 1991 Nepal census it had a population of 3,551 persons living in 611 individual households.
