= Khajani =

Village in Bara District, Nepal

Coordinates: 26°53′N 85°07′E

Khajani is a small village in Simraungadh municipality, Bara District, Nepal. It lies in Madesh.
