= Baragadhi Rural Municipality =

Baragadhi बारागढी
- Rural Municipality
- Location in Nepal
- Coordinates: 27.00°N 85.12°E
- Country: Nepal
- Development Region: Central
- Zone: Narayani Zone
- District: Bara District
- Province: Province No. 2
- Established: 2016 A.D. (2073 B.S.)

Area
  - Total: 39.29 km^{2} (15.17 sq mi)

Population (2011)
  - Total: 27,191
  - Density: 692.1/km^{2} (1,792/sq mi)
  - Religions: Hindu Muslim Christian

Languages
  - Local: Maithili, Tharu, Nepali
- Time zone: UTC+5:45 (NST)
- Postal Code: 44400
- Area code: 053
- Website: http://www.baragadhimun.gov.np/

Baragadhi (Nepali: बारागढी ) is a rural municipality in Bara District in Province No. 2 of Nepal. It was formed in 2016 occupying current 6 sections (wards) from previous 6 former VDCs. It occupies an area of 39.29 km^{2} with a total population of 27.191.
