= Mahagadhimai Municipality =

Mahagadhimai महागढीमाई
- Municipality
- Location in Nepal
- Coordinates: 27.07°N 85.18°E
- Country: Nepal
- Development Region: Central
- District: Bara
- Province: Madhesh
- Established: 2016 A.D. (2073 B.S.)

Government
  - Mayor: Upen Prasad (NC)
  - Deputy Mayor: Tara Devi (NC)
- Time zone: UTC+5:45 (NST)
- Website: http://mahagadimaimun.gov.np

Mahagadhimai (Nepali: महागढीमाई) is a new municipality in Bara District, Nepal, named after the temple of goddess Gadhimai. Composed of Bariyarpur, Ganjbhawanipur, Patrahati, Babuaayen, Malhani, Dahiyaar, Bagdampur, Kawahi Madhuri (Kawahijabdi), Telkuwa, Dharampur, Inarwa, and Benauli, it was announced by the Government of Nepal in 2014. The municipality has an area of 40.30 km^{2}. The office of the municipality is in Bariyarpur. The mayor is Upan Yadav of the Nepali Congress party, who was elected in September 2017 and re-elected in 2022.
