= Devtal Rural Municipality =

Devtal देवताल
- Rural Municipality
- Location in Nepal
- Coordinates: 26.94°N 85.01°E
- Country: Nepal
- Zone: Narayani Zone
- District: Bara
- Province: Province No. 2
- Established: 2016 A.D. (2073 B.S.)

Government
  - Mayor: Uday Prasad Yadav
  - Deputy Mayor: Sitapati Devi Yadav

Area
  - Total: 23.31 km^{2} (9.00 sq mi)

Population (2011)
  - Total: 23,223
  - Density: 996.3/km^{2} (2,580/sq mi)
  - Religions: Hindu Muslim

Languages
  - Local: Maithili, Bhojpuri, Tharu, Nepali
- Time zone: UTC+5:45 (NST)
- Postal Code: 44400
- Area code: 053
- Website: http://www.devtalmun.gov.np/

Devtal (Nepali: देवताल ) is a rural municipality in Bara District in Province No. 2 of Nepal. It was formed in 2016 occupying current 7 sections (wards) from previous 7 former VDCs. It occupies an area of 23.31 km^{2} with a total population of 23,223.
