= Dumbarwana =

Dumarwana डुमरवाना
- Location in Nepal Dumarwana (Nepal)
- Coordinates: 27°8′N 85°3′E
- Country: Nepal
- Province: Madhesh Province
- District: Bara District

Population (2011)
  - Total: 21,470
- Time zone: UTC+5:45 (Nepal Time)

Dumarwana is a town in Jeetpursimara Sub-metropolitan City in Bara District in the Narayani Zone of south-eastern Nepal. The formerly Village Development Committee was merged to form new municipality since 18 May 2014. At the time of the 2011 Nepal census it had a population of 21,470 persons living in 4,416 individual households. There were 10,228 males and 11,242 females at the time of census.

Dumarwana has been the center of agriculture. It has lands of Birgunj Sugar Factory. Utilisation and protection of the lands has been facing challenges due to the illegal encroachment of the lands. Plan has been made to establish special economic zone to encourage economic development.

Dumarwana has its own college, high schools and cooperatives.

== Notable people ==
- Najir Husen, Nepalese actor
