= Amarpatti, Bara =

Place in Nepal

Coordinates: 26°57′N 85°6′E

Amarpatti अमरपट्टी
- Ward
- Interactive map of Amarpatti
- Country: Nepal
- Province: Madhesh Province
- District: Bara District

Population (2011)
  - Total: 3,738
- Time zone: UTC+5:45 (Nepal Time)

Amarpatti is a village(Ward) in Bara District in the Madhesh Province of south-eastern Nepal. At the time of the 2021 Nepal census it had a population of 3,822 people living in 596 individual households. There were 1,944 males and 1,878 females at the time of census.

== Ward No. 8 ==
Ward Office: - Amarpati

Includes Vdc: - Amarpati (Ward 1 - 9)

Total Area: - 6.48 (Square K.M.)

Total Population: - 3738 (2011)

Ward Contact Person Name, Post, and Contact

Ward Contact Person Name, Post, and Contact
SN	Name	Post	Contact
1	Shree Sarwajeet Yadav	Ward Chairman	9855048789
2	Shree Ganaga Prasad Sah	Ward secretary	9845095949
3	Shree Jokhan Prasad Chaudhari	Ward Member	9807122922
4	Shree Bhola Chaudhari	Ward Member	9814283593
5	Shree Asturni Devi Hajam	Ward backwards Female Member	9809123799
6	Shree Gaytri Devi	Ward Female Member	9818476236
