= Bhaudaha, Morang =

Bhaudaha भौडाहा
- Village development committee
- Location in Nepal
- Coordinates: 26.49°N 87.34°E
- Country: Nepal
- Zone: Koshi Zone
- District: Morang District

Population (1991)
  - Total: 4,743
- Time zone: UTC+5:45 (Nepal Time)
- Postal code: 56612
- Area code: 021

Bhaudaha is a village development committee in Morang District in the Kosi Zone of south-eastern Nepal. At the time of the 1991 Nepal census it had a population of 4743 people living in 876 individual households.

It is situated to the northeast of Biratnagar town. There are no major trade centres in the VDC, as it lies off the main road, although it is close to the major market centres of Jhorahat to the west and Naya Bazaar to the south. It is mostly an agricultural area, although there are some minor industries such as brick kilns, and a large number of residents work in the industrial belt between Biratnagar and Rangeli. Handicrafts which originate in the area include traditional woven mats, which are available at local markets or in Biratnagar bazaar.

The Judi khola cuts through the VDC from north to south, providing a source of irrigation, although the VDC also lies towards the tail end of the Sunsari-Morang canal network.

Bhaudaha is home predominantly to the Batar community, although there is a sizeable Rajbanshi community in Sitpur to the north and a large Jhagar community in the south. As across Morang district, there are a number of other Nepali and Maithili speaking castes present in minority numbers.
