= Haraiya =

Ramnagar रामनगर
- Village Development Committee
- Location in Nepal
- Coordinates: 27°5′37.529″N 85°4′48.1″E
- Country: Nepal
- Provinces of Nepal: Madhesh
- Zone: Narayani Zone
- District: Bara District

Population (2011)
  - Total: 9,710
- Time zone: UTC+5:45 (Nepal Time)
- Postal code: 44400

Haraiya is a town and Village Development Committee in Bara District in the Narayani Zone of south-eastern Nepal. At the time of the 2011 Nepal census it had a population of 9,710 persons living in 1,714 individual households. There were 4,788 males and 4,922 females at the time of census.
