= Sapahi, Bara =

Sapahi, Narayani सपही शान्तिनगर टोल
- Village Development Committee
- Nickname: तामागढी
- Location in Nepal
- Coordinates: 27.13°N 85.18°E
- Country: Nepal
- Zone: Narayani Zone
- District: Bara District

Population (1991)
  - Total: 7,209
- Time zone: UTC+5:45 (Nepal Time)

Sapahi is a town and Village Development Committee in Bara District in the Narayani Zone of south-eastern Nepal. At the time of the 1991 Nepal census it had a population of 7,209 persons living in 1275 individual households.
