= Kolhabi =

Kolhabi कोल्हवी
- Municipality
- Location in Nepal
- Coordinates: 27.07°N 85.18°E
- Country: Nepal
- Province: Madhesh
- District: Bara
- Established: 2016 A.D. (2073 B.S.)

Area
  - Total: 157.4 km^{2} (60.8 sq mi)

Population (2011)
  - Total: 43,036
  - Density: 273.4/km^{2} (708.1/sq mi)
  - Religions: Hindu Muslim Christian

Languages
  - Local: Tharu
- Time zone: UTC+5:45 (NST)
- Postal Code: 44400
- Area code: 053
- Website: www.kolhabimun.gov.np

Kolhabi (Nepali: कोल्हवि ) is a municipality in Bara District in the Madhesh Province of Nepal. It was formed in 2016, occupying current 11 sections (wards) from previous 11 former VDCs. It occupies an area of 157.4 km^{2} with a total population of 43,036.

== Demographics ==
At the time of the 2011 Nepal census, Kolhabi Municipality had a population of 44,082. Of these, 50.8% spoke Tharu, 24.0% Bhojpuri, 16.5% Nepali, 4.2% Maithili, 1.9% Tamang, 1.0% Urdu, 0.9% Newar and 0.5% Magar as their first language.

In terms of ethnicity/caste, 59.3% were Tharu, 8.1% Hill Brahmin, 5.1% Musahar, 4.6% Chhetri, 3.6% Chamar/Harijan/Ram, 2.4% Tamang, 2.2% Musalman, 1.7% Dusadh/Paswan/Pasi, 1.5% Teli, 1.4% Newar, 1.1% Magar, 1.0% Mallaha, 0.8% Bin, 0.8% Kami, 0.7% Kalwar, 0.6% Kanu, 0.5% Hajjam/Thakur, 0.5% Majhi, 0.5% Nuniya, 0.4% Kushwaha, 0.3% Terai Brahmin, 0.3% Damai/Dholi, 0.3% other Terai, 0.3% Thakuri, 0.2% Kathabaniyan, 0.2% Sanyasi/Dasnami, 0.2% Sonar, 0.2% Yadav, 0.1% other Dalit, 0.1% Dhanuk, 0.1% Dhobi, 0.1% Gharti/Bhujel, 0.1% Kurmi, 0.1% Mali, 0.1% Rai, 0.1% Thami and 0.1% others.

In terms of religion, 95.0% were Hindu, 2.5% Buddhist, 2.2% Muslim, 0.3% Christian and 0.1% others.

In terms of literacy, 57.7% could read and write, 2.2% could only read and 40.0% could neither read nor write.
