= Bara District =

District in Madhesh Province, Nepal

Bara District बारा जिल्ला
- District
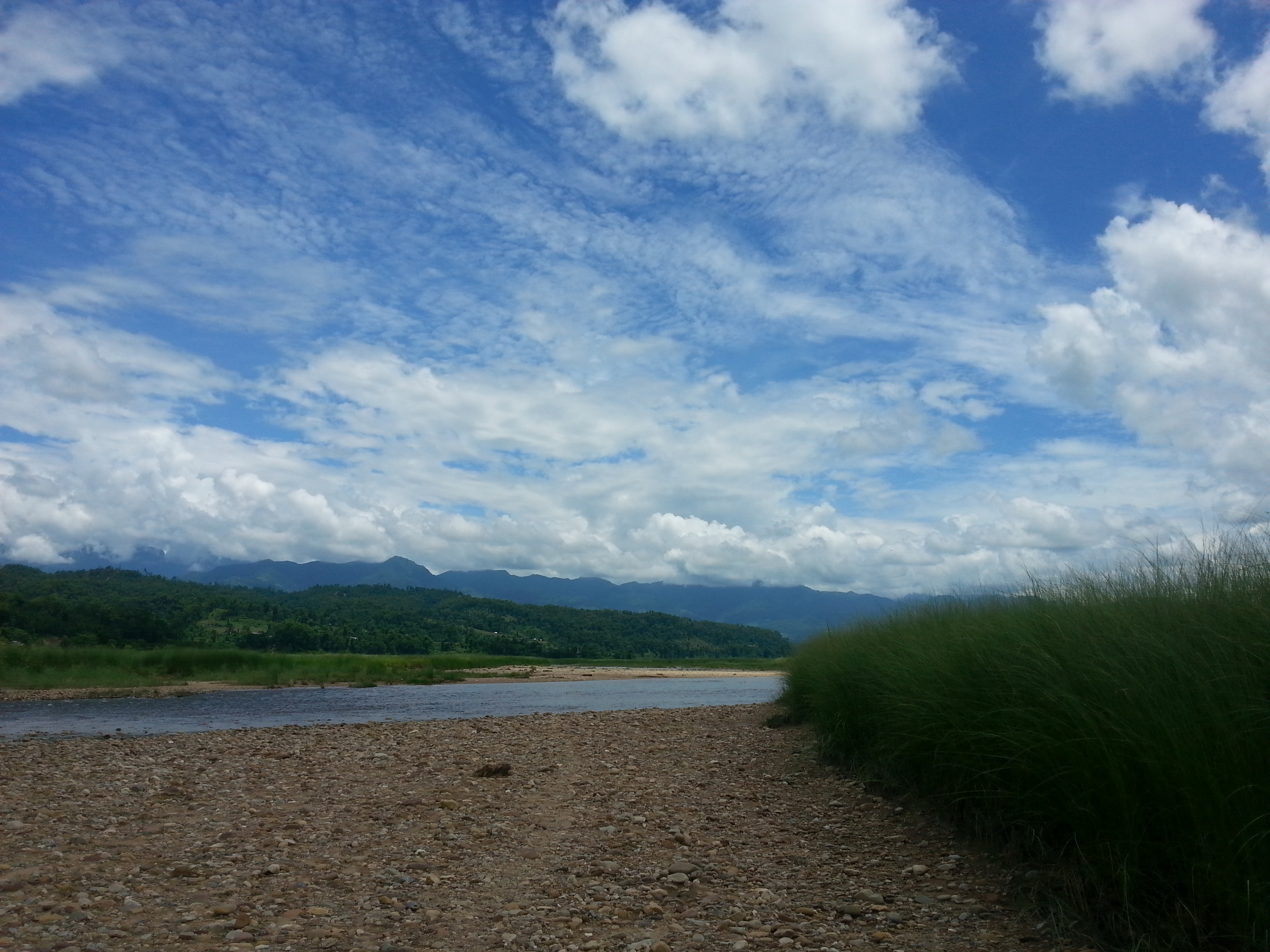
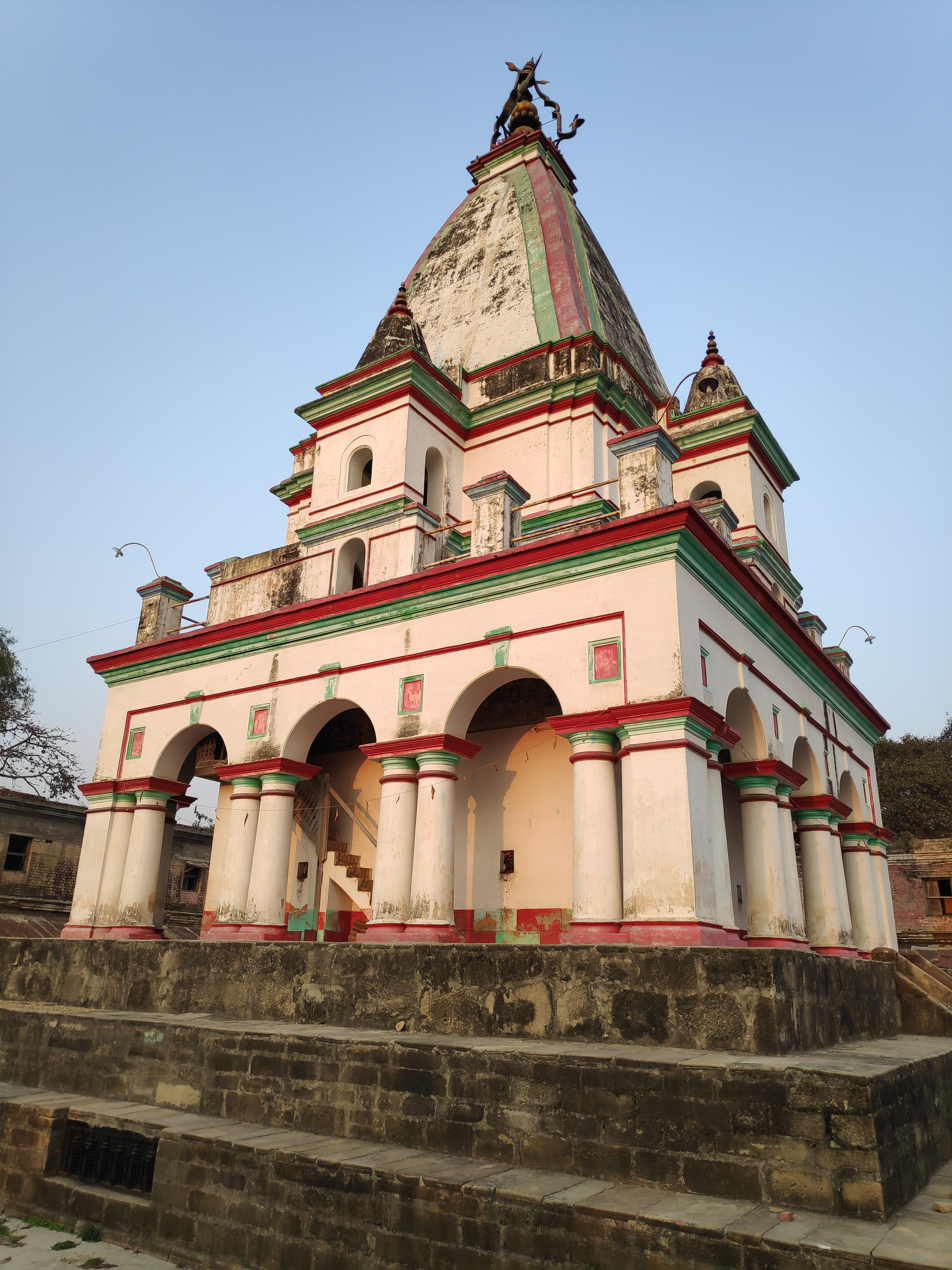
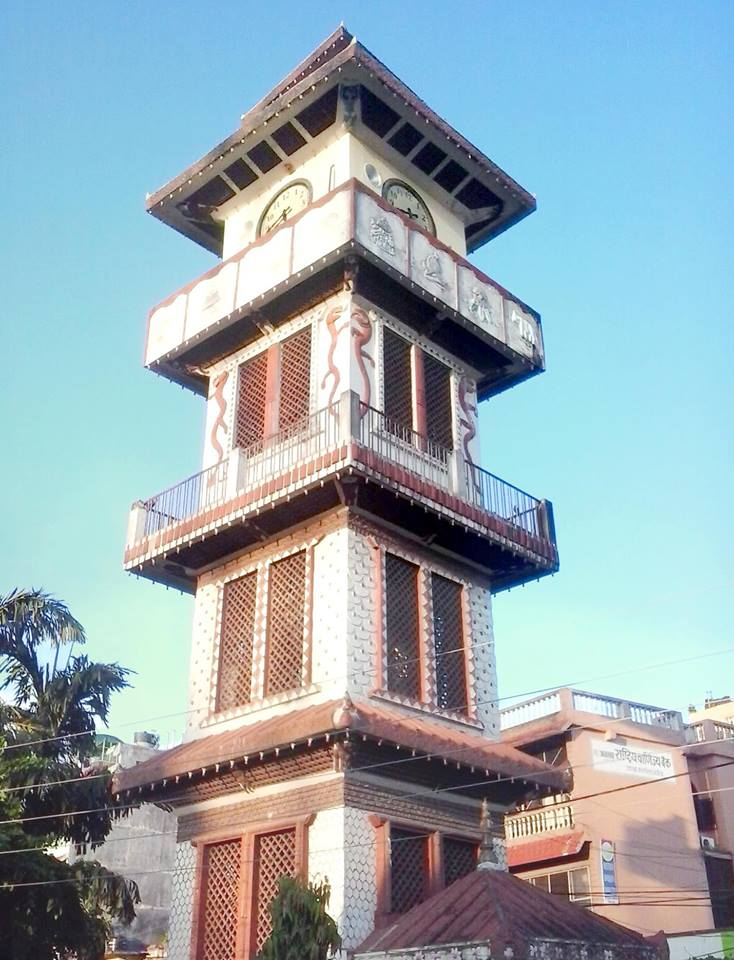
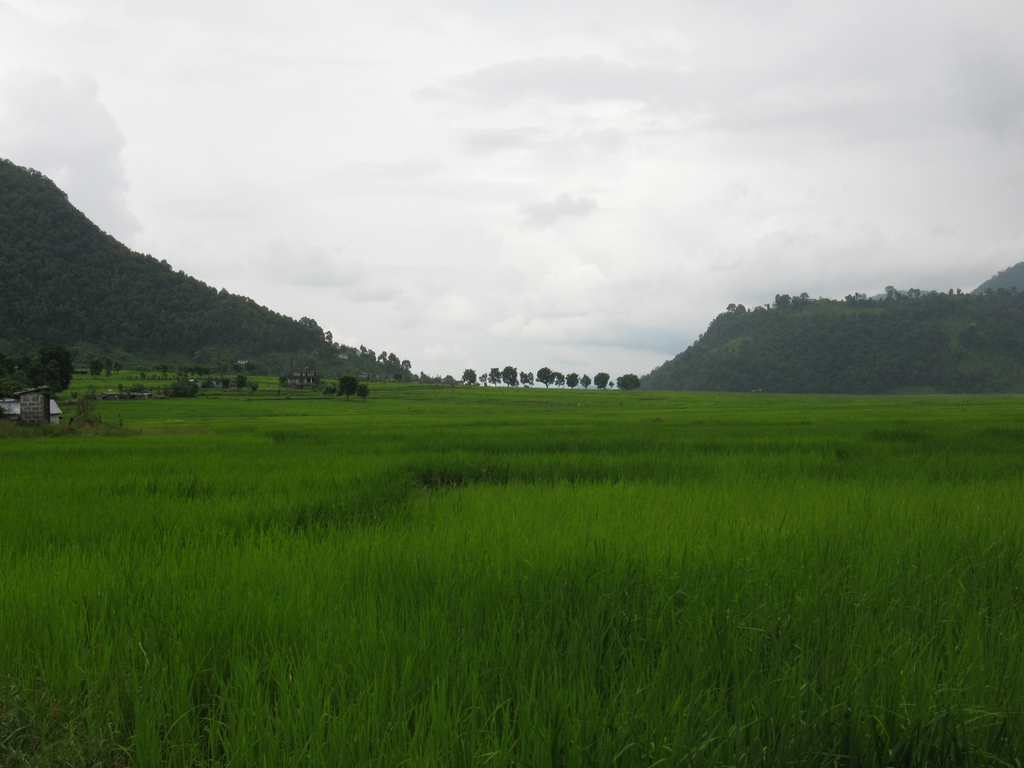
- Lal Bakaiya river, Kalaiya clock tower, a paddy field in Simara, remains of Simraungadh Fort (Clockwise from top)
- Nickname: अन्नको भण्डार
- Bara District (dark yellow) in Madhesh Province
- Country: Nepal
- Region: Bhojpuri region
- Province: Madhesh
- Admin Headquarter: Kalaiya

Government
  - Type: Coordination committee
  - Body: DCC, Bara

Area
  - Total: 1,190 km^{2} (460 sq mi)

Population (2021)
  - Total: 743,982
  - Density: 625/km^{2} (1,620/sq mi)
- Time zone: UTC+05:45 (NPT)
- Main language: Bhojpuri
- Website: ddcbara.gov.np

Bara District (Nepali: बारा जिल्ला) is one of the seventy-seven districts of Nepal, located in the western part of the Madhesh Province. The district is third richest district in Nepal after Kathmandu and Morang with 3.3% share of total GDP of Nepal and highest per capita income in Madhesh province. Kalaiya serves as the district's headquarter. Bakaiya, Jamuniya, Pasaha, Dudhaura and Bangari are the main rivers of Bara. Bhojpuri is the predominant local language spoken in the district.

== History ==
Simraungadh is major part of Bara district. It is a historical place in Nepal and famous for agricultural products. Here people grow wheat, maize, and various green vegetables (cauliflower, tomato, banana (raw), beetroot, bitter gourd, bottle gourd, brinjal, cabbage, carrot, cauliflower, chilli (green), chilli (dry red), coriander leaves, cucumber, potato and so on).

Bara district is famous for the Gadhimai Temple, particularly as every five years it celebrates the Gadhimai Mela. This festival has historically been celebrated every 5 years by sacrificing animals. In the future animal sacrifice will no longer occur, as temple authorities have decided to convert the festival into a "momentous celebration of life."

== Geography and climate ==
Climate Zone	Elevation Range	% of Area
Lower Tropical	below 300 meters (1,000 ft)	86.6%
Upper Tropical	300 to 1,000 meters 1,000 to 3,300 ft.	13.4%

The district is surrounded by Parsa district in the west, Rautahat district in the east, Makwanpur district of Bagmati province in the north and Indian state of Bihar in the south. It covers an area of 1,190 km^{2} (460 sq mi).

== Demographics ==
At the time of the 2021 Nepal census, Bara District had a population of 763,137. 10.17% of the population is under 5 years of age. It has a literacy rate of 64.54% and a sex ratio of 958 females per 1000 males. 507,224 (66.47%) lived in municipalities.

Ethnic groups/castes in Bara district (2021)
1. Muslim (14.4%)
2. Yadav (11.0%)
3. Tharu (10.2%)
4. Kanu (4.88%)
5. Chamar (4.60%)
6. Kushwaha (4.32%)
7. Kurmi (4.06%)
8. Teli (4.06%)
9. Tamang (3.92%)
10. Paswan (3.30%)
11. Dhanuk (2.90%)
12. Bahun (2.75%)
13. Kalwar (2.65%)
14. Chhetri (2.46%)
15. Mallaah (2.24%)
16. Other Madheshi non-Dalit (13.4%)
17. Other Madheshi Dalit (3.21%)
18. Other Hill Janjati (2.41%)
19. Others (3.23%)

Ethnicity/caste: Madheshi are the largest group, making up over 61% of the population. Muslims are the largest single community, making up over 14% of the population. Tharus are 10% of the population. There are small minorities of Khas and Hill Janjatis.

Religion: 80.9% were Hindu, 14.7% Muslim, 4.1% Buddhist, 0.3% Christian, 0.04% Kirati, 0.01% Prakriti and 0.3% others.

Literacy: 51.8% could read and write, 3.0% could only read and 45.1% could neither read nor write.

Historical population
census year	1981	1991	2001	2011	2021
Pop.	318,957	415,718	559,135	687,708	743,975
±% p.a.	—	+2.68%	+3.01%	+2.09%	+0.79%
Source: Citypopulation

According to the preliminary 2021 census, Bara district has a total population of 743,975. The population according to 2011 census was 687,708. Between 2011 and 2021, the population growth rate was 0.75%, the 32nd highest in the country. There are 112,329 households in the districts and 134,390 families in this district. The population density is 625 people per sq. kilometers and the average family size is 5.54.

The gender ratio of the district is 104.51 with 380,192 males and 363,783 females.

Languages of Bara district (2021)
1. Bhojpuri (73.9%)
2. Tharu (8.62%)
3. Nepali (8.57%)
4. Tamang (3.32%)
5. Urdu (2.13%)
6. Bajjika (1.74%)
7. Others (1.76%)

Bhojpuri is the largest language. Tharu is the second-largest language. Nepali is spoken by 9% of the population. Tamang, Urdu and Bajjika are spoken by a small minority.

== Administration ==
The district consists of two sub– metropolitan cities five urban municipalities and nine rural municipalities. These are as follows:

- Kalaiya Sub– Metropolitan City
- Jeetpur Simara Sub– Metropolitan City
- Kolhabi Municipality
- Nijgadh Municipality
- Mahagadhimai Municipality
- Simraungadh Municipality
- Pacharauta Municipality
- Pheta Rural Municipality
- Bishrampur Rural Municipality
- Prasauni Rural Municipality
- Adarsh Kotwal Rural Municipality
- Karaiyamai Rural Municipality
- Devtal Rural Municipality
- Parwanipur Rural Municipality
- Baragadhi Rural Municipality
- Suwarna Rural Municipality

=== Former municipalities and village development committees ===
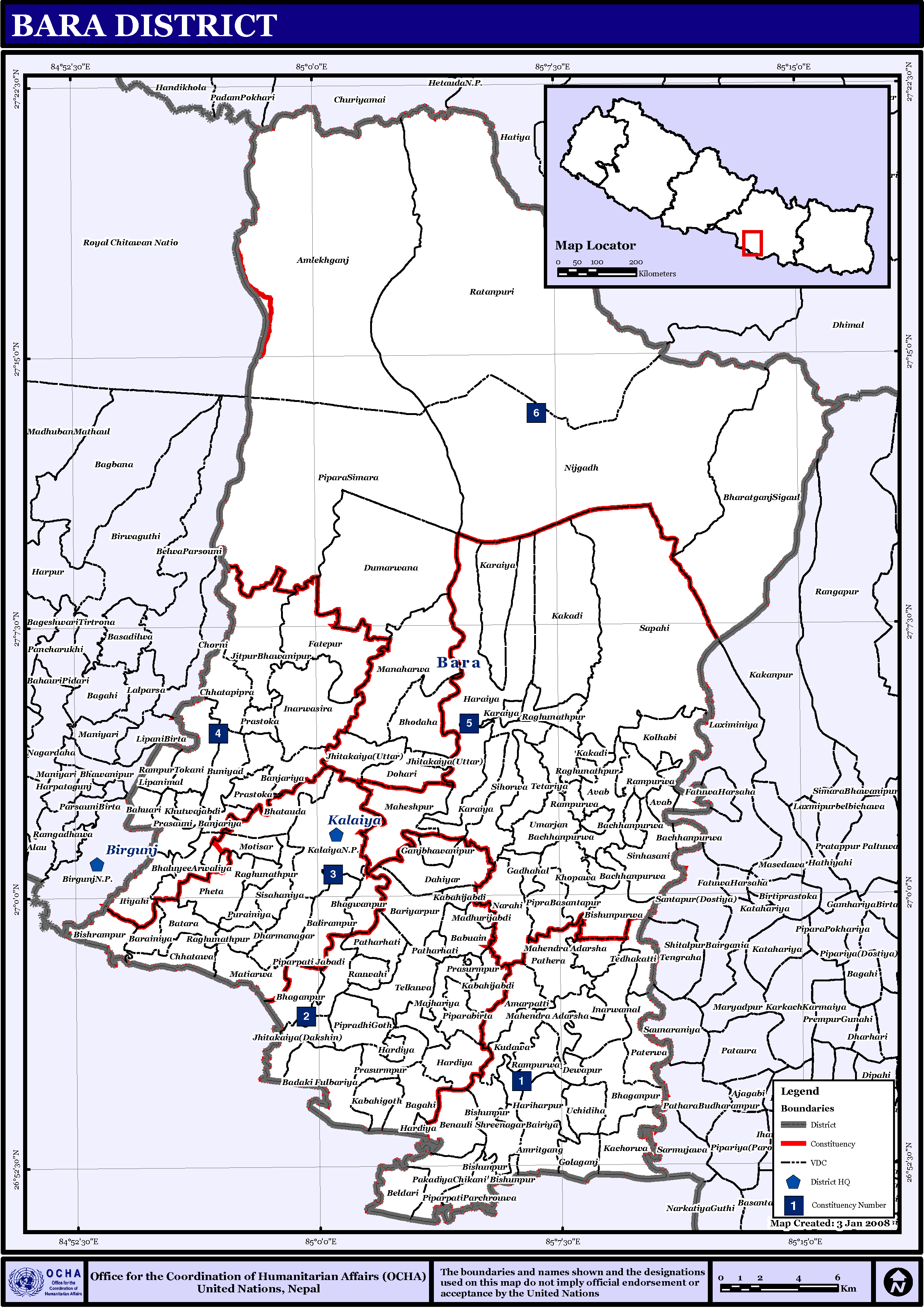
VDC/s and Municipalities (blue) in Bara District

Prior to the restructuring of the district, Bara consisted of the following municipalities and village development committees:

- Amarpatti
- Amlekhganj
- Amritganj
- Avab
- Gadhimai
- Babuain
- Bachhanpurwa
- Badaki Fulbariya
- Bagadi
- Bahuari
- Balirampur
- Baghwan
- Banjariya
- Barainiya
- Barawa
- Bariyarpur
- Basantpur
- Batara
- Beldari
- Benauli
- Bhagwanpur
- Bhaluwai Arwaliya
- Bhatauda
- Bhaudaha
- Bhuluhi Marwaliya
- Bishnupur
- Bishnupurwa
- Bishrampur
- Biswambharpur
- Brahmapuri
- Buniyad
- Chhata Pipra
- Chhatawa
- Dahiyar
- Dewapur
- Dharma Nagar
- Dohari
- Dumbarwana
- Gadhahal
- Ganj Bhawanipur
- Golaganj
- Haraiya
- Hardiya
- Hariharpur
- Inarwamal
- Inarwasira
- Itiyahi
- Jhitakaiya
- Jitpur Bhawanipur
- Kabahigoth
- Kabahijabdi
- Kachorwa
- Kakadi
- Kalaiya
- Karahiya
- Khopawa
- Khutwajabdi
- Kolhabi
- Kudawa
- Lakshmipur Kotwali
- Lipanimal
- Madhurijabdi
- Mahendra Adarsha
- Maheshpur
- Maini
- Majhariya
- Manaharwa
- Matiarwa
- Motisar
- Naktuwa
- Narahi
- Nijgadh
- Pakadiya Chikani
- Parsurampur
- Paterwa
- Patharhati
- Pathlaiya
- Pathara
- Phattepur
- Pheta
- Piparpati Ek
- Piparpati Dui
- Piparpati Jabdi
- Piparpati Pacharauta
- Pipra Basantapur
- Piprabirta
- Pipradhi Goth
- Prasauni
- Prasona
- Prastoka
- Purainiya
- Raghunathpur
- Rampur Tokani
- Rampurwa
- Rauwahi
- Sapahi
- Srinagar Bairiya
- Sihorwa
- Sinhasani
- Sisahaniya
- Tedhakatti
- Telkuwa
- Terariya
- Uchidiha
- Umarjan

=== Villages ===
- Khajani

== Education ==
Symbiosis Institute of Management (SIM) is situated in district headquarter, Kalaiya which is committed for quality education in Commerce and Education.

== Notable people ==
- Jyotirishwar Thakur - Abahattha language poet from Simroungarh Kingdom
- Nanyadev - First King of Karnata Dynasty
- Harisinghdev - Last King of Karnata Dynasty
- Chandeshwar Thakur - Prime minister, commander & author of Sapta Ratnakara under King Harisinghdev.
- Umakanta Chaudhary – Deputy General Secretary of Nepali Congress and former Minister for Labour and Employment
- Mukunda Neupane – Senior leader of CPN (Unified Socialist) and Member of House of Representatives
- Farmullah Mansoor – Deputy General Secretary of Nepali Congress and former Minister for Labour and Employment
