= Kalaiya =

City in Nepal

Kalaiya कलैया
- Sub-metropolitan city
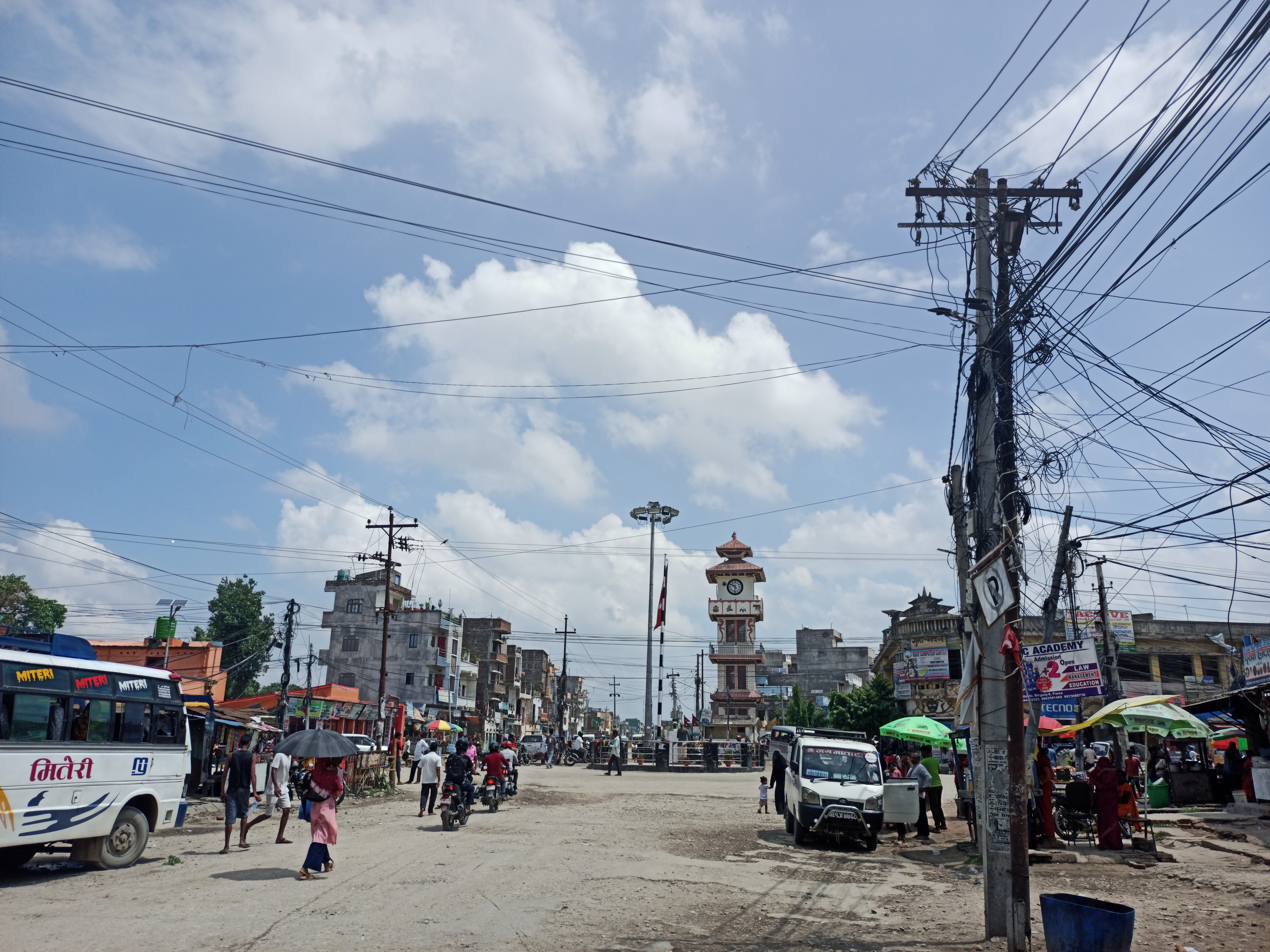
- Ghanta Ghar, Bharat Chowk, Kalaiya
- Interactive map of Kalaiya
- Location in Nepal Kalaiya (Nepal)
- Coordinates: 27°2′N 85°0′E
- Country: Nepal
- Province: Madhesh
- District: Bara

Government
  - Mayor: Binod Prasad Shah (CPN-UML)
  - Deputy mayor: Rausan Parwin (CPN-UML)

Area
  - Total: 108.94 km^{2} (42.06 sq mi)

Population (2021)
  - Total: 141,179
  - Density: 1,295.9/km^{2} (3,356.5/sq mi)
- Time zone: UTC+5:45 (NST)
- Postal code: 44400
- Area code: 053
- Website: kalaiyamun.gov.np

Kalaiya (Nepali: कलैया) is a sub-metropolitan Nepalese city and the district headquarters of the Bara District of Madhesh Province. It is known for its cultural heritage and its status as a gateway to the controversial Hindu Gadhimai festival. Kalaiya serves as an economic and administrative hub in the central Terai region.

== History ==
Kalaiya is historically significant as a center for the Bhojpuri-speaking community. Its identity is intertwined with the Gadhimai Temple, located in nearby Bariyarpur, which hosts the five-yearly Gadhimai festival, controversial for its large-scale animal sacrifices.

== Demographics ==
In the 2021 Nepal census, Kalaiya had a population of 141,179 people residing in 28,645 households.

== See also ==
- 2022 Kalaiya municipal election
