= Narayani Zone =

Coordinates: 27°25′N 85°00′E

Narayani नारायणी अञ्चल
- Zone
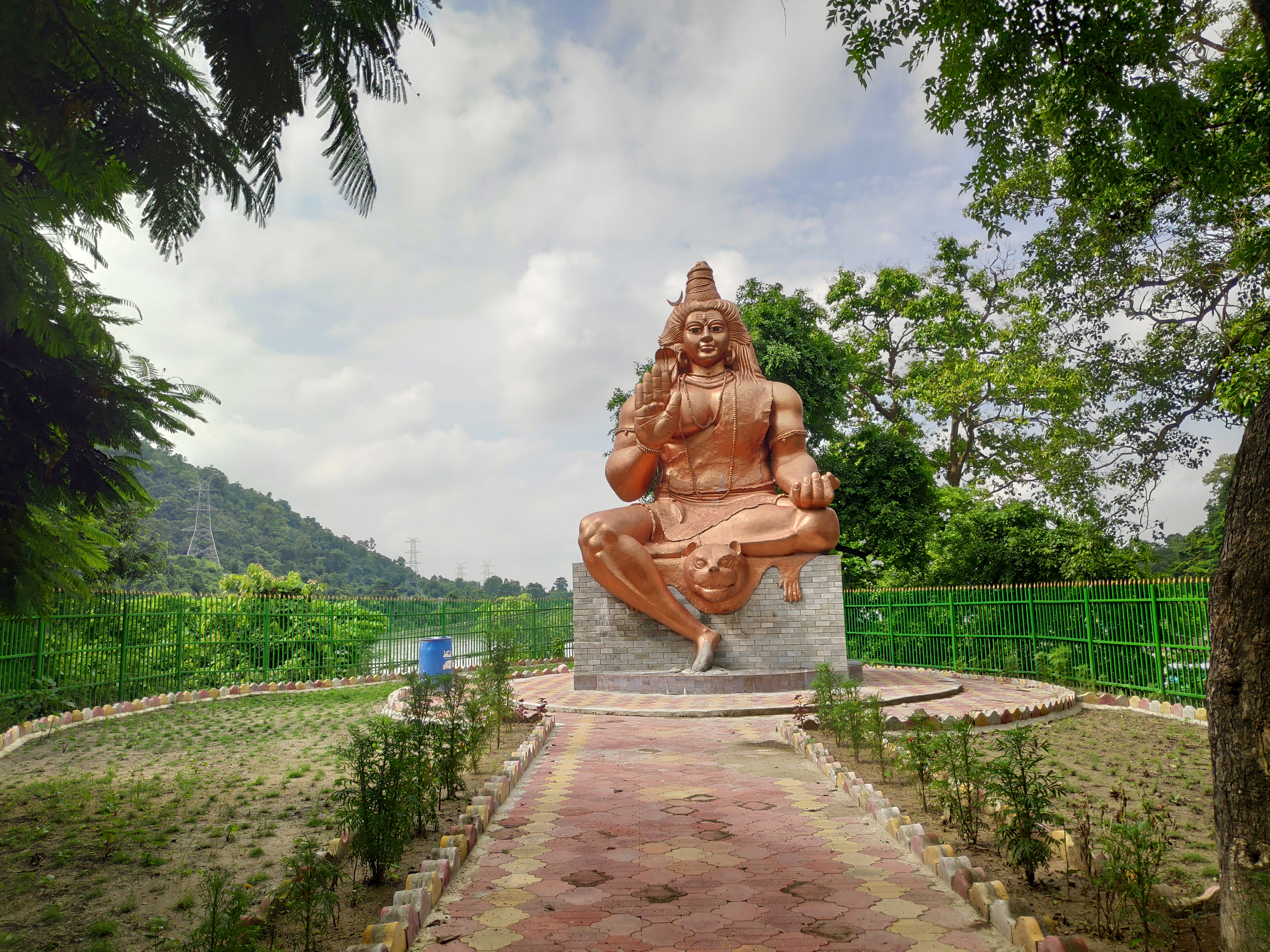
- Nunthardham

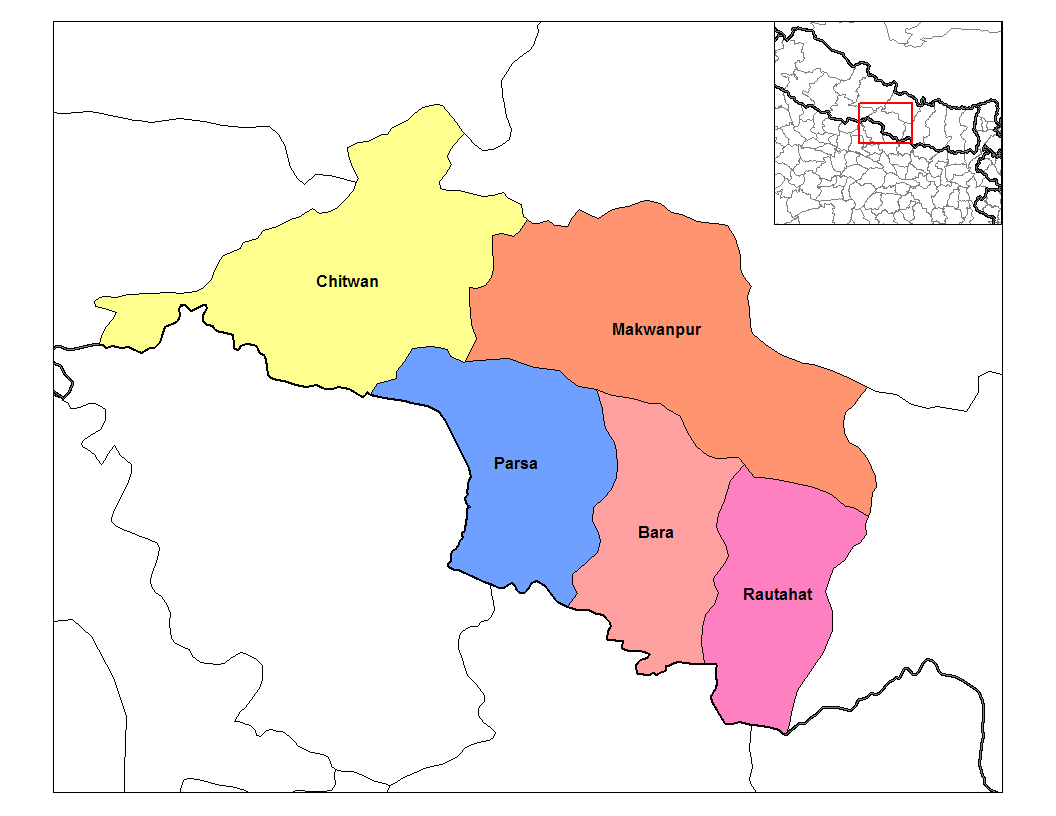
- Country: Nepal
- Time zone: UTC+5:45 (Nepal Time)

Narayani (Nepali: नारायणी अञ्चल) was one of the fourteen zones of Nepal until the restructuring of zones to Provinces, located in the central south of the country. The headquarter of Narayani zone was Hetauda. Narayani Zone is named after the Narayani River which is on the western border of the zone, separating it from the Gandaki and Lumbini zones.

== Administrative subdivisions ==
Narayani was divided into five districts; since 2015 the two northern districts have been redesignated as part of Bagmati Province, while the three southern districts have been redesignated as part of Madhesh Province.

District	Type	Headquarters	Since 2015 part of Province
Bara	Outer Terai	Kalaiya	Madhesh Province
Parsa	Outer Terai	Birgunj	Madhesh Province
Rautahat	Outer Terai	Gaur	Madhesh Province
Chitwan	Inner Terai	Bharatpur	Bagmati Province
Makwanpur	Inner Terai	Hetauda	Bagmati Province

== See also ==
- Development Regions of Nepal
- List of zones of Nepal
- List of districts of Nepal
