= List of cities in Nepal =

Metropolitan (Mahanagarpalika) and sub-metropolitan (Upamahanagarpalika) cities in Nepal
Metropolitan cities in Kathmandu Valley Region: Lalitpur and Kathmandu.
Red dot represents metropolitan cities.
Green dot represents sub-metropolitan cities.

Cities and towns in Nepal are incorporated under municipality. A municipality in Nepal is a sub-unit of a district. The Government of Nepal has set out a minimum criteria for municipalities. These criteria include a certain population, infrastructure and revenues. Presently, there are 293 municipalities in Nepal among which 6 are metropolis, 11 are sub-metropolis and 276 are municipal councils. Other than that there are 460 rural municipalities totaling 753 local level government within Nepal.

Kathmandu, the capital, is also the largest city. In terms of area, Pokhara is the largest metropolitan city covering a subtotal of 464.28 km^{2} while Lalitpur is the smallest, with an area of 36.12 km^{2}. Ghorahi is the largest sub-metropolitan city with an area of 522.21 km^{2} whereas Dhangadhi is the largest sub-metropolitan city by a population of 204,788. Budhanilkantha with a population of 179,688 is the largest municipality followed by Birendranagar with a population of 154,886. In terms of area, Sitganga is the largest municipality with an area of 610.43 square kilometres (235.69 mi^{2}).

== List of cities by classification ==
Along with other major criteria as mentioned in Local Governance Act 2017 of Nepal, the population size to be considered as the municipality: the minimum population in mountainous districts should be 10,000 while hilly districts, inner terai districts, terai districts, and Kathmandu valley should include forty thousand, fifty thousand, seventy thousand and one hundred thousand respectively. For sub-metropolitan, the population should be two hundred thousand, and it should be five hundred thousand for metropolitan.

The list includes the cities and not urban agglomerations.

The Ministry of Federal Affairs and General Administration has classified the local units into four grades based on infrastructure and social development.

Classification	Type	Quantity
Grade 'A'	Very remote	18
Grade 'B'	Remote	43
Grade 'C'	Fairly accessible	133
Grade 'D'	Accessible	99

The cities listed in bold are the capitals of their respective provinces of Nepal. The city in bold and italics is the country capital.

Metropolitan city Sub-metropolitan city Municipality

=== Metropolitan cities ===
Name	Nepali	District	Province	Population (2021)	Area (km^{2})	# of wards	Website
**Kathmandu**	काठमाडौँ	Kathmandu	Bagmati	862,400	49.45	32	
**Pokhara**	पोखरा	Kaski	Gandaki	513,504	464.24	33	
Bharatpur	भरतपुर	Chitwan	Bagmati	369,268	432.95	29	
Lalitpur	ललितपुर	Lalitpur	Bagmati	294,098	36.12	29	
Birgunj	वीरगञ्ज	Parsa	Madhesh	272,382	132.07	32	
**Biratnagar**	विराटनगर	Morang	Koshi	243,927	77.00	19	

=== Sub-metropolitan cities ===
Name	Nepali	District	Province	Population (2021)	Area	# of wards	Website
Ghorahi	घोराही	Dang	Lumbini	200,530	522.21	19	
**Dhangadhi**	धनगढी	Kailali	Sudurpashchim	198,792	261.75	19	
Itahari	इटहरी	Sunsari	Koshi	197,241	93.78	20	
**Janakpur**	जनकपुर	Dhanusha	Madhesh	194,556	91.97	25	
Butwal	बुटवल	Rupandehi	Lumbini	194,335	101.61	19	
**Hetauda**	हेटौडा	Makawanpur	Bagmati	193,576	261.59	19	
Tulsipur	तुलसीपुर	Dang	Lumbini	179,755	384.63	19	
Dharan	धरान	Sunsari	Koshi	166,531	192.32	20	
Nepalgunj	नेपालगञ्ज	Banke	Lumbini	164,444	85.94	23	
Kalaiya	कलैया	Bara	Madhesh	136,222	108.94	27	
Jitpursimara	जीतपुरसिमरा	Bara	Madhesh	127,307	312.18	24	

=== Municipality ===
Name	Nepali	District	Province	Population (2021)	Area	# of wards	Website
Budhanilkantha	बुढानिलकण्ठ	Kathmandu	Bagmati	177,557	34.8	13	
**Birendranagar**	वीरेन्द्रनगर	Surkhet	Karnali	154,886	245.06	16	
Tarakeshwar	तारकेश्वर	Kathmandu	Bagmati	151,479	54.95	11	
Tilottama	तिलोत्तमा	Rupandehi	Lumbini	149,479	126.19	17	
Gokarneshwar	गोकर्णेश्वर	Kathmandu	Bagmati	149,366	58.5	9	
Suryabinayak	सूर्यविनायक	Bhaktapur	Bagmati	140,085	42.45	10	
Chandragiri	चन्द्रागिरी	Kathmandu	Bagmati	136,860	43.9	15	
Tokha	टोखा	Kathmandu	Bagmati	133,755	17.11	11	
Mechinagar	मेचीनगर	Jhapa	Koshi	133,073	192.85	15	
Kageshwari-Manohara	कागेश्वरी मनोहरा	Kathmandu	Bagmati	130,433	27.38	9	
Mahalaxmi	महालक्ष्मी	Lalitpur	Bagmati	123,116	26.51	10	
Bhimdatta	भीमदत्त	Kanchanpur	Sudurpashchim	122,320	78.24	19	
Sundar Haraincha	सुन्दरहरैंचा	Morang	Koshi	121,305	110.16	12	
Madhyapur Thimi	मध्यपुर थिमी	Bhaktapur	Bagmati	119,756	11.47	9	
Birtamod	बिर्तामोड	Jhapa	Koshi	116,192	78.24	10	
Nagarjun	नागार्जुन	Kathmandu	Bagmati	115,437	29.85	10	
Damak	दमक	Jhapa	Koshi	107,227	70.86	10	
Triyuga	त्रियुगा	Udayapur	Koshi	102,725	547.43	16	
Lahan	लहान	Siraha	Madhesh	102,031	167.17	24	
Kohalpur	कोहलपुर	Banke	Lumbini	101,667	184.26	15	
Godawari	गोदावरी	Kailali	Sudurpashchim	98,746	305.63	12	
Godawari	गोदावरी	Lalitpur	Bagmati	97,633	96.11	14	
Banganga	बाणगंगा	Kapilvastu	Lumbini	96,714	233.68	11	
Siraha	सिरहा	Siraha	Madhesh	95,410	94.2	22	
Barahachhetra	बराहक्षेत्र	Sunsari	Koshi	91,087	222.09	11	
Lamki Chuha	लम्की चुहा	Kailali	Sudurpashchim	90,971	225	10	
Ratnanagar	रत्ननगर	Chitwan	Bagmati	89,905	68.68	16	
Tikapur	टिकापुर	Kailali	Sudurpashchim	89,835	121.92	9	
Kapilvastu	कपिलवस्तु	Kapilvastu	Lumbini	88,874	136.91	12	
Changunarayan	चाँगुनारायण	Bhaktapur	Bagmati	88,083	62.98	9	
Lumbini Sanskritik	लुम्बिनी सांस्कृतिक	Rupandehi	Lumbini	87,383	112.21	13	
Kawasoti	कावासोती	Nawalpur	Gandaki	86,821	108.34	17	
Ghodaghodi	घोडाघोडी	Kailali	Sudurpashchim	86,034	354.45	12	
Shivaraj	शिवराज	Kapilvastu	Lumbini	84,810	284.07	11	
Arjundhara	अर्जुनधारा	Jhapa	Koshi	84,018	109.86	11	
Chandrapur	चन्द्रपुर	Rautahat	Madhesh	81,807	249.96	10	
Belbari	बेलवारी	Morang	Koshi	81,771	132.79	11	
Kirtipur	किर्तिपुर	Kathmandu	Bagmati	81,578	14.76	10	
Barahathawa	बरहथवा	Sarlahi	Madhesh	81,120	107.05	18	
Gaindakot	गैडाकोट	Nawalpur	Gandaki	79,349	159.93	18	
Bhaktapur	भक्तपुर	Bhaktapur	Bagmati	79,136	6.89	10	
Vyas	व्यास	Tanahun	Gandaki	78,939	248	14	
Sainamaina	सैनामैना	Rupandehi	Lumbini	78,393	162.18	11	
Bardaghat	बर्दघाट	Nawalparasi West	Lumbini	76,703	162.05	16	[8]
Buddhabhumi	बुद्धभूमी	Kapilvastu	Lumbini	76,507	366.67	10	
Inaruwa	ईनरुवा	Sunsari	Koshi	74,914	77.92	10	
Gulariya	गुलरिया	Bardiya	Lumbini	74,505	118.21	12	
Siddharthanagar	सिद्धार्थनगर	Rupandehi	Lumbini	74,436	36.03	13	
Bardibas	बर्दिबास	Mahottari	Madhesh	74,361	315.57	14	
Shivasatakshi	शिवसताक्षि	Jhapa	Koshi	74,077	145.87	11	
Barbardiya	बारबर्दिया	Bardiya	Lumbini	72,533	226.09	11	
Gaushala	गौशाला	Mahottari	Madhesh	72,481	144.73	12	
Devdaha	देवदह	Rupandehi	Lumbini	72,457	136.95	12	
Pathari Shanischare	पथरी शनिश्चरे	Morang	Koshi	72,451	79.81	10	
Sunawal	सुनवल	Parasi	Lumbini	72,085	139.1	13	
Krishnapur	कृष्णपुर	Kanchanpur	Sudurpashchim	71,500	252.75	9	
Kamalamai	कमलामाई	Sindhuli	Bagmati	71,016	482.57	14	
Bhadrapur	भद्रपुर	Jhapa	Koshi	70,913	96.35	10	
Urlabari	उर्लावारी	Morang	Koshi	70,908	74.62	9	
Rajbiraj	राजविराज	Saptari	Madhesh	70,803	55.64	16	
Dudhauli	दुधौली	Sindhuli	Bagmati	70,207	390.39	14	
Krishnanagar	कृष्णनगर	Kapilvastu	Lumbini	70,111	96.66	12	
Ishwarpur	ईश्वरपूर	Sarlahi	Madhesh	68,377	163.83	15	
Banepa	बनेपा	Kavrepalanchok	Bagmati	67,690	54.59	14	
Khairhani	खैरहनी	Chitwan	Bagmati	67,385	85.55	13	
Rapti	राप्ती	Chitwan	Bagmati	66,617	212.31	13	
Lalbandi	लालबन्दी	Sarlahi	Madhesh	66,419	238.5	17	
Duhabi	दुहवी	Sunsari	Koshi	66,074	73.67	12	
Maharajganj	महाराजगंज	Kapilvastu	Lumbini	64,645	112.21	11	
Gauriganga	गौरीगंगा	Kailali	Sudurpashchim	64,558	244.44	11	
Ramgram	रामग्राम	Parasi	Lumbini	64,017	128.32	18	
Golbazar	गोलबजार	Siraha	Madhesh	63,885	111.94	13	
Jaleshwar	जलेश्वर	Mahottari	Madhesh	63,802	44.26	12	
Ramdhuni	रामधुनी	Sunsari	Koshi	63,452	91.69	9	
Bansgadhi	बासगढी	Bardiya	Lumbini	63,252	206.08	9	
Sabaila	सवैला	Dhanusha	Madhesh	62,282	64.47	13	
Punarbas	पुनर्वास	Kanchanpur	Sudurpashchim	61,748	103.71	11	
Ratuwamai	रतुवामाई	Morang	Koshi	61,139	142.15	10	
Madhyabindu	मध्यविन्दु	Nawalpur	Gandaki	61,091	233.35	15	
Garuda	गरुडा	Rautahat	Madhesh	60,857	44.46	9	
Rajapur	राजापुर	Bardiya	Lumbini	60,831	127.08	10	
Gauradaha	गौरादह	Jhapa	Koshi	60,451	149.86	9	
Katari	कटारी	Udayapur	Koshi	59,507	424.89	14	
Mirchaiya	मिर्चैया	Siraha	Madhesh	59,425	91.97	12	
Mahagadhimai	महागढीमाई	Bara	Madhesh	59,424	55.32	11	
Bidur	विदुर	Nuwakot	Bagmati	59,227	130.01	13	
Lamahi	लमही	Dang	Lumbini	59,050	326.66	9	
Kalyanpur	कल्याणपुर	Siraha	Madhesh	58,872	76.81	12	
Nilkantha	निलकण्ठ	Dhading	Bagmati	58,828	197.7	14	
Kanchanrup	कञ्चनरूप	Saptari	Madhesh	58,466	117.34	12	
Devchuli	देवचुली	Nawalpur	Gandaki	58,003	112.72	17	
Bedkot	वेदकोट	Kanchanpur	Sudurpashchim	57,680	159.92	10	
Rangeli	रंगेली	Morang	Koshi	57,494	111.78	9	
Baglung	बागलुङ	Baglung	Gandaki	56,102	98.01	14	
Sunawarshi	सुनवर्षी	Morang	Koshi	56,034	106.4	9	
Shuklagandaki	शुक्लागण्डकी	Tanahun	Gandaki	55,620	165	12	
Bhangaha	भँगाहा	Mahottari	Madhesh	55,354	77.21	9	
Simraungadh	सिम्रोनगढ	Bara	Madhesh	54,878	42.65	11	
Suryodaya	सूर्योदय	Ilam	Koshi	54,727	252.52	14	
Malangwa	मलङ्गवा	Sarlahi	Madhesh	54,550	30.44	12	
Godaita	गोडैता	Sarlahi	Madhesh	54,270	48.62	12	
Rajpur	राजपुर	Rautahat	Madhesh	54,083	31.41	9	
Gujara	गुजरा	Rautahat	Madhesh	54,033	150.33	9	
Shuklaphanta	शुक्लाफाँटा	Kanchanpur	Sudurpashchim	53,969	162.57	12	
Belauri	बेलौरी	Kanchanpur	Sudurpashchim	53,910	123.37	10	
Shahidnagar	शहिद नगर	Dhanusha	Madhesh	53,812	57.37	9	
Chaudandigadhi	चौदण्डीगढी	Udayapur	Koshi	53,631	283.78	10	
Bhajani	भजनी	Kailali	Sudurpashchim	53,494	176.25	9	
Dhangadimai	धनगढीमाई	Siraha	Madhesh	53,355	159.51	14	
Kankai	कन्काई	Jhapa	Koshi	53,148	80.98	9	
Hanumannagar Kankalini	हनुमाननगर कंकालिनी	Saptari	Madhesh	52,796	118.19	14	
Khadak	खडक	Saptari	Madhesh	52,778	93.77	11	
Gorkha	गोरखा	Gorkha	Gandaki	52,468	131.86	14	
Manara Shiswa	मनरा शिसवा	Mahottari	Madhesh	52,191	49.73	10	
Kalika	कालिका	Chitwan	Bagmati	52,164	149.08	11	
Dhanushadham	धनुषाधाम	Dhanusha	Madhesh	52,024	91.64	9	
Ishnath	ईशनाथ	Rautahat	Madhesh	51,855	35.18	9	
Paunauti	पनौती	Kavrepalanchok	Bagmati	51,504	118	12	
Kolhabi	कोल्हवी	Bara	Madhesh	51,182	157.4	11	
Chhireshwarnath	क्षिरेश्वरनाथ	Dhanusha	Madhesh	51,075	50.85	10	
Belaka	वेलका	Udayapur	Koshi	51,043	344.73	9	
Tansen	तानसेन	Palpa	Lumbini	50,792	109.8	14	
Madhuwan	मधुवन	Bardiya	Lumbini	50,739	129.73	9	
Waling	वालिङ	Syangja	Gandaki	50,488	128.4	14	
Ilam	इलाम	Ilam	Koshi	50,085	173.32	10	
Hariwan	हरिवन	Sarlahi	Madhesh	49,988	86.12	11	
Brindaban	बृन्दावन	Rautahat	Madhesh	49,742	95.4	9	
Balawa	बलवा	Mahottari	Madhesh	49,473	44.07	11	
Surunga	सुरुङ्गा	Saptari	Koshi	49,460	107.04	11	
Thakurbaba	ठाकुरबाबा	Bardiya	Lumbini	49,420	104.57	9	
Gadhimai	गढीमाई	Rautahat	Madhesh	49,135	49.44	9	
Mithila	मिथिला	Dhanusha	Madhesh	48,676	187.93	11	
Phidim	फिदिम	Pancthar	Koshi	48,495	192.5	14	
Gurbhakot	गुर्भाकोट	Surkhet	Karnali	48,216	228.62	14	
Bheriganga	भेरीगंगा	Surkhet	Karnali	48,203	256.2	13	
Balara	बलरा	Sarlahi	Madhesh	47,912	48.55	11	
Dakneshwari	दक्नेश्वारी	Saptari	Madhesh	47,739	69.11	10	
Bagmati	बागमती	Sarlahi	Madhesh	47,106	101.18	12	
Bodebarsain	बोदेबरसाईन	Saptari	Madhesh	46,017	58.93	10	
Katahariya	कटहरीया	Rautahat	Madhesh	45,821	40.69	9	
Loharpatti	लोहरपट्टी	Mahottari	Madhesh	45,773	50.06	9	
Paroha	परोहा	Rautahat	Madhesh	45,702	37.45	9	
Hansapur	हंसपुर	Dhanusha	Madhesh	44,949	48.71	9	
Kamala	कमला	Dhanusha	Madhesh	44,597	65.85	9	
Kabilasi	कविलासी	Sarlahi	Madhesh	44,204	48.11	10	
Ganeshman Charanath	गणेशमान चारनाथ	Dhanusha	Madhesh	44,082	244.31	11	
Bahudarmai	बहुदरमाई	Parsa	Madhesh	43,478	31.55	9	
Haripur	हरिपुर	Sarlahi	Madhesh	43,233	66.86	9	
Diktel Rupakot Majhuwagadhi	रुपाकोट–मजुवागढी	Khotang	Koshi	43,008	246.51	15	
Dodhara Chandani	दोधारा चादँनी	Kanchanpur	Sudurpashchim	42,974	56.84	10	
Bhanu	भानु	Tanahun	Gandaki	42,794	184	13	
Chautara Sangachokgadhi	चौतारा साँगाचोकगढी	Sindhupalchok	Bagmati	42,668	165.25	14	
Sandhikharka	सन्धिखर्क	Arghakhanchi	Lumbini	42,492	129.42	12	
Phatuwa Bijayapur	फतुवाबिजयपुर	Rautahat	Madhesh	42,218	65.24	11	
Pyuthan	प्यूठान	Pyuthan	Lumbini	42,130	128.96	10	
Sukhipur	सुखीपुर	Siraha	Madhesh	42,033	54.78	10	
Putalibazar	पुतलीबजार	Syangja	Gandaki	41,743	147.21	14	
Parsagadhi	पर्सागढी	Parsa	Madhesh	41,569	99.69	9	
Melamchi	मेलम्ची	Sindhupalchok	Bagmati	41,063	158.17	13	
Madhav Narayan	माधव नारायण	Rautahat	Madhesh	40,894	48.53	9	
Rampur	रामपुर	Palpa	Lumbini	40,883	123.34	10	
Pacharauta	पचरौता	Bara	Madhesh	40,524	44.01	9	
Gaur	गौर	Rautahat	Madhesh	39,846	21.53	9	
Manthali	मन्थली	Ramechhap	Bagmati	39,695	211.78	14	
Shambhunath	शम्भुनाथ	Saptari	Madhesh	39,634	108.71	12	
Boudhimai	बौधीमाई	Rautahat	Madhesh	39,325	34.343	9	
Dullu	दुल्लु	Dailekh	Karnali	39,143	156.77	13	
Thaha	थाहा	Makawanpur	Bagmati	38,870	191.12	12	
Haripurwa	हरिपुर्वा	Sarlahi	Madhesh	38,714	30.50	9	
Dewahi Gonahi	देवाही गोनाही	Rautahat	Madhesh	38,690	33.99	9	
Karjanha	कर्जन्हा	Siraha	Madhesh	38,557	76.84	11	
Madi	माडी	Chitwan	Bagmati	38,295	218.24	9	
Puchaudi	पुर्चौडी	Baitadi	Sudurpashchim	38,281	198.52	10	
Mithila Bihari	मिथिला बिहारी	Dhanusa	Madhesh	38,273	37.6	10	
Besisahar	बेसीशहर	Lamjung	Gandaki	38,232	127.64	11	
Letang	लेटाङ	Morang	Koshi	38,152	219.23	9	
Kushma	कुश्मा	Parbat	Gandaki	38,101	93.18	14	
Nagarain	नगराईन	Dhanusha	Madhesh	38,037	39.00	9	
Bheri	भेरी	Jajarkot	Karnali	37,892	219.77	13	
Chhedagad	छेडागाड	Jajarkot	Karnali	37,877	284.2	13	
Bideha	विदेह	Dhanusha	Madhesh	37,697	45.51	9	
Sitganga	सितगंगा	Arghakhanchi	Lumbini	37,691	610.43	14	
Nijgadh	निजगढ	Bara	Madhesh	37,687	289.43	13	
Pokhariya	पोखरिया	Parsa	Madhesh	37,675	32.47	10	
Palungtar	पालुङटार	Gorkha	Gandaki	37,409	158.62	10	
Aurahi	औरही	Mahottari	Madhesh	37,361	35.76	9	
Ramgopalpur	रामगोपालपुर	Mahottari	Madhesh	36,201	39.58	9	
Matihani	मटिहानी	Mahottari	Madhesh	36,136	29.02	9	
Dhankuta	धनकुटा	Dhankuta	Koshi	35,983	111	10	
Aathabiskot	आठविसकोट	Rukum West	Karnali	35,917	560.34	14	
Panchapuri	पञ्चपुरी	Surkhet	Karnali	35,839	329.9	11	
Rajdevi	राजदेवी	Rautahat	Madhesh	35,658	28.21	9	
Parshuram	परशुराम	Dadeldhura	Sudurpashchim	35,590	414.07	12	
Khandbari	खादँवारी	Sankhuwasabha	Koshi	35,565	122.78	11	
Panchkhal	पाँचखाल	Kavrepalanchok	Bagmati	35,521	103	13	
Rolpa	रोल्पा	Rolpa	Lumbini	35,376	270.42	10	
Belkotgadhi	बेलकोटगढी	Nuwakot	Bagmati	35,224	155.6	13	
Bhimeshwar	भीमेश्वर	Dolakha	Bagmati	34,712	132.5	9	
Sharada	शारदा	Salyan	Karnali	34,663	198.34	15	
Musikot	मुसिकोट	Western Rukum	Karnali	34,270	136.06	14	
Bagchaur	बागचौर	Salyan	Karnali	34,021	163.14	12	
Dipayal Silgadhi	दिपायल सिलगढी	Doti	Sudurpashchim	33,968	126.62	9	
Bungal	बुंगल	Bajhang	Sudurpashchim	33,812	447.59	11	
Dhulikhel	धुलिखेल	Kavrepalanchok	Bagmati	33,726	55	12	
Bangad Kupinde	बनगाड कुपिण्डे	Salyan	Karnali	32,940	338.21	12	
Beni	बेनी	Myagdi	Gandaki	32,697	76.57	10	
Maulapur	मौलापुर	Rautahat	Madhesh	32,325	34.75	9	
Swargadwari	स्वर्गद्वारी	Pyuthan	Lumbini	32,037	224.7	9	
Lekbeshi	लेकबेशी	Surkhet	Karnali	31,710	180.92	10	
Dasharathchand	दशरथचन्द	Baitadi	Sudurpashchim	31,567	135.15	11	
Resunga	रेसुङ्गा	Gulmi	Lumbini	31,551	83.74	14	
Aathabis	आठबीस	Dailekh	Karnali	31,092	168	9	
Galyang	गल्याङ	Syangja	Gandaki	31,034	122.71	11	
Deumai	देउमाई	Ilam	Koshi	30,969	191.63	9	
Mai	माई	Ilam	Koshi	30,732	246.11	10	
Galkot	गल्कोट	Baglung	Gandaki	30,588	194.39	11	
Shikhar	शिखर	Doti	Sudurpashchim	30,399	285.37	11	
Mandan Deupur	मण्डनदेउपुर	Kavrepalanchok	Bagmati	30,381	89	12	
Dhorpatan	ढोरपाटन	Baglung	Gandaki	30,068	222.85	9	
Shadananda	षडानन्द	Bhojpur	Koshi	29,342	241.15	14	
Shankharapur	शङ्खरापुर	Kathmandu	Bagmati	29,318	60.21	9	
Bhimad	भिमाद	Tanahun	Gandaki	29,248	129	9	
Patan	पाटन	Baitadi	Sudurpashchim	29,230	219.26	10	
Dhunibeshi	धुनीबेंशी	Dhading	Bagmati	29,149	96.3	9	
Chaurjahari	चौरजहारी	Western Rukum	Karnali	28,956	107.38	14	
Nalgad	नलगाड	Jajarkot	Karnali	28,922	387.44	13	
Musikot	मुसिकोट	Gulmi	Lumbini	28,454	114.74	9	
Phungling	फुङलिङ	Taplejung	Koshi	28,449	125.57	11	
Bhumikasthan	भूमिकास्थान	Arghakhanchi	Lumbini	28,192	159.13	10	
Siddhicharan	सिद्दिचरण	Okhaldhunga	Koshi	27,351	167.88	12	
Halesi Tuwachung	हलेसी तुवाचुङ	Khotang	Koshi	27,078	280.17	11	
Sundarbazar	सुन्दरबजार	Lamjung	Gandaki	27,043	72.05	11	
Chainpur	चैनपुर	Sankhuwasabha	Koshi	26,799	223.69	11	
Chamunda Bindrasaini	चामुण्डा विन्द्रासैनी	Dailekh	Karnali	26,559	90.6	9	
Mangalsen	मंगलसेन	Achham	Sudurpashchim	26,557	220.14	14	
Dakshinkali	दक्षिणकाली	Kathmandu	Bagmati	26,372	42.68	9	
Namobuddha	नमोबुद्ध	Kavrepalanchok	Bagmati	26,160	102	11	
Narayan	नारायण	Dailekh	Karnali	26,111	110.63	11	
Panchadewal Binayak	पञ्चदेवल विनायक	Achham	Sudurpashchim	26,088	147.75	9	
Bhojpur	भोजपुर	Bhojpur	Koshi	26,007	159.51	12	
Sanphebagar	साफेबगर	Achham	Sudurpashchim	25,891	166.71	14	
Solu Dudhkunda	सोलुदुधकुण्ड	Solukhumbu	Koshi	25,678	528.09	11	
Ramechhap	रामेछाप	Ramechhap	Bagmati	24,971	202.45	9	
Jaimini	जैमिनी	Baglung	Gandaki	24,628	118.71	10	
Chhayanath Rara	छायाँनाथ रारा	Mugu	Karnali	24,527	480.67	14	
Amargadhi	अमरगढी	Dadeldhura	Sudurpashchim	24,149	139.33	11	
Barhabise	बाह्रविसे	Sindhupalchok	Bagmati	24,109	96.73	9	
Mahakali	महाकाली	Darchula	Sudurpashchim	24,081	135.11	9	
Saptakoshi	सप्तकोशी	Saptari	Madhesh	23,510	60.25	11	
Chapakot	चापाकोट	Syangja	Gandaki	22,969	120.59	10	
Bhirkot	भिरकोट	Syangja	Gandaki	22,645	78.23	9	
Khandachakra	खाँडाचक्र	Kalikot	Karnali	22,274	133.29	11	
Mahalaxmi	महालक्ष्मी	Dhankuta	Koshi	22,182	126.3	9	
Madhya Nepal	मध्यनेपाल	Lamjung	Gandaki	21,971	113.86	10	
Jaya Prithvi	जयपृथ्वी	Bajhang	Sudurpashchim	21,933	166.79	11	
Shailyashikhar	शैल्यशिखर	Darchula	Sudurpashchim	21,807	117.81	9	
Chandannath	चन्दननाथ	Jumla	Karnali	21,036	102.03	10	
Kamalbazar	कमलबजार	Achham	Sudurpashchim	21,032	120.78	10	
Melauli	मेलौली	Baitadi	Sudurpashchim	20,658	119.43	9	
Phalebas	फलेवास	Parbat	Gandaki	20,468	85.7	11	
Budhiganga	बुढीगंगा	Bajura	Sudurpashchim	20,185	59.2	10	
Budhinanda	बुढीनन्दा	Bajura	Sudurpashchim	20,072	232.48	10	
Pakhribas	पाख्रिवास	Dhankuta	Koshi	19,104	144.29	10	
Myanglung	म्याङलुङ	Terathum	Koshi	18,750	100.21	10	
Badimalika	बडीमालिका	Bajura	Sudurpashchim	18,414	276	9	
Tribeni	त्रिवेणी	Bajura	Sudurpashchim	17,798	170.32	9	
Raskot	रास्कोट	Kalikot	Karnali	17,425	59.73	9	
Rainas	रार्इनास	Lamjung	Gandaki	17,402	71.97	10	
Panchkhapan	पाँचखपन	Sankhuwasabha	Koshi	16,348	148.03	9	
Tilagupha	तिलागुफा	Kalikot	Karnali	16,197	262.56	11	
Jiri	जिरी	Dolakha	Bagmati	16,109	211.27	9	
Dharmadevi	धर्मदेवी	Sankhuwasabha	Koshi	16,053	132.82	9	
Laligurans	लालिगुराँस	Terathum	Koshi	15,329	90.27	9	
Madi	मादी	Sankhuwasabha	Koshi	13,273	110.1	9	
Tripura Sundari	त्रिपुरासुन्दरी	Dolpa	Karnali	12,233	393.54	11	
Thuli Bheri	ठूली भेरी	Dolpa	Karnali	9,861	421.34	11	

== See also ==
- Municipalities of Nepal — all city/urban + rural municipalities.
  - Municipalities of Nepal topics
- Gaupalikas−Rural Municipalities of Nepal — current rural municipality + local government subdivision (est. 2017).
  - List of gaupalikas−rural municipalities of Nepal
  - Rural Municipalities of Nepal topics
- Village development committees of Nepal (VDC) — former rural municipality + local government subdivision (1990-2016).
  - List of village development committees of Nepal — (1990-2001).
- Subdivisions of Nepal
