= Bhramarpura =

Village in Nepal

Bhramarpura भ्रमरपुर
- Village
- Location within Nepal
- Coordinates: 26.73333°N 85.85°E
- Country: Nepal
- Zone: Janakpur Zone
- District: Mahottari District

Population (2011)
  - Total: 9,458
- Time zone: UTC+5:45 (Nepal Time)

Bhramarpura (Nepali: भ्रमरपुर) is a village in Nepal that is located six kilometers to west of Janakpurdham, and is in Loharpatti municipality ward 7, Mahottari district, Janakpur Zone. It is the most populous village in Mahottari.

With most of its villagers working overseas, Bhramarpura gets a 25 per cent of its income from remittances. As of 2011 Nepal census, the village had a population of 9458, and the people were living in 1734 individual households. Different faiths are practiced by the villagers residing in Bhramarpura with most following either Hinduism or Islam. People also identify among various castes of which Brahmin, Yadav, Teli, Sudhi, Mandal, etc. are observed by Hindus and Dhobi, Nadaf, are observed by Muslims.

For educational purposes, Bhramarpura has three secondary government schools, one of them being Shree Ram Dev Janta Higher Secondary School. Additionally, the village has some private boarding schools.

In May 2016, it was reported that due to labor migration to countries outside Nepal, and in particular the Gulf nations, Bhramarpura's women population exceeded that of men's. Despite the strain on village's manpower, the locals felt satisfactory by the constant flow of remittances to support their families. At the time, out of the village's 13,000 inhabitants, about 3000 went abroad to work.
