= Bagiya Banchauri =

Badiya Banchauri बगिया बनचौरी
- Village development committee (VDC)
- Country: Nepal
- Zone: Janakpur Zone
- District: Mahottari District

Population (1991)
  - Total: 5,142
- Time zone: UTC+5:45 (Nepal Time)

Badiya Banchauri is a village development committee in Mahottari District in the Janakpur Zone of south-eastern Nepal. At the time of the 1991 Nepal census it had a population of 5142 people living in 948 individual households.
