= Bramarpura =

Bhramarpura भ्रमरपुरा
- Village development committee
- Location in Nepal
- Coordinates: 26.73°N 85.86°E
- Country: Nepal
- Zone: Janakpur Zone
- District: Mahottari District

Population (2011)
  - Total: 9,458
- Time zone: UTC+5:45 (Nepal Time)

Bhramarpura is a village development committee in Mahottari District in the Janakpur Zone of south-eastern Nepal. At the time of the 2011 Nepal census it had a population of 9458 people living in 1734 individual households.
