= Hariharpur Harinagari =

Coordinates: 26°50′N 85°53′E

Hariharpur Harinagari हरिहरपुर हरिनगरी
- Village development committee
- Interactive map of Hariharpur Harinagari
- Country: Nepal
- Zone: Janakpur Zone
- District: Mahottari District

Population (1991)
  - Total: 5,223
- Time zone: UTC+5:45 (Nepal Time)

Hariharpur Harinagari is a village development committee in Mahottari District in the Janakpur Zone of south-eastern Nepal. At the time of the 1991 Nepal census, it had a population of 5223 people living in 1030 individual households.
