= Krishna Hari Pushkar =

Nepalese bureaucrat (born 1974)

Finance Secretary of Nepal
- In office 13 September 2023 – 23 April 2024
- Appointed by: Council of Ministers of Nepal
- Preceded by: Arjun Prasad Pokharel
- Succeeded by: Madhu Kumar Marasini

Federal Affairs & General Administration Secretary of Nepal
- In office 14 April 2023 – 27 August 2023
- Appointed by: Council of Ministers of Nepal
- Preceded by: Arjun Prasad Pokharel
- Succeeded by: Binod Prakash Singh

Finance Secretary of Nepal
- In office 12 August 2022 – 6 January 2023
- Appointed by: Council of Ministers of Nepal
- Preceded by: Madhu Kumar Marasini
- Succeeded by: Toyam Rana

Revenue Secretary of Nepal
- In office 29 August 2021 – 12 August 2022
- Appointed by: Council of Ministers of Nepal
- Preceded by: Ram Sharan Pudasain
- Succeeded by: Rameshwor Dangal

Personal details
- Born: 28 July 1974 (age 52) Suga, Mahottari, Nepal
- Education: Ph.D. Tribhuvan University
- Occupation: Bureaucrat
- Awards: Sukirtimaya Rashtradeep Medal

Krishna Hari Pushkar (born 28 July 1974) is a retired Nepalese bureaucrat who served as the Government Secretary of Nepal in multiple ministries, including Ministry of Finance, Ministry of Federal Affairs and General Administration, and Ministry of Labour and Employment. He joined the civil service of Nepal on 31 January 1997.

== Early life and education ==
Krishna Hari Pushkar was born on 28 July 1974 in Suga (now Jaleshwar), Mahottari, Nepal. He completed his postgraduate degree in public administration from Tribhuvan University and earned Ph.D. in conflict peace and development studies from same institution in 2023.

== Civil Service career ==
Pushkar has served in various key posts during his civil service tenure of Government of Nepal, such as assistant chief district officer, director general of the foreign employment department, spokesperson of Commission for the Investigation of Abuse of Authority, economic counselor to India, and as the revenue secretary in the Ministry of Finance, federal affairs and general administration secretary in the MoFAGA, labour and employment secretary in the Ministry of Labour and Employment, and finance secretary in the Ministry of Finance in the Government of Nepal.

He was promoted to the first-class government post of secretary on 8 July 2021.He was retired from the civil service on 9 July 2026.

== Other roles ==
He was also appointed as an ex officio board member of Nepal Rastra Bank.. He was the spokesperson at the COVID-19 Crisis Management Centre, a government body formed to manage the COVID-19 pandemic in Nepal.

== Awards and recognition ==
He was awarded the Sukiritimaya Rashtradeep Medal by the government of Nepal in 2022 for his extraordinary civil service work.
