= Doodhmati =

River in Mithila

Doodhmati दूधमती
- Etymology: Milk of the divine Kamdhenu cow
- Nickname: Dhudmati

Location
- Country: Nepal and India
- Geographical: Mithila region
- District: Dhanusha, Mahottari and Madhubani

Basin features
- Cities: Kshireshwarnath, Janakpur

The Doodhmati (Maithili: दूधमती) is a river in the Indian subcontinent that flows on the plains of the Mithila region in Nepal. The origin of the Dudhmati river is at Arjawan village located in ward number 5 of the Kshireshwarnath Municipality in Nepal. It also flows through Janakpurdham. It is a sacred river and considered as Ganga in the city of Janakpur. It is a legendary heritage for Hindu adherents associated with Ramayana.

== Legends ==
According legends, Goddess Doodhmati is the personified form of the sacred river Doodhmati. She was one of the eight friends of the Goddess Sita in Mithila. Similarly in other legend, it is believed that a divine cow called Kamdhenu came to feed milk to Goddess Sita. Then this river was formed after the divine cow Kamdhenu poured milk from her breasts.

== Geography ==
The Doodhmati river originates at the villages of Arjawan and Sakhuwa in the ward number 5 of the Kshireshwarnath Municipality in the Mithila region of Nepal. It merges in the Bigghi river at Matihani in the Mahottari district near the Indo-Nepal International border. Later it becomes the part of the Dhouns River in India. Its total length is 46 kilometres. It is one of the oldest flowing river in the Mithila region of the Indian subcontinent.

== Religious significance ==
The Doodhmati is a sacred river in the Mithila region. In Hinduism, it is considered as an important place for sacred bathing, performing rituals for gods and ancestors. In Janakpurdham, Doodhmati Aarti is held at Basavitti during the Navami of Vaishakh. Similarly, the Vishwa Hindu Parishad performs special Aarti twice a month at Dudhmati, on the full moon and new moon days. Its sacred water is also used for performing Jalabhisheka on different shivlings of the Shiva temples in the region during the Sawan Sombari festival. During the festival, devotees carry the sacred water from the river and perform Jalabhisheka on the shivlings of Jaleshwar Nath Mahadev Mandir, Valmikeshwar Nath Mahadev Mandir and some other Shiva temples in the Mithila region.

The sacred water of the river was also sent to Ayodhya in India, during the Prana Pratishta ceremony of the Ram Mandir, for performing Jalabhisheka to the idol of Lord Rama in the temple.
