= Matihani, Mahottari =

Municipality in Mahottari District, Nepal

Matihani मटिहानी
- Municipality
- Matihani Municipality
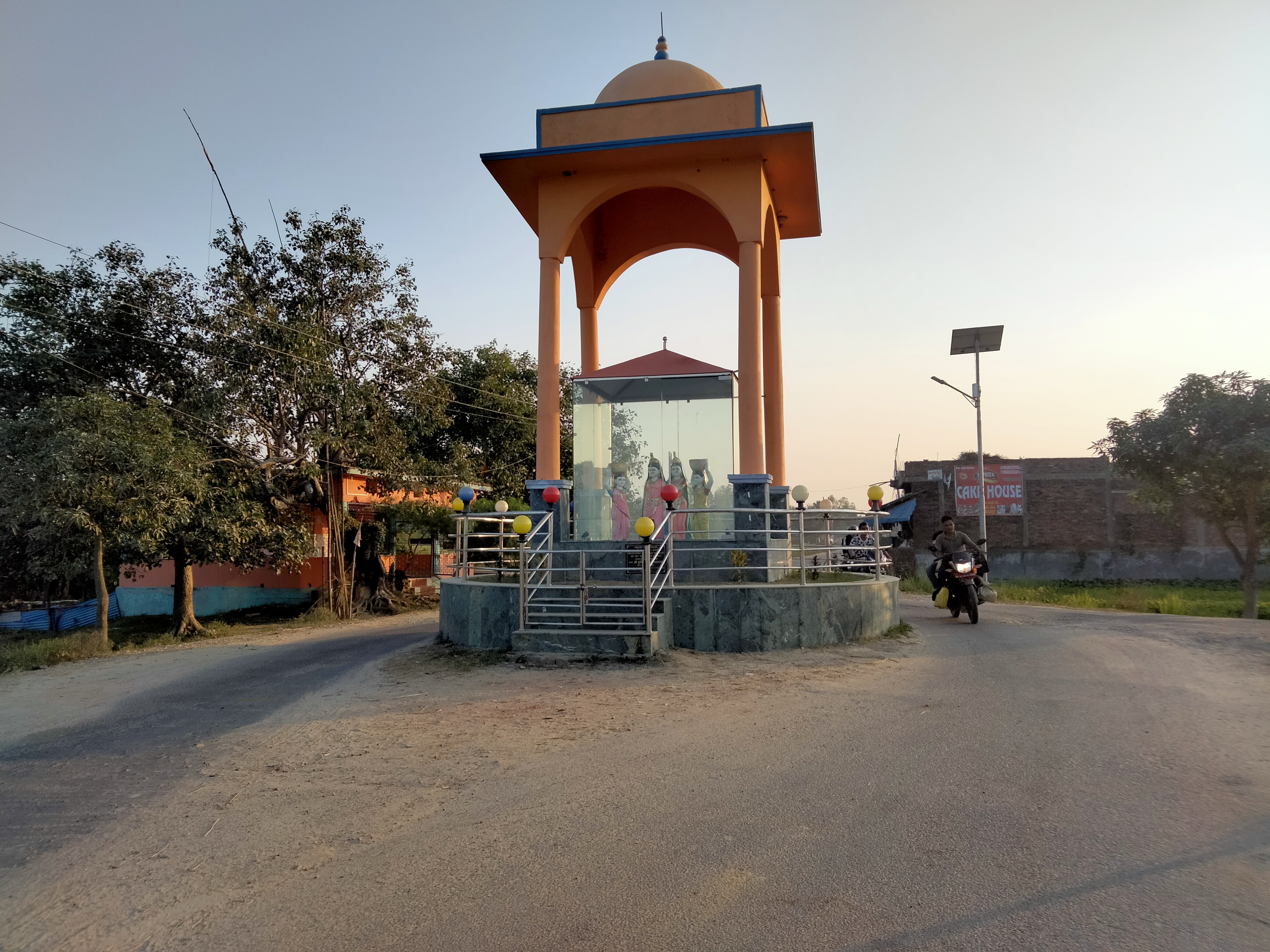
- Prasadi Baba Chowk, Matihani
- Interactive map of Matihani
- Country: Nepal
- Province: Madhesh Pradesh
- Region: Mithila
- District: Mahottari District
- District headquarter: Jaleshwar

Government
  - Mayor: Hari Prasad Mandal (Loktantrik Samajwadi Party)
  - Deputy Mayor: Manju Devi (Loktantrik Samajwadi Party)
- Demonym: Maithil

Matihani is a municipality in the Mahottari District of Madhesh Province, Nepal. It covers an area of 29.02 square kilometres (11.20 sq mi) and had a population of 36,136 as of 2021. The municipality was formed in 2017 by merging Matihani, Dhirapur, Majhora Bishnupur and Simardahi village development committees.

== Geography and location ==
Matihani is located near the Indo-Nepal border, adjacent to Madhwapur, India. The Dhouns and Doodhmati rivers flow through the municipality's outskirts, with the latter merging into the former near the town. Key landmarks include the Matihani Nagarpalika Gate and Prasadi Baba Chowk.

== Historical and cultural significance ==
Matihani holds cultural importance due to its association with the Ramayana. It is linked to the Matkor ceremony, a traditional ritual in Mithila weddings, believed to have been performed for Sita and Rama in the Treta Yuga. During the annual Vivaha Panchami festival in nearby Janakpur, mud from the Lakshmi Narayan Sagar pond in Matihani is used for the Bedi ritual in the Matkor ceremony.

The municipality is a significant religious site in Hinduism. The Lakshminarayan Matha, one of the largest temples of its kind in Nepal, is located at the town's center, alongside the Lakshmi Narayan Sagar pond. The Matha is a major centre in the region for organising the grand festival of the Mithila Jhulnotsav dedicated to Lord Rama and Goddess Sita. Matihani is also part of the Mithila Madhya Parikrama, with the Parikrama Gachhi serving as a key stop in this sacred pilgrimage. The Bharat-Nepal Maitri Chhath Ghat on the Dhouns River is a shared site for the Chhath festival, celebrated by communities from both India and Nepal.

== Education ==
Matihani is home to the Yjnayavalkya Lakshminarayan Vidyapeeth, a constituent unit of Nepal Sanskrit University, offering Sanskrit and Hindu Vedic education to students from Nepal and India. Established by the Sena dynasty, it is one of Nepal's oldest Sanskrit schools and is located near the Indo-Nepal border. Other educational institutions include a government school and smaller local schools. Damodar Academy in Parikauli, approximately 10 km from Matihani, provides bus services for students. Some children also attend Delhi Public School in India, 4-5 km away, crossing the border for education.

== Gallery ==
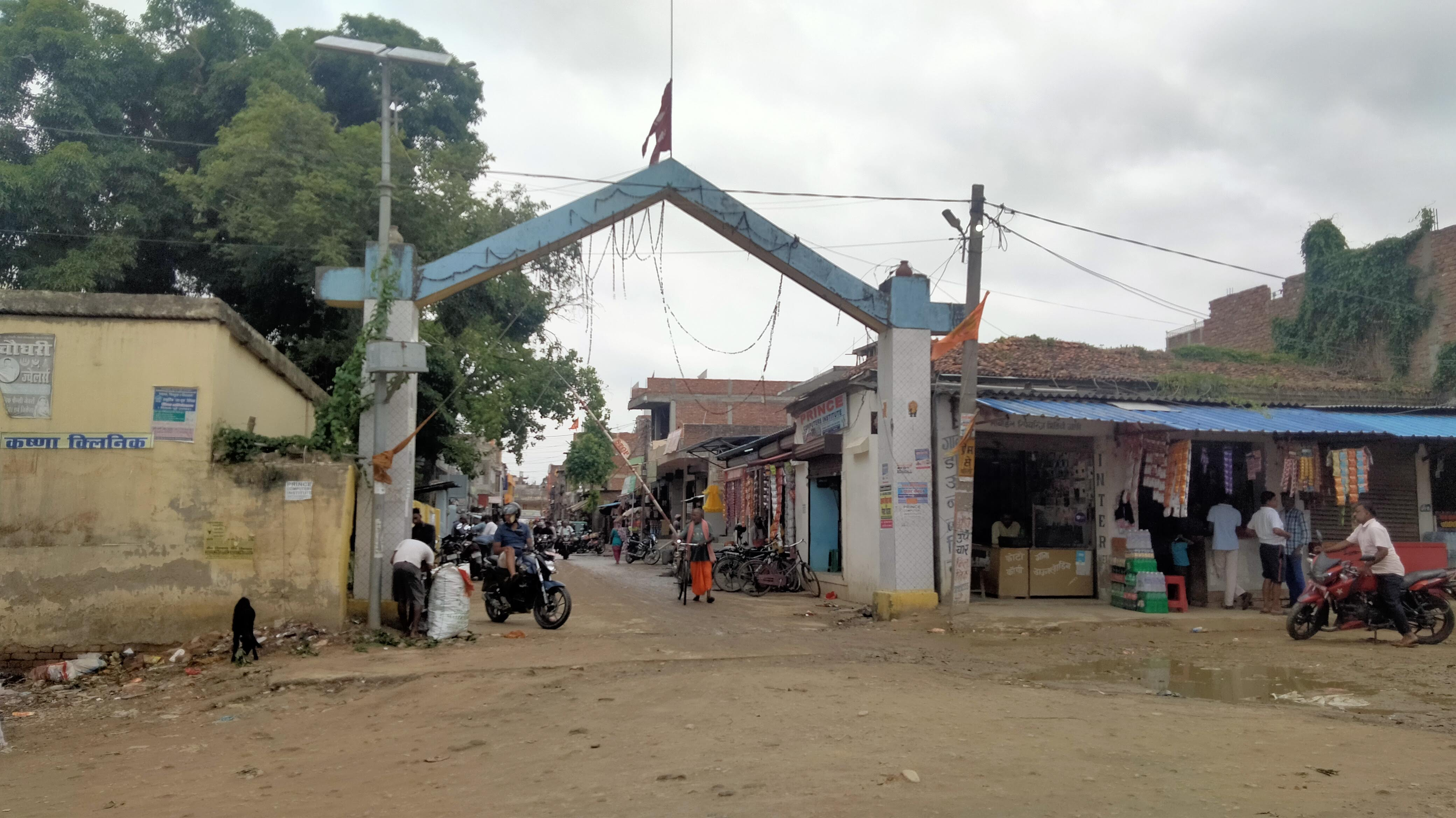
View of the Chhoti Bhansar Gate at Dasgaja (Indo-Nepal border) in Matihani.

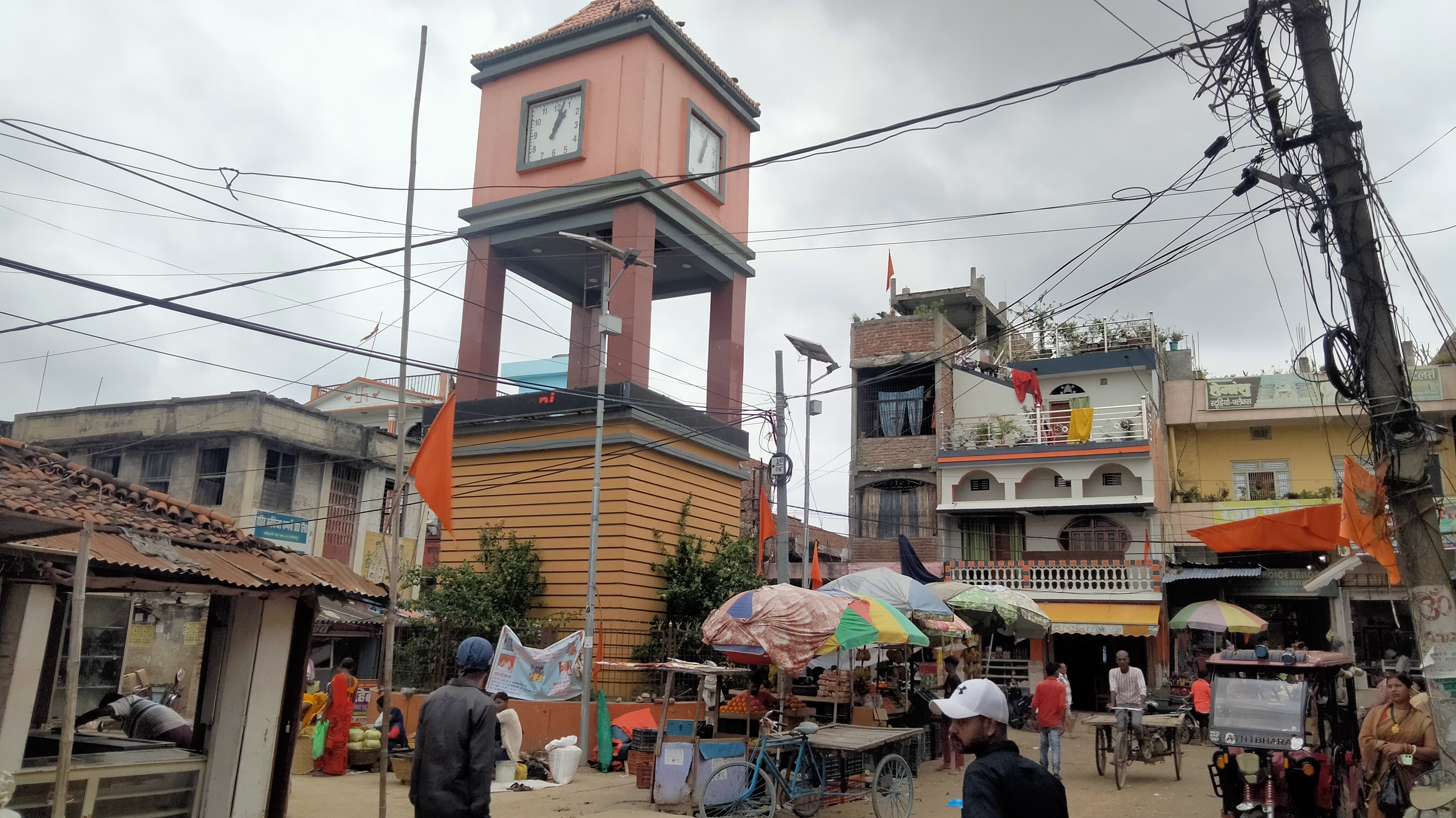
View of the Iconic clock tower at Matihani Bazaar

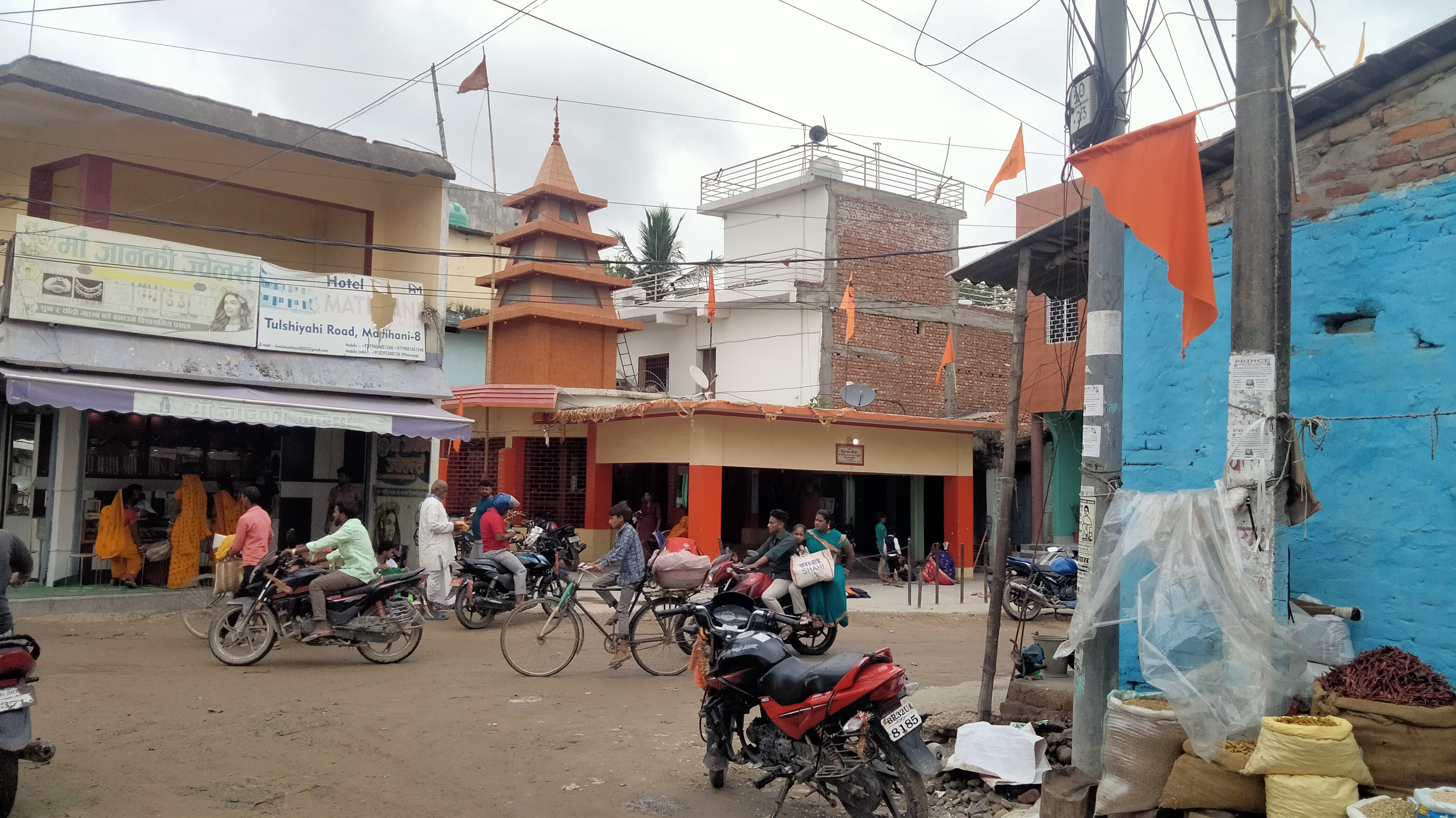
Hanuman Mandir in Matihani

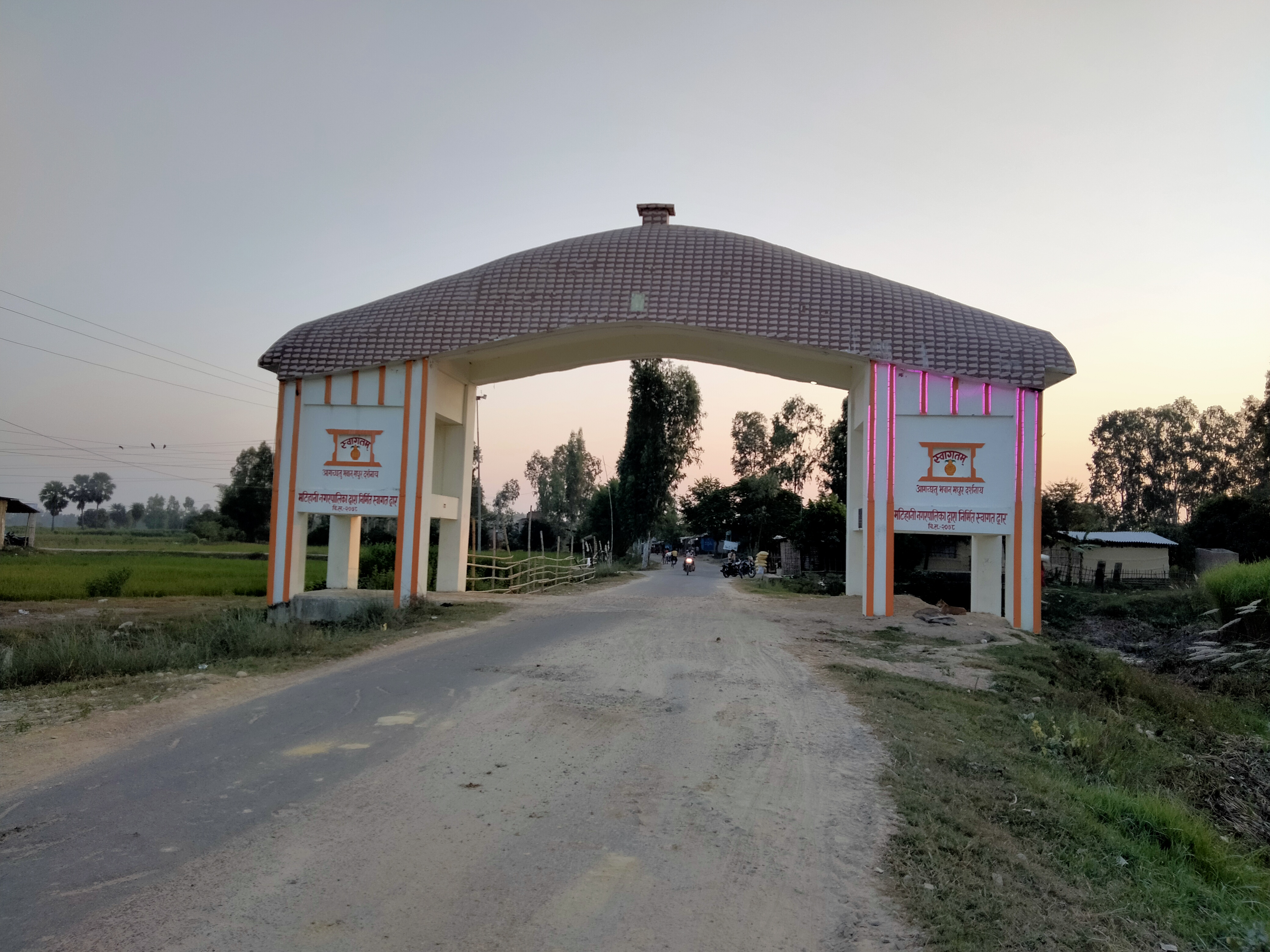
Matihani Nagarpalika Gate

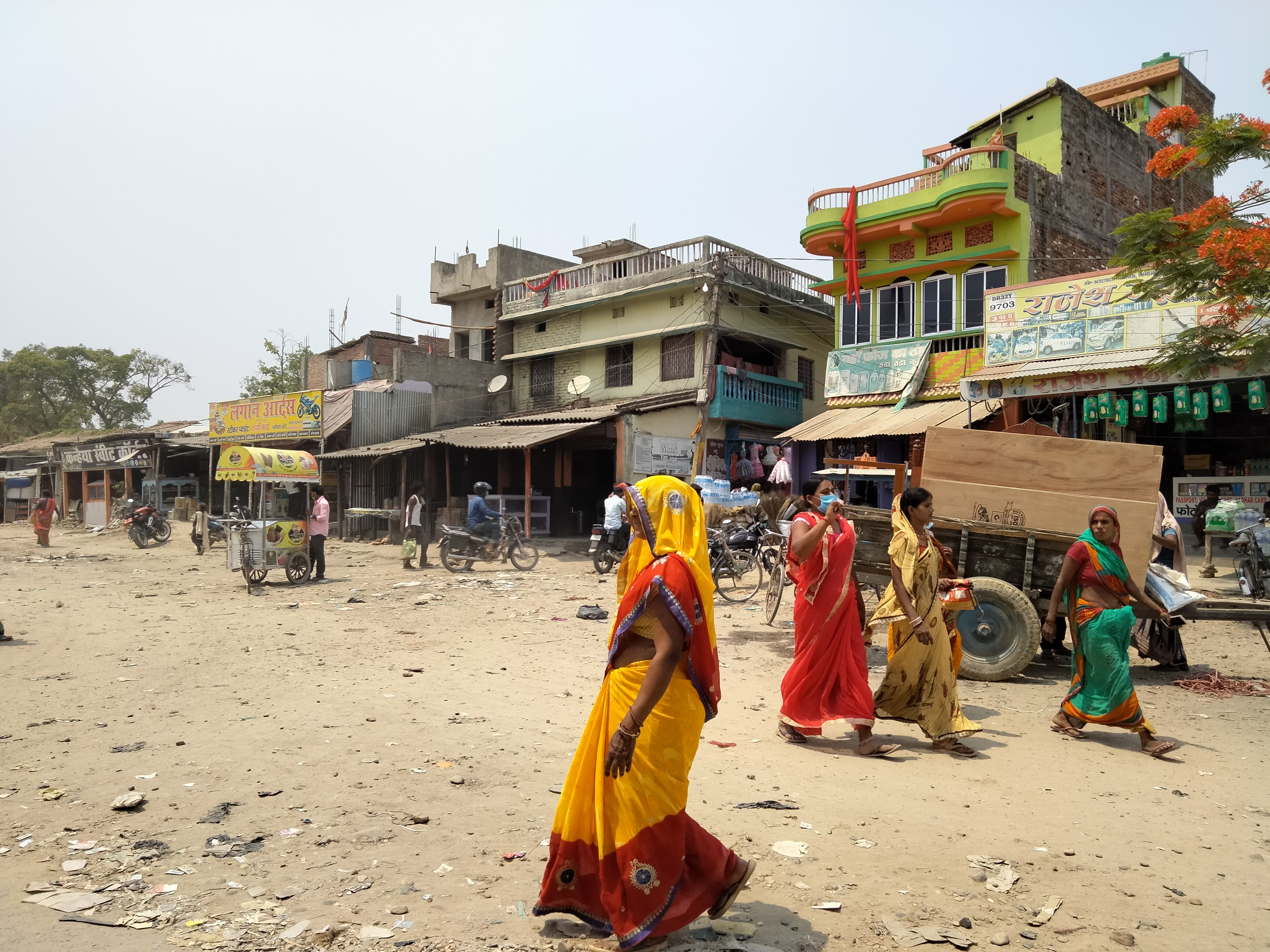
Nepal side view at the Dasgaja of the Indo-Nepal border in Matihani-Madhwapur (Gandhi Chowk)
