= Etaharwakatti =

Etaharwakatti इटहर्वाकट्टी
- Village development committee
- Location in Nepal
- Coordinates: 26.75°N 85.75°E
- Country: Nepal
- Zone: Janakpur Zone
- District: Mahottari District

Population (1991)
  - Total: 5,209
- Time zone: UTC+5:45 (Nepal Time)

Etaharwakatti is a village development committee in Mahottari District in the Janakpur Zone of south-eastern Nepal. At the time of the 1991 Nepal census it had a population of 5209 people living in 859 individual households.
