= Damhi Marai =

Damhi Marai डाम्ही मरई
- Village development committee
- Country: Nepal
- Zone: Janakpur Zone
- District: Mahottari District

Population (1991)
  - Total: 7,734
- Time zone: UTC+5:45 (Nepal Time)

Damhi Marai is a village development committee in Mahottari District in the Janakpur Zone of south-eastern Nepal. At the time of the 1991 Nepal census it had a population of 7734 people living in 1401 individual households.
