= Pokharibhinda Samgrampur =

Coordinates: 26°47′N 85°45′E

Pokharvinda Sangrampur पोखरभिण्डा
- Village development committee
- Interactive map of Pokharvinda Sangrampur
- Country: Nepal
- Zone: Janakpur Zone
- District: Mahottari District

Government
  - Type: Bipin Devdas

Population (1991)
  - Total: 3,549
- Time zone: UTC+5:45 (Nepal Time)

Pokharibhinda Samgrampur is a village development committee in Mahottari District in the Janakpur Zone of south-eastern Nepal. At the time of the 1991 Nepal census it had a population of 3549 people living in 699 individual households.
