= Shamsi, Nepal =

Samsi, Nepal समसी
- Village development committee
- Location in Nepal
- Coordinates: 26.81°N 85.74°E
- Country: Nepal
- Zone: Janakpur Zone
- District: Mahottari District

Government
  - Type: Federal
  - Mayor: Aatif Nawaz

Population (1991)
  - Total: 3,258
- Time zone: UTC+5:45 (Nepal Time)

Samsi, Nepal is a village development committee in Mahottari District in the Janakpur Zone of south-eastern Nepal. At the time of the 1991 Nepal census it had a population of 3258 people living in 554 individual households.
