= Ramnagar, Mahottari =

Ramnagar, Mahottari रामनगर
- Interactive map of Ramnagar, Mahottari
- Country: Nepal
- Province: Madhesh Province
- District: Mahottari District

Population (1991)
  - Total: 5,163
- Time zone: UTC+5:45 (Nepal Time)

Ramnagar is a town and marketplace in Gaushala Municipality in Mahottari District in the Madhesh Province in south-eastern Nepal. The municipality was established on 18 May 2014 by merging existing Nigauli, Ramnagar, and Gaushala VDCs. At the time of the 1991 Nepal census it had a population of 5,163 people residing in 952 individual households.
