= Laxminiya =

Laxminiya may refer to:

- Laxminiya, Janakpur, Nepal
- Laxminiya, Narayani, Nepal
- Laxminiya, Sagarmatha, Nepal
