= Pigauna =

Pigauna पिगौना
- Village development committee
- Location in Nepal
- Coordinates: 26.66°N 85.83°E
- Country: Nepal
- Zone: Janakpur Zone
- District: Mahottari District

Government Nepal
  - Type: VDC
  - Contribution: Rajan raaz pandey

Population (1991)
  - Total: 3,258
- Time zone: UTC+5:45 (Nepal Time)

VDC Map of Mahottari District

Pigauna is a village development committee in Mahottari District in the Janakpur Zone of south-eastern Nepal. At the time of the 1991 Nepal census it had a population of 3258 people living in 554 individual households.
