= Manara, Nepal =

Manara, Nepal मनरा
- Village development committee
- Location in Nepal
- Coordinates: 26.73°N 85.75°E
- Country: Nepal
- Zone: Janakpur Zone
- District: Mahottari District

Population (1991)
  - Total: 5,198
- Time zone: UTC+5:45 (Nepal Time)

Manara, Nepal is a village development committee in Mahottari District in the Janakpur Zone of south-eastern Nepal. At the time of the 1991 Nepal census, it had a population of 5,198 people living in 891 households. Since that census (about 15 years later), Manara has experienced a significant population decline.
