= Sonama Rural Municipality =

Sonama

सोनमा गाउँपालिका नेपालको मधेश प्रदेश, महोत्तरी जिल्लामा अवस्थित एक स्थानीय तह हो। यो गाउँपालिकालाई सन २०७३ (२०१६) मा ८ वटा पूर्वगाउँ विकास समिति (VDC) हरू समावेश गरी स्थापना गरिएको हो। यसले ५७.७७ वर्ग किलोमिटर क्षेत्रफल ओगटेको छ र सन् २०२१ को जनगणनाअनुसार जम्मा ५१,७३२ जना जनसंख्या रहेको छ ।

गाउँपालिकाको स्थानीय भाषा मैथिली, र नेपाली हुन् र मुख्य धर्म हिन्दू धर्म हो। समय क्षेत्र नेपालको मानक समय (UTC +5:45) अनुसार सञ्चालित हुन्छ र यसको डाक कोड ४५७०० हो ।

२०२१ पछिको निर्वाचनपछि सोनमा गाउँपालिकाको मेयरको पदमा बिशेश्वर प्रसाद यादव निर्वाचित हुनुहुन्छ ।

सोनमा गाउँपालिका
Sonama rural municipality
Sonama Location in Nepal
Country	Nepal
Development Region	Central
Zone	Janakpur
District	Mahottari District
Province	Madhesh Province
Government
• Mayor	Bisheshwar Prasad Yadav
Area
• Total	57.77 km^{2} (22.80 sq mi)
Population (2021)
• Total	51,732
• Density	900/km^{2} (2,300/sq mi)
• Religions	Hindu
Languages
• Local	Maithili, Tharu, Nepali
Time zone	UTC+5:45 (NST)
Postal Code	45700
Area code	044
Website https://sonmamun.gov.np/
