= Sonaum =

Coordinates: 26°46′N 85°46′E

Sonaul सोनौल
- Village development committee
- Interactive map of Sonaul
- Country: Nepal
- Zone: Janakpur Zone
- District: Mahottari District

Population (1991)
  - Total: 2,842
- Time zone: UTC+5:45 (Nepal Time)

Sonaul is a village development committee in Mahottari District in the Janakpur Zone of south-eastern Nepal. At the time of the 1991 Nepal census it had a population of 2842 people living in 506 individual households.

          - Ajit Yadav [1]
