= Ratauli =

Ratauli रातौली
- Village development committee
- Location in Nepal
- Coordinates: 26.73°N 85.88°E
- Country: Nepal
- Zone: Janakpur Zone
- District: Mahottari District

Area
  - Total: 8.78 km^{2} (3.39 sq mi)

Population (1991)
  - Total: 4,318
  - Density: 492/km^{2} (1,270/sq mi)
- Time zone: UTC+5:45 (Nepal Time)

Ratauli is a village development committee in Mahottari District in the Janakpur Zone of south-eastern Nepal. At the time of the 1991 Nepal census it had a population of 4318 people living in 788 individual households.
