= Padaul =

Coordinates: 26°45′N 85°49′E

Padaul पडौल
- Village development committee
- Interactive map of Padaul
- Country: Nepal
- Zone: Janakpur Zone
- District: Mahottari District

Population (1991)
  - Total: 4,806
- Time zone: UTC+5:45 (Nepal Time)

Padaul is a village development committee in Mahottari District in the Janakpur Zone of south-eastern Nepal. At the time of the 1991 Nepal census it had a population of 4806 people living in 868 individual households.
