= Sundarpur, Mahottari =

Coordinates: 26°54′N 85°44′E

Magarthana Jai baba mangalnath Magarthan
- Village Development Committee
- Nickname: Magarthana
- Interactive map of Magarthana
- Country: Nepal
- Zone: Janakpur Zone
- District: Mahottari District

Population (1991)
  - Total: 9,890
- Time zone: UTC+5:45 (Nepal Time)

Sundarpur is a Village Development Committee in Mahottari District in the Janakpur Zone of south-eastern Nepal. At the time of the 1991 Nepal census it had a population of 8971 people residing in 1766 individual households.
