= Halkhori =

Village development committee in Janakpur Zone, Nepal

- Village development committee
- Location in Nepal
- Coordinates: 26.67°N 85.76°E
- Country: Nepal
- Zone: Janakpur Zone
- District: Mahottari District

Population (2011)
  - Total: 6,033
- Time zone: UTC+5:45 (Nepal Time)

Halkhori is a village development committee in Mahottari District in the Janakpur Zone of south-eastern Nepal. At the time of the 2011 Nepal census it had a population of 6033 people living in 1051 individual households.
