= Sahorawa =

Sahorawa सहोरवा
- Village development committee
- Location in Nepal
- Coordinates: 26.71°N 85.88°E
- Country: Nepal
- Zone: Janakpur Zone
- District: Mahottari District

Population (2019)
  - Total: 8,342
- Time zone: UTC+5:45 (Nepal Time)

Sahorawa is a village development committee in Mahottari District in the Janakpur Zone of south-eastern Nepal. At the time of the 2019 it had a population of 8342.
