= Mahadaiyatapanpur =

Mahadaiyatapanpur महादैया तपानपुर
- Village development committee
- Location in Nepal
- Coordinates: 26.78°N 85.89°E
- Country: Nepal
- Zone: Janakpur Zone
- District: Mahottari District

Population (1991)
  - Total: 4,588
- Time zone: UTC+5:45 (Nepal Time)
- Postal code: 45703
- Area code: 45703
- Website: Mahadaiyatapanpur.com

Mahadaiyatapanpur is a village development committee in Mahottari District in the Janakpur Zone of south-eastern Nepal. At the time of the 1991 Nepal census it had a population of 4588 people living in 815 individual households.
