= Kolhusa Bagaiya =

Coordinates: 26°42′N 85°48′E

Kolhuwa Bagiya कोलहुवा बगिया
- Village
- Interactive map of Kolhuwa Bagiya
- Country: Nepal
- Zone: Janakpur Zone
- District: Mahottari District

Population (1991)
  - Total: 5,193
- Time zone: UTC+5:45 (Nepal Time)

Kolhuwa Bagiya is a village in Ekdara Rural Municipality in Mahottari District in the Janakpur Zone of south-eastern Nepal. At the time of the 1991 Nepal census it had a population of 5193 people living in 947 individual households. It is located in Ekdara Rural Municipality Ward No 6. Especially Kolhuwa is Most visited village for holy Goddess Mahodari Mata in the village pond. On Sundays and Tuesdays people come to bathe in the pond and wish for their goodness. Village also connected with National Highway(B.P. Highway). One of Oldest Schools of Nepal Shree Janta Higher Secondary School situated in Kolhuwa.
