= Meghanath Gorhanna =

Coordinates: 26°51′N 85°50′E

Meghanath Gorhanna मेघनाथ गोरहाना
- Village development committee
- Interactive map of Meghanath Gorhanna
- Country: Nepal
- Zone: Janakpur Zone
- District: Mahottari District

Population (1991)
  - Total: 4,612
- Time zone: UTC+5:45 (Nepal Time)

Meghanath Gorhanna is a village development committee in Mahottari District in the Janakpur Zone of south-eastern Nepal. At the time of the 1991 Nepal census it had a population of 4612 people living in 824 individual households.
