= Phulahatta Parikauli =

Phulahatta Parikauli फूलहट्टा परिकौली
- ward no -9, Jaleshwar Municipality
- Location in Nepal
- Coordinates: 26.67°N 85.82°E
- Nepal: Nepal
- Zone: Janakpur Zone
- District: Mahottari District

Population (2011)
  - Total: 9,300
- Time zone: UTC+5:45 (Nepal Time)
- Postal code: 45700
- Area code: 044

Phulahatta Parikauli is a village development committee in Mahottari District in the Janakpur Zone of south-eastern Nepal. At the time of the 1991 Nepal census it had a population of 4226 people living in 737 individual households. The village has 6 Schools among which Damodar Academy is affiliated with CBSE. Currently Rabindra Yadav is the ward councillor of ward no. 9 from this village.
