= Parsadewadh =

Coordinates: 26°50′N 85°45′E

Parsadewadh पर्सादेवध
- Village development committee
- Interactive map of Parsadewadh
- Country: Nepal
- Zone: Janakpur Zone
- District: Mahottari District

Population (1991)
  - Total: 6,781
- Time zone: UTC+5:45 (Nepal Time)

VDC Map of Mahottari District

Parsadewadh is a village development committee in Mahottari District in the Janakpur Zone of south-eastern Nepal. At the time of the 1991 Nepal census it had a population of 6779 people living in 1230 individual households.
