= Sisawakataiya =

Shiswa Kataiya शिसवा कटैया
- Village
- Location in Nepal
- Coordinates: 26.70°N 85.72°E
- Country: Nepal
- Zone: Janakpur Zone
- District: Mahottari District

Population (1991)
  - Total: 5,881
- Time zone: UTC+5:45 (Nepal Time)

Shiswa Kataiya is a village in Manara Shiswa Municipality in Mahottari District in the Janakpur Zone of south-eastern Nepal. At the time of the 1991 Nepal census it had a population of 5881 people living in 1004 individual households.
