= Raghunathpur, Mahottari =

Coordinates: 26°51′N 85°44′E

Raghunathpur, Mahottari रघुनाथपुर
- Village development committee
- Interactive map of Raghunathpur, Mahottari
- Country: Nepal
- Zone: Janakpur Zone
- District: Mahottari District

Population (1991)
  - Total: 4,079
- Time zone: UTC+5:45 (Nepal Time)

Raghunathpur, Mahottari is a village development committee in Mahottari District in the Janakpur Zone of south-eastern Nepal. At the time of the 1991 Nepal census it had a population of 4079 people living in 743 individual households.
