= Dharmapur, Nepal =

Dharmapur, Nepal धर्मपुर
- Village development committee
- Location in Nepal
- Coordinates: 26.82°N 85.87°E
- Country: Nepal
- Zone: Janakpur Zone
- District: Mahottari District

Population (1991)
  - Total: 4,244
- Time zone: UTC+5:45 (Nepal Time)

Dharmapur, Nepal is a village development committee in Mahottari District in the Janakpur Zone of south-eastern Nepal. At the time of the 1991 Nepal census it had a population of 4244 people living in 868 individual households.
