= Sarpallo =

Sarpallo सरपल्लो
- Village development committee
- Location in Nepal
- Coordinates: 26.75°N 85.78°E
- Country: Nepal
- Zone: Janakpur Zone
- District: Mahottari District

Population (1991)
  - Total: 7,159
- Time zone: UTC+5:45 (Nepal Time)

Sarpallo is a village development committee in Mahottari District in the Janakpur Zone of south-eastern Nepal. At the time of the 1991 Nepal census it had a population of 7159 people living in 1226 individual households. sarpallo is the place, where two river name called" Rato River & Geurkhi River meet each other. Sarpallo has mainly divided into two toal name called " Utarwari toal & Dhaxinwari toal" Sarpallo has two government schools. There is the river between Sarpallo and Balwa village. The first jhulange Bridge in Tarai sector is situated between Balwa and Sarpallo village. Sarpallo has also three major toal name called" Jhingasthan, Jaukh and Khusnagri. Sarpallo is the first village where both Utharwari toal and Daxinwaari toal end with the households of Rajput.
