= Majhora Bishnupur =

Majhora Bishnupur मझोरा विष्णुपुर
- Village development committee
- Location in Nepal
- Coordinates: 26.66°N 85.89°E
- Country: Nepal
- Zone: Janakpur Zone
- District: Mahottari District

Population (1991)
  - Total: 4,286
- Time zone: UTC+5:45 (Nepal Time)

Majhora Bishnupur is a village development committee in Mahottari District in the Janakpur Zone of south-eastern Nepal. In the 1991 Nepal census it had a population of 4286 people in 739 individual households.
