= Khuttapipradhi =

Coordinates: 26°45′N 85°52′E

Khuttapipradhi खुट्टापिपराढी
- Village development committee
- Interactive map of Khuttapipradhi
- Country: Nepal
- Zone: Janakpur Zone
- District: Mahottari District

Population (1991)
  - Total: 7,184
- Time zone: UTC+5:45 (Nepal Time)

Khuttapipradhi is a village development committee in Mahottari District in the Janakpur Zone of south-eastern Nepal. At the 1991 Nepal census, it had a population of 7,184 people in 1,387 households.
