= Anaittha =

Anaittha अनैठा
- Village
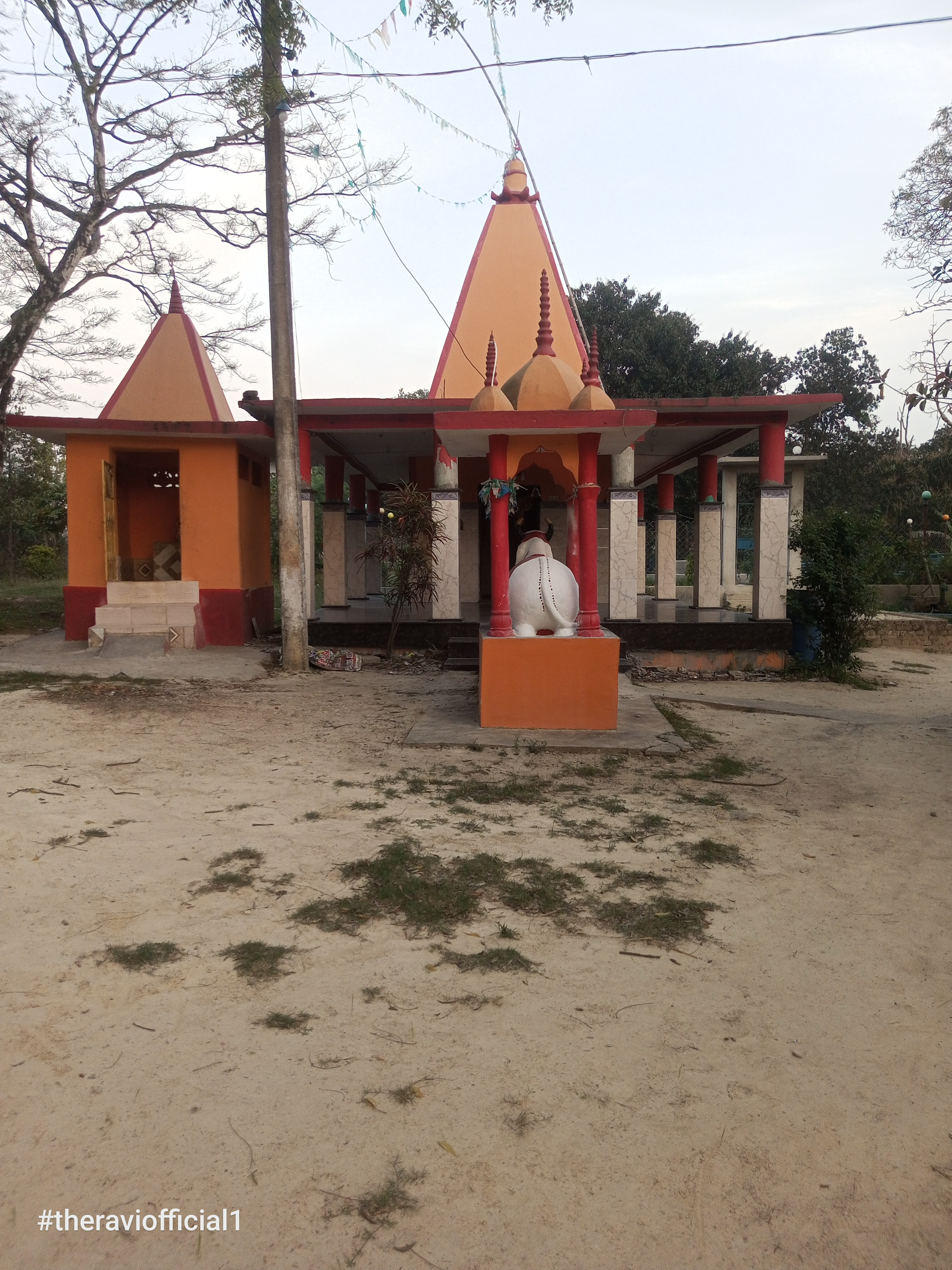
- Thareshwarnath Temple located in Anaittha.

- Location in Nepal
- Coordinates: 26°42′6″N 85°49′35″E
- Country: Nepal
- Province: Province No. 2
- District: Mahottari District
- Elevation: 53 m (174 ft)

Population
  - Total: 2,533
- Postal code: 45700
- Area code: 044

Anaittha (Nepali: अनैठा) is a settlement (village) in the ancient Mithila region. Located 13 km west of the current Janakpurdham city and 7 km northeast of Jaleshwarnath Dham city, this village is a mythological and historical site in Mahottari district, Mahottari Village Municipality Ward No. 2. The Thadeshwarnath Mahadev Temple, Thadi Pokhari, Brahmasthan, and Sonamai Sthan are heritage sites here. This village also falls under the Madhesh Pradesh capital (Janakpur), but due to unstable politics and uneducated people, this place remains backward. The people here used to grow food and do agriculture, but now due to population growth, there is not enough land left. Everything is becoming a settlement, which leads to people working and migrating abroad. In this village, people of various castes (Dhanuk, Yadav, Kalwar, Sonar, Musahar, Khatve, Teli, Kanu) live together with great love. The only language spoken here is Maithili. Speaking of its name, this place, located very close to the court of King Janak of Mithila, was a storehouse of food grains. However, during a famine in the Mithila region, the grain reserves were depleted, resulting in a lack of food. From that "no food" came the name Anaitha. There is a natural, mythological pond here called Thadi Pokhari. No one knows when and who excavated it. It is believed that this pond may have been dug out by demons in a single night. It is also believed that there was a time when this pond would feed hungry travelers and wanderers who would rest on its banks. Upon request, food would appear in a plate. People coming and going on this route used to stop here due to which it is called Thadi Pokhari. Even today people say that sitting here for some time makes the mind feel light and calm. It is believed that when the wedding procession of Shri Ram ji came to Mithila, they stayed here, that is why Thadeshwarnath Mahadev ji also resides here, whose very beautiful temple is also there. Along with Thadeshwarnath Mahadev, the temples of Parvati ji, Ram Laxman ji along with Hanuman, Lakshmi ji, Maharani ji, Ganga Maiya enhance the beauty of this place even more.
