= Bathnaha, Mahottari =

Coordinates: 26°41′N 85°44′E

Bathanaha बथनाहा
- Village development committee
- Interactive map of Bathanaha
- Country: Nepal
- Zone: Janakpur Zone
- District: Mahottari District

Government
  - Type: Ra. Ja. Pa. Mahanth Thakur has been elected from this constituency. By Harsha Nath Jha
  - Mrs.: Alka Jha

Population (1991)
  - Total: 7,210
- Time zone: UTC+5:45 (Nepal Time)

Bathnaha is a village development committee in Mahottari District in the Janakpur Zone of south-eastern Nepal. At the time of the 1991 Nepal census it had a population of 7210 people living in 1206 individual households.
