= Bairjiya Lakshminiya =

Bairagiya Lakshminiya बैरगिय़ा लक्ष्मीनिया
- Village Development Committee
- Location in Nepal
- Coordinates: 26.80°N 85.79°E
- Country: Nepal
- Zone: Janakpur Zone
- District: Mahottari District

Population (1991)
  - Total: 2,518
- Time zone: UTC+5:45 (Nepal Time)

Bairagiya Lakshminiya is a village development committee in Mahottari District in the Janakpur Zone of south-eastern Nepal. At the time of the 1991 Nepal census it had a population of 2518 people living in 478 individual households.
