= Samdha =

Sandha सांढा
- Village development committee
- Country: Nepal
- Zone: Janakpur Zone
- District: Mahottari District

Population (1991)
  - Total: 3,779
- Time zone: UTC+5:45 (Nepal Time)

Sandha is a village development committee in Mahottari District in the Janakpur Zone of south-eastern Nepal. At the time of the 1991 Nepal census it had a population of 3779 people living in 618 individual households.
