= Belgachhi =

Belgachhi बेलगाछी
- Village development committee
- Location in Nepal
- Coordinates: 26.98°N 85.81°E
- Country: Nepal
- Zone: Janakpur Zone
- District: Mahottari District

Population (1991)
  - Total: 4,377
- Time zone: UTC+5:45 (Nepal Time)

Belgachhi is a village development committee in Mahottari District in the Janakpur Zone of south-eastern Nepal. At the time of the 1991 Nepal census it had a population of 4377 people living in 821 individual households.
