= Khopi =

Khopi खोपी
- Village development committee
- Location in Nepal
- Coordinates: 26.84°N 85.78°E
- Country: Nepal
- Zone: Janakpur Zone
- District: Mahottari District

Population (1991)
  - Total: 5,566
- Time zone: UTC+5:45 (Nepal Time)

Khopi is a village development committee in Mahottari District in the Janakpur Zone of south-eastern Nepal. At the time of the 1991 Nepal census, it had a population of 5566 people living in 1047 individual households.
