= Simardahi =

Simardahi सिमरडाही
- Village development committee
- Location in Nepal
- Coordinates: 26.64°N 85.84°E
- Country: Nepal
- Zone: Janakpur Zone
- District: Mahottari District

Population (1991)
  - Total: 3,866
- Time zone: UTC+5:45 (Nepal Time)

Simardahi is a village development committee in Mahottari District in the Janakpur Zone of south-eastern Nepal. At the time of the 1991 Nepal census it had a population of 3866 people living in 716 individual households.
