= Valmikeshwar Nath Mahadev Mandir =

- वाल्मिकेश्वर नाथ महादेव मंदिर

Religion
- Affiliation: Hinduism
- District: Sitamarhi district
- Deity: Lord Shiva

Location
- Location: Sursand town, Mithila region
- State: Bihar
- Country: India
- Interactive map of Valmikeshwar Nath Mahadev Mandir
- Coordinates: 26.6544655°N 85.7303092°E

Architecture
- Type: Hinduism
- Style: Tirhut style
- Founder: Maharshi Valmiki
- Established: Treta Yuga
- Shivalinga established by Maharshi Valmiki

Valmikeshwar Nath Mahadev Mandir (Maithili: वाल्मिकेश्वर नाथ महादेव मंदिर) is an ancient temple of Lord Shiva at the outskirts of the Sursand town of Sitamarhi district in the Mithila region of Bihar. The temple is attributed to the Vedic sage Maharshi Valmiki.

== Etymology ==
According to the legend, it is said that the Shivalinga in the temple is believed to be originated from the ascetic site of Maharishi Valmiki. Therefore, it became famous after the name of the sage Valmiki called as Valmikeshwar Nath Mahadev. The temple is also known as Balmikeshwar Nath Mahadev Mandir or locally Baba Balmikeshwar Nath Mahadev Mandir.

== Description ==
Valmikeshwar Nath Mahadev Mandir is an ancient temple located in the Mithila region of Bihar. It is located at the outskirts of the Sursand town in the Sitamarhi district of Bihar. It is very close to the line of Indo - Nepal Border. According to legend, it is said that the Shivlinga of the temple was established by the Vedic sage Maharshi Valmiki. The Shivlinga of Lord Mahadev in the temple is installed 21 feet below the ground.

It is one of the major Shiva temples in the Mithila region for the devotees of Sawan Sombari pilgrimage. During the sacred Sawan month in Hinduism, a huge amount of devotees of Lord Shiva come here for performing holy Jalabhisheka on the Valmikeshwar Nath Mahadev Shivlinga. The sacred water from the Pahleja Ghat near Patna and Doodhmati River in Janakpurdham, Nepal are also brought for performing Jalabhisheka on the Shivling. Similarly every year during the Mahashivratri festival, a grand celebration of the Mahashivratri Puja is organised by the management of the temple in its campus. The devotees perform religious functions and rituals of the Mahashivratri Puja at the temple. According to legend, it is said that during the Lord Rama's Journey in Mithila, the Shivlinga of Valmikeshwar Nath Mahadev Mandir was worshipped by the Lord Rama along with his brother Lord Lakshmana and Guru Vishwamitra. Lord Rama came here for worshipping Lord Shiva's Lingam before and after taking part in the Sita Swayamvara at the court of King Janaka.

According to the president Pravin Jha of the temple, the present temple of the Valmikeshwar Nath Mahadev was built by the earlier King of the Sursand Raj. The king also donated some lands for the temple.

== Legend ==
There is a legendary story related to this temple about the enlightenment of Daaku Ratnakara as Maharshi Valmiki. In the ancient period this place was within the area of Mithila Kingdom governed by the King Janaka. The kingdom was terrified by the robber Ratnakara. It is said that once the robber Ratnakara was making plan to rob the treasure of the King Janaka. The King Janaka got the information of the plan by his Guptachar and decided to meet the robber Ratnakara. Then he took the form of a security guard of the treasury. According to the legend it is said that when the robber Ratnakara came to rob the treasure, he made the security guard hostage. After that the King Janaka in the form of security guard, asked the robber Ratnakara that if his family would share the sin he is doing. After that the robber Ratnakara went to his house and asked his family members about the sharing of the sin. But his family members denied to share the sin. After that he came to the King Janaka and asked the way of salvation. Then the King Janaka illustrated him the path of the salvation. It is said that after walking some distances he listened a strange Akashwani. In the Akashwani, he was told to did a penance at the present location of the temple. There he did a tough penance for a period of more than sixty years. According to the legendary story, it said that his body got covered by mud mound having termites in the long and tough penance.

Once again when the King went for excursion with his family, he took rest at place near the penance site to watch the beauty of the jungle. There his daughter while playing fingered into the mud mound, suddenly bleeding started from the mound. The king became astonished by seeing the bleeding. Then he ordered his securities to remove the mud mound and found that a hermit was doing penance in the mound. Then he told his daughter to look after the hermit till the end of the penance of the hermit. It is said that after a long and tough penance, the Lord Shiva appeared there and regained his beautiful physique. After that the robber Ratnakara got enlightenment and became famous with his new name Valmiki.
