= Basabitti =

Basabitti बसाबिट्टी
- Village development committee
- Location in Nepal
- Coordinates: 26.81°N 85.77°E
- Country: Nepal
- Zone: Janakpur Zone
- District: Mahottari District

Population (1991)
  - Total: 4,153
- Time zone: UTC+5:45 (Nepal Time)

Basabitti is a village development committee in Mahottari District in the Janakpur Zone of south-eastern Nepal. At the time of the 1991 Nepal census it had a population of 4,153 people living in 824 individual households.
