= Suga Bhawani =

Village development committee in Nepal

Coordinates: 26°37′N 85°49′E

Suga Bhawani सुगा भवानी Suga, Suga Bhawani Patti
- Village development committee
- Interactive map of Suga Bhawani
- Country: Nepal
- Zone: Janakpur Zone
- District: Mahottari District

Population (2011)
  - Total: 9,000+
- Time zone: UTC+5:45 (Nepal Time)

Suga Bhawani is a village development committee in Mahottari District in the Janakpur Zone of south-eastern Nepal. At the time of the 1991 Nepal census it had a population of 4527 people living in 726 individual households.
