= Lakshminiya, Mahottari =

Coordinates: 26°58′N 85°47′E

Lakshminiya लक्ष्मीनिया
- Village development committee
- Interactive map of Lakshminiya
- Country: Nepal
- Zone: Janakpur Zone
- District: Mahottari District

Population (1991)
  - Total: 7,540
- Time zone: UTC+5:45 (Nepal Time)

Lakshminiya is a village development committee in Mahottari District in the Janakpur Zone of south-eastern Nepal. At the time of the 1991 Nepal census it had a population of 7540 people living in 1444 individual households.
