= Balawa =

Balawa Balawa Municipality - बलवा नगरपालिका
- Village development committee
- Location in Nepal
- Coordinates: 26.76°N 85.80°E
- Country: Nepal
- Zone: Janakpur Zone
- District: Mahottari District

Population (2021)
  - Total: 50,031
- Time zone: UTC+5:45 (Nepal Time)

Balawa is a municipality in the core of Mahottari District of Janakpur Zone in south-eastern Nepal. The municipality has a hospital, bank, market, police station, business centre, playground, library, animal hospital, bus service, and college. There are direct road connections with Janakpur. The municipality has 11 wards, each with a representative. As of the 2021 Nepalese government census, the Balawa municipality is home to roughly 50,000 residents, of varying caste, creed, and ethnicity.
