= Manara Shiswa =

Manara Shiswa मनरा शिसवा
- Municipality
- Location in Nepal
- Coordinates: 26.72°N 85.73°E
- Country: Nepal
- Development Region: Central
- District: Mahottari District
- Province: Province No. 2
- Established: 2016 A.D. (2073 B.S.)

Government
  - Mayor: Mohan Pandey
  - Deputy Mayor: Shakuntala Devi

Area
  - Total: 49.73 km^{2} (19.20 sq mi)

Population (2011)
  - Total: 49,692
  - Density: 999.2/km^{2} (2,588/sq mi)
  - Religions: Hindu Muslim Christian

Languages
  - Local: Maithili, Tharu, Nepali
- Time zone: UTC+5:45 (NST)
- Postal Code: 45700
- Area code: 044
- Website: www.manarashiswamun.gov.np

Manara Shiswa (Nepali: मनरा शिसवा ) is a municipality in Mahottari District in Province No. 2 of Nepal. It was formed in 2016 occupying current 10 sections (wards) from previous 10 former VDCs. It occupies an area of 49.73 km^{2} with a total population of 49,692.
