= Gaushala, Mahottari =

Gaushala गौशाला
- Municipality (नगरपालिका)
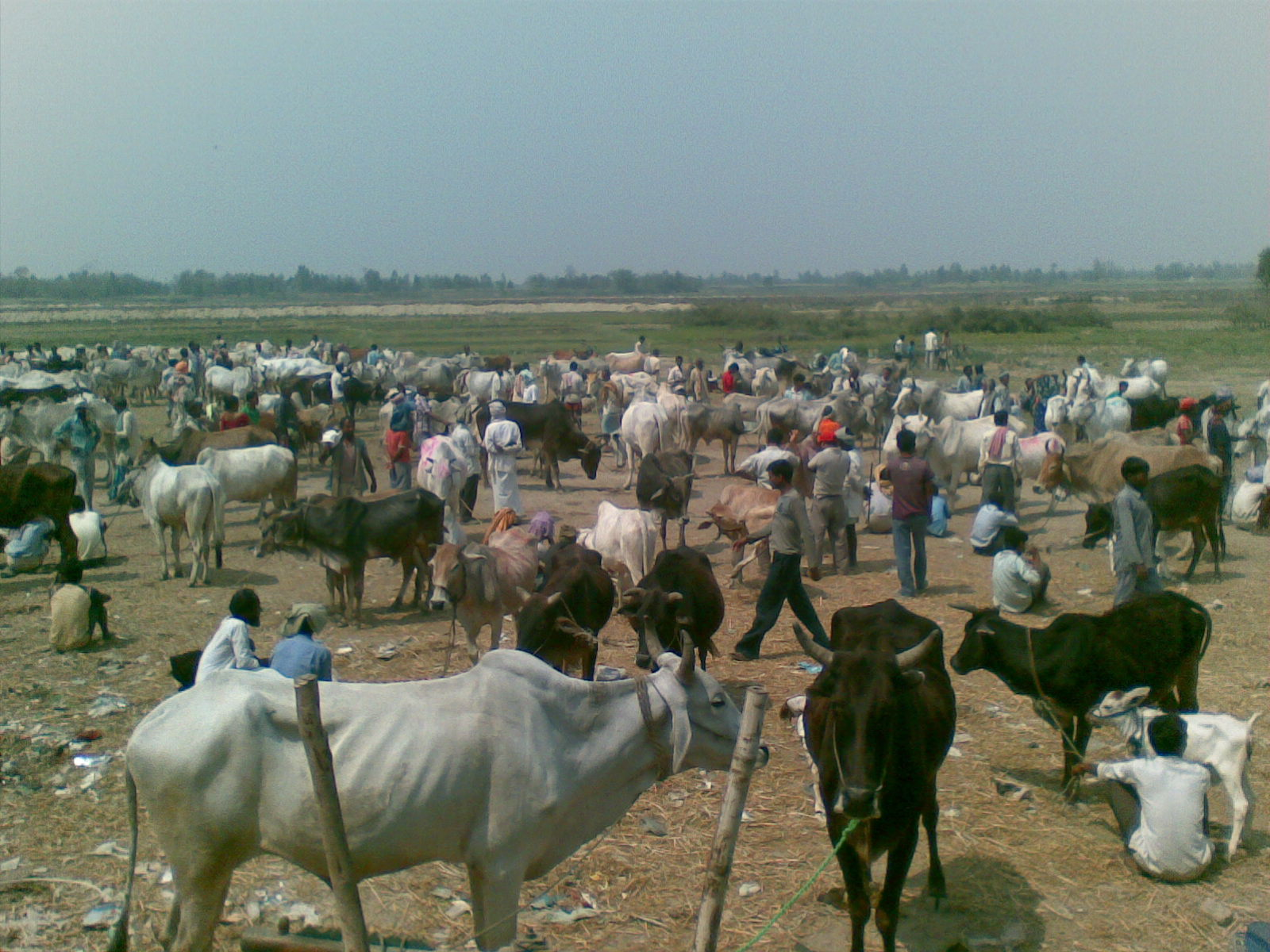
- Gai Gaushala of Gaushala Municipality, Mahottari District, Nepal

- Location in Nepal
- Coordinates: 26.92°N 85.81°E
- Country: Nepal
- Development Region: Central
- Zone: Janakpur
- District: Mahottari
- Province: Madhesh
- Established: 2014

Government
  - Mayor: Dr. Dipendra Mahato
  - Deputy Mayor: Renu Kumari

Area
  - Total: 144.73 km^{2} (55.88 sq mi)

Population (2021)
  - Total: 73,246
  - Density: 506.09/km^{2} (1,310.8/sq mi)
  - Religions: Hindu Muslim Christian

Languages
  - Local: Maithili, Nepali
- Time zone: UTC+5:45 (NST)
- Postal Code: 45700
- Area code: 044
- Website: www.gaushalamun.gov.np

Gaushala (Nepali: गौशाला ) is a municipality in Mahottari District in Madhesh Province of Nepal. The municipality was established on 18 May 2014 by merging the Nigaul, Ramnagar, and Gaushala VDCs. It occupies an area of 144.73 km^{2} with a total population around 73,000 as per the 2021 national census.

== Geography ==
Gaushala is a municipality situated in Mahottari District of Madhesh Province in southeastern Nepal. Strategically located along the East–West Highway, it serves as an important commercial and transportation hub for the surrounding rural communities. It is around 12 km from Mahendra Highway from Gaushala Chowk in the middle of Bardibas Chowk and Lalbandi Chowk near popular Maisthaan Temple. The municipality covers an area of approximately 144.73 square kilometers and has a population of around 73,000 according to the 2021 national census. Gaushala is administratively divided into 12 wards, which work together to provide local governance, public services, and community development. The municipality uses the postal code 45700 and the telephone area code 044.

The people of Gaushala represent a rich blend of cultures, traditions, and ethnic communities. The major languages spoken in the municipality are Maithili, Nepali, and Tharu, with Maithili being the most widely used in everyday communication. Festivals such as Dashain, Tihar, Chhath, Holi, and Eid are celebrated with great enthusiasm, reflecting the area's cultural and religious diversity.

Agriculture is the backbone of Gaushala's economy, employing a large proportion of the population. Farmers cultivate crops such as rice, wheat, maize, mustard, sugarcane, and various vegetables, while livestock farming—including cattle, buffalo, goats, and poultry—provides an additional source of income for many households. Local markets and small businesses also play a significant role in supporting economic activity, making Gaushala an important trading center within Mahottari District.

In recent years, Gaushala Municipality has focused on improving infrastructure, education, healthcare, drinking water supply, sanitation, and road connectivity to enhance the quality of life for its residents. The municipality continues to work toward sustainable development by promoting agriculture, expanding public services, and encouraging local economic growth while preserving its cultural heritage and natural environment.

[5]
