= Ramgopalpur =

Ramgopalpur रामगोपालपुर
- Municipality
- Location in Nepal
- Coordinates: 26.80°N 85.78°E
- Country: Nepal
- Development Region: Central
- District: Mahottari District (महोत्तरी जिल्ला)
- Province: Madhesh Province (मधेश प्रदेश)
- Established: 2016 A.D. (2073 B.S.)

Government
  - Mayor: Ram Dular Sah
  - Deputy Mayor: Rina Devi Yadav

Area
  - Total: 39.54 km^{2} (15.27 sq mi)

Population (2011)
  - Total: 29,612
  - Density: 748.9/km^{2} (1,940/sq mi)
  - Religions: Hindu Muslim Christian

Languages
  - Local: Maithili, Tharu, Nepali
- Time zone: UTC+5:45 (NST)
- Postal Code: 45700
- Area code: 044
- Website: www.ramgopalpurmun.gov.np

Ramgopalpur (Nepali: रामगोपालपुर) is a municipality in Mahottari District in Madhesh Province (मधेश प्रदेश) of Nepal. It was formed in 2016 occupying current 9 sections (wards) from previous 9 former VDCs. It occupies an area of 39.54 km^{2} with a total population of 29,612.
