= Sonama =

Sonama सोनामा गाउँपालिका
- Rural municipality
- सोनमा गाउँपालिका
- Location in Nepal
- Coordinates: 26.86°N 85.75°E
- Country: Nepal
- Province: Madhesh
- District: Mahottari

Government
  - Mayor: Bisheshwar Prashad Yadav

Area
  - Total: 57.77 km^{2} (22.31 sq mi)

Population (2021)
  - Total: 51,732
  - Density: 895.5/km^{2} (2,319/sq mi)
- Time zone: UTC+5:45 (Nepal Time)

Sonama is a rural municipality in Mahottari District in Madhesh Province of southeastern Nepal. At the time of the 1991 Nepal census it had a population of 7016 people living in 1315 individual households. Now according to 2021its population in 51732
