= Nigauli =

Coordinates: 26°55′N 85°47′E

Nigaul निगौल Gaushala 2 (Nigaul)
- Village
- Interactive map of Nigaul
- Country: Nepal
- Province: Madesh pradesh
- District: Mahottari District

Government
  - Type: Local Government

Population (2068)
  - Total: 9,055
- Time zone: UTC+5:45 (Nepal Time)
- Area code: 45700

VDC Map of Mahottari District

गौशाला नगरपालिका वडा नं. २ साविकको गौशाला गा. वि. स. वडा ९ र ११ समेतको भौगोलिक क्षेत्र जोडेर बनेको हो । यस अन्तर्गत निगौल, वीरता गाउँहरू पर्दछ । यस क्षेत्रको मुख्य बोलिने भाषा नेपाली, मैथिली, भोजपुरी हो । वडा नं. २ मा कुल १४८६ घरपरिवारको बसोबास रहेको छ । कुल जनसंख्या ९०५५ हो जस मध्ये पुरुष ४६९४, महिला ४३३९ र अन्य २२ रहेका छन् ।

Nigaul is a village which is near to Marketing business centre GAUSHALA Bazaar and market place in Gaushala Municipality in Mahottari District in the Mahottary district of Madhesh pradesh (pradesh 2) Nepal.

Gaushala is a Municipality, which is located in Mahottari district, Province No. 2 of Nepal. Gaushala has total 12 wards, which are scattered across 145 square kilometers of geographical area. According to 2011 Census conducted by Central Bureau of Statistics (CBS), Gaushala Municipality had total population of 66,673.
