= Aurahi, Mahottari =

Aurahi औरही
- Municipality
- Location in Nepal
- Coordinates: 26.89°N 85.80°E
- Country: Nepal
- Development Region: Central
- Zone: Janakpur
- District: Mahottari District
- Province: Madhesh Province
- Established: 2016 A.D. (2073 B.S.)

Government
  - Mayor: Pradeep Kumar Khadka
  - Deputy Mayor: Renu Jha

Area
  - Total: 35.73 km^{2} (13.80 sq mi)

Population (2011)
  - Total: 31,751
  - Density: 888.6/km^{2} (2,302/sq mi)
  - Religions: Hindu Muslim Christian

Languages
  - Local: Maithili, Tharu, Nepali
- Time zone: UTC+5:45 (NST)
- Postal Code: 45700
- Area code: 044
- Website: www.aurahimunmahottari.gov.np

Aurahi (Nepali: औरही ) is a municipality in Mahottari District in Madhesh Province of Nepal. It was formed in 2016 occupying current 9 sections (wards) from previous 9 former VDCs. It occupies an area of 35.73 km^{2} with a total population of 31,751.
