= Loharpatti =

Loharpatti लोहरपट्टी
- Municipality
- Location in Nepal
- Coordinates: 26.79°N 85.83°E
- Country: Nepal
- Development Region: Central
- District: Mahottari District
- Province: Province No. 2
- Established: 2016 A.D. (2073 B.S.)

Area
  - Total: 50.06 km^{2} (19.33 sq mi)

Population (2011)
  - Total: 39,571
  - Density: 790.5/km^{2} (2,047/sq mi)
  - Religions: Hindu Muslim

Languages
  - Local: Thethi, Maithili, Tharu, Nepali
- Time zone: UTC+5:45 (NST)
- Postal Code: 45700
- Area code: 044
- Website: www.loharpattimun.gov.np

Loharpatti (Nepali: लोहरपट्टी) is a municipality in Mahottari District in Province No. 2 of Nepal. It was formed in 2016 occupying nine sections (wards) from previous nine former VDCs. It occupies an area of 50.06 km^{2} with a total population of 45,773.
