= Jaleshwar =

Jaleshwar जलेश्वर
- Municipality
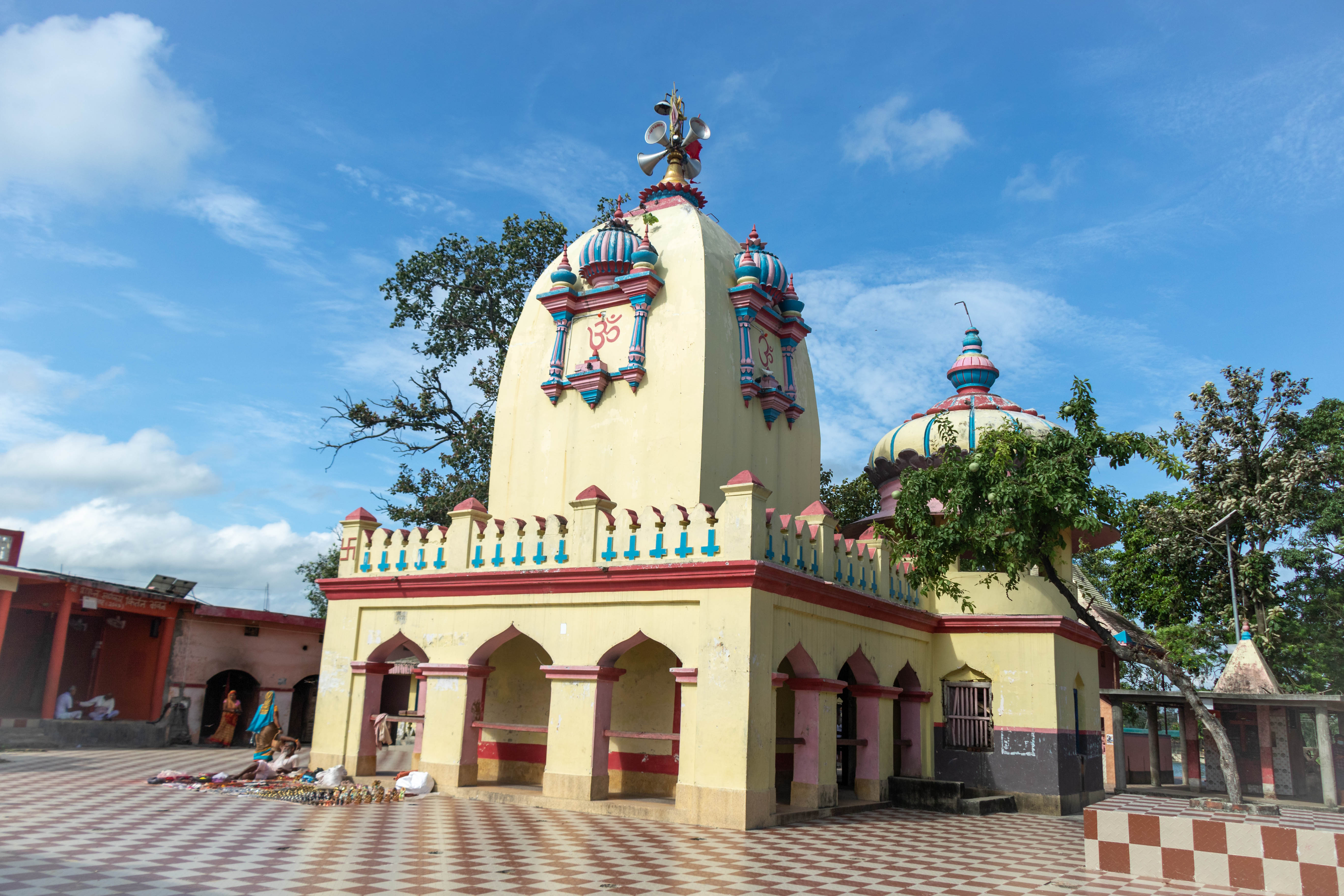
- Jaleshwar Mahadev Temple

- Location in Nepal
- Coordinates: 26°38′0″N 85°48′0″E
- Country: Nepal
- Province: Madhesh
- District: Mahottari
- No. of Wards: 12
- Established: Baisakh 15, 2039 BS (April 28, 1982 AD)

Government
  - Type: Mayor-Council
  - Mayor: Suresh Sah Sonar (JASPA)
  - Deputy Mayor: Raushan Khatun (JASPA)

Area
  - Total: 44.26 km^{2} (17.09 sq mi)
- Elevation: 53 m (174 ft)

Population
  - Total: 63,501
  - Density: 1,435/km^{2} (3,716/sq mi)
- Time zone: UTC+5:45 (NST)
- Postal code: 45700
- Area code: 044
- Website: jaleshwarmun.gov.np

Jaleshwar (Maithili: जलेश्वर) is a municipality in Janakpur Zone, Nepal, and the headquarters of Mahottari district of Madhesh Province in Nepal. It is located in the Terai, on the border with India at Bhitthamore, Bihar, and has a Customs checkpoint. The most commonly spoken language in Jaleshwar is "Maithili".

== Jaleshwarnath ==
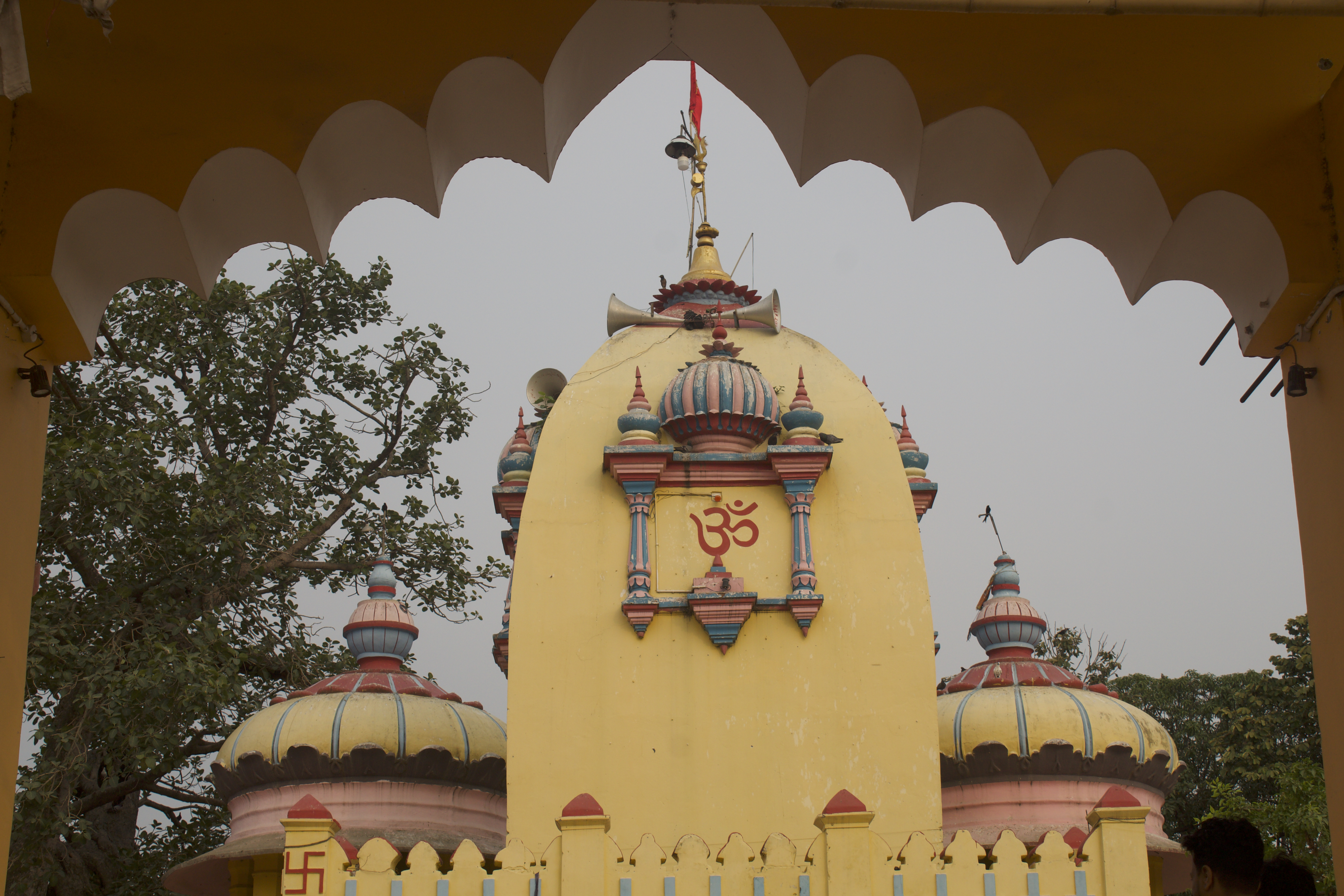
Jaleshwarnath

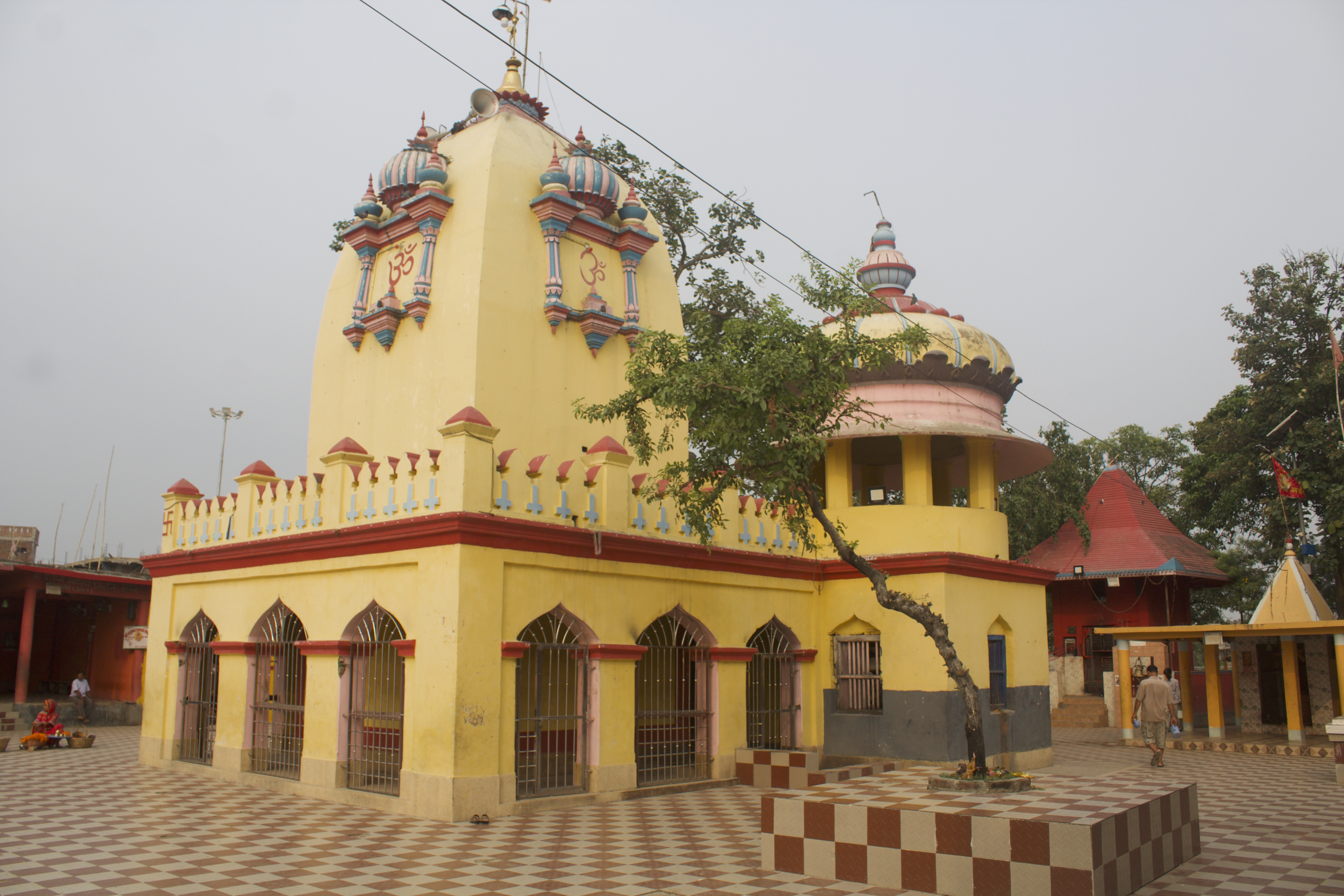
Jaleshwarnath

The municipality has the temple of Jaleshwarnath Mahadev, dedicated to Lord Shiva. Jaleshwar is the second largest business center in Mahottari District, Nepal. Given the importance of the temple, the place is named after it. It witnesses a huge gathering during Shravan [July–August] as this month is dedicated to Lord Shiva and his consort Goddess Parvati. Jaleshwornagar also is known for the goddess Sansari Mai which is situated in its centre.

== Lifestyle ==
Temperature affects the lifestyle of Jaleshwar. Due to extreme heat in summer season, people wear light cotton clothes and rarely come out during the daytime. In the winter season, the temperature may drop to 10-15°C during which people wear thick woolen clothes.

Restaurants and hotels in Jaleshwar are known for their samosas, chaat, golgappas, dahibada, momos (Nepalese-style dumplings), sekuwa (roasted spiced-meat). Samosas, chaat, katti roll, golgappas and sekuwa from Jaleshwar are considered to be the most delicious in this region. It is also known for peeda (a milk item).

The city also has religious significance. Jaleshwarnath Temple is a renowned temple for Hindu devotees in the country as well as those from nearest border cities of India.

== Geography ==
Jaleshwar is located in the Mahottari District in the south-eastern Region of Nepal (Terai region), with a total population of 23533. The climate is subtropical and the temperature varies between a maximum of 42 °C and minimum of 12 °C. People of jaleshwor wear dhoti kurta pajama and women wear Saree blouse. Due to the Indian border, there are many people attract in western culture.

== Transportation ==
Jaleshwar is located 15 km south of Janakpur. Jaleshwar has fully operational bus and mini-bus services that reach almost all parts of this region that connected by roadways, almost including all the major hubs in the country. The main hub for buses is Jaleshwar Buspark, while small transits are located in several other places in the city like Buddhajibi chok, maccha bazar. Short routes are generally covered by e-rickshaw and mini-bus, while luxury coaches are available for long routes to destinations like Kathmandu, Birgunj, etc. The country's longest highway – Mahendra Highway – is linked from the city center.

Indian and Nepalese nationals may cross the border without restrictions; however, there is a customs checkpoint for goods and third-country nationals.

The most common public transport for commuters within the city have long been cycle rickshaws and electric rickshaws. Most common private transport are motorcycles, especially among young adults, while bicycles are used by many. Recently the number of automobiles has increased.

== Trade ==
Jaleshwar is among the fastest growing trade centres of Nepal. There are some small and medium scale industries. As it is situated near the border of India, the main trade of this place is with Indian market. The Nepalese Government has planned to make this place as business hub of Nepal.
