= Mahottari District =

District in Madhesh Province, Nepal

Coordinates: 26°38′0″N 85°48′0″E

Mahottari District महोत्तरी जिल्ला
- District
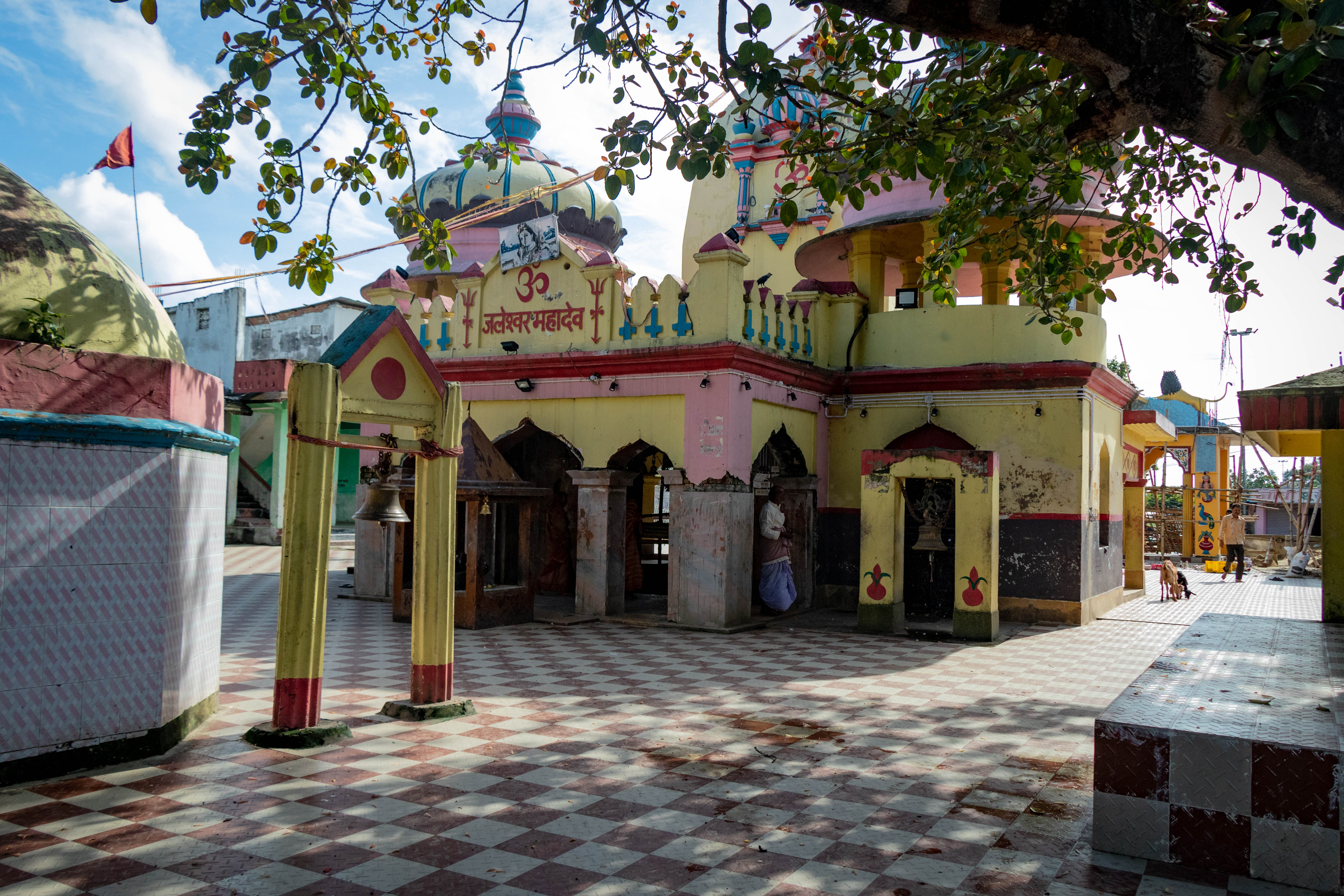
- Jaleshwar Mahadev Temple, a major Shiva temple in Mahottari

- Mahottari District (dark yellow), in Madhesh Province
- Country: Nepal
- Region: Madhesh Province
- Province: Madhesh Province
- Admin HQ.: Jaleshwar

Government
  - Type: Coordination committee
  - Body: DCC, Mahottari

Area
  - Total: 1,002 km^{2} (387 sq mi)

Population (2021)
  - Total: 705,838
  - Density: 704.4/km^{2} (1,824/sq mi)
- Time zone: UTC+05:45 (NPT)
- Telephone Code: 044
- Main Language(s): Maithili (88.0%), Nepali (5.6%), other (6.4%)
- Website: ddcmahottari.gov.np

Mahottari District (Maithili: महोत्तरी जिल्ला,), a part of Madhesh Province, is one of the seventy-seven districts of Nepal. The district, with Jaleshwar as its district headquarters, covers an area of 1,002 km^{2} (387 sq mi) and had a population of 553,481 in 2001, 627,580 in 2011 and 705,838 in 2021 census. Its headquarters is located in Jaleshwar, a neighbouring town of the historical city of Janakpur. The name Jaleshwar means 'God in Water'. One can find a famous temple of Lord Shiva in Water there. Jaleshwar lies at a few kilometres distance from the Nepal-India border and has a majority Maithili population.

== Geography and climate ==
Climate Zone	Elevation Range	% of Area
Lower Tropical	below 300 meters (1,000 ft)	85.0%
Upper Tropical	300 to 1,000 meters 1,000 to 3,300 ft.	15.0%

== Demographics ==
Historical population
Census year	Pop.	±% p.a.
1981	361,054	—
1991	440,146	+2.00%
2001	553,481	+2.32%
2011	627,580	+1.26%
2021	715,040	+1.31%
Source: Citypopulation

At the time of the 2021 Nepal census, Mahottari District had a population of 706,994. 10.65% of the population is under 5 years of age. It has a literacy rate of 59.77% and a sex ratio of 1025 females per 1000 males. 523,133 (73.99%) lived in municipalities.

Ethnic groups/castes in Mahottari district (2021)
1. Yadav (15.7%)
2. Muslim (15.2%)
3. Dhanuk (6.40%)
4. Kushwaha (5.71%)
5. Teli (4.24%)
6. Musahar (3.87%)
7. Chamar (3.57%)
8. Khatwe (2.78%)
9. Paswan (2.49%)
10. Bhumihar (2.45%)
11. Sundhi (2.29%)
12. Noniya (2.24%)
13. Terai Brahmin (2.12%)
14. Magar (2.09%)
15. Other Madheshi non-Dalit (16.9%)
16. Other Madheshi Dalit (3.17%)
17. Khas non-Dalit (2.87%)
18. Other Hill Janjati (2.36%)
19. Khas Dalit (1.00%)
20. Others (2.62%)

The Madheshis are the largest group. Yadavs are the largest caste. Muslims are the second largest community.

Religion in Mahottari District (2021)
Religion	Percent
Hinduism	82.68%
Islam	15.55%
Buddhism	1.55%
Other or not stated	0.22%

Religion: 84.2% were Hindu, 13.3% Muslim, 2.0% Buddhist, 0.1% Christian and 0.2% others.

Languages of Mahottari district (2021)
1. Maithili (70.9%)
2. Magahi (11.0%)
3. Urdu (6.25%)
4. Nepali (5.56%)
5. Bajjika (1.76%)
6. Magar (1.76%)
7. Tamang (1.01%)
8. Tharu (0.90%)
9. Others (0.89%)

Maithili is the largest language. Nepali is the second-largest language. Urdu and Tharu are spoken by a small minority.

== Notable people ==
List ordered alphabetically

- Abhiram Sharma-Loktantrik Samajwadi Party, Nepal member of Madhesh Provincial Assembly.
- Bhadrakali Mishra- Nepali Congress leader of Minister of Nepal at various times
- Giriraj Mani Pokharel-CPN (Maoist Centre) leader and former Minister for Education
- Hari Shankar Mishra- Current governor of Madhesh Province, former Nepali Congress leader and Member of House of Representatives
- Krishna Hari Pushkar - former secretary of the Government of Nepal
- Mahantha Thakur- Chairman of Democratic Socialist Party and former Minister for various ministries as NC leader
- Mahendra Kumar Raya- Nepali Congress leader and former Minister of state for Industry, Commerce and Supplies under Bimalendra Nidhi
- Maheshwar Prasad Singh- democracy icon and Nepali Congress leader
- Ram Narayan Mishra- Nepali Congress leader and minister in first democratically elected government of BP Koirala
- Sharat Singh Bhandari- former NC leader and senior leader of DSP, N. Also former Minister for Defence
- Shivajee Yadav-Deputy chairman of People's Progressive Party and former member of constituent assembly

== Administration ==
The district consists of ten urban municipalities and five rural municipalities. These are as follows:

- Aurahi Municipality
- Balawa Municipality
- Bardibas Municipality
- Bhangaha Municipality
- Gaushala Municipality
- Jaleshwor Municipality
- Loharpatti Municipality
- ManaraShiswa Municipality
- Matihani Municipality
- Ramgopalpur Municipality
- Ekdara Rural Municipality
- Mahottari Rural Municipality
- Pipara Rural Municipality
- Samsi Rural Municipality
- Sonama Rural Municipality

=== Former Village Development Committees (VDCs) and Municipalities ===
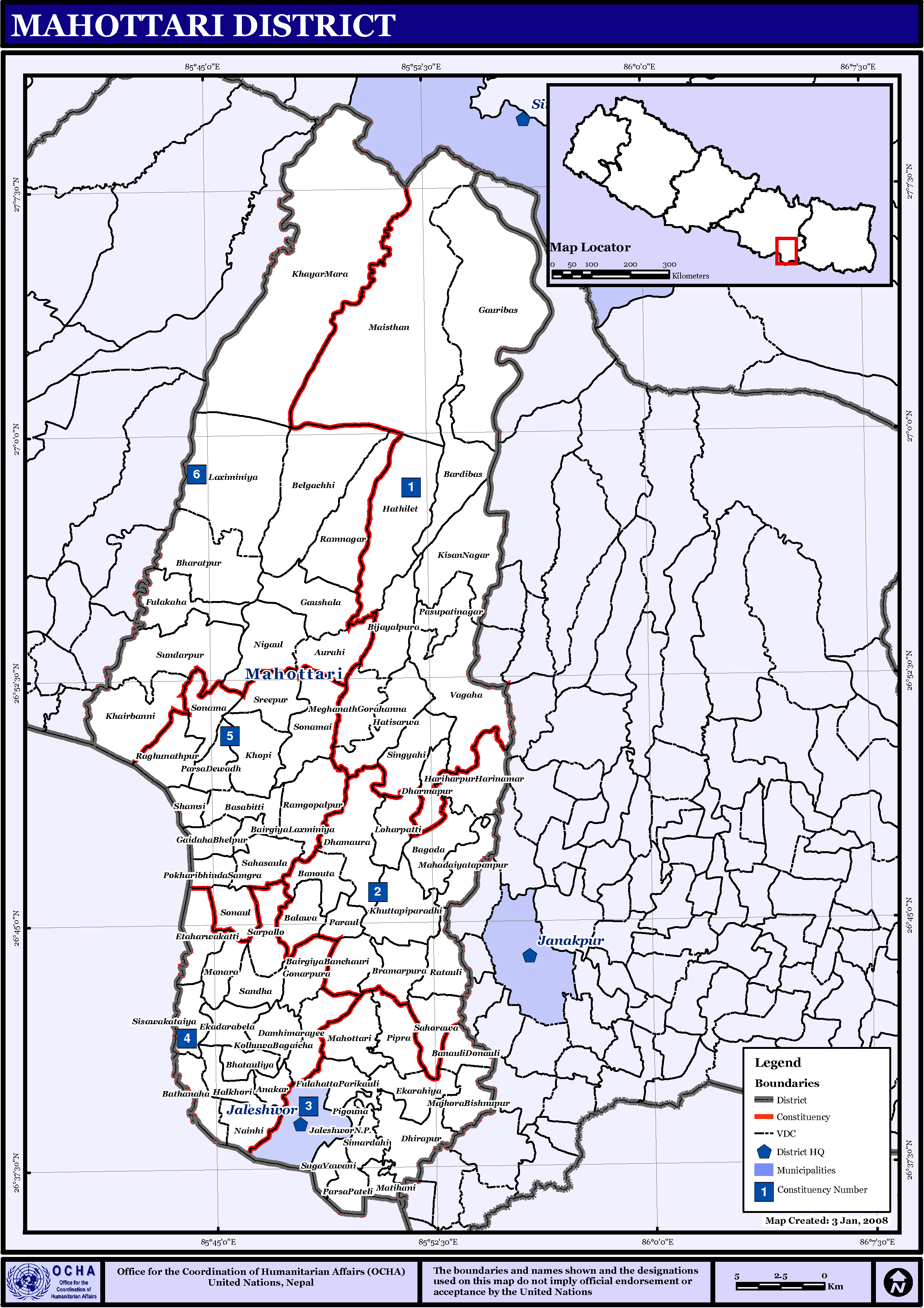
VDCs and Municipalities in Mahottari District

The 2011 National Population and Housing Census by the government of Nepal identifies 77 municipalities and village development committees (VDC) within the Mahottari District.

- Anakar
- Aurahi
- Bagada
- Banchauri
- Badiya
- Bairgiya Laksminiya
- Balawa
- Banauli Donauli
- Banauta
- Bardibas Municipality
- Basabitti
- Bathnaha
- Belgachhi
- Bhangaha
- Bharatpur
- Bhatauliya
- Bijayalpura
- Bhramarpura
- Damhi Marai
- Dhamaura
- Dharmapur
- Dhirapur
- Ekadarabela
- Ekarahiya
- Etaharwakatti
- Gaidha Bhetpur
- Gauribas
- Gaushala Municipality
- Gonarpura
- Halkhori
- Hariharpur Harinmari
- Hathilet
- Hatisarwa
- Jaleshwar Municipality
- Khairbanni
- Khaya Mara
- Khopi
- Khuttapipradhi
- Kisan Nagar
- Kolhusa Bagaiya
- Laksminiya
- Loharpatti
- Mahadaiyatapanpur
- Mahottari
- Maisthan
- Majhaura Vishnupur
- Manara
- Matihani
- Meghanath Gorhanna
- Nainhi
- Nigaul
- Padaul
- Parsa Pateli
- Parsadewadh
- Pashupatinagar
- Phulahatta Parikauli
- Phulakaha
- Pigauna
- Pipra
- Pokharibhinda Samgrampur
- Raghunathpur
- Ramgopalpur
- Ramnagar
- Ratauli
- Ratauli 9 Rahmanpur
- Sahasaula
- Sahorawa
- Samdha
- Sarpallo
- Shamsi
- Sripur
- Simardahi
- Singyahi
- Sisawakataiya
- Sonama
- sonamai bhoil
- Sonaum
- Suga Bhawani
- Sundarpur
- Mangalnath, Magarthana

== See also ==
- Gaushala Engineering Campus
