= Janakpur Zone =

Coordinates: 27°10′N 85°55′E

Janakpur Zone जनकपुर अञ्चल
- Former Zone
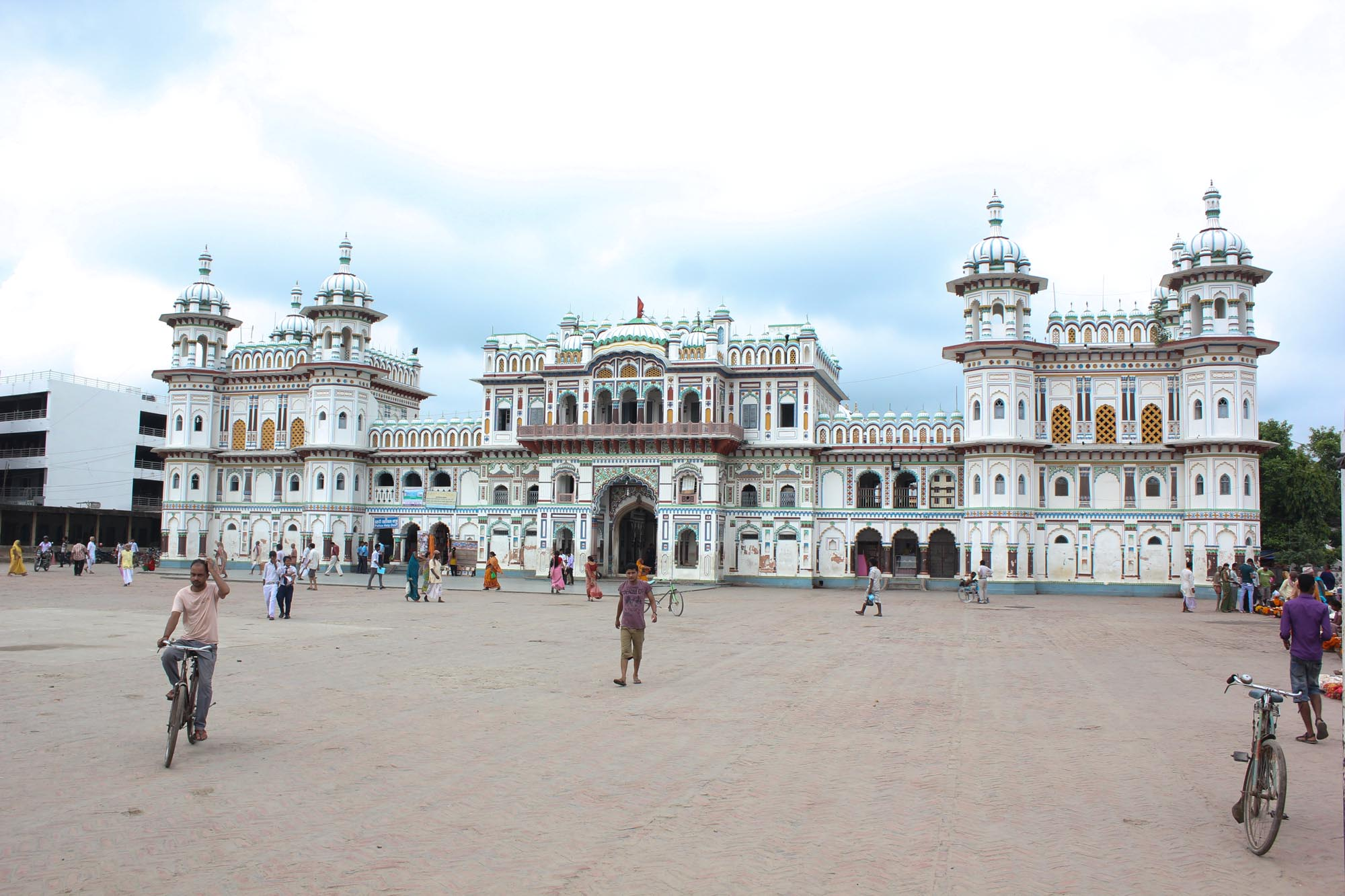

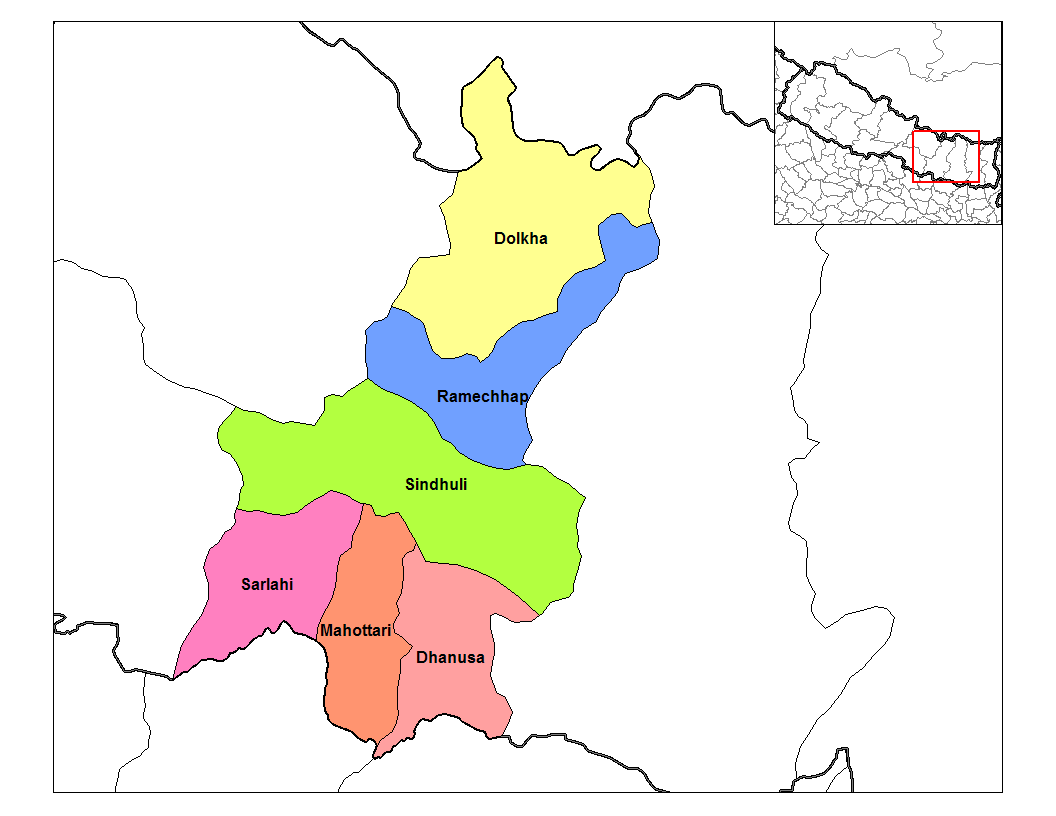
- Country: Nepal
- Region: Central Development Region

Area
  - Total: 9,669 km^{2} (3,733 sq mi)

Population (2001)
  - Total: 2,557,004
  - Density: 264.5/km^{2} (685/sq mi)
- Time zone: UTC+5:45 (Nepal Time)

Janakpur Zone (Nepali: जनकपुर अञ्चल) was one of the fourteen zones of Nepal, reaching from the Indian border in the south to the Tibetan border in the north and Sagarmatha Zone in the east and Bagmati and Naryani Zones in the west.

The headquarters of Janakpur Zone and its main city was Janakpur. Close to the Indian border, it is a historic city of Hinduism. The city is believed to have been the capital city of King Janaka, the father-in-law of Lord Rama, the son of the then king of Ayodhya, Dasharatha. The city was then called 'Mithila Nagari'. The name of Janakpur zone is related to the historic King Janaka and his capital Janakpur.

Other cities within Janakpur Zone are Kamalamai (in Inner Terai), Manthali (in Hill), Bhimeshwor (in Himalaya) and Bardibas, Dhalkebar, Jaleshwor, Malangwa, Hariwan, Lalbandi, Gaushala Bazar and Matihani (Outer Terai).

== Administrative subdivisions ==
As a zone, Janakpur was divided into six districts; since 2015 the three northern districts have been redesignated as part of Bagmati Province, while the three southern districts have been redesignated as part of Madhesh Province.

District	Type	Headquarters	Since 2015 part of Province
Dhanusha	Outer Terai	Janakpur	Madhesh Province
Mahottari	Outer Terai	Jaleshwar	Madhesh Province
Sarlahi	Outer Terai	Malangwa	Madhesh Province
Dolakha	Mountain	Charikot	Bagmati Province
Ramechhap	Hill	Manthali	Bagmati Province
Sindhuli	Inner Terai	Sindhulimadhi	Bagmati Province

== See also ==
- Development Regions of Nepal (Former)
- List of zones of Nepal (Former)
- List of districts of Nepal
