= Municipalities of Nepal =

Type of local-level administrative subdivision of Nepal

Municipality
- Category: Third-level administrative division
- Location: Districts of Nepal
- Found in: Districts
- Number: 753 (as of 2017)
- Government: Local executive

A municipality (Nepali: नगरपालिका) in Nepal is an administrative division in the Provinces of Nepal. The urban population of Nepal refers to the inhabitants residing in the designated municipal area. Population size has been taken as the principal criteria in the declaration of urban areas in Nepal since 1961. Municipalities can therefore also include rural areas. It functions as a sub-unit of a district. Nepal currently has 293 municipalities, which given the 2011 population estimate of 16,656,057.

The municipalities are categorised into three categories: Metropolitan municipality (500,000+ population), Sub-metropolitan municipality (200,000+ population) and Municipality (10,000+ population). There are 6 metropolitan municipality, 11 sub-metropolitan municipality and 276 municipality.

== History ==
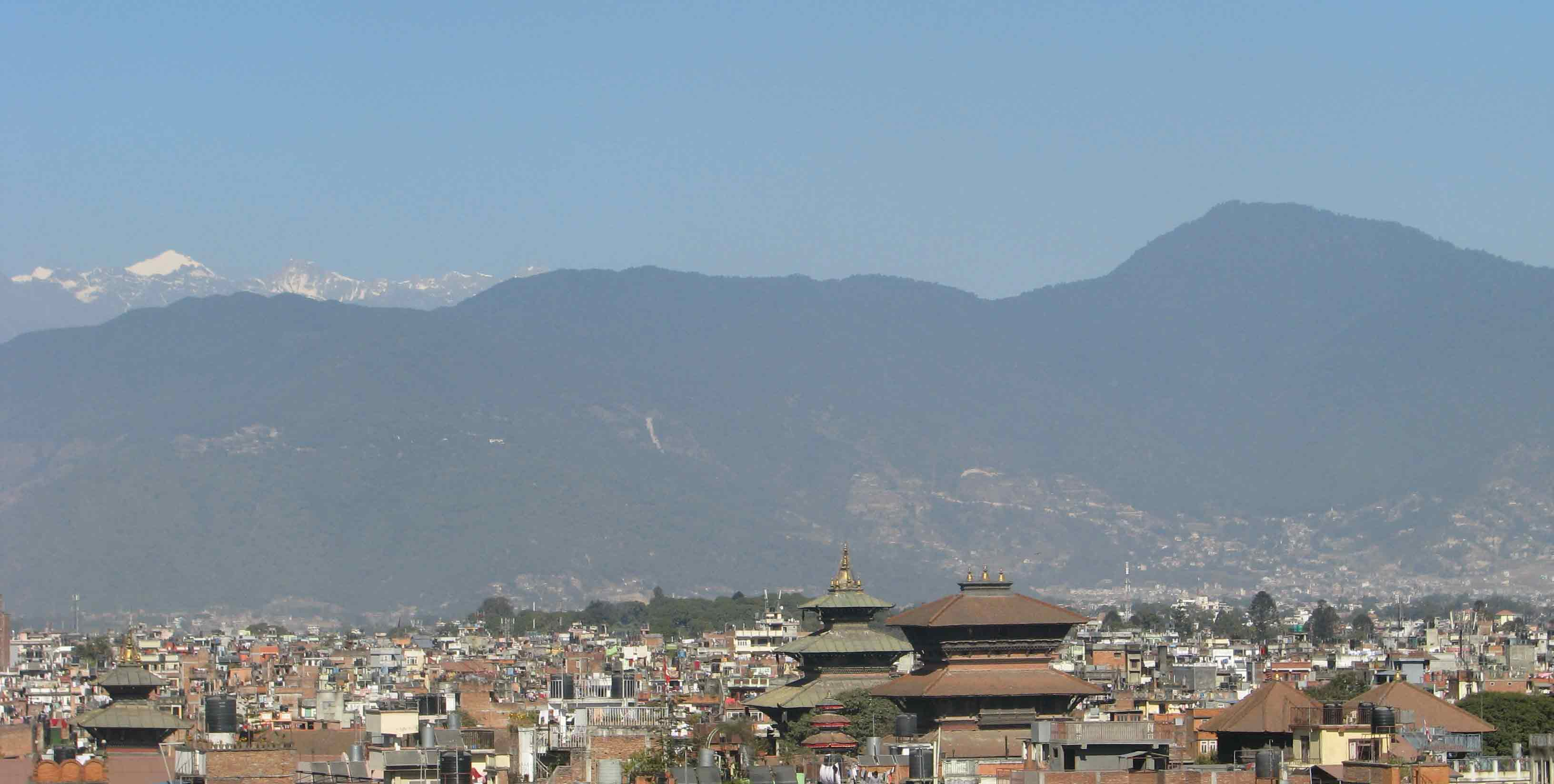
Kathmandu

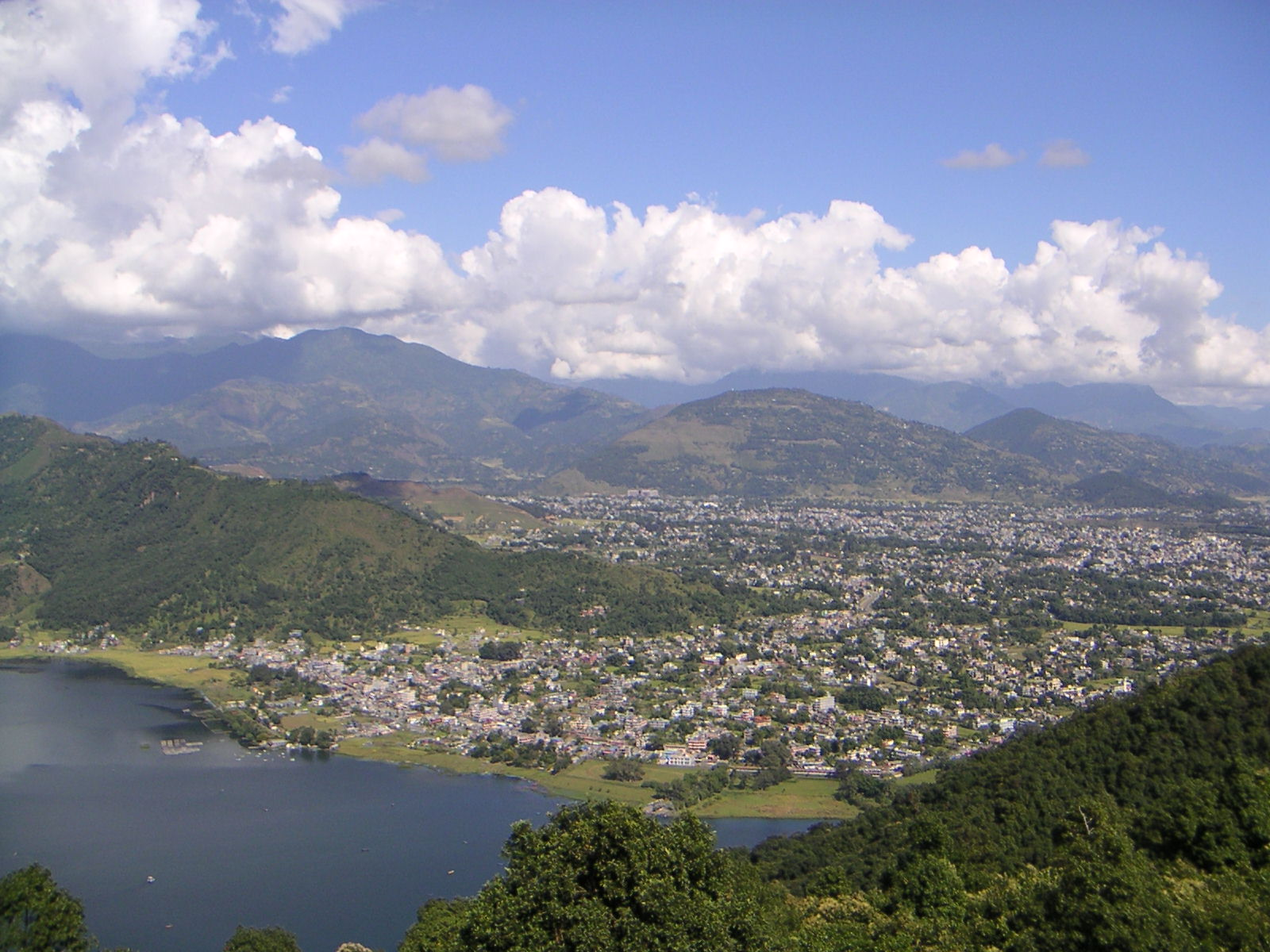
Pokhara

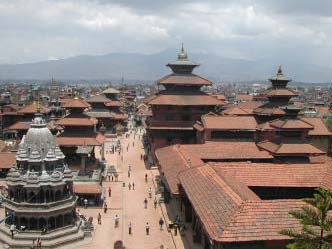
Lalitpur

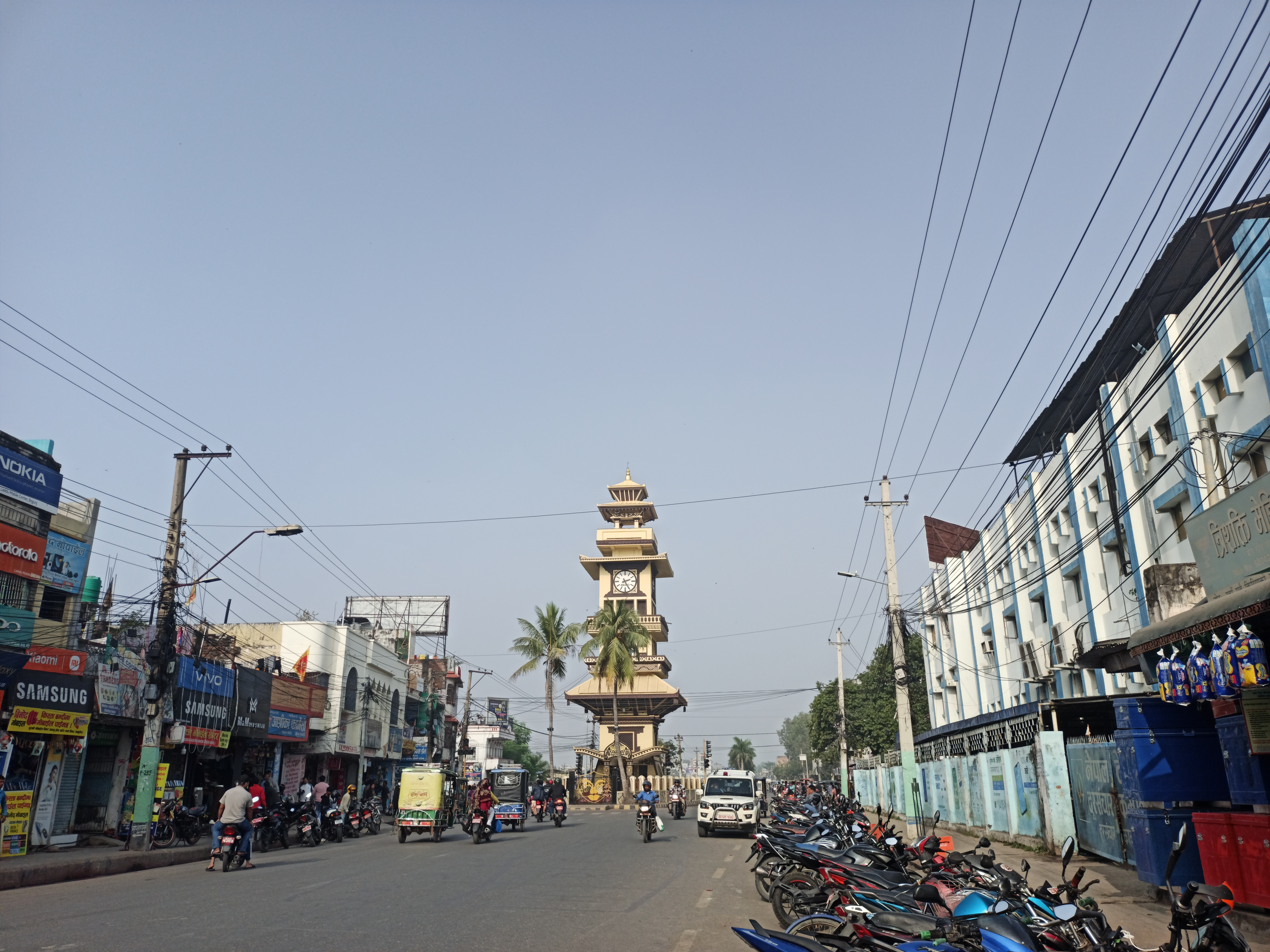
Birgunj

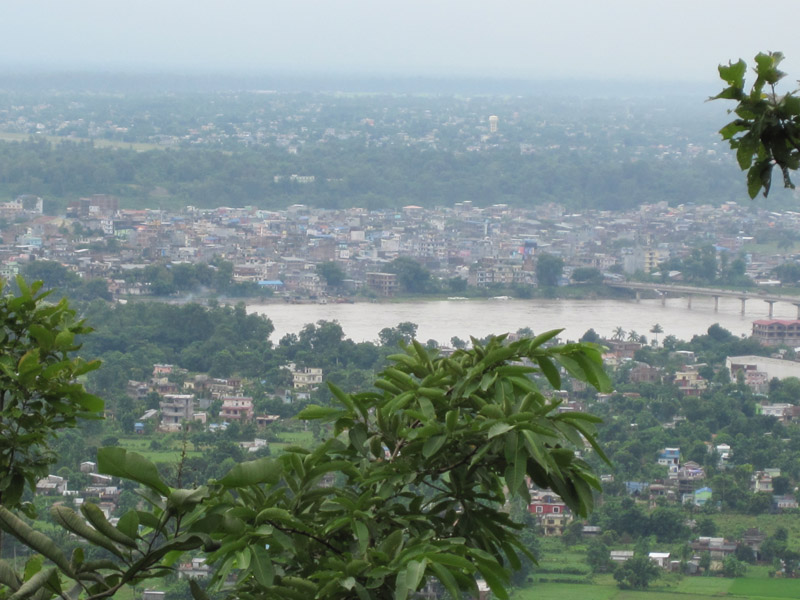
Bharatpur

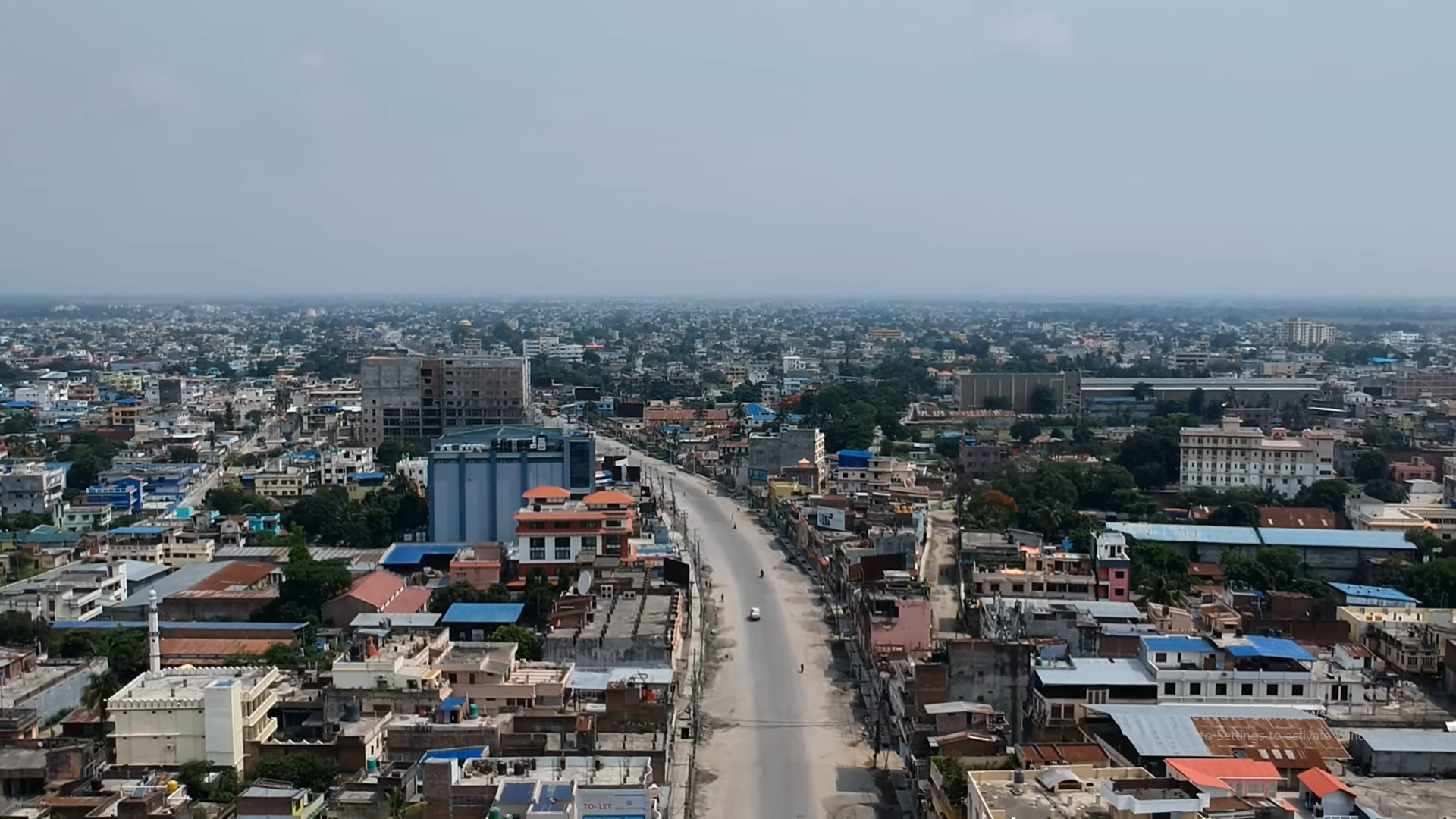
Biratnagar

The first urban center in Nepal took place in Kathmandu Valley. The historical evidences on the existence of towns in the Kathmandu Valley are found during Licchavi period. At the same time, three major towns with urban characteristics had been developed in the Kathmandu Valley. During the Rana period, towns in the hills were also as hill stations for the purpose of administration and as an outpost against invaders. Towns like Dhankuta in East Nepal, Palpa in Central Nepal and Doti in West Nepal were initially developed as cantonments. Urban areas in the Terai developed because of trade between Nepal and British India. The British had laid railway lines at the border of Nepal for the purpose of trade which gradually increased urban centers in the Terai. Although urban areas developed during Rana period or before it were not officially recorded. Kathmandu was given the status of municipality in 1930 but was only gazetted in 1953. Dharan was established in 1958 as a fourth municipality of the country

== Structure and responsibilities ==
As defined by Part 17 of the Constitution of Nepal, the municipalities are governed by a Municipal Executive headed by a mayor. The Municipal Executive consists of the deputy mayor, ward chairpersons elected from each ward in the municipality, and five women members elected by the Municipal Assembly among themselves and three members from the Dalit or other minority communities. Part 18 of the Constitution of Nepal states that the Municipal Assembly hold all legislative powers of the municipality. It consists of the mayor, deputy mayor, ward chairpersons and four ward members elected from each of the wards in the municipality out of which at least two must be a woman. All members of the Dalit or minority communities that was elected to the Municipal Executive must be the members of the Municipal Assembly of the municipality for representing those communities. Part 17 also includes provisions for a Judicial Committee which is headed by the deputy mayor and consists of two other members elected by the Municipal Assembly among themselves. Schedule 8 and Schedule 9 of the constitution deals with powers that the local executive can execute either on its own or concurrently with the federal and the provincial governments.

== Classification ==
=== Metropolitan Municipality ===
According to the Local Government Operation Act 2017 a metropolitan municipality must have following criteria to get the status of Metropolitan Municipality:

- Population: 500,000+
- Annual Income (in NPR): 1,00,00,00,000+
- Infrastructures: Educational institute up to the higher level, medical services, hospitals, transportation facilities, metalled road, communication services, Museum, stadium, assembly hall and exhibition area of international standard. Sufficient recreation places for children and elderly people, Basic water supply and sanitation services. Garbage treatment and management system, Shopping mall, vegetable and fruit market, hotels of international standards. Urban greenery and scenic beauty, etc. as prescribed by government.

=== Sub-metropolitan Municipality ===
A sub-metropolitan municipality must have to fulfill following criteria:

- Population: 200,000+
- Annual Income (in NPR): 250,000,000+
- Infrastructures: higher-level education, medical services, hospitals, transportation facilities, metalled road, basic communication services, Public garden, assembly hall, stadium, gym hall and covered hall of national standard, Basic water supply and sanitation services. Garbage treatment and management system, Market place, animal slaughter houses, human corpses disposal place. Hotel, motel and resorts of tourism standards. Disable friendly and physically accessible infrastructures.

=== Municipality ===
A municipality must have to fulfill following criteria:

- Population: 10,000+ in mountainous areas of Mountainous districts, 40,000+ in hilly areas of Mountainous and Hilly districts, 50,000+ in Inner Terai districts, 75,000+ in Terai Districts and 100,000+ in districts of Kathmandu Valley.
- Annual Income (in NPR): 10,000,000+ in mountainous areas and 30,000,000+ in other areas.
- Infrastructures: road, electricity, drinking water, communication services and other minimum city facilities.

== List of Municipalities by the date of establishment ==
=== 1953 to 1997 ===
There were 58 traditional municipalities which were established from 1953 to 1997. (Below given population are prior to reconstruction in 2017. In 2017, more area and population added to given municipality.)

- Year	Municipality	Population (2011)
  1953	Kathmandu	975,453
  1953	Bhaktapur	81,748
  1953	Lalitpur	220,802
  1953	Birgunj	135,904
  1953	Biratnagar	201,125
  1953	Bhadrapur	18,164
  1957	Tansen	29,095
  1959	Rajbiraj	37,738
  1959	Butwal	118,462
  1958	Dharan	133,082
  1962	Ilam	18,633
  1962	Janakpur	97,776
  1962	Nepalganj	72,503
  1962	Pokhara	255,465
  1967	Siddharthanagar	63,483
  1969	Hetauda	135,745
  1976	Birendranagar	85,138
  1976	Dhangadhi	101,970
  1976	Lahan	33,653
  1977	Bheemdatta	104,599
  1978	Bharatpur	143,836
  1978	Dhankuta	26,440
  1978	Ghorahi	62,928
  1982	Banepa	24,764
  1982	Damak	75,102
  1982	Jaleshwar	23,533
  1982	Kalaiya	42,826
  1982	Dipayal Silgadhi	23,416
  1982	Kapilvastu* (renamed as Taulihawa)	30,428
- Year	Municipality	Population (2011)
  1986	Bidur	26,750
  1986	Dhulikhel	14,283
  1986	Inaruwa	28,454
  1986	Malangwa	25,102
  1992	Gaur	34,937
  1992	Tulsipur	51,537
  1992	Vyas	42,899
  1997	Amargadhi	21,245
  1997	Baglung	29,360
  1997	Bhimeshwar	22,537
  1997	Dasharathchand	16,791
  1997	Gorkha (Prithvinarayan)	32,473
  1997	Gulariya	55,747
  1997	Itahari	74,501
  1997	Kamalamai	39,413
  1997	Khandbari	26,301
  1997	Kirtipur	65,602
  1997	Lekhnath* (merged with Pokhara later)	58,816
  1997	Madhyapur Thimi	83,036
  1997	Mechinagar	57,545
  1997	Narayan	21,110
  1997	Panauti	27,358
  1997	Putalibazar	30,704
  1997	Ramgram	25,990
  1997	Ratnanagar	46,367
  1997	Siraha	28,442
  1997	Tikapur	56,127
  1997	Triyuga	70,000
  1997	Waling	24,006

=== 2014 ===
Total 133 municipalities were established in 2014 in two segments but on 10 March 2017 reconstructed local level body and brought changing in some of municipalities. Some municipality completely disestablished (declined)

- 72 municipalities were established on 18 May 2014
1. Taplejung (renamed as Phungling)
2. Phidim
3. Urlabari
4. Myanglung
5. Bhojpur
6. Diktel (renamed as Rupakot Majhuwagadhi)
7. Katari
8. Sambhunath
9. Kanchanrup
10. Mirchaiya
11. Suryodaya
12. Shaniarjun (renamed as Arjundhara)
13. Kankai
14. Chainpur
15. Belbari
16. Pathari Shanishchare
17. Sundar Dulari No Declined
18. Koshi Haraichha No Declined
19. Rangeli
20. Duhabi Bhaluwa ("Bhaluwa" removed later)
21. Siddhicharan
22. Beltar Basaha (renamed as Chaudandigadhi
23. Birtamod
24. Hariwan
25. Chandrapur
26. Gadhimai No Declined
27. Chautara (Chautara Sangachokgadhi)
28. Panchkhal
29. Nilkantha
30. Dhanushadham
31. Chhireshwarnath
32. Gaushala
33. Lalbandi
34. Ishwarpur
35. Thaha
36. Nijgadh
37. Khairahani
38. Chitrawan No Declined
39. Shuklagandaki
40. Bandipur
41. Kushma
42. Resunga
43. Sandhikharka
44. Sunwal
45. Besisahar
46. Gaindakot
47. Chapakot
48. Rampur
49. Kawasoti
50. Devachuli
51. Bardaghat
52. Sainamaina
53. Beni
54. Lumbini Sanskritik
55. Dev Daha
56. Tilottama
57. Krishnanagar
58. Shivaraj
59. Kohalpur
60. Shaarada
61. Mangalsen
62. Sanfebagar
63. Rajapur
64. Pyuthan
65. Dullu
66. Chandan Nath
67. Jayaprithvi
68. Lamkichuha
69. Attariya (renamed as Godawari)
70. Api (renamed as Mahakali)
71. Punarbas
72. Belauri
- 61 new Municipalities were established on 2 December 2014.
1. Gokarneshwor
2. Dakshinkali
3. Tarakeshwor
4. Shankharapur
5. Chandragiri
6. Kageshwori
7. Tokha
8. Nagarjun
9. Budhanilkantha
10. Anantalineshowr No Declined
11. Karyabinayak No Declined
12. Godawari
13. Changunarayan
14. Maha Manjushree Nagarkot No Declined
15. Patan
16. Deumai
17. Shivasatakshi
18. Letang (renamed as Letang)
19. Ramdhuni-Bhasi
20. Pakhribas
21. Shadanand
22. Madi
23. Saptakoshi
24. Golbazar
25. Dudhkunda (renamed as Solududhkunda)
26. Badimalika
27. Bhajani Trishakti (renamed as Bhajani)
28. Parshuram
29. Bardibas
30. Garuda
31. Pokhariya
32. Dapcha Kashikhanda (renamed as Namobuddha)
33. Melamchi
34. Sundarbazar
35. Bheriganga
36. Musikot
37. Palungtar
38. Jiri
39. Manthali
40. Dudhauli
41. Ghodaghodi
42. Mahagadhimai
43. Simraungadh
44. Buddhabatika No Declined
45. Ganeshman Charanath
46. Mithila
47. Sabaila
48. Basgadhi
49. Madi
50. Narayani No Declined
51. Lamahi
52. Tripur No Declined
53. Dodhara Chandani
54. Jhalari Pipladi (renamed Shuklaphanta)
55. Ramechhap
56. Kolhabi
57. Mahalaxmi
58. Libang (renamed as Rolpa)
59. Suryabinayak
60. Banganga
61. Sanoshree Taratal (renamed as Madhuwan later)

=== 2015 ===
Total 26 municipalities were established on 19 September 2015. Reconstructed on 10 March 2017 with some changing in existed municipalities.

1. Gauradaha
2. Laligurans
3. Hanumannagar Yoginimai No Declined
4. Sukhipur
5. Dhangadhimai
6. Bajrabarahi
7. Kalika
8. Rapti
9. Barahathwa
10. Bhanu
11. Anbu Khaireni
12. Madhyabindu
13. Bhrikuti No Declined
14. Bhirkot
15. Rainas
16. Karaputar No Declined
17. Bherimalika
18. Chaurjahari
19. Bagchaur
20. Subhaghat Gangamala (renamed as Gurbhakot)
21. Kamalbazar
22. Beldandi
23. Bedkot
24. Krishnapur
25. Babai No Declined
26. kalikadevi

=== 2017 ===
On 10 March 2017 Government of Nepal reconstructed old local level bodies into 744 new local level units as per the new constitution of Nepal 2015. Later, on recommendance of Supreme court 9 more local level body added to Province No. 2, increasing from 744 to 753.

1. Mai
2. Ratuwamai
3. Sunawarshi
4. Barahkshetra
5. Mahalaxmi
6. Dharmadevi
7. Panchkhapan
8. Halesi Tuwachung
9. Belaka
10. Dakneshwari
11. Bodebarsain
12. Khadak
13. Surunga
14. Kalyanpur
15. Nagarain
16. Bideha
17. Haripur
18. Haripurwa
19. Balara
20. Godaita
21. Bagmati
22. Bahrabise
23. Belkotgadhi
24. Dhunibeshi
25. Bhimad
26. Galyang
27. Phalewas
28. Galkot
29. Jaimini
30. Dhorpatan
31. Musikot
32. Buddhabhumi
33. Maharajganj
34. Sitganga
35. Bhumikasthan
36. Swargadwari
37. Aathbiskot
38. Bangad Kupinde
39. Barbardiya
40. Panchpuri
41. Lekbesi
42. Chamunda Bindrasaini
43. Aathbis
44. Chhedagad
45. Nalgad
46. Thuli Bheri
47. Tripurasundari
48. Khandachakra
49. Raskot
50. Tilagufa
51. Chhayanath Rara
52. Tribeni
53. Budhiganga
54. Budhinanda
55. Bungal
56. Panchadewal Binayak
57. Shikhar
58. Gauriganga
59. Melauli
60. Purchaudi
61. Shailyashikhar
62. Karjanha
63. Mithila Bihari
64. Sahidnagar
65. Kamala
66. Hansapur
67. Aurahi
68. Balawa
69. Bhangaha
70. Loharpatti
71. Manara Shiswa
72. Matihani
73. Ramgopalpur
74. Kabilasi
75. Madhav Narayan
76. Katahariya
77. Gujara
78. Dewahi Gonahi
79. Brindaban
80. Baudhimai
81. Pacharauta
82. Parsagadhi
83. Bahudarmai
84. Ishnath
85. Maulapur
86. Paroha
87. Phatuwa Bijayapur
88. Rajdevi
89. Rajpur
90. Jeetpursimara
91. Hanumannagar Kankalini
92. Madhyanepal
93. Thakurbaba
94. Sundar Haraicha

== See also ==
- List of cities in Nepal
- List of rural municipalities of Nepal
- List of cities in Nepal by population
