= Badaharwa village =

Badaharwa बडहरवा
- Village development committee
- Location in Nepal
- Coordinates: 26.81°N 85.32°E
- Country: Nepal
- Zone: Narayani Zone
- District: Rautahat District

Population (2011)
  - Total: 4,949
- Time zone: UTC+5:45 (Nepal Time)

Badaharwa (also: Badharwa)(Nepali: बडहर्वा) is a small village situated in Rautahat District in the Narayani Zone of southern Nepal.

== Geography ==
The village is separated by the Bagmati River in two parts:east side and west side. The majority of the portion of village being in eastern side based on population and western side based on area. Although Rautahat District is separated from the Sarlahi District by Bagmati River in most of its parts, the exceptions are Badaharwa, Dharampur and Sedhwa village. Basically it faces Sarlahi District in east, Matsari village in north, Saruatha and Jhunkhunma village in west and Basatpur village in south.

== Demographics ==
According to normal population and housing census 2011, the total population of this village is 4949. Male population is 2616 and female population is 2333. The total number of households is 802.

== Economy ==
The major occupation of people in this village is farming, government services, constructional works, factory works either in indian cities like Ludhiana, Mumbai, Delhi, et cetera or in Arab countries like UAE, Malaysia, Saudi Arabia, et cetera. Occasionally, people also go to punjab to work in fields. Many people used to work in kathmandu valley as free lancers. It involves fruit selling, footpath garment stores, cutting hair (especially by the people belonging to "hajam caste"), et cetera.

== Infrastructures ==
Badaharwa is a education for 5 school.
