= Inaruwa =

Inaruwa may refer to:

- Inaruwa, Kosi, headquarters of Sunsari District in Nepal
- Inaruwa, Narayani, a village development committee in Rautahat District in the Narayani Zone of south-eastern Nepal
