= Madanpur, Nepal =

Madanpur, Nepal may refer to:

- Madanpur, Bagmati
- Madanpur, Narayani
