= Saunaraniya =

Sonarniya सोनरनियाँ
- Village development committee
- Location in Nepal
- Coordinates: 26.94°N 85.18°E
- Country: Nepal
- Zone: Narayani Zone
- District: Rautahat District

Population (1991)
  - Total: 3,763
- Time zone: UTC+5:45 (Nepal Time)

Saunaraniya (legally 'Sonarniya') is a village development committee in Rautahat District in Maulapur Municipality in Madhesh Pradesh of Nepal after Nepal started using a Provincial government. It's in the Narayani Zone of south-eastern Nepal. It is a small village between Maulapur and Inarwamal. At the time of the 1991 Nepal census it had a population of 3763 people living in 689 individual households.
