= Sarmujawa =

Sarmujawa सरमुजवा
- Village development committee
- Location in Nepal
- Coordinates: 26.88°N 85.19°E
- Country: Nepal
- Zone: Narayani Zone
- District: Rautahat District

Population (1991)
  - Total: 5,896
- Time zone: UTC+5:45 (Nepal Time)

Sarmujawa is a village of Budhimai Municipality in Rautahat District in the Madhesh Province of south-eastern Nepal. At the time of the 1991 Nepal census it had a population of 5896 people living in 1069 individual households.
