= Ramoli Bairiya =

Coordinates: 26°59′N 85°21′E

Ramoli Bairiya रामोली बैरिया
- Village development committee
- Interactive map of Ramoli Bairiya
- Country: Nepal
- Zone: Narayani Zone
- District: Rautahat District

Population (1991)
  - Total: 3,724
- Time zone: UTC+5:45 (Nepal Time)

Ramoli Bairiya is a village development committee in Rautahat District in the Narayani Zone of south-eastern Nepal. At the time of the 1991 Nepal census it had a population of 3724 people living in 705 individual households.
