= Narkatiya Guthi =

Narkatiya Guthi नरकटिया गुठी
- Village development committee
- Location in Nepal
- Coordinates: 26.85°N 85.20°E
- Country: Nepal
- Zone: Narayani Zone
- District: Rautahat District

Population (1991)
  - Total: 4,893
- Time zone: UTC+5:45 (Nepal Time)

Narkatiya Guthi is a Paroha Municipality in Rautahat District in the Narayani Zone of south-eastern Nepal. At the time of the 1991 Nepal census it had a population of 4893 people living in 919 individual households.
