= Maryadpur =

Maryadpur may refer to:

- Maryadpur, Lumbini, Nepal
- Maryadpur, Narayani, Nepal
