= Yamunamai Rural Municipality =

Yamunamai यमुनामाई
- Rural Municipality
- Location in Nepal
- Coordinates: 26.78°N 85.24°E
- Country: Nepal
- Development Region: Central
- Zone: Narayani
- District: Rautahat
- Province: Province No. 2
- Established: 2016 A.D. (2073 B.S.)

Area
  - Total: 16.70 km^{2} (6.45 sq mi)

Population (2011)
  - Total: 23,884
  - Density: 1,430/km^{2} (3,704/sq mi)
  - Religions: Hindu Muslim Christian

Languages
  - Local: Bajjika, Tharu, Nepali
- Time zone: UTC+5:45 (NST)
- Postal Code: 44500
- Area code: 055
- Website: www.yamunamaimun.gov.np

Yamunamai (Nepali: यमुनामाई) is a rural municipality in Rautahat District, a part of Province No. 2 in Nepal. It was formed in 2016 occupying current 5 sections (wards) from previous 5 former VDCs. It occupies an area of 16.70 km^{2} with a total population of 23,884.
