= Phatuwa Harsaha =

Coordinates: 27°3′N 85°12′E

Phatuha Harsaha फतुहा हर्षाहा
- Village development committee
- Interactive map of Phatuha Harsaha
- Country: Nepal
- Zone: Narayani Zone
- District: Rautahat District

Population (1991)
  - Total: 3,424
- Time zone: UTC+5:45 (Nepal Time)

Phatuha Harsaha is a village development committee in Rautahat District in the Narayani Zone of south-eastern Nepal. At the time of the 1991 Nepal census it had a population of 3424.
