= Jihuli =

Coordinates: 26.608°N 85.243°E

Jihuli is a village in the East Champaran district of Bihar, India.

Jihuli is one of 37 villages in Patahi Block. Villagers speak Vajjika, Hindi, and Urdu, though Vajjika is the local language. Ihuli is one of the villages in Patahi Block in Purvi Champaran district of Bihar. The total population of the village is 9,328. The literacy rate is 38.26%. The female literacy rate is 31.03%. The male literacy rate is 44.75%. The number of households in Jihuli is 1,287. Female to male ratio of Jihuli is 91.85%. Female to male ratio of the village is less than state's female to male ratio 91.93%. The total working population is 36.66% of the total population. 60.44% of the men are working population. 10.14% of the women are working population. The main working population is 33.55% of the total population. 58.35% of the men are main working population. 5.89% of the women are main working population. While the marginal working population is 3.11% of the total population. 2.09% of the men are marginal working population. 4.25% of the women are marginal working population. The total non working population is 63.34% of the total population. 39.56% of the men are non working population. 89.86% of the women are non working population. Jihuli is a Big village and has a high school, 4 middle school and 14 small gov school. It has bus connectivity to district headquarter. Main Occupation of the village is farming.

== Industry ==
Agriculture is the village's major industry. People buy and sell commodities at the Jihuli Bazaar. Another nearby market is called the Pachpakri Bazaar.

== Governance ==
The village elects Mukhiya and Sarpanch to solve village disputes.

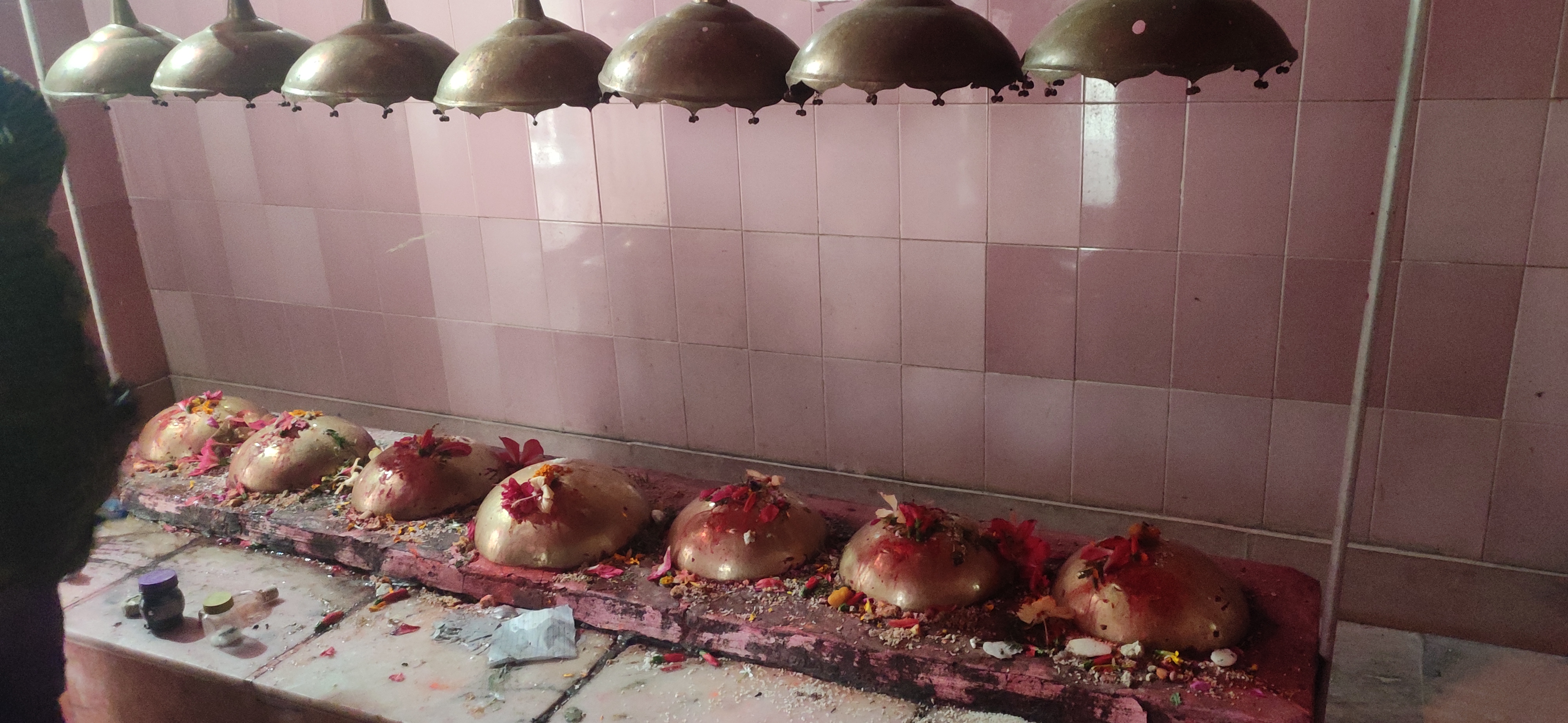
Maharani Ashtan, Jihuli Village

== Temples ==
There are many temples in the village, such as Hanuman Mandir (Sarkar Gachi), Hanuman Mandir (shekahi Tola), Ram Janki Mandir(Badka Math), Panchmukhi Mahavir Mandir, Maharani Asthan, Shiv Mandir, and Sapahi Devi.

Panchmukhi Mahavir Mandir

Some Images of the temple Panchmukhi Mahavir Mandir -

Temple God

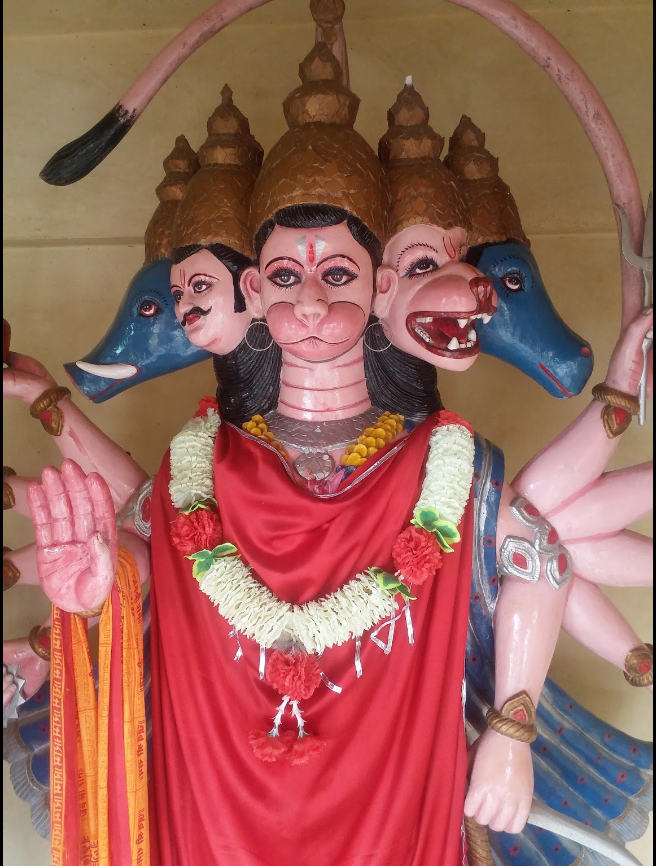
Temple God

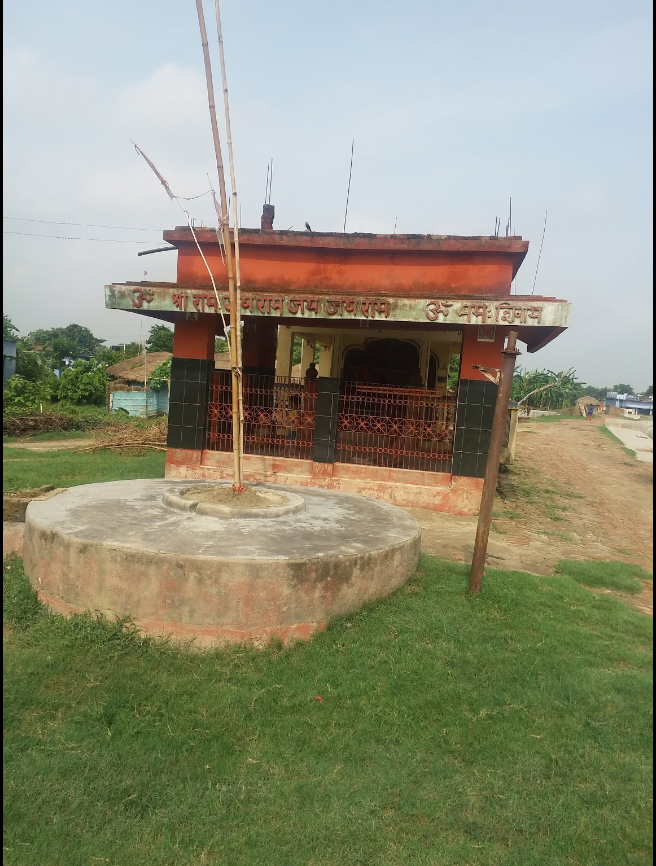
Temple Exterior

== Schools ==
There are many primary schools, two middle and one high school.

== Festivals ==
Villagers celebrate festivals like Durga Puja, Mahaviri Jhanda and Chhath.
