= Katahariya =

Katahariya कटहरिया
- Municipality
- Location in Nepal
- Coordinates: 26.97°N 85.21°E
- Country: Nepal
- Development Region: Central
- Zone: Narayani
- District: Rautahat
- Province: Province No. 2
- Established: 2016 A.D. (2073 B.S.)

Government
  - Mayor: Ajay Prakash Jaiswal
  - Deputy Mayor: Rita Devi Yadav

Area
  - Total: 40.69 km^{2} (15.71 sq mi)

Population (2011)
  - Total: 38,513
  - Density: 946.5/km^{2} (2,451/sq mi)
  - Religions: Hindu Muslim

Languages
  - Local: Maithili, Tharu, Nepali
- Time zone: UTC+5:45 (NST)
- Postal Code: 44500
- Area code: 055
- Website: www.katahariyamun.gov.np

Katahariya (Maithili: कटहरिया) is a municipality in Rautahat District in the Narayani Zone of south-eastern Nepal. Before September 2017, Katahariya was one of the Village Development Committees (VDC) with 8 wards. At the time of the 1991 Nepal census, it had a population of 4,619 people living in 835 individual households. Katahariya is famous for its unique mutton dish "Katiya". It has a well-maintained farmers' market (vegetable) and cattle (domestic-animal) market. Katahariya is a fast-growing municipality, with the main occupations of local people being business and farming.

Katahariya became a municipality since September 2017 by merging different Gaupalika (previously VDCs) such as Hathiyahi, Birti Prastoka, Bhasedhawa, Bagahi, Balirampur, Pipra Pokhariya. Currently, there are 9 wards in this municipality. In the recent local level election conducted on 13 May 2022, Ajay Prakash Jaiswal from Nepali Congress became the mayor however After the corruption case was filed by the authority, Mayor Ajay Prakash Jaiswal was suspended alone with 4 other board members since 4 June 2024.

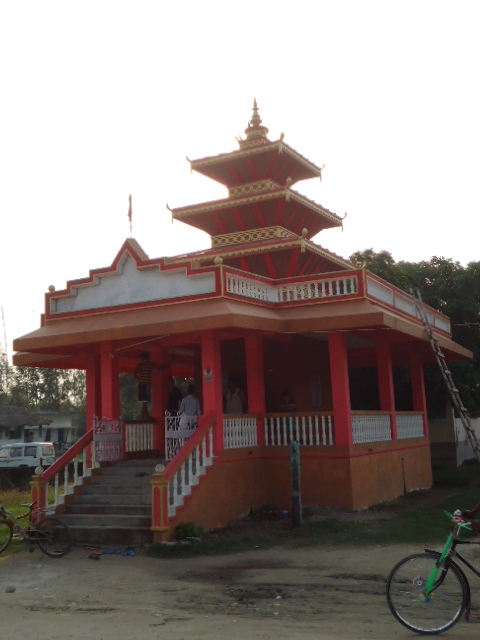
Boudhimai temple

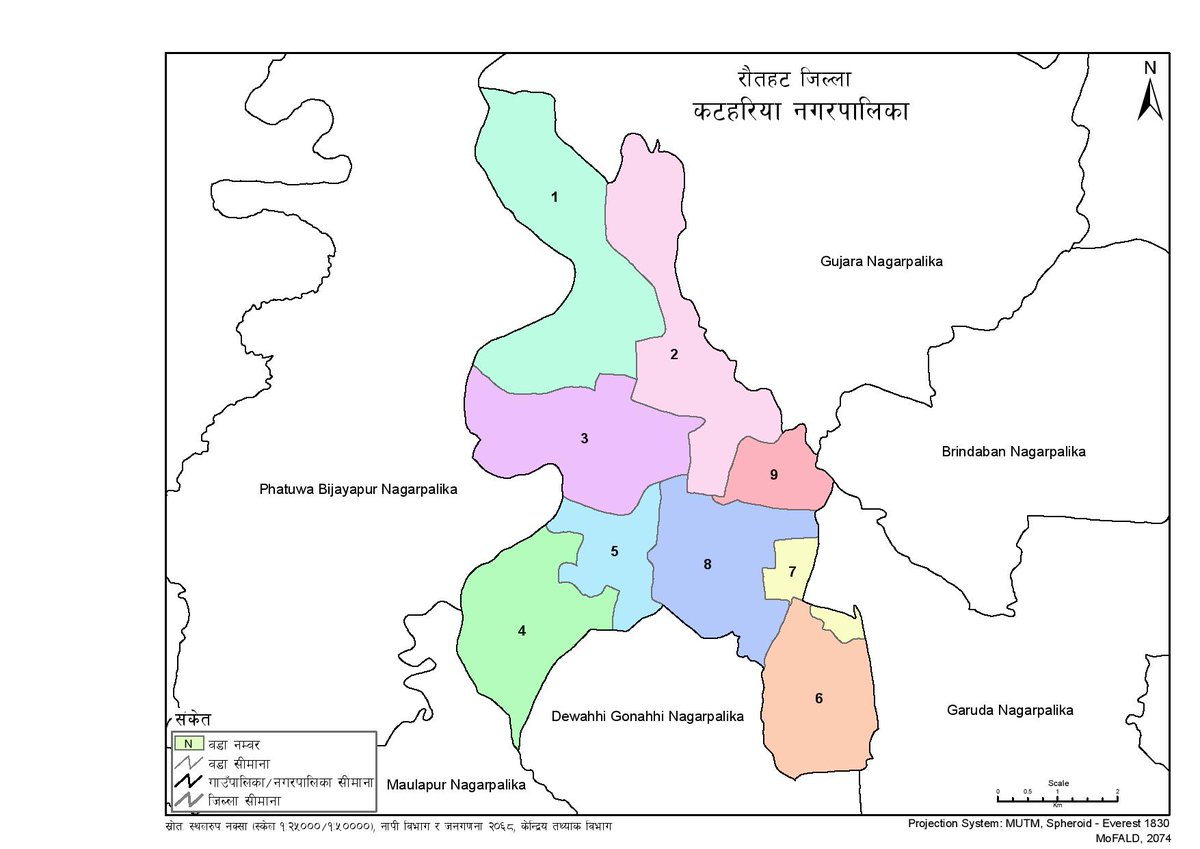
2017 map of Katahariya

== Other developments ==
=== Campus and school ===
- Shree Janta Higher Secondary School kth
- Shree Trishakti Academy English Boarding School

=== Hospital ===
Katahariya PHCC, with 24 hour Emergency Service

=== Banks ===
- Nepal Bank Limited - Katahariya Branch
- Gramin Bikash Bank Ltd
- Deprosc Laghubitta Bikas Bank Limited

=== Communication Networks ===
- Nepal Telecom
- Ncell

Other cellular networks available are UTL Nepal and Smart Cell.
