= Badharwa =

Badharwa बडहरवा
- Village development committee
- Location in Nepal
- Coordinates: 26.81°N 85.32°E
- Country: Nepal
- Zone: Narayani Zone
- District: Rautahat District

Population (2011)
  - Total: 4,949
- Time zone: UTC+5:45 (Nepal Time)

Badharwa (also: Badaharwa; Nepali:बडहरवा) is a village development committee in Rautahat District in the Narayani Zone of southeastern Nepal.

== Geography ==
The village is separated into two parts by the Bagmati River: the east side and the west side. Although the majority of the area taken up by the village lies on the western side, the majority of the population live on the eastern side. Although Rautahat District is separated from the Sarlahi District by Bagmati River in most of its parts, the exceptions are Badaharwa, Dharmapuri and Sedhwa village. Consequently, the village faces Sarlahi district in the east, Matsari village in the north, Saruatha and Jhunkhunwa village in the west and Basatpur village in the south.

== Demographics ==
According to the census of 2011, the total population of the village is 4949. The male population is 2616 and the female population is 2333. The total number of households is 802.
