= Sundar Basti =

- City
- Location in Nepal Sundar Basti (Nepal)
- Coordinates: 27.883161°N 83.932743°E
- Country: Nepal
- Dolpa: Syangja District
- Chharka Tangshong Rural Municipality: Kakot

Area
  - Total: 0.5 km^{2} (0.19 sq mi)

Population (2011 Nepal census)
  - Total: 900
  - Density: 1,800/km^{2} (4,700/sq mi)
  - Ethnicities: Brahmin
- Time zone: UTC+5:45 (Nepal Time)
- Area code: +977-63
- HQ Dunai: Office of Chharka Tangshong

Sundar Basti is a village of Kakot in the eastern part of Dolpa District in the central part of Nepal. According to the 2011 Nepal census, it had a total population of 900 people residing in 400 individual households.
