= Garuda Bairiya =

Garuda Bairiya गरुडा बैरिया
- Village development committee
- Nickname: Garuda
- Location in Nepal
- Coordinates: 26.95°N 85.32°E
- Country: Nepal
- Zone: Narayani Zone
- District: Rautahat District

Population (1991)
  - Total: 1,878
- Time zone: UTC+5:45 (Nepal Time)

Garuda Bairiya is a village development committee in Rautahat District in the Narayani Zone of south-eastern Nepal. At the time of the 1991 Nepal census it had a population of 1878 people living in 313 individual households. By 2012, the VDC had largely increased in size and its population reached more than 10000 approximately. The village is divided into two areas: the bajar and the gaun. Birendra highway passes through the Bajar which has Chandranigahpur on the north connecting the East-West highway and Gaur on the south which is on the Nepal-India Border. The VDC gained its fortune after the Birendra Highway was constructed. After the highway construction, developments and infrastructures followed around the VDC areas. In ancient time, the owner of Garuda gaun is Mathur Chaudhry In 1994 A.D. Shree Ram Sugar Mill was erected in Garuda. With the establishment of the sugar industry, farmers had opportunity to open business with the factory. They increased their sugarcane farming and sold it to the factory in their backyard. The factory provided jobs and opened sources of business in the VDC. Hence, today the VDC is a fast-growing town with every business one can name. It is the center of business in the area with few banks, five-six petrol pumps, hundreds of Grocery stores, handful of Shopping centers, small granary and Eating-oil mills, shoes factory, a High school, several restaurants, clinics and Elaka police Station. It has highest economic rate among all villages in its districts. Some of the major people like Jaiswal, Sharma, etc are well known for their business standard in Garuda. The VDC also has a movie theatre. Transport is available throughout all day and sparsely at the night. Approximately 50% of the people are involved directly in farming and the other 50% in Business or other traditional works.

== Media ==
To promote local culture Garuda has one FM radio station, Radio Madhesh Jana awaj – 98.6 MHz, which is a community radio station.

To promote local culture Garuda has one FM radio station, radio madhesh masla – 106.4 MHz, which is a community radio station.

== Hospital ==
1. Prakashjit Eye Care & Opticals
