= Bagahi =

Bagahi may refer to areas in Nepal:

- Bagahi, Parsa, Nepal
- Bagahi, Rautahat, Nepal
