= Pathara Budharampur =

Pathara Budharampur पथहरा बुधरामपुर
- Village development committee
- Location in Nepal
- Coordinates: 26.91°N 85.20°E
- Country: Nepal
- Zone: Narayani Zone
- District: Rautahat District

Population (1991)
  - Total: 4,146
- Time zone: UTC+5:45 (Nepal Time)

Pathara Budharampur is a village development committee in Rautahat District in the Narayani Zone of south-eastern Nepal. At the time of the 1991 Nepal census it had a population of 4146 people living in 736 individual households.
