= Akolawa =

Place in Nepal

Akolawa अकोलवा
- Village development committee
- Location in Nepal
- Coordinates: 26.81°N 85.25°E
- Country: Nepal
- Zone: Narayani Zone
- District: Rautahat District

Population (1991)
  - Total: 4,238
- Time zone: UTC+5:45 (Nepal Time)

Akolawa is a village development region committee in Rautahat District in the Narayani Zone of central development region of Nepal. At the time of the 1991 Nepal census it had a population of 4238 people living in 744 individual households.
