= Matsari =

Matsari मत्सरी
- Village
- Location in Nepal
- Coordinates: 26.83°N 85.33°E
- Country: Nepal
- Zone: Narayani Zone
- District: Rautahat District

Population (1991)
  - Total: 3,157
- Time zone: UTC+5:45 (Nepal Time)

Matsari (मत्सरी) is a village of Durga Bhagwati rural municipality in Rautahat District in the Narayani Zone of south-eastern Nepal. The village is situated at the bank of Bagmati river. It lies around 8 kilometers north of the district headquarters Gaur.

Bhojpuri, Bajika, and Maithili are the languages spoken in the village.
