= Bishrampur, Rautahat =

Bishrampur बिश्रामपुर
- Village development committee
- Location in Nepal
- Coordinates: 27.07°N 85.41°E
- Country: Nepal
- Zone: Narayani Zone
- District: Rautahat District

Population (2011)
  - Total: 11,948
- Time zone: UTC+5:45 (Nepal Time)

Bishrampur is a village development committee in Rautahat District in the Narayani Zone of south-eastern Nepal. At the time of the census 2011 AD it had a population of 11948 people living in 1229 individual households. Benauli is village which falls under this village. Now Bishrampur is a municipality named as Brindawan Municipality. The municipality consists of villages like Benauli, Ramauli, Bishrampur, Haraiya, Pipra, Harsaha, Bargajawa.
