= Raghunathpur, Rautahat =

Raghunathpur रघुनाथपुर
- Village development committee
- Location in Nepal
- Coordinates: 26°58′N 85°21′E
- Country: Nepal
- Zone: Narayani Zone
- District: Rautahat District

Population (1991)
  - Total: 3,484
- Time zone: UTC+5:45 (Nepal Time)

Raghunathpur is a village development committee in Rautahat District in the Narayani Zone of south-eastern Nepal. At the time of the 1991 Nepal census it had a population of 3484 people living in 673 individual households.
