= Jethrahiya =

Jethrahiya जेठ्राहिया
- Village development committee
- Location in Nepal
- Coordinates: 26.87°N 85.31°E
- Country: Nepal
- Zone: Narayani Zone
- District: Rautahat District

Population (2011)
  - Total: 4,225
- Time zone: UTC+5:45 (Nepal Time)

Jethrahiya is a village development committee in Rautahat District in the Narayani Zone of south-eastern Nepal. At the time of the 2011 Nepal census it had a population of 4225 people living in 664 individual households.
