= Karkach Karmaiya =

Karkach Karmaiya कारकच कर्मैया
- Village development committee
- Location in Nepal
- Coordinates: 26.95°N 85.25°E
- Country: Nepal
- Zone: Narayani Zone
- District: Rautahat District

Population (2011)
  - Total: 7,563
- Time zone: UTC+5:45 (Nepal Time)

Karkach Karmaiya is a village development committee in Rautahat District in the Narayani Zone of south-eastern Nepal. At the time of the 1991 Nepal census it had a population of 4685 people living in 821 individual households.
