= Tengraha =

Tengraha टेंग्राहा
- Village development committee
- Location in Nepal
- Coordinates: 26.97°N 85.19°E
- Country: Nepal
- Zone: Narayani Zone
- District: Rautahat District

Population (1991)
  - Total: 3,503
- Time zone: UTC+5:45 (Nepal Time)

Tengraha is a village development committee in Rautahat District in the Narayani Zone of south-eastern Nepal. At the time of the 1991 Nepal census it had a population of 3503 people living in 637 individual households.
