= Hajminiya =

Hajminiya हजमिनिया Hathiaull
- Village development committee
- Nickname: हथिऑल
- Location in Nepal
- Coordinates: 26.79°N 85.30°E
- Country: Nepal
- Zone: Narayani Zone
- District: Rautahat District

Population (1991)
  - Total: 2,998
- Time zone: UTC+5:45 (Nepal Time)

Hajminiya is a village development committee in Rautahat District in the Narayani Zone of south-eastern Nepal. At the time of the 1991 Nepal census it had a population of 2998 people living in 636 individual households.
