= Harsaha =

Coordinates: 27°01′N 85°20′E

Harsaha हर्षाहा
- Village development committee
- Interactive map of Harsaha
- Country: Nepal
- Zone: Narayani Zone
- District: Rautahat District

Population (1991)
  - Total: 3,026
- Time zone: UTC+5:45 (Nepal Time)

Harsaha is a village development committee in Rautahat District in the Narayani Zone of south-eastern Nepal. At the time of the 1991 Nepal census it had a population of 3026 people living in 535 individual households.
