= Basantapatti =

Basantapatti बसन्तपट्टी
- Village development committee
- Location in Nepal
- Coordinates: 26.85°N 85.23°E
- Country: Nepal
- Zone: Narayani Zone
- District: Rautahat District

Population (1991)
  - Total: 6,258
- Time zone: UTC+5:45 (Nepal Time)

Basantapatti is a village development committee in Rautahat District in the Narayani Zone of south-eastern Nepal. At the time of the 1991 Nepal census it had a population of 6258.
