= Inarbari Jyutahi =

Inarbari Jyutahi इनर्बारी ज्युटाही
- Village development committee
- Interactive map of Inarbari Jyutahi
- Country: Nepal
- Zone: Narayani Zone
- District: Rautahat District

Population (1991)
  - Total: 4,193
- Time zone: UTC+5:45 (Nepal Time)
- Website: www.carkverma.com

Inarbari Jyutahi is a village development committee in Rautahat District in the Narayani Zone of south-eastern Nepal. At the time of the 1991 Nepal census it had a population of 4193 people living in 775 individual households.
