= Rangapur, Rautahat =

Coordinates: 27°5′N 85°18′E

Rangapur रङ्गपुर
- Village development committee
- Interactive map of Rangapur
- Country: Nepal
- Zone: Narayani Zone
- District: Rautahat District

Population (1991)
  - Total: 8,141
- Time zone: UTC+5:45 (Nepal Time)

Rangapur is a village development committee in Rautahat District in the Narayani Zone of south-eastern Nepal. At the time of the 1991 Nepal census it had a population of 8141 people living in 1487 individual households.
