= Brahmapuri, Rautahat =

Village development committee in Narayani Zone, Nepal

Brahmapuri ब्रह्मापुरी
- Village development committee
- VDC Map of Sarlahi District

- Location in Nepal
- Coordinates: 26.76°N 85.32°E
- Country: Nepal
- Zone: Narayani Zone
- District: Rautahat District

Population (1991)
  - Total: 4,014
- Time zone: UTC+5:45 (Nepal Time)

Brahmapuri is a village development committee in Rautahat District in the Narayani Zone of south-eastern Nepal, near the India–Nepal border. At the time of the 1991 Nepal census it had a population of 4014.
