= Bisunpurwa Manpur =

Coordinates: 26°53′N 85°20′E

Bishnupurwa Manpur विष्णुपुर्वा मनपुर
- Village development committee
- Interactive map of Bishnupurwa Manpur
- Country: Nepal
- Zone: Narayani Zone
- District: Rautahat District

Government

Population (2010)
  - Total: 3,500
- Time zone: UTC+5:45 (Nepal Time)
- Area code: 4

Vishnupurwa Manpur is a village development committee in Rautahat District in the Narayani Zone of south-eastern Nepal. At the time of the 1991 Nepal census it had a population of 2244 people living in 475 individual households.
