= Karuniya =

Karuniya करुनिया
- Village development committee
- Location in Nepal
- Coordinates: 26.89°N 85.27°E
- Country: Nepal
- Zone: Narayani Zone
- District: Rautahat District

Population (1991)
  - Total: 4,436
- Time zone: UTC+5:45 (Nepal Time)

Karuniya is a village development committee in Rautahat District in the Narayani Zone of south-eastern Nepal. At the time of the 1991 Nepal census it had a population of 4437 people living in 834 individual households. It's among few Muslim majority villages of Nepal.
