= Banjaraha =

Banjaraha बञ्जरहा
- Village development committee
- Location in Nepal
- Coordinates: 26.77°N 85.25°E
- Country: Nepal
- Zone: Narayani Zone
- District: Rautahat District

Population (1991)
  - Total: 1,856
- Time zone: UTC+5:45 (Nepal Time)

Banjaraha is a Village Development Committee in Rautahat District in the Narayani Zone of south-eastern Nepal. At the time of the 1991 Nepal census, it had a population of 1,856 people living in 326 individual households.
