= Lakshmipur, Rautahat =

Coordinates: 26°57′N 85°20′E

Lakshmipur लक्ष्मीपुर
- Village development committee
- Interactive map of Lakshmipur
- Country: Nepal
- Zone: Narayani Zone
- District: Rautahat District

Population (1991)
  - Total: 3,459
- Time zone: UTC+5:45 (Nepal Time)

Lakshmipur is a village development committee in Rautahat District in the Narayani Zone of south-eastern Nepal. At the time of the 1991 Nepal census it had a population of 3459 people living in 594 individual households.
