= Santapur =

Coordinates: 27°1′N 85°12′E

Santapur सन्तपुर
- Village development committee
- Interactive map of Santapur
- Country: Nepal
- Zone: Narayani Zone
- District: Rautahat District

Population (2011)
  - Total: 25,000
- Time zone: UTC+5:45 (Nepal Time)

Santapur is a village development committee in Rautahat District in the Narayani Zone of south-eastern Nepal. At the time of the 2011 Nepal census it had a population of 25000.

Santapur is a VDC that falls in newly made municipality Chandrapur, in Rautaht district, Narayani zone of Nepal that is on the way to Gaur. It has its own name and fame. As it consists of district's old school Shree Subhlalal Madhyamik bidhyalaya.it has two campuses. Besides this there are 3 private boarding schools. It has approximately population of 25000 recently In the census 2068 B.S.many students of this villages are studying medicals in other countries like India and Bangladesh
