= Pipra Bhagwanpur =

Pipra Bhagwanpur पिपरा भगवानपुर
- Village development committee
- Location in Nepal
- Coordinates: 26.80°N 85.28°E
- Country: Nepal
- Zone: Narayani Zone
- District: Rautahat District

Population (2023)
  - Total: 4,698
- Time zone: UTC+5:45 (Nepal Time)

Pipra Bhagwanpur is a village development committee in Rautahat District in the Province No. 2 of south-eastern Nepal. At the time of the 1991 Nepal census it had a population of 3698 people living in 715 individual households.
