= Ramauli Bairiya =

Ramauli Bairiya (रमौली बैरिया) is a village development committee in Rautahat District, Narayani Zone of southeastern Nepal. It had a population of 6,377 people, in 918 individual households, as of the nation's 2011 census. Later It was changed to Brindaban (Nepali: बृन्दावन) is a municipality in Rautahat District, a part of Province No. 2 in Nepal in 2016. It was formed in 2016 occupying current 9 sections (wards) from previous 9 former VDCs. It occupies an area of 95.40 km^{2} with a total populationof 49742. It is bounded on the east by Sarlahi district, on the west by Chandrapur and Gujara municipalities, on the north by Chandrapur municipality and on the south by Gadhimai and Garuda municipalities
