= Shitalpur Bairgania =

Bairganiya बैरगनियाँ
- Village development committee
- Nickname: यादव बस्ति
- Location in Nepal
- Coordinates: 26.98°N 85.20°E
- Country: Nepal
- Zone: Narayani Zone
- District: Rautahat District

Population (2082)
  - Total: 5,000
- Time zone: UTC+5:45 (Nepal Time)
- Area code: 44500

Bairganiya is a village development committee in Rautahat District, Madhesh Province the Narayani Zone of south-eastern Nepal. At the time of the 1991 Nepal census it had a population of 5000 people living in 875 individual households. #Yadav Sarkar
