= Rampur Khap =

Coordinates: 26°49′N 85°12′E

Rampur Khap रामपुर खाप Khap
- Paroha Rural municipality
- Paroha Muncilpaltry 9 Rampur Khap
- Nickname: Rampur
- Interactive map of Rampur Khap
- Nepal: Nepal
- Zone: Narayani Zone
- District: Rautahat District

Government

Population (2011)
  - Total: 5,233
  - Density: 2/km^{2} (5.2/sq mi)
- Time zone: UTC+5:45 (Nepal Time)
- Area code: 44500

Rampur Khap is a village development committee in Rautahat District in the Narayani Zone of south-eastern Nepal. At the time of the 1991 Nepal census it had a population of 3194 people living in 594 individual households.
