= Hardiya Paltuwa =

Village development committee in Narayani Zone, Nepal

Hardiya Paltuwa हर्दिया पल्टुवा
- Village development committee
- Interactive map of Hardiya Paltuwa
- Country: Nepal
- Zone: Narayani Zone
- District: Rautahat District

Population (1991)
  - Total: 2,609
- Time zone: UTC+5:45 (Nepal Time)

Hardiya Paltuwa is a village development committee in Rautahat District in the Narayani Zone of south-eastern Nepal. At the time of the 1991 Nepal census it had a population of 2609 people living in 517 individual households.
