= Sawagada =

Sabgadha सबगढा
- Village development committee
- Sabgadha
- Country: Nepal
- Zone: Narayani Zone
- District: Rautahat District
- Time zone: UTC+5:45 (Nepal Time)

Sabgadha is formerly a village development committee in Rautahat District in the Narayani Zone of south-eastern Nepal. It is now ward number 6 of Gaur Municipality, which is the biggest ward of the municipality. It has a dense population but put back in sector of development. It is surrounded by Bakaiya river to the west, ward number 4 to the south, ward number 7 to the east, and Rajpur municipality to the north.
