= Simara Bhawanipur =

Village development committee in Narayani Zone, Nepal

Simara Bhawanipur सिमरा भवानीपुर Bhawanipur
- Village development committee
- Location in Nepal
- Coordinates: 27.04°N 85.31°E
- Country: Nepal
- Zone: Narayani Zone
- District: Rautahat District

Population (1991)
  - Total: 5,035
- Time zone: UTC+5:45 (Nepal Time)

Simara Bhawanipur is a village development committee in Rautahat District in the Narayani Zone of south-eastern Nepal. At the time of the 1991 Nepal census it had a population of 5,035 people living in 978 individual households.
