= Dumriyachaur =

Dumriyachaur डुमरियाचौर
- Village development committee
- Country: Nepal
- Zone: Narayani Zone
- District: Rautahat District

Population (1991)
  - Total: 2,867
- Time zone: UTC+5:45 (Nepal Time)

Dumriyachaur is a village development committee in Rautahat District in the Narayani Zone of south-eastern Nepal. At the time of the 1991 Nepal census it had a population of 2867 people living in 493 individual households.
