= Jayanagar, Rautahat =

Jayanagar जयनगर
- Village Development Committee
- Location in Nepal
- Coordinates: 26.9167°N 85.3167°E
- Country: Nepal
- Zone: Narayani Zone
- District: Rautahat District

Population (1991)
  - Total: 3,153
- Time zone: UTC+5:45 (Nepal Time)

Jayanagar is a Village Development Committee in Rautahat District in the Narayani Zone of south-eastern Nepal. At the time of the 1991 Nepal census it had a population of 3153 people residing in 570 individual households.

Jayanagar means "Victory Town".
