= Katiya =

Nepalese mutton dish

- Type: Non-vegetarian
- Place of origin: Nepal
- Region or state: Madhesh Province
- Created by: [Madheshis]

Katiya is a traditional Nepalese Madheshi cuisine consisting of unique mutton curry cooked in clay pots over a coal bed native to Madheshi community of Nepalese side and originated from the Katahariya town of Rautahat district. It is popular throughout among Madhesis including Rajbanshi and Tharu people of Madhesh Province and Koshi Province.

Katiya is prepared by mixing spices, chilies, garlic and onion with mutton. Salt, turmeric and oil is added in the clay pot and the mutton is put in it. The clay pot is then cooked inside coal for about half hour. It is served with rice, chapati or bhooja.
