= Jatahare =

Coordinates: 26°48′N 85°13′E

Jatahare जटाहरे
- Village development committee
- Interactive map of Jatahare
- Country: Nepal
- Zone: Narayani Zone
- District: Rautahat District

Population (1991)
  - Total: 5,402
- Time zone: UTC+5:45 (Nepal Time)

Jatahare is a village development committee in Rautahat District in the Narayani Zone of south-eastern Nepal. At the time of the 1991 Nepal census it had a population of 5,402 people living in 941 individual households.
