= Tejapakar =

Tejapakad तेजपाकड
- Village development committee
- Location in Nepal
- Coordinates: 26.88°N 85.26°E
- Country: Nepal
- Zone: Narayani Zone
- District: Rautahat District

Population (1991)
  - Total: 3,296
- Time zone: UTC+5:45 (Nepal Time)

Tejapakad is a village development committee in Rautahat District in the Narayani Zone of south-eastern Nepal. At the time of the 1991 Nepal census, it had a population of 3,296 people living in 605 individual households.
