= Dewahi Gonahi =

Dewahi Gonahi देवाही गोनाही
- Municipality
- Location in Nepal
- Coordinates: 26.93°N 85.26°E
- Country: Nepal
- Development Region: Central
- District: Rautahat
- Province: Madhesh
- Established: 2016 A.D. (2073 B.S.)

Government
  - Mayor: Prem Lal shah kanu CPN-UML
  - Deputy Mayor: Parnia Devi

Area
  - Total: 33.99 km^{2} (13.12 sq mi)

Population (2011)
  - Total: 32,143
  - Density: 945.7/km^{2} (2,449/sq mi)
  - Religions: Hindu Muslim Christian

Languages
  - Local: Maithili, Tharu, Nepali, Bajjika
- Time zone: UTC+5:45 (NST)
- Postal Code: 44500
- Area code: 055
- Website: www.dewahigonahimun.gov.np

Dewahi Gonahi (Nepali: देवाही गोनाही) is a municipality in Rautahat District, a part of Madhesh Province in Nepal. It was formed in 2016 occupying current 9 sections (wards) from previous 9 former VDCs. It occupies an area of 33.99 km^{2} with a total population of 32,143.
