= Pratappur Paltuwa =

Pratappur Paltuwa प्रतापपुर पल्टुवा
- Village development committee
- Location in Nepal
- Coordinates: 27.02°N 85.29°E
- Country: Nepal
- Zone: Narayani Zone
- District: Rautahat District

Population (1991)
  - Total: 5,153
- Time zone: UTC+5:45 (Nepal Time)

Pratappur Paltuwa is a village development committee in Rautahat District in the Narayani Zone of south-eastern Nepal. At the time of the 1991 Nepal census it had a population of 5153 people living in 525 individual households.
