= Jowaha =

Coordinates: 26°49′N 85°12′E

Jokaha जोवाहा Jokaha
- Village development committee
- Nickname: जोकाहा
- Interactive map of Jokaha
- Country: Nepal
- Zone: Narayani Zone
- District: Rautahat District

Population (1991)
  - Total: 5,359
- Time zone: UTC+5:45 (Nepal Time)

Jowaha is a village development committee in Rautahat District in the Narayani Zone of south-eastern Nepal. At the time of the 1991 Nepal census it had a population of 5359 people living in 892 individual households.
