= Rajpur, Rautahat =

Rajpur Farhadwa राजपुर
- Municipality
- Location in Nepal
- Coordinates: 26.82°N 85.22°E
- Country: Nepal
- District: Rautahat
- Province: Madhesh
- Established: 2016 A.D. (2073 B.S.)

Government
  - Mayor: Mr. MD Rajik alam

Area
  - Total: 31.41 km^{2} (12.13 sq mi)

Population (2011)
  - Total: 41,136
  - Density: 1,310/km^{2} (3,392/sq mi)
  - Religions: Mostly Hindu Muslim

Languages
  - Local: Bajjika, Bhojpuri, Nepali, Hindi, Urdu Too
- Time zone: UTC+5:45 (NST)
- Postal Code: 44500
- Area code: 055
- Website: http://rajpurmunrautahat.gov.np/

Rajpur Farhadwa (Nepali: राजपुर) is a municipality in Rautahat District, a part of Madhesh Province in Nepal. It was formed in 2016 occupying current 9 sections (wards) from previous 9 former VDCs. It occupies an area of 31.41 km^{2} with a total population of 41,136 as of 2011.
