= Pacharukhi =

Pachrukhi पचरुखी
- Village development committee
- Location in Nepal
- Coordinates: 26.84°N 85.31°E
- Country: Nepal
- Zone: Narayani Zone
- District: Rautahat District

Population (1991)
  - Total: 3,132
- Time zone: UTC+5:45 (Nepal Time)

Rambhu Yadav Rautahat Nepal

Village Development Committee in Rautahat District in the Narayani Zone of south-eastern Nepal. At the time of the 1991 Nepal census it had a population of 3132 people living in 717 individual households.

Pachrukhi has a Large Pond where a Shiva Mandir is located. There are more than 2-6 Durga Temples .
