= Ajagaibi =

Place in Nepal

Ajagaibi अजगैबी
- Village development committee
- Location in Nepal
- Coordinates: 26.91°N 85.22°E
- Country: Nepal
- Province: Province No. 2
- District: Rautahat District

Population (1991)
  - Total: 2,923
- Time zone: UTC+5:45 (Nepal Time)

Ajagaibi is a village development committee in Rautahat District in Province No. 2 of south-eastern Nepal. At the time of the 1991 Nepal census it had a population of 2923 people.
