= Pipariya, Rautahat =

Pipariya (Dostiya) पिपरिया (दोस्तीया) Pipariya Dostiya
- Village development committee
- Location in Nepal
- Coordinates: 26.98°N 85.52°E
- Country: Nepal
- Zone: Narayani Zone
- District: Rautahat District

Population (1991)
  - Total: 3,786
- Time zone: UTC+5:45 (Nepal Time)

Pipariya Dostiya, Narayani is a village development committee in Rautahat District in the Narayani Zone of south-eastern Nepal. At the time of the 1991 Nepal census it had a population of 3786.It is also known as Pipariya (Do.). An Honest leader of Nepal Harihar Prasad Yadav was born here. (He serves as Finance Minister at Monarchy System during king Birendra)
