= Sakhuwa Dhamaura =

Sakhuawa Dhamaura सखुअवा धमौरा
- Village development committee
- Nickname: Sakhuawa Dhamaura
- Location in Nepal
- Coordinates: 26.99770°N 85.32630°E
- Country: Nepal
- Zone: Narayani Zone
- District: Rautahat District

Population (1991)
  - Total: 6,478
- Time zone: UTC+5:45 (Nepal Time)

Sakhuawa Dhamaura is a village development committee in Rautahat District in the Narayani Zone of south-eastern Nepal. At the time of the 1991 Nepal census it had a population of 6478 people living in 1266 individual households.
