= Birtiprastoka =

Coordinates: 26°59′N 85°15′E

Birtiprastoka बिर्तिप्रस्टोका
- Village development committee
- Interactive map of Birtiprastoka
- Country: Nepal
- Zone: Narayani Zone
- District: Rautahat District

Population (1991)
  - Total: 2,492
- Time zone: UTC+5:45 (Nepal Time)

Birtiprastoka is a village development committee in Rautahat District in the Narayani Zone of south-eastern Nepal. At the time of the 1991 Nepal census it had a population of 2492 people living in 478 individual households.

The main occupations of local people being farming and cultivation of plant nursery. The majority of the people are cultivating plants for gardens, for agriculture, for forestry etc. They are supplying different types of Fruits Plantations, Tree Plantation, Flower Plantation etc. to various city/town across the country.
