= Pipra Rajbara =

Village development committee in Narayani Zone, Nepal

Pipra Rajbara पिपरा राजबारा
- Village development committee
- Location in Nepal
- Coordinates: 26.87°N 85.34°E
- Country: Nepal
- Zone: Narayani Zone
- District: Rautahat District

Population (1991)
  - Total: 4,606
- Time zone: UTC+5:45 (Nepal Time)

Pipra Rajbara is a village development committee in Rautahat District in the Narayani Zone of south-eastern Nepal. At the time of the 1991 Nepal census it had a population of 4606 people living in 801 individual households.
