= Paurai =

Paurai पौराई
- Location in Nepal
- Coordinates: 27.15°N 85.46°E
- Country: Nepal
- Zone: Narayani Zone
- District: Rautahat District

Population (2011)
  - Total: 9,613
- Time zone: UTC+5:45 (Nepal Time)

Paurai is a town and market center in Chandrapur Municipality in Rautahat District in the Narayani Zone of south-eastern Nepal. The formerly village development committee was merged to form the municipality on 18 May 2014. At the time of the 2011 Nepal census it had a population of 9613 people living in 1821 individual households.

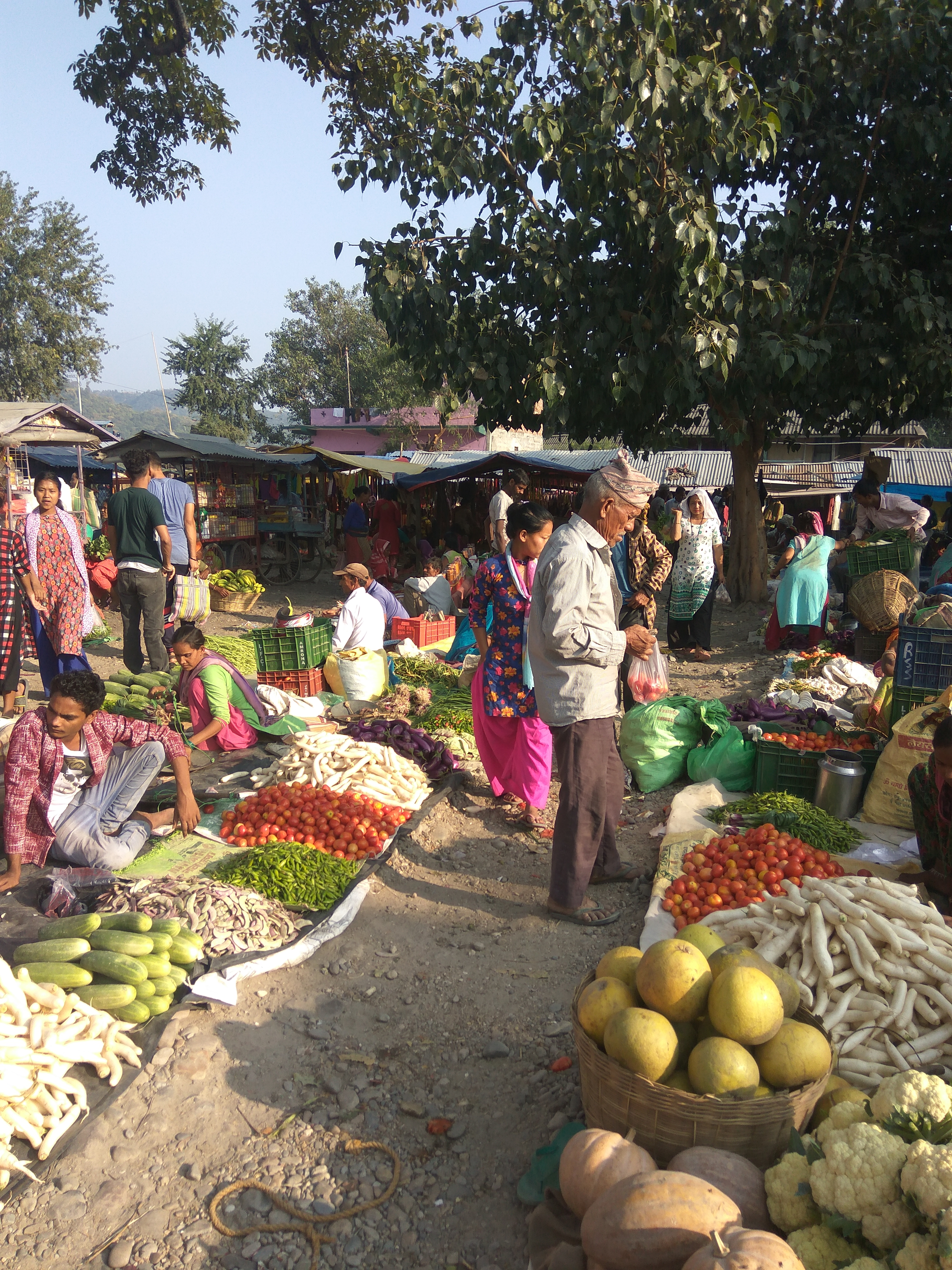
Haat Bazaar at Paurai

PAURAI is one of the 105 Villages Development Committee in Rautahat District in the Narayani Zone. There is one higher secondary school operated by government of Nepal. which is known as shree bagmati higher secondary school.

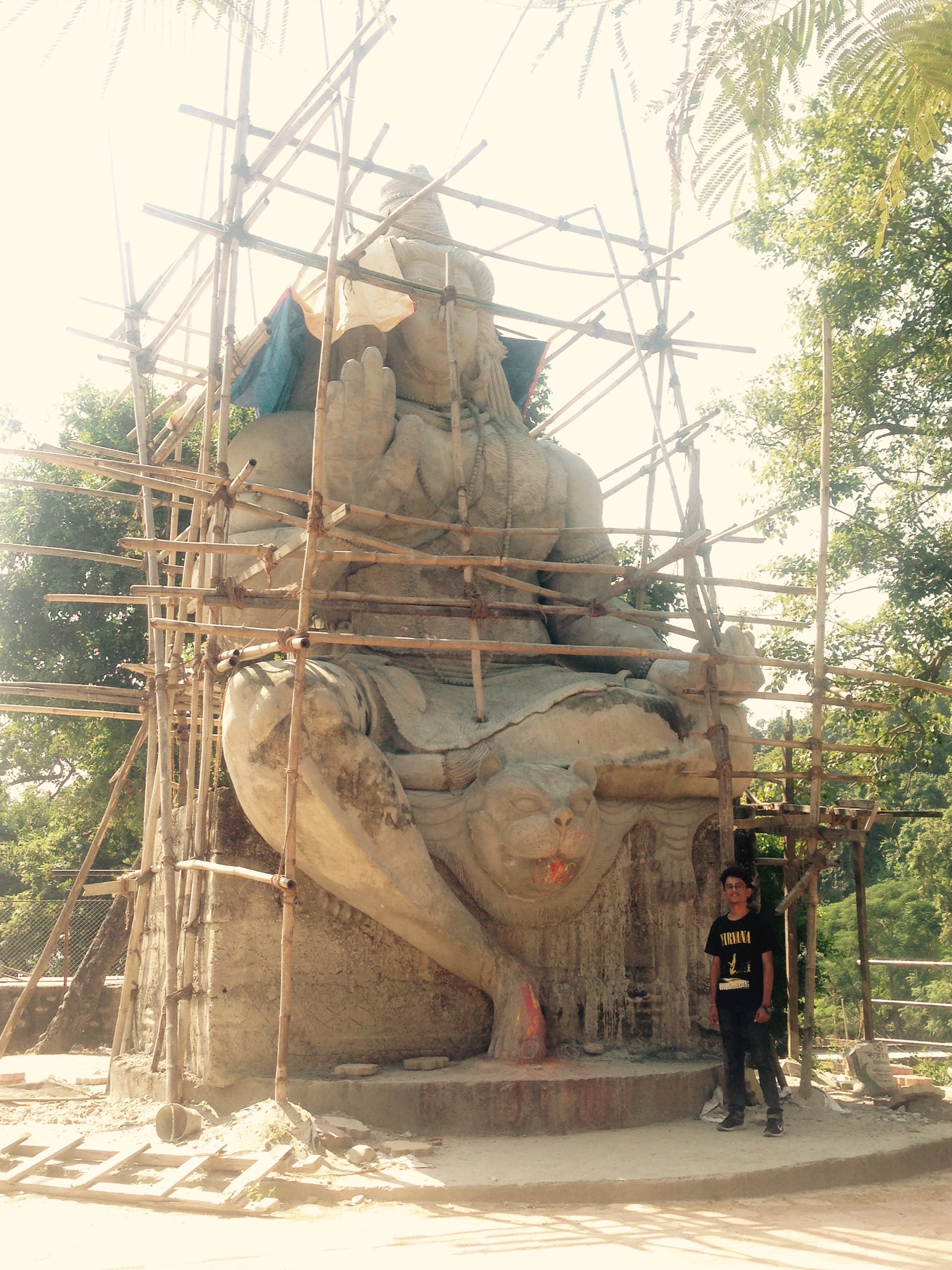
Lord Shiva Statue at Nunthar

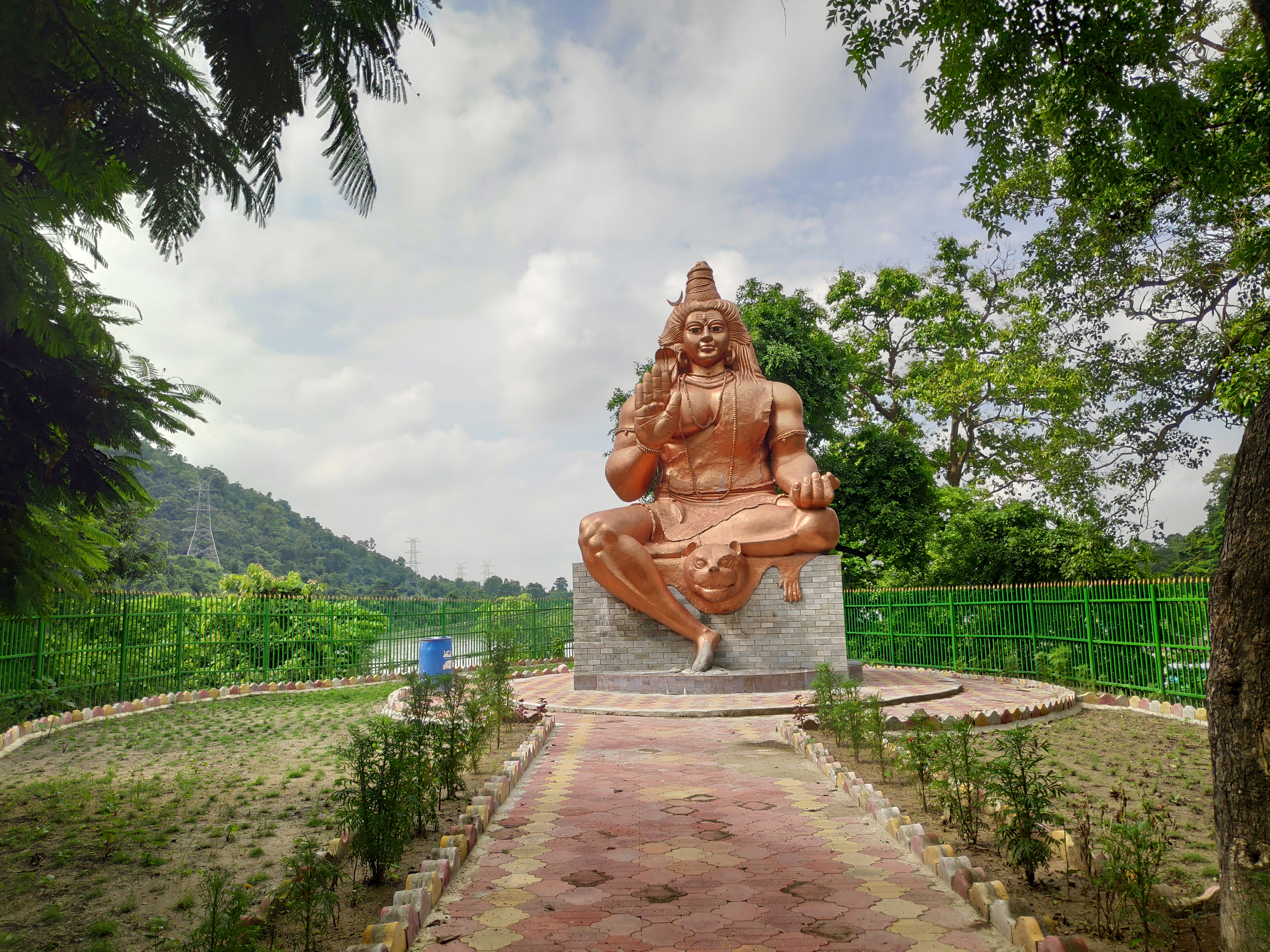
Nunthardham

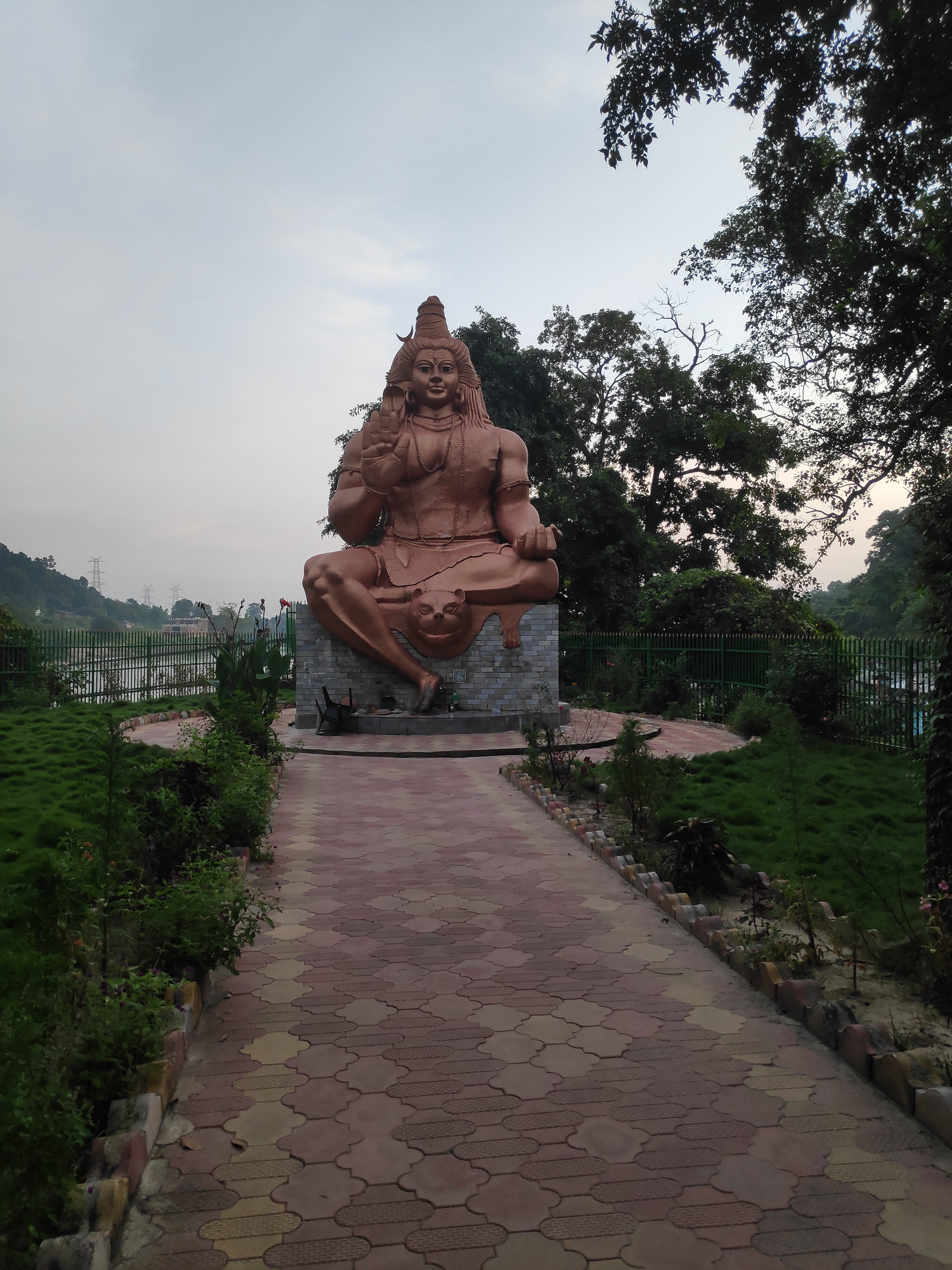
Nunthar Shiva Temple

Nunthar is a famous place for picnic spot and there is a temple of lord shiva too.
