= Khesarhiya =

Village development committee in Narayani Zone, Nepal

Khesarhiya केसरहिया
- Village development committee
- Location in Nepal
- Coordinates: 26.90°N 85.29°E
- Country: Nepal
- Zone: Narayani Zone
- District: Rautahat District

Population (1991)
  - Total: 1,995
- Time zone: UTC+5:45 (Nepal Time)

Khesarhiya is a village development committee in Rautahat District in the Narayani Zone of south-eastern Nepal. At the time of the 1991 Nepal census it had a population of 1995 people living in 364 individual households.
