= Brindaban, Rautahat =

Brindaban बृन्दावन
- Municipality
- Location in Nepal
- Coordinates: 27.03°N 85.28°E
- Country: Nepal
- Development Region: Central
- District: Rautahat
- Province: Madhesh
- Established: 2016 A.D. (2073 B.S.)

Government
  - Mayor: Binod Kumar Kurmi (CPN (US))
  - Deputy Mayor: Sangita Kumari Ram (CPN (US))

Area
  - Total: 95.50 km^{2} (36.87 sq mi)

Population (2021)
  - Total: 49,742(male:24,894 female:24,848)
  - Density: 520.9/km^{2} (1,349/sq mi)
  - Religions: Hindu Muslim Christian

Languages
  - Local: Maithili, Tharu, Bajjika, Bhojpuri, Nepali
- Time zone: UTC+5:45 (NST)
- Postal Code: 44500
- Area code: 055
- Website: www.brindawanmun.gov.np

Brindaban (Nepali: बृन्दावन) is a municipality in Rautahat District, a part of Province No. 2 in Nepal. It was formed in 2016 occupying current 9 sections (wards) from previous 9 former VDCs. It occupies an area of 95.40 km^{2} with a total population of 49742. It is bounded on the east by Sarlahi district, on the west by Chandrapur and Gujara municipalities, on the north by Chandrapur municipality and on the south by Gadhimai and Garuda municipalities.
