= Gangapipra =

Village development committee in Narayani Zone, Nepal

Coordinates: 26°51′N 85°20′E

Gangapipra गंगा पिपरा
- Village development committee
- Interactive map of Gangapipra
- Country: Nepal
- Zone: Narayani Zone
- District: Rautahat District

Population (1991)
  - Total: 2,547
- Time zone: UTC+5:45 (Nepal Time)

Gangapipra is a village development committee in Rautahat District in the Narayani Zone of south-eastern Nepal. At the time of the 1991 Nepal census it had a population of 2547 people living in 514 individual households.
