= Lakshminiya, Rautahat =

Coordinates: 27°3′N 85°12′E

Lakshminiya लक्ष्मीनिया
- Village development committee
- Nickname: Hindu Area
- Interactive map of Lakshminiya
- Country: Nepal
- Zone: Narayani Zone
- District: Rautahat District

Population (1991)
  - Total: 6,619
- Time zone: UTC+5:45 (Nepal Time)

Lakshminiya is a village development committee in Rautahat District in the Narayani Zone of south-eastern Nepal. At the time of the 1991 Nepal census it had a population of 6619 people living in 1142 individual households.
