= Debahi =

Devahi देवाही
- Village development committee
- Location in Nepal
- Coordinates: 26.91°N 85.26°E
- Country: Nepal
- Zone: Narayani Zone
- District: Rautahat District

Population (1991)
  - Total: 4,560
- Time zone: UTC+5:45 (Nepal Time)

Devahi is a village development committee in Rautahat District in the Narayani Zone of the south-eastern Nepal. At the time of the 1991 Nepal census it had a population of 4560 people living in 905 individual households. The climate of Debahi is of Monsoon-influenced humid subtropical climate.
