= Gadhi =

Village development committee in Narayani Zone, Nepal

Gadhi गढी
- Village development committee
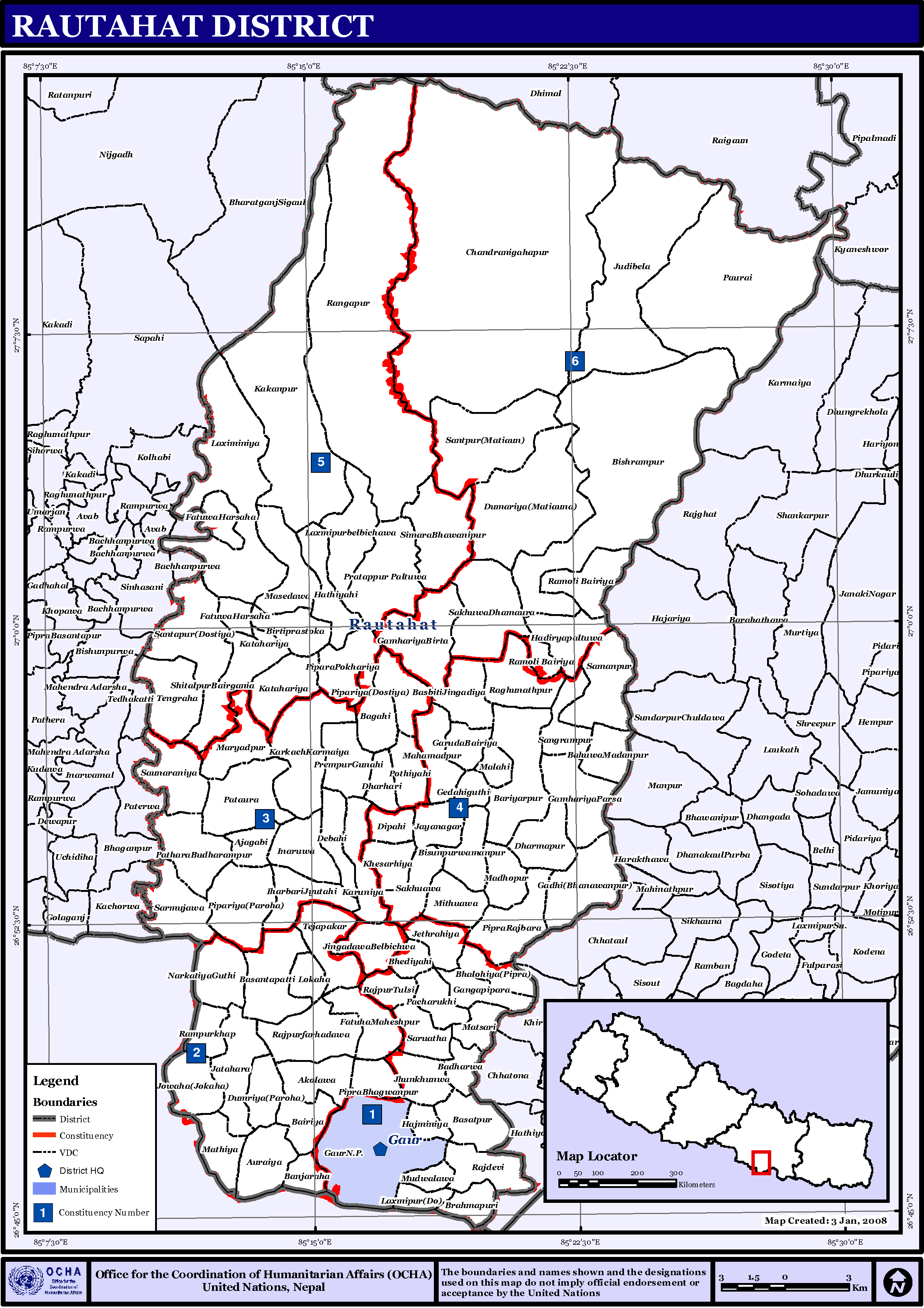

- Location in Nepal
- Country: Nepal
- Zone: Narayani Zone
- District: Rautahat District

Population (1991)
  - Total: 1,063
  - Ethnicities: Brahmin Chhetri
- Time zone: UTC+5:45 (Nepal Time)

Gadhi is a village development committee in Rautahat District in the Narayani Zone of south-eastern Nepal. At the time of the 1991 Nepal census, it had a population of 1063.
