= Jingadawa Belbichhwa =

Coordinates: 26°52′N 85°17′E

Jingadawa Belbichhwa जिङगदवा बेलबिचवा
- Village development committee
- Interactive map of Jingadawa Belbichhwa
- Country: Nepal
- Zone: Narayani Zone
- District: Rautahat District

Population (1991)
  - Total: 3,628
- Time zone: UTC+5:45 (Nepal Time)

Jingadawa Belbichhwa is a village development committee in Rautahat District in the Narayani Zone of south-eastern Nepal. At the time of the 1991 Nepal census it had a population of 3628 people living in 639 individual households.
