= Bhalohiya =

Village development committee in Narayani Zone, Nepal

Coordinates: 26°51′N 85°20′E

Bhalohiya भलोहिया
- Village development committee
- Interactive map of Bhalohiya
- Country: Nepal
- Zone: Narayani Zone
- District: Rautahat District
- Established: 1000km

Population (2011)
  - Total: 4,877
- Time zone: UTC+5:45 (Nepal Time)

Bhalohiya is a village development committee (VDC) in Rautahat District in the Narayani Zone of south-eastern Nepal. At the time of the 2011 Nepal census, it had a population of 4,877 people living in 805 individual households. Most of the people living in this village belong to the caste of Bhumihar (brahamins) called Pandey and other like sah, mahato and few thakur and jha. People are mainly involved in business, teacher and are in Nepal police. It is situated at the bank of the river Bagmati and is 13 km from Gaur and 3 km from sukdev chok. Recently, a private school called DH Academy had been established in order to provide a better facility and to improve and give quality education in VDC, so that people from this and from some other VDCs nearby should not send the children to study outside the district. A bachelor's-degree level campus, called bagmati bahumukhi campus, is in this VDC. The village is facilitated with good health facilities with some of the private clinics and a hospital. There are pitch roads connecting the different places of the village. This VDC is facilitated with drinking water. Recently, CA of rautahat 1 madav nepal proposed a project of 1 crore for building a town hall in Bhalohiya.
