= Lakshmipur Belbichhawa =

Coordinates: 26°45′N 85°19′E

Lakshmipur Belbichhawa लक्ष्मीपुर बेलबिचवा
- Village development committee
- Interactive map of Lakshmipur Belbichhawa
- Country: Nepal
- Zone: Narayani Zone
- District: Rautahat District

Population (1991)
  - Total: 2,209
- Time zone: UTC+5:45 (Nepal Time)

Lakshmipur Belbichhawa is a village development committee in Rautahat District in the Narayani Zone of south-eastern Nepal. At the time of the 1991 Nepal census it had a population of 2209 people living in 379 individual households.
