= Pothiyahi =

Village development committee in Narayani Zone, Nepal

Pothiyahi पोथियाही
- Village development committee
- Location in Nepal
- Coordinates: 26.94°N 85.30°E
- Country: Nepal
- Zone: Narayani Zone
- District: Rautahat District

Population (1991)
  - Total: 3,927
- Time zone: UTC+5:45 (Nepal Time)

Pothiyahi is a village development committee in Rautahat District in the Narayani Zone of south-eastern Nepal. At the time of the 1991 Nepal census it had a population of 3927 people living in 627 individual households.
