= Sabaila =

Village in Bihar, India

Coordinates: 25°52′N 86°49′E

Sabaila is a village in Saharsa District, Bihar, India.
