= Pipra Pokhariya =

Coordinates: 26°58′N 85°16′E

Pipra Pokhariya पिपरा पोखरिया
- Village development committee
- Interactive map of Pipra Pokhariya
- Country: Nepal
- Zone: Narayani Zone
- District: Rautahat District

Population (1991)
  - Total: 3,538
- Time zone: UTC+5:45 (Nepal Time)

Pipra Pokhariya is a village development committee in Rautahat District in the Narayani Zone of south-eastern Nepal. At the time of the 1991 Nepal census it had a population of 3538 people living in 699 individual households.
