= Baudhimai =

Baudhimai बौधीमाई
- Municipality
- Location in Nepal
- Coordinates: 27.81°N 85.20°E
- Country: Nepal
- Development Region: Central
- District: Rautahat District
- Province: Province No. 2
- Established: 2016 A.D. (2073 B.S.)

Government
  - Mayor: Pradip Kumar Yadav (CPN (US))
  - Deputy Mayor: Pramila Devi (CPN (US))

Area
  - Total: 35.34 km^{2} (13.64 sq mi)

Population (2011)
  - Total: 36,265
  - Density: 1,026/km^{2} (2,658/sq mi)
  - Religions: Hindu Muslim Christian

Languages
  - Local: Maithili, Tharu, Nepali, Bajjika, Bhojpuri
- Time zone: UTC+5:45 (NST)
- Postal Code: 44500
- Area code: 055
- Website: www.baudhimaimun.gov.np

Baudhimai (Nepali: बौधीमाई ) is a municipality in Rautahat District, a part of Province No. 2 in Nepal. It was formed in 2016 occupying current 9 sections (wards) from previous 9 former VDCs. It occupies an area of 35.34 km^{2} with a total population of 36,268.
