= Madhav Narayan =

Madhav Narayan माधव नारायण
- Municipality
- Location in Nepal
- Coordinates: 26.97°N 85.20°E
- Country: Nepal
- Development Region: Central
- District: Rautahat
- Province: Province No. 2
- Established: 2016 A.D. (2073 B.S.)

Government
  - Mayor: Abhinay Kumar Thakur
  - Deputy Mayor: Nirmala Devi Raman

Area
  - Total: 48.53 km^{2} (18.74 sq mi)

Population (2011)
  - Total: 35,175
  - Density: 724.8/km^{2} (1,877/sq mi)
  - Religions: Hindu Muslim Christian

Languages
  - Local: Maithili, Tharu, Nepali
- Time zone: UTC+5:45 (NST)
- Postal Code: 44500
- Area code: 055
- Website: www.madhavnarayanmun.gov.np

Madhav Narayan (Nepali: माधव नारायण) is a municipality in Rautahat District, a part of Province No. 2 in Nepal. It was formed in 2016 occupying current 9 sections (wards) from previous 9 former VDCs. It occupies an area of 48.53 km^{2} (18.74 sq mi) with a total population of 35,175.
