= Bagahi, Rautahat =

Coordinates: 26°59′N 85°16′E

Bagahi बगही
- Village Development Committee
- Interactive map of Bagahi
- Country: Nepal
- Zone: Narayani Zone
- District: Rautahat District

Population (1991)
  - Total: 2,217
- Time zone: UTC+5:45 (Nepal Time)

Bagahi is a Village Development Committee in Rautahat District in the Narayani Zone of south-eastern Nepal. At the time of the 1991 Nepal census it had a population of 2217 people residing in 429 individual households.
