= Paroha Municipality =

Paroha परोहा
- Municipality
- Location in Nepal
- Coordinates: 26.84°N 85.23°E
- Country: Nepal
- Development Region: Central
- Zone: Narayani
- District: Rautahat
- Province: Province No. 2
- Established: 2016 A.D. (2073 B.S.)

Government
  - Mayor: Shekh Wakil (NC)
  - Deputy Mayor: Sugandhi Giri (NC)

Area
  - Total: 37.45 km^{2} (14.46 sq mi)

Population (2011)
  - Total: 37,453
  - Density: 1,000/km^{2} (2,590/sq mi)
  - Ethnic Groups: Yadav Brahman Patel[Teli] Muslim Tharu Koche Rajbanshi Rajput
  - Religions: Hindu Muslim

Languages
  - Local: Nepali, Bajjika
- Time zone: UTC+5:45 (NST)
- Postal Code: 44500
- Area code: 055
- Website: www.parohamun.gov.np

Paroha (Nepali: परोहा) is a municipality in Rautahat District, a part of Province No. 2 in Nepal. It was formed in 2016 occupying current 9 sections (wards) from previous 9 former VDCs. Laukaha is the largest city of paroha and also headquarter of paroha municipality. It occupies an area of 37.45 km^{2} with a total population of 37,453.
