= Phatuwa Bijayapur =

Phatuha Bijaypur फतुहा बिजयपुर
- Municipality
- फतुहा बिजयपुर नगरपालिका
- Location in Nepal
- Coordinates: 27.03°N 85.20°E
- Country: Nepal
- Development Region: Central
- Province: Province No. 2
- District: Rautahat
- Established: 2016 A.D. (2073 B.S.)

Government
  - Mayor: Gopal Ray Yadav
  - Deputy Mayor: Vacant

Area
  - Total: 65.24 km^{2} (25.19 sq mi)

Population (2011)
  - Total: 36,533
  - Density: 560.0/km^{2} (1,450/sq mi)
  - Religions: Hindu Muslim Christian

Languages
  - Local: Maithili, Tharu, Nepali, Bhojpuri
- Time zone: UTC+5:45 (NST)
- Postal Code: 44500
- Area code: 055
- Website: www.phatuwabijaypurmun.gov.np

Phatuha Bijaypur (Nepali: फतुहा बिजयपुर) is a municipality in Rautahat District, a part of Province No. 2 in Nepal. It was formed in 2016 occupying current 11 sections (wards) from previous 11 former VDCs. It occupies an area of 65.24 km^{2} with a total population of 36,533.
