= Kageshwori =

Kageshwori कागेश्वरी

Religion
- Affiliation: Hinduism

Location
- Location: Kageshwori Manahara Municipality-1
- Country: Nepal

Kageshwori (Nepali: कागेश्वरी) is a religious place in Kageshwori Manahara Municipality-1, (previously Gagalphedi-7) located north-east of Kathmandu, capital city of Nepal. The god Shiva is the attraction of the believers. It is one of the 64 Shivalingas mentioned in the Linga purana. The temple was established in the Licchavi period.

Etymologically Kageshowri is combination of two words, that is 'Kag' means 'crow' and 'Ishowr' means 'God'. This means Crow is glorified here as it has religious and environmental role. "'Mahadev' is the God of Gods", believers say. Dudhe Gaun & Puwar Gaun are the nearest villages of this sacred place. This place is also known as Kageshwori Temple or Kageshwori Mahadevsthan (कागेश्वरी महादेवस्थान). One day in Bhadra Sukla Asthami (भाद्र शुक्ल अष्टमी) of each year, thousands of pilgrims come to visit this place. Golden crow is also shown at that occasion. Religious importance as well as economic activities are promoted through Haat bazar (Mela).Developing this place as the destination to international pilgrimage spot is on discussion. It is based on the lap of Shivapuri National Park in the remote bank of Kageshowri (Mahadev) river.

During the season of mela, people enjoy walking through jungle paths and tasting various recipes. Newars are the main participants; they reside in the surrounding places like; Sankhu, Bhaktapur etc. And then Tamang come from different places nearing this heritage. Basically one night staying in a group, singing songs, drinking locally made alcohol and religious chanting is of interest and entertains visitors.
