= Gujara Municipality =

Gujara गुजरा
- Municipality
- Location in Nepal
- Coordinates: 27.13°N 85.20°E
- Country: Nepal
- Development Region: Central
- District: Rautahat
- Province: Madhesh
- Established: 2016 A.D. (2073 B.S.)

Government
  - Mayor: Santa Lal Prasad Chaudhari (PSP-N)
  - Deputy Mayor: Ratna Lama (NC)

Area
  - Total: 150.33 km^{2} (58.04 sq mi)

Population (2011)
  - Total: 46,593
  - Density: 309.94/km^{2} (802.74/sq mi)
  - Religions: Hindu Muslim Christian

Languages
  - Local: Maithili, Tharu, Nepali
- Time zone: UTC+5:45 (NST)
- Postal Code: 44500
- Area code: 055
- Website: www.gujaramun.gov.np

Gujara (Nepali: गुजरा) is a municipality in Rautahat District, a part of Madhesh Province in Nepal. It was formed in 2016 occupying current 9 sections (wards) from previous 9 former VDCs.।

== Wardwise Population and Households ==
As per the 2011 population census, Gujara Municipality had a total population of 46,592, with 23,380 males and 23,212 females. Among all wards, ward number 2 had the largest population of 6,938, while ward number 1 had the least population, also reported as 6,938 (likely a data discrepancy requiring clarification).

In terms of households, Gujara Municipality had a total of 7,391 households. Ward number 2 had the highest number of households at 1,207, whereas ward number 6 had the lowest with 643 households.

== Literacy, Education Levels & Schooling ==
According to the 2011 census, there were 18,704 people in Gujara Municipality who were fully literate (able to both read and write), and 1,925 individuals who could read but not write. Literacy disaggregated by gender shows inconsistencies in the data, with the percentage values for male and female literacy not clearly defined.

Out of the total 10,357 individuals aged between 5 and 25 years, 5,489 males and 4,868 females were attending school. Conversely, out of the 9,831 people in the same age group who were not attending school, 4,449 were male and 5,382 were female. The ratio of males to females attending school was 1.13, while the ratio for those not attending school was 0.83. Additionally, 570 males and 702 females did not report their schooling status.
