= Inaruwa, Rautahat =

Inarwa इनर्वा
- Village development committee
- Location in Nepal
- Coordinates: 26.91°N 85.24°E
- Country: Nepal
- Zone: Narayani Zone
- District: Rautahat District

Population (1991)
  - Total: 2,935
- Time zone: UTC+5:45 (Nepal Time)

Inarwa is a village development committee in Rautahat District in the Narayani Zone of south-eastern Nepal. At the time of the 1991 Nepal census it had a population of 2935 people living in 598 individual households.
