= Jhunkhunwa =

Coordinates: 26°49′N 85°19′E

Jhunkhunwa झुनखुनवा
- Village development committee
- Interactive map of Jhunkhunwa
- Country: Nepal
- Zone: Narayani Zone
- District: Rautahat District

Population (1991)
  - Total: 4,336
- Time zone: UTC+5:45 (Nepal Time)

Jhunkhunwa is a village development committee in Rautahat District in the Narayani Zone of south-eastern Nepal. At the time of the 1991 Nepal census it had a population of 4,336 people living in 831 individual households.
