= Basatpur =

Place in Province Number 2, Nepal

Basatpur बसतपुर
- Place (Pride of Rautahat District, Nepal)
- Location in Nepal
- Coordinates: 26.79°N 85.32°E
- Country: Nepal
- [Province]: Province Number 2
- District: Rautahat District

Population (1991)
  - Total: 4,093
- Time zone: UTC+5:45 (Nepal Time)

Basatpur is a settlement situated on the bank of Bagamati River in Nepal. The name Basatpur is derived from the Sanskrit word vasanta or basanta, in reference to the season of Spring. This is intended to represent the "evergreen" personalities of Basatpur's residence. Basatpur was a village development committee in the Rautahat District in the Narayani Zone of south-eastern Nepal until August 2017. Currently, it is jointly divided into two wards of the Rajdevi Municipality of the Rautahat district, Province 2 of federal Nepal. At the time of the 1991 Nepal census, it had a population of 4093 people living in 922 individual households. Basatpur has the second highest population of Brahmins in the Rautahat district. The majority of Basatpur's residents consists of Nepali government officials who operate in nearly every government sector in Nepal, including various private sectors.
