= Maulapur, Rautahat =

Maulapur मौलापुर
- Municipality
- Location in Nepal
- Coordinates: 27.93°N 85.20°E
- Country: Nepal
- Development Region: Central
- District: Rautahat District
- Province: Province No. 2
- Established: 2016 A.D. (2073 B.S.)

Government
  - Mayor: Rina Kumari Sah (AJP)
  - Deputy Mayor: Vacant

Area
  - Total: 34.75 km^{2} (13.42 sq mi)

Population (2011)
  - Total: 26,431
  - Density: 760.6/km^{2} (1,970/sq mi)
  - Religions: Hindu Muslim

Languages
  - Local: [bhojpuri, Bajika, Nepali ]
- Time zone: UTC+5:45 (NST)
- Postal Code: 44500
- Area code: 055
- Website: www.maulapurmun.gov.np

Maulapur (Nepali: मौलापुर) is a municipality in Rautahat District, a part of Province No. 2 in Nepal. It was formed in 2016 occupying current 9 sections (wards) from previous 9 former VDCs. It occupies an area of 34.75 km^{2} with a total population of 26,431.
