= Rautahat District =

District of Nepal

Coordinates: 26°46′N 85°16′E

Rautahat District रौतहट जिल्ला
- District
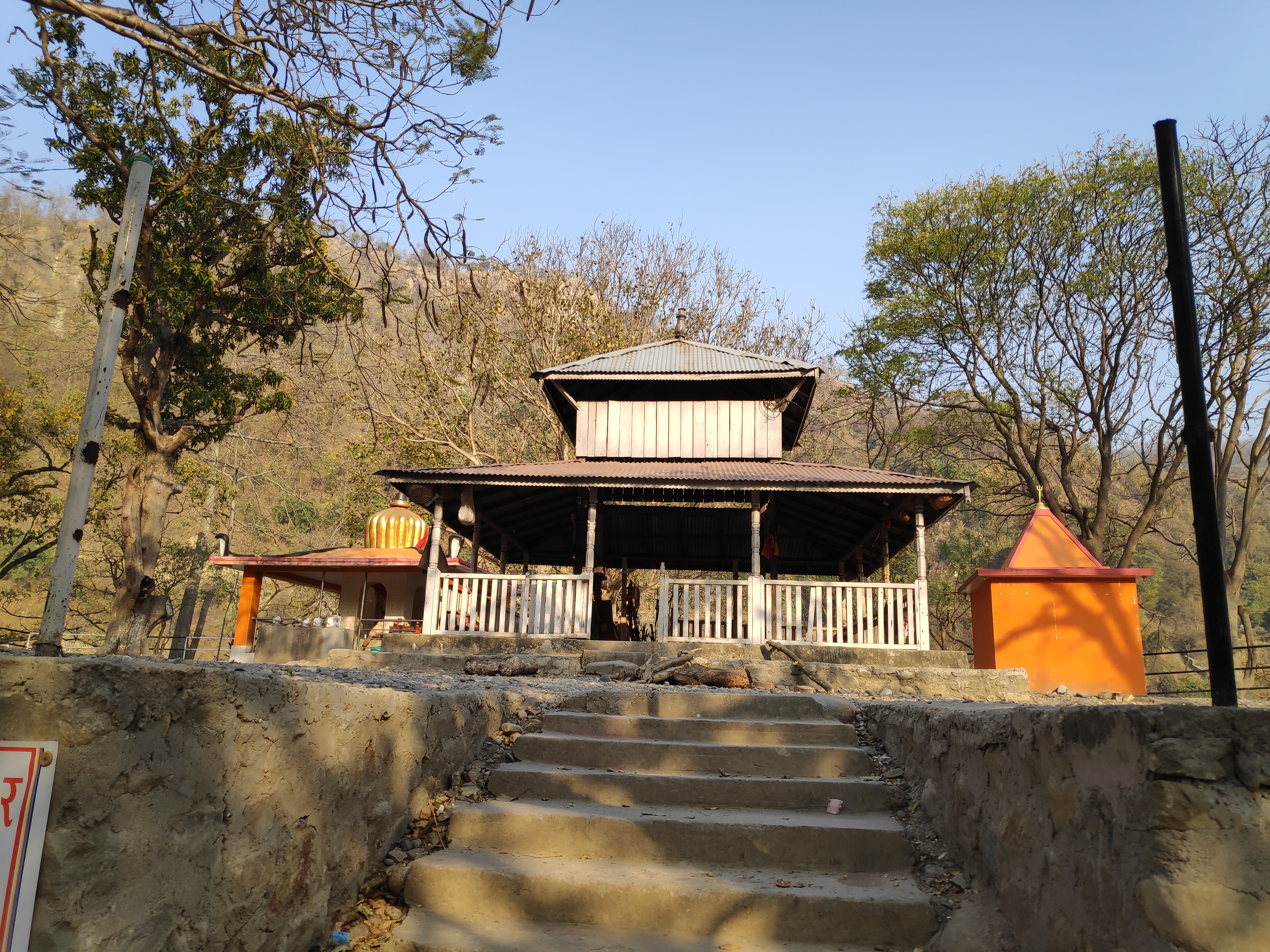
- Nunthar Shiva Mandir, Paurai

- Rautahat District (dark yellow) in Madhesh Province
- Country: Nepal
- Region: Mithila
- Province: Madhesh
- Established: During Rana regime
- Headquarter: Gaur
- Local bodies: List: Municipality: Baudhimai Municipality; Brindaban Municipality; Chandrapur Municipality; Dewahi Gonahi Municipality; Gadhimai Municipality; Garuda Municipality; Gaur Municipality; Gujara Municipality; Ishanath Municipality; Katahariya Municipality; Madhav Narayan Municipality; Maulapur Municipality; Paroha Municipality; Phatuwa Bijayapur Municipality; Rajdevi Municipality; Rajpur Municipality Rural Municipality: Durga Bhagwati Rural Municipality; Yamunamai Rural Municipality

Government
  - Type: District Coordination
  - Body: Rautahat DCC
  - Chief: Ramayodhya Ray Yadav
  - Deputy Chief: Mahesh Baitha

Area
  - Total: 1,126 km^{2} (435 sq mi)

Population (2011)
  - Total: 686,723
  - Density: 609.9/km^{2} (1,580/sq mi)

Time zone
- Kathmandu: UTC+05:45 (NPT)
- Main Languages: Bajjika, Urdu, Nēpālī
- Website: dccrautahat.gov.np

Rautahat District (Maithili: रौतहट जिल्ला), a part of Madhesh Province, is one of the seventy-seven districts of Nepal. The district headquarter is Gaur, including municipalities like Katahariya, Garuda, Chandrapur, Paroha, covers an area of 1,126 km^{2} and had a population of 545,132 in 2001 and 686,722 in 2011. This district has a total of 2 VDCs and 16 municipalities. Among other districts, Rautahat has the largest percent of Muslims in Nepal, about 22.4% (census 2021). The most densely populated village in Rautahat district, Rajpur pharhadwa(राजपुर फरहदवा), is primarily Muslim, but a majority of people in the district are Hindu. Sri Ram Sugar Mill is the only sugar mill located in Garuda municipality. The well known shiva temple located in Shivnagar, which is looked after by Sah and Jha family. The historical temple of Goddess Durga is in Matsari.Every year, the temple welcomes millions of devotees from different parts of Nepal and India as well on the occasion of Navaratri. Late Shri Gulab Narayan Jha, the first person to represent Madhesis in politics, was permanent resident of this village. There is a place called Najarpur in Chandrapur where whole village is vegetarian. They are not even allowed to buy or sell any alcoholic beverages and buying and selling of tobacco products is also prohibited.

There is a place called Katahariya which lies in Katahariya Municipality itself. It is famous for katiya meat. Katiya is an earthen pot in which mainly goat meat is cooked with the help of charcoal.

Nunthar is a famous place for picnic and there is a temple of lord shiva which is located in Paurai Bagmati, Rautahat.

Rautahat district is rich in natural resources. There are varieties of trees and varieties of medicinal herbs in the forest of Rautahat. There are dense forest with varieties of wild animals in the forest of Rautahat, including cheetahs, tigers, elephants, varieties of snakes, etc. There are also varieties of birds in the forests of Rautahat, including doves, hornbills, parrots, pigeons, cuckoos, sparrows, crows, and many more.

== Geography and Climate ==
Climate Zone	Elevation Range	% of Area
Lower Tropical	below 300 meters (1,000 ft)	94.4%
Upper Tropical	300 to 1,000 meters 1,000 to 3,300 ft.	5.6%

The Manusmara River flows through the district, and feeds a canal for irrigating 3200 hectares of land.

== Demographics ==
Historical population
Census year	Pop.	±% p.a.
1981	332,526	—
1991	414,005	+2.22%
2001	545,132	+2.79%
2011	686,722	+2.34%
2021	813,573	+1.71%
Source: Citypopulation

At the time of the 2021 Nepal census, Rautahat District had a population of 813,573. 11.97% of the population is under 5 years of age. It has a literacy rate of 57.75% and a sex ratio of 992 females per 1000 males. 761,991 (93.66%) lived in municipalities.

Ethnic groups/castes in Rautahat district (2021)
1. Muslim (22.4%)
2. Yadav (12.6%)
3. Kurmi (5.92%)
4. Teli (5.79%)
5. Kanu (4.73%)
6. Chamar (4.13%)
7. Tharu (4.06%)
8. Mallaah (3.03%)
9. Paswan (2.99%)
10. Kalwar (2.90%)
11. Tatma (2.63%)
12. Kushwaha (2.53%)
13. Other Madheshi non-Dalit (16.0%)
14. Hill Janjati (3.33%)
15. Other Madheshi Dalit (3.16%)
16. Khas non-Dalit (2.77%)
17. Others (1.03%)

Ethnicity/caste: Madheshi are the largest group, making up over 66% of the population. Muslims are the largest single community, making up over 22% of the population. There are small minorities of Khas and Hill Janjati as well as Tharus.

Religion in Rautahat District (2021)
Religion	Percent
Hinduism	75.72%
Islam	22.55%
Buddhism	1.50%
Other or not stated	0.23%

Religion: 75.8% were Hindu, 22.6% Muslim, 1.5% Buddhist and 0.2% others.

Languages of Rautahat district (2021)
1. Bajjika (72.4%)
2. Urdu (9.95%)
3. Nepali (4.07%)
4. Maithili (3.81%)
5. Tharu (3.65%)
6. Bhojpuri (3.28%)
7. Tamang (1.41%)
8. Others (1.40%)

Bajjika is the largest language. Maithili is the second-largest language. Nepali is spoken by 11% of the population. Urdu and Tharu are spoken by a small minority.

== Administration ==
The district consists of eighteen municipalities, out of which sixteen are urban municipalities and two are rural municipalities. These are as follows:

- Baudhimai Municipality
- Brindaban Municipality
- Chandrapur Municipality
- Dewahi Gonahi Municipality
- Gadhimai Municipality
- Garuda Municipality
- Gaur Municipality
- Gujara Municipality
- Ishanath Municipality
- Katahariya Municipality
- Madhav Narayan Municipality
- Maulapur Municipality
- Paroha Municipality
- Phatuwa Bijayapur Municipality
- Rajdevi Municipality
- Rajpur Municipality
- Durga Bhagwati Rural Municipality
- Yamunamai Rural Municipality

== Former Village Development Committees (VDCs) and Municipalities ==
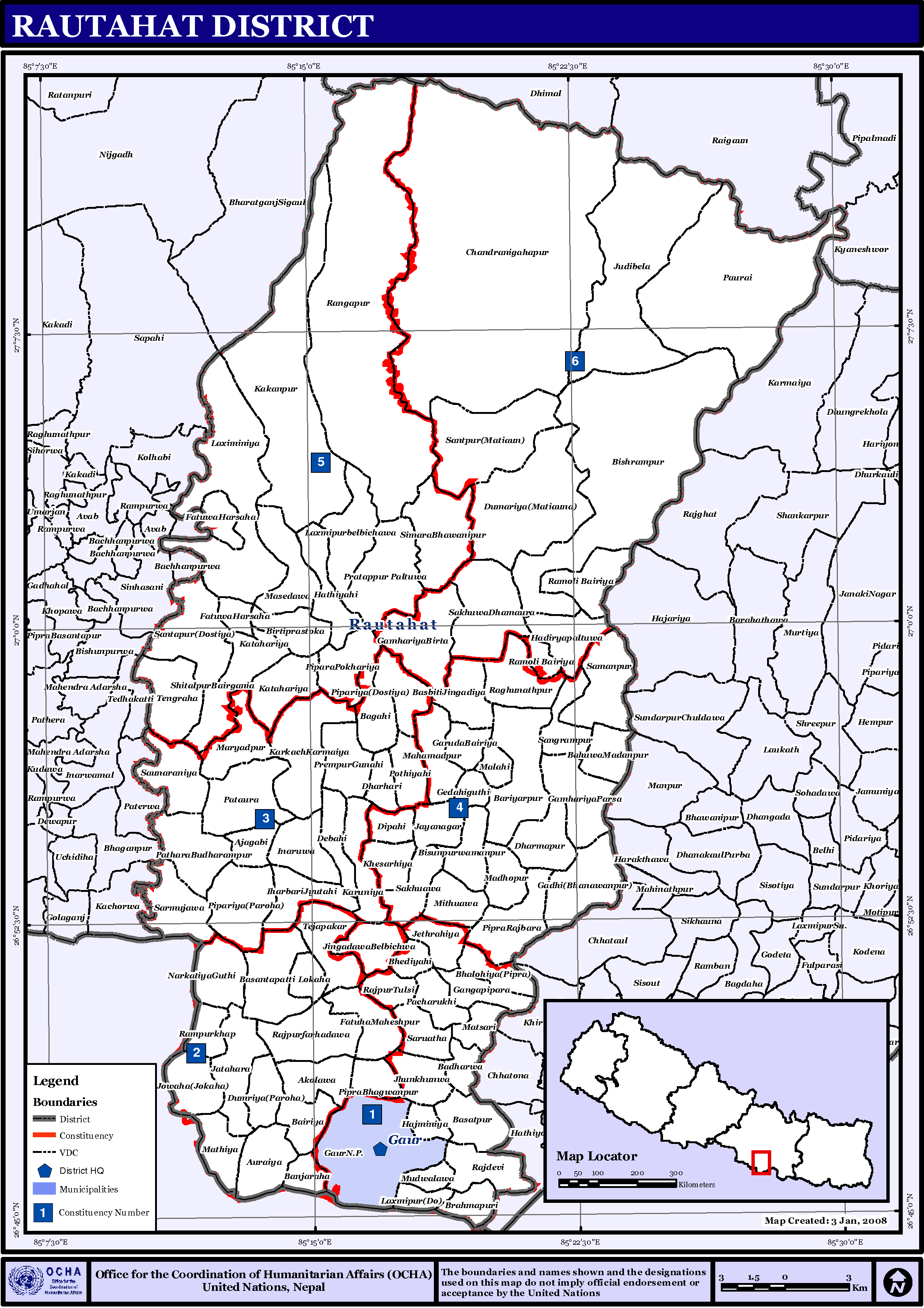
Map of the VDCs and Municipalities (blue) in Rautahat District

- Ajagaibi
- Akolawa
- Altoki
- Auraiya
- Baderwa
- Badaharwa
- Bagahi
- Bahuwa Madanpur
- Bairiya
- Banjaraha
- Bariyarpur
- Basantapatti
- Basatpur
- Basbiti Jingadiya
- Baudhimai
- Bhalohiya
- Bhasedhawa
- Bhediyahi
- Binwatole
- Birtiprastoka
- Bishrampur
- Bisunpurwa Manpur
- Brahmapuri
- Chandrapur Municipality
- Chandhiya
- Debahi
- Dharampur
- Dharhari
- Dipahi
- Dumariya Bazar, Matiaon
- Dumriyachaur
- Gadhi
- Gamhariya Birta
- Gamhariya Parsa
- Gangapipra
- Garuda Municipality
- Gaur Municipality
- Gedahiguthi
- Gunahi
- Hajminiya
- Hardiya Paltuwa
- Harsaha
- Hathiyahi
- Inarbari Jyutahi
- Inaruwa
- Jatahare
- Jayanagar
- Jethrahiya
- Jhunkhunwa
- Jingadawa Belbichhwa
- Jingadiya
- Jowaha
- Judibela
- Kanakpur
- Karkach Karmaiya
- Karuniya
- Katahariya
- Khauraha
- Khesarhiya
- Laksminiya
- Laksmipur
- Laksmipur Belbichhawa
- Lokaha
- Madanpur
- Malahi
- Maryadpur
- Mathiya
- Matsari
- Mithuawa
- Mudwalawa
- Narkatiya Guthi
- Pacharukhi
- Patahi
- Pataura
- Pathara Budharampur
- Paurai
- Phatuha Maheshpur
- Phatuha Harsaha
- Pipariya
- Pipra Bhagwanpur
- Pipra Pokhariya
- Pipra Rajbara
- Pothiyahi
- Pratappur Paltuwa
- Prempur Gunahi
- Purainawma
- Raghunathpur
- Rajdevi
- Rajpur Pharhadawa
- Rajpur Tulsi
- Ramauli Bairiya
- Rampur Khap
- Rangapur
- Sakhuwa
- Sakhuwa Dhamaura
- Samanpur
- Sangrampur
- Santapur
- Santpur
- Sarmujawa
- Saruatha
- Saunaraniya
- Sawagada
- Shitalpur Bairgania
- Simara Bhawanipur
- SrinagarKhor
- Sirsiya
- Tejapakar
- Tengraha
- Tikuliya

== Education ==
Private Schools Nepal Police School, Basbiti Jingadiya. Prabhat Secondary English Boarding School, Gaur. Terai Zone Academy Santapur, Chandrapur. Bal Niketan Higher Secondary School, Chandrapur. Moonlight Academy Boarding School, Chandrapur. Pathibhara Secondary School, Chandrapur. Mount Everest English School, Chandrapur. Namuna English Boarding School, Chapur Bazaar. Himalayan Public School, Sukdev Chowk. New Bal Memorial Academy Boarding School, SimraBhawanipur. Trishakti Academy English Boarding School Katahariya

=== Shree Juddha Campus ===
The origin of this campus goes back to its former "Shree Juddha Higher Secondary School" and further "Shree Juddha Secondary School", the third-oldest school in Nepal inaugurated by Juddha Shamsher Jang Bahadur Rana during Rana dynasty. The school got its name from his name. The institution has about 1500 students.

Shree Juddha Campus, Gaur

Shree Juddha Campus offers bachelor courses like Bachelor of Education, Bachelor of Arts, Bachelor of Commerce, etc. while its former entities "Shree Juddha Higher Secondary School" offers 10+2 courses of National Examinations Board and "Shree Juddha Secondary School" offers up to 10th class of School Leaving Certificate (Nepal).

It runs a separate school for blind students.

=== Gauri Shankar Yadav Campus ===
It offers bachelor courses like B.Ed. and 10+2 courses of National Examinations Board.

== Notable people ==
- Madhav Kumar Nepal, chairman of CPN (Unified Socialist) and former Prime Minister of Nepal
- Sunil Kumar Yadav, Nepali Congress leader and former member of Constituent Assembly
- Anil Kumar Jha, senior leader of DSP, N, former Minister of Industry and Member of House of Representatives
- Bansidhar Mishra, leader of CPN (Unified Socialist), former parliamentarian and former Ambassador of Nepal to Bangladesh
- Mohammad Aftab Alam, Nepali Congress leader and Member of House of Representatives
