= Bajjika =

Bihari language of India and Nepal

- बज्जिका
- The word "Bajjika" written in Devanagari script
- Native to: India and Nepal
- Region: Bihar of India and Terai (Madhesh Province) of Nepal
- Native speakers: c. 33 million (2013 estimate)
- Language family: Indo-European: Indo-Iranian; Indo-Aryan; Eastern; Bihari; Bajjika
- Writing system: Kaithi; Tirhuta

Language codes
- ISO 639-3: vjk
- Glottolog: bajj1234

Bajjika is a dialect of the Maithili language belonging to the Indo-Aryan language family, spoken in parts of Bihar, India and in Nepal.

== Territory and speakers ==
Bajjika is a dialect of the Maithili language spoken in the north-western part of Bihar, in a region popularly known as Tirhut. It is mainly spoken in the Sheohar, Muzaffarpur, Sitamarhi, Samastipur and Vaishali districts of Bihar. A 2013 estimate based on 2001 census data suggests that there were 20 million Bajjika speakers in Bihar.

Bajjika is also spoken by a major population in Nepal, where it has 1,133,764 speakers according to the country's 2021 census. It is the most spoken language in Rautahat, Sarlahi and Mahottari district of Madhesh Province.

== Academy ==
In a move aimed at protecting indigenous language and culture, the Bihar government has decided to set up two new academies to promote local dialects; Surjapuri and Bajjika, spoken in politically influential Seemanchal and Bajjikanchal regions of the state.

== Swadesh list ==
The Swadesh list for Bajjika, an Eastern Indo-Aryan language spoken in Bihar, India, and parts of Nepal, is a standardized vocabulary set used for linguistic comparison. Bajjika, often considered a dialect of Maithili, lacks extensive public documentation, so its Swadesh list is typically constructed by approximation, drawing from related languages like Maithili and Hindi, with adjustments for Bajjika's unique phonological and lexical features.

S.No	English	Bajjika	IPA
1	I	हम	/ɦəm/
2	You	तू	/t̪uː/
3	we	हमनी	/ɦəməniː/
4	This	ई	/iː/
6	Who	के	/keː/
7	What	का	/kɑː/
8	No	न	/nə/
9	All	सब	/səb/
10	Many	बहुत	/bəɦʊt̪/
11	One	एक	/eːk/
12	Two	दुइ	/d̪ui/
13	Big	बड़ा	/bəɽɑː/
14	Long	लम्मा	/ləmmɑː/
15	Small	छोट	/tʃʰoʈ/
16	Women	औरत	/ɔːrət̪/
17	Man	मर्द	/mərd̪/

== Films in Bajjika ==
Lakshmi Elthin Hammar Angna (2009) was the first formal feature film in Bajjika. Sajan Aiha Doli le ke subsequently followed.

== See also ==
- Bihari languages
- Tirhut
