= Gamhariya, Nepal =

Gamhariya गम्हरिया Gamhariya
- Village development committee Village development committee
- Location in Nepal
- Coordinates: 26.93°N 85.38°E
- Country: Nepal
- Zone: Narayani Zone
- District: Rautahat District

Government
  - Chairman: Phool Babu

Population (1991)
  - Total: 3,851
- Time zone: UTC+5:45 (Nepal Time)
- Postal code: 44513
- Area code: 055

Gamhariya was a village development committee in Rautahat District in the Narayani Zone of south-eastern Nepal.

Just before the 2017 Nepalese local elections, it was merged with five other village development committees—Samanpur, Sangrampur, Bahuwa Madanpur, Dharampur, and Bariyarpur—to form Gadhimai Municipality.

At the time of the 1991 Nepal census it had a population of 3851 people living in 729 individual households.

After Panchayat Kaal, the official name of this village development committee became "Gamhariya" but still not amended in some statistics data and refers it as Gamhariya Parsa.

The village development committee has nine wards. Half of Ward 1 comprises in Parsa village, rest of ward 1 and wards 2,3,4 and 5 in Gamhariya village and remaining wards 6,7,8 and 9 in Laxmipur village as sub locality.

In 2012, the estimated population of this VDC was around 5000.

== Education ==
=== Institution ===
- Madrasa Islahul Muslemeen -The eldest Islamic school of Nepal "Madrasa Islahul Muslemeen" is situated here which was founded by "Sheikh Hajee Alibaksh". Later his son "Sheikh Hajee Sujaeet"and janab Musa Miya jee Ansari Marhoom(died:1997) added some more infrastructures. The great-grand son, "Sheikh Abul Kalam Azad (Phool Babu)", of the founder of this Madrasa is currently not only the chief of this Islamic School but also chairperson of this village.

The Madrasa has around 700 students. Among them around 100 are boarders mostly from Rautahat District, Sarlahi District and Bihar (India).The curriculum of study is not only Islamic study like "Deene Taleem" but also mathematics and languages like English, Arabic, Persian, Urdu, Hindi and Nepali are taught. It is said that there is no single family in this village who don't have at least one Maulānā (Graduate of religious Institution) and also boast for highest number of Maulānā in one VDC in whole Nepal.

- Janta Primary School -The school has around 200 students and follow the curriculum of Government School of Nepal.

== Transportation ==
The village is linked with the oldest highway of Rautahat district called "Rajaiya Sadak" which still connects Rautahat District headquarters Gaur and East-West Highway terminal Chandrapur.

It is 5 km east of Garuda Municipality (fastest growing Market of Rautahat District), 3 km south of Samanpur (an old Market of Rautahat District), 20 km north of Gaur (The district's headquarters and the border with India) and 20 km south of Chandrapur. It also connects Sarlahi District via its sub locality Laxmipur over Bagmati River

It is connected with new Highway called "Gaur-Chandranigahpur Highway" through Garuda Municipality that links this Village to capital of Nepal, Kathmandu, and other major cities like Birgunj, Janakpurdham, Pokhara, Biratnagar, Nepalgunj, Bharatpur, etc.

Land transportation like Tanga, rickshaw, Jeep, bus is available to reach Garuda Municipality.

The nearest domestic airport, Simara Airport, is in Simra while nearest international airport, Nijgadh International Airport, is under construction in Nijgadh. Currently passengers use Tribhuvan International Airport located in capital of Nepal, Kathmandu, for international flights.

== Economy ==
The major economy of this VDC is farming. Sugarcane, rice, wheat, mustard, dal, etc. are the major production of this village. The other economy is the remittance from the people working mostly in Kathmandu, India and Persian Gulf countries.

There is also a market called "Gamhariya Bazar" where daily needs are available.

== Culture ==
The culture of this village has been influenced by Muslim community, as they comprise 85% of population. It is believed that Muslim community have been living here since more than 100 years.
