= Rautahat 1 =

Parliamentary constituency of Rautahat District in Nepal

- Parliamentary constituency
- Rautahat 1 in Madhesh Province
- Province: Madhesh
- District: Rautahat District
- Electorate: 110,314
- Major settlements: Gaur

Current constituency
- Created: 1991
- Party: RSP
- Member of Parliament: Rajesh Kumar Chaudhary
- Local Levels: Rajdevi Municipality; Gaur Municipality; Madhav Narayan Municipality; Yamunamai Rural Municipality; Durga Bhagwati Rural Municipality; Garuda Municipality (Ward 1); Gadhimai Municipality (Wards 6–8)

Rautahat 1 is one of four parliamentary constituencies of Rautahat District in Nepal. This constituency came into existence on the Constituency Delimitation Commission (CDC) report submitted on 31 August 2017.

== Incorporated areas ==
Rautahat 1 incorporates Rajdevi Municipality, Gaur Municipality, Madhav Narayan Municipality, Yamunamai Rural Municipality, Durga Bhagwati Rural Municipality, ward 1 of Garuda Municipality and wards 6–8 of Gadhimai Municipality.

== Assembly segments ==
It encompasses the following Province No. 2 Provincial Assembly segment

- Rautahat 1(A)
- Rautahat 1(B)

== Members of Parliament ==
=== Parliament/Constituent Assembly ===
Election	Member	Party
1991	Braj Kishor Singh	Nepali Congress
1999	Madhav Kumar Nepal	CPN (Unified Marxist–Leninist)
2008	Baban Singh	Independent
2013	Madhav Kumar Nepal	CPN (Unified Marxist–Leninist)
2017	Anil Kumar Jha	Rastriya Janata Party Nepal
April 2020	Anil Kumar Jha	People's Socialist Party, Nepal
August 2021	Anil Kumar Jha	Loktantrik Samajwadi Party, Nepal
2022	Madhav Kumar Nepal	CPN (Unified Socialist)
2026	Rajesh Kumar Chaudhary	Rastriya Swatantra Party

=== Provincial Assembly ===
==== 1(A) ====
Election	Member	Party
2017	Babulal Sah Kanu	Rastriya Janata Party Nepal
April 2020	Babulal Sah Kanu	People's Socialist Party, Nepal
August 2021	Babulal Sah Kanu	Loktantrik Samajwadi Party, Nepal

==== 1(B) ====
Election	Member	Party
2017	Yogendra Ray Yadav	Federal Socialist Forum, Nepal
May 2019	Yogendra Ray Yadav	Samajbadi Party, Nepal
April 2020	Yogendra Ray Yadav	People's Socialist Party, Nepal

== Election results ==
=== Election in the 2020s ===
==== 2026 general election ====
Candidate	Party	Votes	%
Rajesh Kumar Chaudhary	Rastriya Swatantra Party	28,946	43.87
Ajay Kumar Gupta	CPN (UML)	10,693	16.21
Anil Kumar Jha	Nepali Congress	8,574	12.99
Madhav Kumar Nepal	Nepali Communist Party	7,669	11.62
Yogendra Raya Yadav	Janata Samjbadi Party, Nepal	6,846	10.38
Devendra Mishra	Janamat Party	811	1.23
Tribhuvan Sah	Aam Janata Party	751	1.14
Sunil Prasad Kusawah	Sarvabhaum Nagarik Party	343	0.52
Sunil Prasad Kusawah	Jana Adhikar Party	341	0.52
Others		1,009	1.53
Total		65,983	100.00
Valid votes		65,983	92.73
Invalid/blank votes		5,173	7.27
Total votes		71,156	100.00
Registered voters/turnout		110,314	64.50
Majority		18,253	
Rastriya Swatantra Party gain			

==== 2022 general election ====
Candidate	Party	Votes	%
Madhav Kumar Nepal	CPN (Unified Socialist)	33,522	52.37
Ajay Kumar Gupta	CPN (UML)	26,922	42.06
Rajendra Prasad Sah	Janamat Party	1,411	2.20
Others		2,154	3.37
Total		64,009	100.00
Majority		6,600	
CPN (Unified Socialist) gain			

=== Election in the 2010s ===
==== 2017 legislative elections ====
Party	Candidate	Votes
Rastriya Janata Party Nepal	Anil Kumar Jha	21,472
Nepali Congress	Krishna Prasad Yadav	15,874
CPN (Maoist Centre)	Satya Narayan Bhagat	12,331
Independent	Baban Singh	1,669
Others		1,520
Invalid votes		3,585
Result	RJPN gain	
Source: Election Commission

==== 2017 Nepalese provincial elections ====
===== 1(A) =====
Party	Candidate	Votes
Rastriya Janata Party Nepal	Babu Lal Sah Kanu	10,524
CPN (Unified Marxist–Leninist)	Bhikhari Prasad Yadav	7,210
Nepali Congress	Nagendra Sah	7,150
Others		899
Invalid votes		1,480
Result	RJPN gain	
Source: Election Commission

===== 1(B) =====
Party	Candidate	Votes
Federal Socialist Forum, Nepal	Yogendra Ray Yadav	8,957
Nepali Congress	Rajesh Kumar Chaudhary	8,679
CPN (Maoist Centre)	Upendra Prasad Sah	7,393
Others		2,406
Invalid votes		1,321
Result	FSFN gain	
Source: Election Commission

==== 2013 Constituent Assembly election ====
Party	Candidate	Votes
CPN (Unified Marxist–Leninist)	Madhav Kumar Nepal	8,361
Madhesi Jana Adhikar Forum, Nepal (Democratic)	Ajay Kumar Gupta	8,023
Sanghiya Sadbhavana Party	Anil Kumar Jha	4,234
UCPN (Maoist)	Raj Kishor Prasad Yadav	3,642
Sadbhavana Party	Yogendra Raya Yadav	1,658
Madhesi Janaadhikar Forum, Nepal	Baban Singh	1,481
Terai Madhesh Loktantrik Party	Babu Lal Prasad Sah Kanu	1,470
Nepali Congress	Sant Lal Sah Teli	1,302
Others		3,822
Result	CPN (UML) gain	
Source: NepalNews

=== Election in the 2000s ===
==== 2008 Constituent Assembly election ====
Party	Candidate	Votes
Independent	Baban Singh	9,201
Sadbhavana Party	Ajay Gupta Baniya	6,588
Madhesi Jana Adhikar Forum, Nepal	Amar Prasad Yadav	6,434
CPN (Unified Marxist–Leninist)	Rebanta Jha	4,529
CPN (Maoist)	Indal Raya Yadav	4,490
Nepali Congress	Braj Kishor Singh	4,424
Others		3,364
Invalid votes		2,910
Result	Independent gain	
Source: Election Commission

=== Election in the 1990s ===
==== 1999 legislative elections ====
Party	Candidate	Votes
CPN (Unified Marxist–Leninist)	Madhav Kumar Nepal	22,868
Nepali Congress	Braj Kishor Singh	10,757
Independent	Parmananda Sah Teli	3,157
CPN (Marxist–Leninist)	Bishwanath Prasad Agrawal	3,058
Rastriya Prajatantra Party	Chandrika Prasad Singh	3,030
Others		1,443
Invalid Votes		1,306
Result	CPN (UML) gain	
Source: Election Commission

==== 1994 legislative elections ====
Party	Candidate	Votes
Nepali Congress	Braj Kishor Singh	14,637
Independent	Bishwanath Prasad Agrawal	13,633
Rastriya Prajatantra Party	Gunjeshwari Prasad Singh	6,698
CPN (United)	Bishnu Bahadur Manandhar	5,940
Others		1,626
Result	Congress gain	
Source: Election Commission

==== 1991 legislative elections ====
Party	Candidate	Votes
Nepali Congress	Braj Kishor Singh	12,569
CPN (Democratic)	Khajanchi Shah	8,349
Result	Congress gain	

== See also ==
- List of parliamentary constituencies of Nepal
