= Rautahat 4 =

Parliamentary constituency in Nepal

- Parliamentary constituency
- Rautahat 4 in Madhesh Province
- Province: Madhesh
- District: Rautahat District
- Population: 183,279
- Electorate: 110,314
- Major settlements: Chapur, Chandrapur, Garuda, Samanpur

Current constituency
- Created: 1991
- Party: Rastriya Swatantra Party
- Member of Parliament: Ganesh Paudel
- Municipalities: Chandrapur Municipality, Brindaban Municipality, Garuda Municipality (Wards 2–4, 8, 9), Gadhimai Municipality (Wards 1–5, 9)
- Member of the Provincial Assembly 4(A): Yubraj Bhattarai, NCP
- Member of the Provincial Assembly 4(B): Sheikh Abul Kalam Aazad, PSP-Nepal

Rautahat 4 is one of four parliamentary constituencies of Rautahat District in Nepal. This constituency came into existence on the Constituency Delimitation Commission (CDC) report submitted on 31 August 2017.

== Incorporated areas ==
Rautahat 4 incorporates Chandrapur Municipality, Brindaban Municipality, wards 2–4, 8 and 9 Garuda Municipality and wards 1–5 and 9 Gadhimai Municipality.

== Assembly segments ==
It encompasses the following Province No. 2 Provincial Assembly segment

- Rautahat 4(A)
- Rautahat 4(B)

== Members of Parliament ==
=== Parliament/Constituent Assembly ===
Election	Member	Party
1991	Dr. Bamsadhar Mishra	CPN (Unified Marxist–Leninist)
1994	Uddhav Dhakal	Nepali Congress
1999	Madhav Kumar Nepal	CPN (Unified Marxist–Leninist)
1999 by-election	Prakash Koirala	Nepali Congress
2008	Krishna Prasad Yadav	Nepali Congress
2013	Satya Narayan Bhagat	UCPN (Maoist)
May 2016	Satya Narayan Bhagat	CPN (Maoist Centre)
2017	Dev Prasad Timilsina	Nepali Congress
2022	Dev Prasad Timilsina	Nepali Congress
2026	Ganesh Paudel	Rastriya Swatantra Party

=== Provincial Assembly ===
==== 4(A) ====
Election	Member	Party
2017	Dhan Lal Thokar	Nepali Congress
2022	Yubraj Bhattarai	Communist Party of Nepal (Maoist Centre)
November 2025	Yubraj Bhattarai	Nepali Communist Party

==== 4(B) ====
Election	Member	Party
2017	Sheikh Abul Kalam Aazad	Independent
April 2018	Sheikh Abul Kalam Aazad	Federal Socialist Forum, Nepal
May 2019	Sheikh Abul Kalam Aazad	Samajbadi Party, Nepal
April 2020	Sheikh Abul Kalam Aazad	Janata Samajwadi Party
2022	Sheikh Abul Kalam Aazad	Janata Samajwadi Party

== Election results ==
=== Election in the 2020s ===
==== 2026 general election ====
Candidate	Party	Votes	%
Ganesh Paudel	Rastriya Swatantra Party	36,876	52.93
Dev Prasad Timilsena	Nepali Congress	15,865	22.77
Ram Kumar Bhattarai	Nepali Communist Party	9,778	14.04
Ramji Sah Sonar	CPN (UML)	3,478	4.99
Rajkumar Das Tatma	Janata Samjbadi Party, Nepal	1,062	1.52
Rishi Raj Dhamala	Aam Janata Party	655	0.94
Tulsiraj Giri	Ujyaalo Nepal Party	411	0.59
Ram Kalyan Raut	Janamat Party	295	0.42
Surendra Prasad Patel	Independent	279	0.40
Nawaraj Aryal	Shram Sanskriti Party	188	0.27
Rup lal Rae Yadav	Rastriya Prajatantra Party	163	0.23
Kishori Sahani	Nepal Communist Party (Maoist)	107	0.15
Others		511	0.73
Total		69,668	100.00
Valid votes		69,668	99.59
Invalid/blank votes		285	0.41
Total votes		69,953	100.00
Registered voters/turnout		110,314	63.41
Majority		21,011	
Rastriya Swatantra Party gain			

==== 2022 general election ====
Candidate	Party	Votes	%
Dev Prasad Timilsena	Nepali Congress	34,161	48.82
Udhav Prasad Regmi	CPN (UML)	26,559	37.96
Rup lal Rae Yadav	Rastriya Prajatantra Party	2,375	3.39
Ajay Kumar	Independent	2,268	3.24
Raj Narayan Sah	Rastriya Swatantra Party	1,876	2.68
Others		2,731	3.90
Total		69,970	100.00
Majority		7,602	
Nepali Congress hold			

=== Election in the 2010s ===
==== 2017 legislative elections ====
Party	Candidate	Votes
Nepali Congress	Dev Prasad Timilsena	28,228
CPN (Unified Marxist–Leninist)	Bansidhar Mishra	23,006
Rastriya Janata Party Nepal	Kanthamani Prasad Kalwar	7,881
Others		1,125
Invalid votes		3,186
Result	Congress gain	
Source: Election Commission

==== 2017 Nepalese provincial elections ====
===== 4(A) =====
Party	Candidate	Votes
Nepali Congress	Dhan Lal Thokar	13,610
CPN (Maoist Centre)	Devendra Prasad Patel	12,271
Independent	Raju Dhami	3,753
Rastriya Janata Party Nepal	Mukti Narayan Chaudhary	2,696
Others		1,337
Invalid votes		1,626
Result	Congress gain	
Source: Election Commission

===== 4(B) =====
Party	Candidate	Votes
Independent	Sheikh Abdul Kalam Aazad	7,393
Nepali Congress	Ramagya Raya	7,268
CPN (Unified Marxist–Leninist)	Nagendra Yadav	6,674
Rastriya Janata Party Nepal	Pradeep Shamsher Rana	4,840
Others		623
Invalid votes		1,337
Result	Independent gain	
Source: Election Commission

==== 2013 Constituent Assembly election ====
Party	Candidate	Votes
UCPN (Maoist)	Satya Narayan Bhagat	10,008
CPN (Unified Marxist–Leninist)	Sarala Kumari Yadav	9,812
Nepali Congress	Krishna Prasad Yadav	7,885
Rastriya Madhesh Samajwadi Party	Pradeep Shamsher Rana	5,760
Madhesi Jana Adhikar Forum, Nepal	Ram Niwas Raya Yadav	1,720
Sanghiya Sadbhavana Party	Hari Narayan Sahani	1,036
Others		4,250
Result	Maoist gain	
Source: NepalNews

=== Election in the 2000s ===
==== 2008 Constituent Assembly election ====
Party	Candidate	Votes
Nepali Congress	Krishna Prasad Yadav	9,997
CPN (Maoist)	Satya Narayan Bhagat	8,916
Madhesi Jana Adhikar Forum, Nepal	Jaynath Raya Yadav	8,087
Terai Madhesh Loktantrik Party	Hari Narayan Sahani	6,739
CPN (Unified Marxist–Leninist)	Dr. Bamsadhar Mishra	5,526
Others		3,282
Invalid votes		2,994
Result	Congress hold	
Source: Election Commission

=== Election in the 1990s ===
==== 1999 by-elections ====
Candidate	Party	Votes	%
Prakash Koirala	Nepali Congress	34,978	61.46
Ram Kumar Bhattarai	CPN (UML)	18,639	32.75
Tulsiraj Giri	CPN (ML)	958	1.68
Sarita Giri	Nepal Sadbhawana Party	943	1.66
Subaschandra Kalwar	Nepali Janata Dal	717	1.26
Gulten Raya Yadav	CPN (United)	323	0.57
Haisalal Chandrabanshi	Rastriya Prajatantra Party	82	0.14
Laxman Singh Khadka	Independent	77	0.14
Awadhalarka Raya	Independent	41	0.07
Anantraraj Paudel	Independent	33	0.06
Bidur Chalise	Independent	30	0.05
Thagendra Koirala	Independent	23	0.04
Ballabh Upadhyaya	Independent	21	0.04
Tej Bahadur Devkota	Independent	17	0.03
Hari Narayan Shah	Independent	17	0.03
Purushottam Mishra	Independent	16	0.03
Total		56,915	100.00
Majority		16,339	
Nepali Congress gain			

==== 1999 legislative elections ====
Party	Candidate	Votes
CPN (Unified Marxist–Leninist)	Madhav Kumar Nepal	26,758
Nepali Congress	Uddhav Dhakal	19,125
Nepal Sadbhawana Party	Yugal Kishor Chaudhary	3,519
CPN (Marxist–Leninist)	Rajdev Prasad Chaudhary	2,107
Others		486
Invalid Votes		2,000
Result	CPN (UML) gain	
Source: Election Commission

==== 1994 legislative elections ====
Party	Candidate	Votes
Nepali Congress	Uddhav Dhakal	20,482
CPN (Unified Marxist–Leninist)	Bansidhar Mishra	17,949
Rastriya Prajatantra Party	Raj Dev Chaudhary	3,942
Nepal Sadbhawana Party	Bishnu Narayan Chaudhary	2,425
Independent	Govinda Prasad Upadhyaya	354
Result	Congress gain	
Source: Election Commission

==== 1991 legislative elections ====
Party	Candidate	Votes
CPN (Unified Marxist–Leninist)	Bansidhar Mishra	12,665
Nepali Congress	Uddhav Dhakal	12,630
Result	CPN (UML) gain	

== See also ==
- List of parliamentary constituencies of Nepal
