= Gadhimai =

Gadhimai may refer to:

- Gadhimai, Rautahat, a municipality in Rautahat district, Nepal
- Gadhimai, Bara, former municipality and currently a part of Jitpur Simara Sub-metropolitan city, Bara District, Nepal
- Gadhimai Temple, a Hindu temple in Bara District, Nepal
- Gadhimai festival, a controversial Hindu festival in Nepal
