= Rajesh Kumar Chaudhary =

Nepalese politician

Honourable Rajesh Kumar Chaudhary
- राजेश कुमार चौधरी

Member of Parliament, Pratinidhi Sabha
- Incumbent
- Assumed office 26 March 2026
- Preceded by: Madhav Kumar Nepal
- Constituency: Rautahat 1

Personal details
- Born: 20 August 1971 (age 55) Durga Bhagwati, Rautahat, Nepal
- Citizenship: Nepalese
- Party: Rastriya Swatantra Party (2025 – present)
- Other political affiliations: Nepali Congress
- Children: 2
- Parents: Sitaram Sah (father); Pramila Devi (mother)
- Profession: Politician

Rajesh Kumar Chaudhary (Nepali: राजेश कुमार चौधरी) is a Nepalese politician and currently serves as a member of parliament for the Rastriya Swatantra Party. He is a member of the 7th Pratinidhi Sabha, elected from the Rautahat 1 constituency in the 2026 Nepalese General Election, securing 28,946 votes and defeating Ajay Kumar Gupta of the CPN (UML) and Madhav Kumar Nepal, the former Prime Minister and coordinator of the Nepali Communist Party.

== Early and personal life ==
Chaudhary was born in Durga Bhagwati, Rautahat on August 20, 1971. He was born to Sitaram Sah and Pramila Devi. He completed his higher education, an intermediate degree.

== Politics ==
He contested the 2017 Nepalese provincial elections from Rautahat 1(B) constituency as a Nepali Congress candidate but lost to Yogendra Rae Yadav of Federal Socialist Forum, Nepal. He received 8,679 votes and lost by a margin of 278 votes. He ran again in the 2022 Nepalese provincial elections from Rautahat 1(B) as an independent candidate but lost to Krishna Prasad Yadav, current chief minister of Madhesh Province of the Nepali Congress.

After the Nepalese Gen Z protests, he joined the Rastriya Swatantra Party in 2025. He secured a party ticket to contest the 2026 Nepalese general election from Rautahat 1 and won the election by receiving 28,946 votes, with a margin of 18,253 votes. He defeated a heavyweight politician, Madhav Kumar Nepal, who was elected Prime Minister of Nepal in 2009.

== Electoral performance ==
Election	Year	Constituency	Contested for	Political party	Result	Votes	% of votes	Ref.
Nepal general election	2026	Rautahat 1	Pratinidhi Sabha member	Rastriya Swatantra Party	Won	28,946	43.87%	
Nepal provincial election	2022	Rautahat 1(B)	Pradesh Sabha member	Independent politician	Lost	11,400	34.30%	
Nepal provincial election	2017	Rautahat 1(B)	Pradesh Sabha member	Nepali Congress	Lost	8,679	31.63%	
