= Bariyarpur =

Bariyarpur may refer to:

- Bariyarpur, Bara, Nepal
- Bariyarpur, Rautahat, Nepal
