= Madhav Kumar Nepal =

Former Prime Minister of Nepal

- माधवकुमार नेपाल
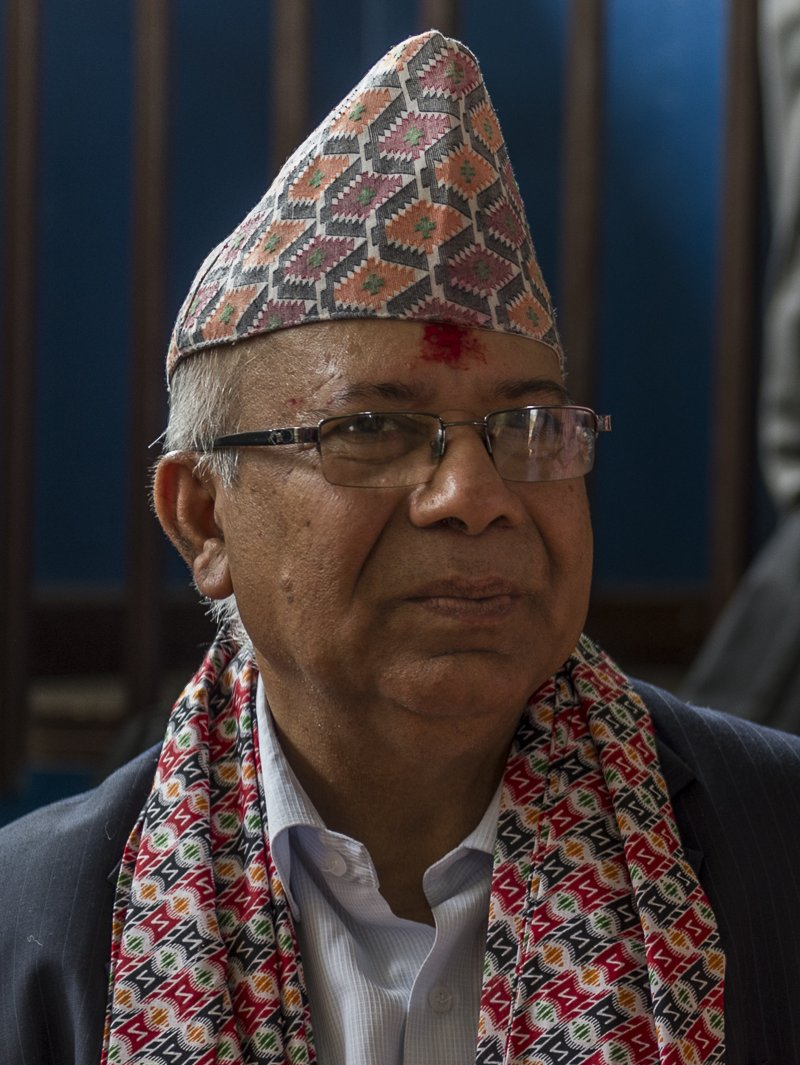
- Nepal in 2022

Prime Minister of Nepal
- In office 25 May 2009 – 6 February 2011
- President: Ram Baran Yadav
- Deputy: Bijay Kumar Gachhadar; Sujata Koirala
- Preceded by: Pushpa Kamal Dahal
- Succeeded by: Jhala Nath Khanal

Leader of the Opposition
- In office 31 May 1999 – 22 May 2002
- Prime Minister: Krishna Prasad Bhattarai; Girija Prasad Koirala; Sher Bahadur Deuba
- Preceded by: Bam Dev Gautam
- Succeeded by: Girija Prasad Koirala (2008)

Co-coordinator of the Nepali Communist Party
- Incumbent
- Assumed office 5 November 2025
- Coordinator: Pushpa Kamal Dahal
- Preceded by: Party founded

Chairman of CPN (Unified Socialist)
- In office 18 August 2021 – 4 November 2025
- Preceded by: Party founded
- Succeeded by: Merged into Nepali Communist Party

General Secretary of CPN (UML)
- In office 16 May 1993 – 12 April 2008
- Preceded by: Madan Bhandari (Note: Nepal succeeded Man Mohan Adhikari as party leader upon Adhikari’s death on 26 April 1999.)
- Succeeded by: Jhala Nath Khanal

Deputy Prime Minister of Nepal
- In office 30 November 1994 – 12 September 1995
- Monarch: Birendra
- Prime Minister: Man Mohan Adhikari
- Preceded by: Kirti Nidhi Bista (1969) (Note: This position was vacant from 7 April 1969 until 30 November 1994.)
- Succeeded by: Bam Dev Gautam (1997) (Note: There was no deputy prime minister from 12 September 1995 until 12 March 1997.)

Minister of Foreign Affairs
- In office 30 November 1994 – 12 September 1995
- Monarch: Birendra
- Prime Minister: Man Mohan Adhikari
- Preceded by: Girija Prasad Koirala
- Succeeded by: Prakash Chandra Lohani

Minister of Defence
- In office 30 November 1994 – 12 September 1995
- Monarch: Birendra
- Prime Minister: Man Mohan Adhikari
- Preceded by: Girija Prasad Koirala
- Succeeded by: Sher Bahadur Deuba

Member of the House of Representatives
- In office 22 December 2022 – 12 September 2025
- Preceded by: Anil Kumar Jha
- Succeeded by: Rajesh Kumar Chaudhary
- Constituency: Rautahat 1
- In office 4 March 2018 – 18 September 2022
- Preceded by: Deepak Prasad Kuikel (as Member of the Constituent Assembly)
- Succeeded by: Sobita Gautam
- Constituency: Kathmandu 2
- In office 28 April 2006 – 16 January 2008
- Preceded by: Himself (2006)
- Succeeded by: Baban Singh (as Member of the Constituent Assembly)
- Constituency: Rautahat 1
- In office 23 June 1999 – 22 May 2002
- Preceded by: Braj Kishor Singh
- Succeeded by: Himself (2002)
- Constituency: Rautahat 1

Member of the Constituent Assembly / Legislature Parliament
- In office 21 January 2014 – 14 October 2017
- Preceded by: Baban Singh
- Succeeded by: Anil Kumar Jha (as Member of Parliament)
- Constituency: Rautahat 1
- In office 28 May 2008 – 28 May 2012
- Constituency: Nominated by CPN (UML)

Member of the National Assembly
- In office 26 June 1991 – 27 June 1999

Personal details
- Born: 6 March 1953 (age 73) Gaur, Nepal
- Party: Nepali Communist Party (2025-present)
- Other political affiliations: CPN (Unified Socialist) (2021-2025); CPN (UML) (until 2018; 2021); Nepal Communist Party (2018-2021)
- Education: Tribhuvan University
- Website: Official website

Madhav Kumar Nepal (Nepali: माधवकुमार नेपाल, [madʱʌbˈkumar neˈpal]; born 6 March 1953) is a Nepalese politician and former Prime Minister of Nepal. He served as prime minister from 25 May 2009 to 6 February 2011.

He previously served as the Deputy Prime Minister along with the charges of important ministries like Foreign Affairs and Defence in the cabinet of Man Mohan Adhikari. He was previously the executive General Secretary of Communist Party of Nepal (Unified Marxist-Leninist) for 15 years.

Since 18 August 2021, he has been serving as the joint coordinator of the Nepali Communist Party, a new party formed through merger of eight different communist parties and splinter groups. Madhav Kumar Nepal has received the Title Honor "Patron of Humanity" award from World Humanitarian Drive(WHD)

== Early life ==
Madhav Kumar Nepal was born into a Brahmin family to Mangal Kumar and Durgadevi Upadhaya. He graduated in commerce from Tribhuvan University in 1973 and worked in banking and civil service before turning to full-time politics. He has two brothers, Binod Kumar Upadhyaya and Saroj Kumar Upadhyaya and three sisters, Kalika Bhandari, Indira Neupane and Basudha Pokharel.

== Political career ==
=== Early political activism ===
Nepal joined the communist movement in 1969 (2026 B.S.). During the underground struggle, he used party names such as 'Subodh', 'Sunil', 'Ranjan' and 'Bibek'. In 1971, he became a district committee member of the Nepal Revolutionary Organisation (Marxist-Leninist). At a conference held in Biratnagar June 7–8, 1975, Nepal was elected as a bureau member of the All Nepal Communist Revolutionary Coordination Committee (Marxist-Leninist). When the ANCRCC (ML) founded the Communist Party of Nepal (Marxist-Leninist) in 1978, Nepal was elected a politburo member of the new party.

=== Multi-party democracy (1991–2006) ===
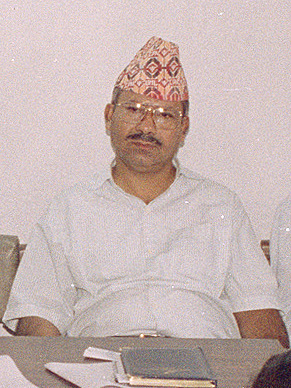
Nepal at a UML parliamentary party meeting in 1996

He was the Deputy Prime Minister in the CPN (UML) minority government in 1994–1995 as well as the leader of the opposition in the National Assembly during the 1990s. He argued for the Nepal Civil War to be solved through talks and did not believe that mobilization of the army was the solution and as the leader of CPN (UML), was one of the three key Nepali leaders, the other two being prime minister Girija Prasad Koirala and rebel Maoist leader Pushpa Kamal Dahal 'Prachanda', crucial in bringing the Maoists into the peace process and signing the 12 point peace accords that ended the decade long war.

Nepal was arrested in 2001 during a crackdown on anti-government protest. Following the palace massacre he called for Prime Minister Girija Prasad Koirala to step down, though later joined forces with him to launch a campaign against King Gyanendra's assumption of executive powers.

=== Transition period ===
On 12 April 2008, Nepal resigned as General Secretary of the CPN (UML), after having lost the Kathmandu 2 seat to Maoist candidate Jhakku Prasad Subedi in the 2008 Constituent Assembly election. Subedi was a comparatively obscure candidate. Nepal was also defeated in Rautahat-6 constituency by Maoist candidate Devendra Patel. He later won both Kathmandu 2 and Rautahat 1 seats in the Second Constituent Assembly election of 2013. Nepal later chose Rautahat 1. He won the Kathmandu 2 constituency again in the 2017 general election by a margin of 14,000 votes.

In June 2008, the CPN (UML) proposed that Nepal become the country's first President, following the declaration of a republic, though the idea did not materialise after disagreement with the ruling Unified Communist Party of Nepal (Maoist).

=== Prime Minister of Nepal ===
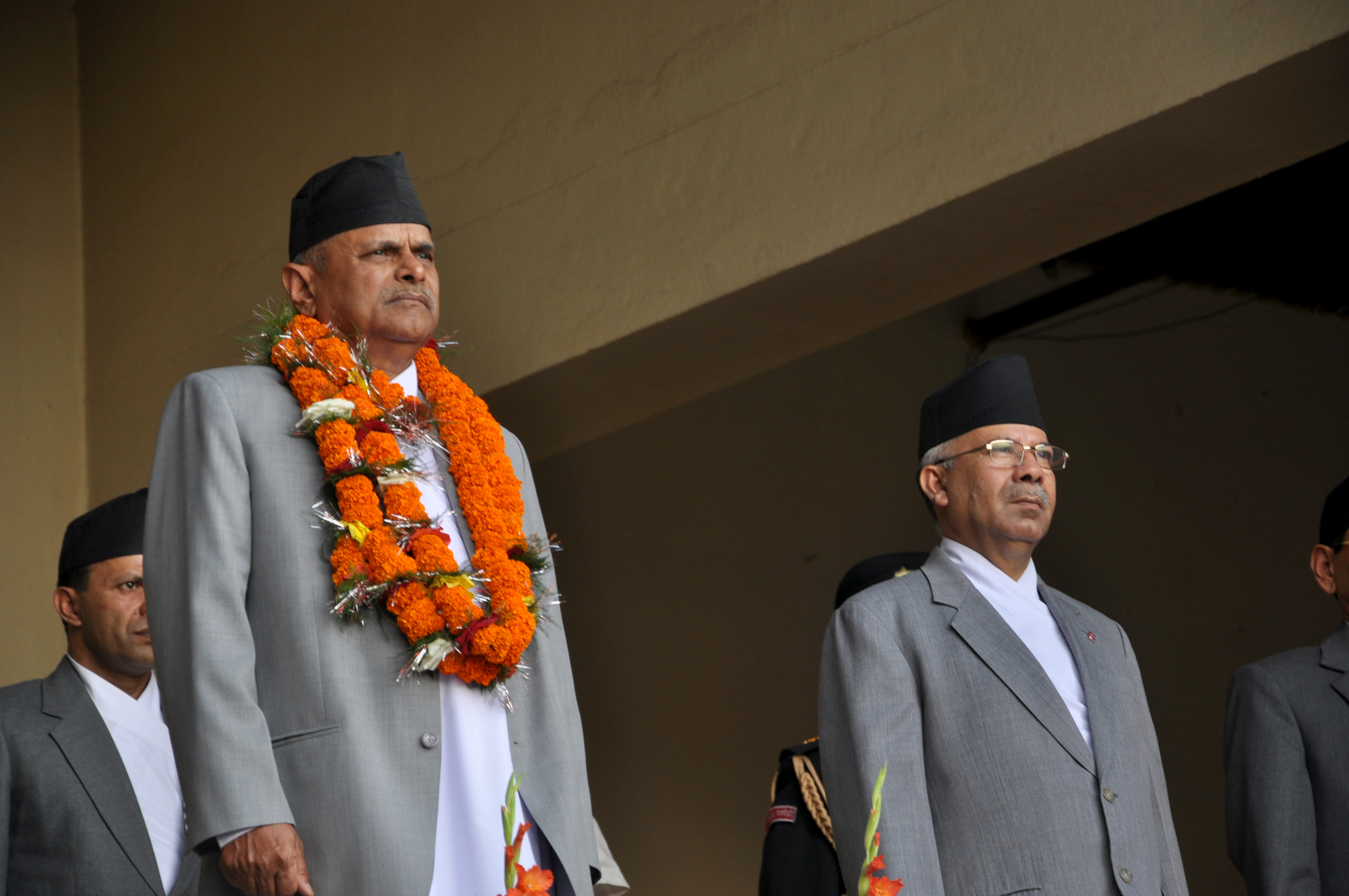
Nepal with President Ram Baran Yadav

He became the 34th Prime Minister of Nepal on 25 May 2009 after his predecessor Prachanda resigned over a conflict with the president over the dismissal of the army's chief of staff.

Nepal himself resigned as prime minister on 30 June 2010 in an effort to help the government move past its deadlock and to pave the way for a national consensus government, as demanded by the opposition.

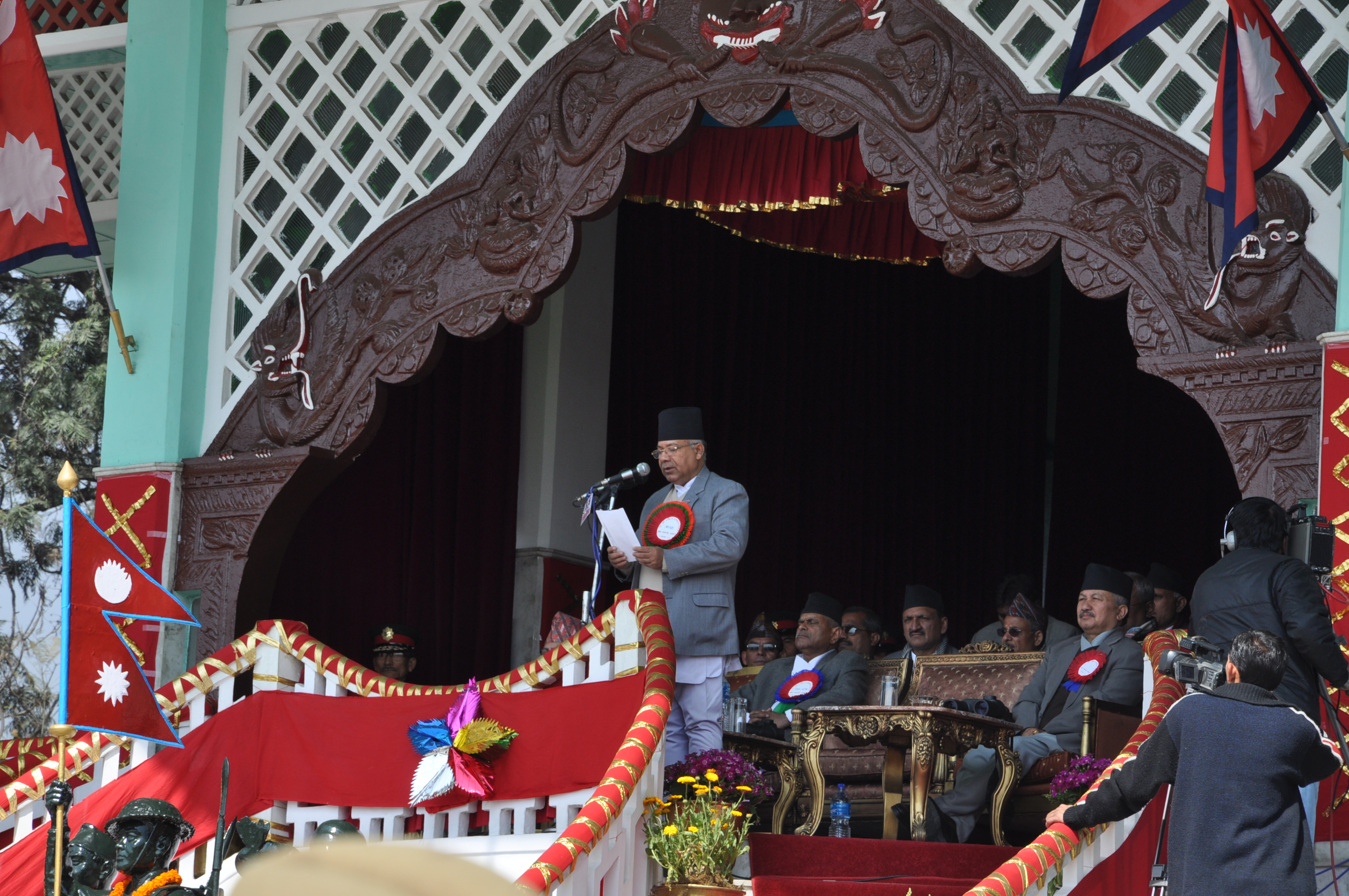
Prime Minister Nepal delivering a speech at Tundikhel the occasion of Democracy Day.

=== Split in Nepal Communist Party and CPN (UML) ===
Nepal returned to CPN (UML) after the Supreme court decision to dissolve the party merger between CPN (UML) and CPN (Maoist Centre). Since 18 August 2021, he has been serving as the chairman of the CPN (Unified-Socialist), a new party formed through split in CPN (UML) citing arrogance and monopoly of the party president KP Sharma Oli.

=== Major Political offices held ===
- 1990: Member, Constitution Drafting Commission
- 1991-1999: Member of the National Assembly
- 1991-1994: Leader of Opposition, National Assembly
- 1993-2008: General Secretary of the Communist Party of Nepal (UML)
- 1994-1995: Deputy Prime Minister, Minister of Defence and Minister of Foreign Affairs
- 1999-2002: Member of the House of Representatives from Rautahat-1
- 1999-2002: Leader of the Opposition, House of Representatives
- 2008-2013: Member of the Constituent Assembly from CPN (UML) party list
- 2009-2011: Prime Minister of Nepal
- 2013-2017: Member of the Legislative Parliament from Kathmandu-2
- 2017–2021: Member of the House of Representatives from Kathmandu-2

== Personal life ==
He is married to Gayatri Acharya. He has a son and a daughter, Saurav and Suman Nepal. There have been widespread rumorous claims that he adopted Christianity as his new faith and has been promoting conversion of Hindus to Christianity. However, he publicly and categorically denied any link with Christianity or having any role in expanding the activity of Christian missionaries in his country.

== Patanjali land-scam case (2025) ==
In June 2025, Nepal's anti-corruption agency, the Commission for the Investigation of Abuse of Authority (CIAA), filed a corruption case against former Prime Minister Madhav Kumar Nepal and 92 others for approving illegal land acquisition by Patanjali Yogpeeth Nepal.

The CIAA accused Nepal's Cabinet of unlawfully approving 815 ropani of land in Kavrepalanchok to Patanjali during his tenure in 2010, exceeding legal limits, and later enabling commercial resale at inflated prices. The alleged scam caused a loss of over NPR 185 million to the state.

National and international media widely reported on the case. Indian outlets like The Indian Express and ANI News also covered the charges filed at Nepal's Special Court in Kathmandu.

Nepal has denied any wrongdoing and termed the charges politically motivated. Patanjali Yogpeeth and his party, CPN (Unified Socialist), also released statements defending the legality of the land transaction.

== Electoral history ==
=== 2022 legislative elections ===
Nepal contested in 2022 election from Rautahat. He faced Ajay Kumar Gupta of CPN(UML) who previously lost as mayor of Gaur Municipality in the 2022 Nepalese local elections.

Rautahat 1
Party	Candidate	Votes
Communist Party of Nepal (Unified Socialist)	Madhav Kumar Nepal	33522
CPN (Unified Marxist–Leninist)	Ajay Kumar Gupta	26922
Others		1691
Invalid votes		
Result	CPN (US) gain	
Source: eKantipur.com

=== 2017 legislative elections ===
Kathmandu 2
Party	Candidate	Votes
CPN (Unified Marxist–Leninist)	Madhav Kumar Nepal	27,366
Nepali Congress	Dipak Prasad Kuikel	14,903
Bibeksheel Sajha Party	Surya Raj Acharya	7,437
Others		1,549
Invalid votes		1,790
Result	CPN (UML) gain	
Source: Election Commission

=== 2013 Constituent Assembly election ===
Rautahat 1
Party	Candidate	Votes
CPN (Unified Marxist–Leninist)	Madhav Kumar Nepal	8,361
Madhesi Jana Adhikar Forum, Nepal (Democratic)	Ajay Kumar Gupta	8,023
Sanghiya Sadbhavana Party	Anil Kumar Jha	4,234
UCPN (Maoist)	Raj Kishor Prasad Yadav	3,642
Sadbhavana Party	Yogendra Raya Yadav	1,658
Madhesi Janaadhikar Forum, Nepal	Baban Singh	1,481
Terai Madhesh Loktantrik Party	Babu Lal Prasad Sah Kanu	1,470
Nepali Congress	Sant Lal Sah Teli	1,302
Others		3,822
Result	CPN (UML) gain	
Source: NepalNews

Kathmandu 2
Party	Candidate	Votes
CPN (Unified Marxist–Leninist)	Madhav Kumar Nepal	21,747
Nepali Congress	Praitma Gautam	12,479
UCPN (Maoist)	Lila Mani Pokharel	7,134
Rastriya Prajatantra Party Nepal	Nawa Raj Simkhada	5,358
Others		2,680
Result	CPN (UML) gain	
Source: Election Commission

=== 2008 Constituent Assembly election ===
Kathmandu 2
Party	Candidate	Votes
CPN (Maoist)	Jhakku Prasad Subedi	13,858
CPN (Unified Marxist–Leninist)	Madhav Kumar Nepal	12,325
Nepali Congress	Deepak Prasad Kuikel	11,544
Rastriya Prajatantra Party	Deepak Meyar Shrestha	1,570
Rastriya Prajatantra Party Nepal	Nawa Raj Simkhada	1,569
Others		2,212
Invalid votes		1,836
Result	CPN (Maoist) gain	
Source: Election Commission

=== 1999 legislative elections ===
Rautahat 1
Party	Candidate	Votes
CPN (Unified Marxist–Leninist)	Madhav Kumar Nepal	22,868
Nepali Congress	Braj Kishor Singh	10,757
Independent	Parmananda Sah Teli	3,157
CPN (Marxist–Leninist)	Bishwanath Prasad Agrawal	3,058
Rastriya Prajatantra Party	Chandrika Prasad Singh	3,030
Others		1,443
Invalid Votes		1,306
Result	CPN (UML) gain	
Source: Election Commission

Rautahat 4
Party	Candidate	Votes
CPN (Unified Marxist–Leninist)	Madhav Kumar Nepal	26,758
Nepali Congress	Uddhav Dhakal	19,125
Nepal Sadbhawana Party	Yugal Kishor Chaudhary	3,519
CPN (Marxist–Leninist)	Rajdev Prasad Chaudhary	2,107
Others		486
Invalid Votes		2,000
Result	CPN (UML) gain	
Source: Election Commission

== See also ==
- 2021 split in Nepal Communist Party
- 2021 split in Communist Party of Nepal (Unified Marxist-Leninist)

== Notes ==
Party political offices
Preceded by Madan Bhandari	General Secretary of the Communist Party of Nepal (UML); 1993–2008	Succeeded by Jhala Nath Khanal
Political offices
Preceded by Pushpa Kamal Dahal	Prime Minister of Nepal; 2009–2011	Succeeded by Jhala Nath Khanal
