= Ganesh Paudel =

Nepalese politician

The Honourable Ganesh Paudel
- गणेश पौडेल

Member of Parliament, Pratinidhi Sabha
- Incumbent
- Assumed office 26 March 2026
- Preceded by: Dev Prasad Timilsena
- Constituency: Rautahat 4

Personal details
- Citizenship: Nepalese
- Party: Rastriya Swatantra Party
- Education: Master of Rural Development
- Profession: Politician

Ganesh Paudel (Nepali: गणेश पौडेल) is a Nepalese politician serving as a member of parliament from the Rastriya Swatantra Party. He is the member of the 7th Pratinidhi Sabha elected from Rautahat 4 constituency in 2026 Nepalese General Election securing 36,876 votes and defeating his closest contender Dev Prasad Timalsina of the Nepali Congress. He holds Master of Rural Development.

== Electoral performance ==
Election	Year	Constituency	Contested for	Political party	Result	Votes	% of votes	Ref.
Nepal general election	2026	Rautahat 4	Pratinidhi Sabha member	Rastriya Swatantra Party	Won	36,876	53.85%	

=== Black ink incident ===
On 23 July 2026, Paudel was splashed with black ink by a group of unidentified individuals while he was on a public program in Gadhimai, Rautahat. The incident was reported to police. The Himalayan Times reported that the individuals were carrying pamphlets associated with the "Madhesh Mukti Abhiyan".

On 30 July, police arrested two people in connection with the incident and said that further investigation was underway.
