= Bansidhar Mishra =

Nepali politician

- वंशीधर मिश्र

Member of the House of Representatives
- In office 1994–1991
- Monarch: Birendra of Nepal
- Prime Minister: Girija Prasad Koirala
- Preceded by: Constituency created
- Succeeded by: Uddhav Dhakal
- Constituency: Rautahat–4
- In office 1999–2004
- Monarch: Birendra of Nepal
- Prime Minister: Krishna Prasad Bhattarai
- Constituency: Rautahat 3

Member of Constituent Assembly
- In office 2008–2017
- President: Ram Baran Yadav

Ambassador of Nepal to Bangladesh
- In office September 2019 – October 2021
- Preceded by: Dr. Chop Lal Bhusal
- Constituency: Proportional list

Personal details
- Born: Rautahat, Nepal
- Party: CPN (Unified Socialist)

Bansidhar Mishra (Nepali/Maithili:वंशीधर मिश्र) is a Nepali politician of CPN (Unified Socialist). He is also a member of the standing committee of the party. He was a member of the House of Representatives from Rautahat-4 and Rautahat-3.

Mishra has been the Nepalese Ambassador to Bangladesh.

== Electoral history ==
=== 2017 legislative elections ===
Rautahat 4
Party	Candidate	Votes
Nepali Congress	Dev Prasad Timilsina	28,228
CPN (Unified Marxist–Leninist)	Bansidhar Mishra	23,006
Rastriya Janata Party Nepal	Kanthamani Prasad Kalwar	7,881
Others		1,125
Invalid votes		3,186
Result	Congress gain	
Source: Election Commission

=== 1999 legislative elections ===
Rautahat 3
Party	Candidate	Votes
CPN (Unified Marxist–Leninist)	Bansidhar Mishra	17,391
Nepali Congress	Harihar Prasad Yadav	13,899
Independent	Govinda Chaudhary	13,207
CPN (Marxist–Leninist)	Rajdev Prasad Chaudhary	3,563
Others		2,660
Invalid Votes		2,255
Result	CPN (UML) gain	
Source: Election Commission

=== 1994 legislative elections ===
Rautahat 4
Party	Candidate	Votes
Nepali Congress	Uddhav Dhakal	20,482
CPN (Unified Marxist–Leninist)	Bansidhar Mishra	17,949
Rastriya Prajatantra Party	Raj Dev Chaudhary	3,942
Nepal Sadbhawana Party	Bishnu Narayan Chaudhary	2,425
Independent	Govinda Prasad Upadhyaya	354
Result	Congress gain	
Source: Election Commission

=== 1991 legislative elections ===
Rautahat 4
Party	Candidate	Votes
CPN (Unified Marxist–Leninist)	Bansidhar Mishra	12,665
Nepali Congress	Uddhav Dhakal	12,630
Result	CPN (UML) gain	

== See also ==
- CPN (Unified Socialist)
- Ram Chandra Jha
- Satrudhan Mahato
- Pramod Kumar Yadav
