= Gadhimai Temple =

Hindu temple in Bara District, Nepal

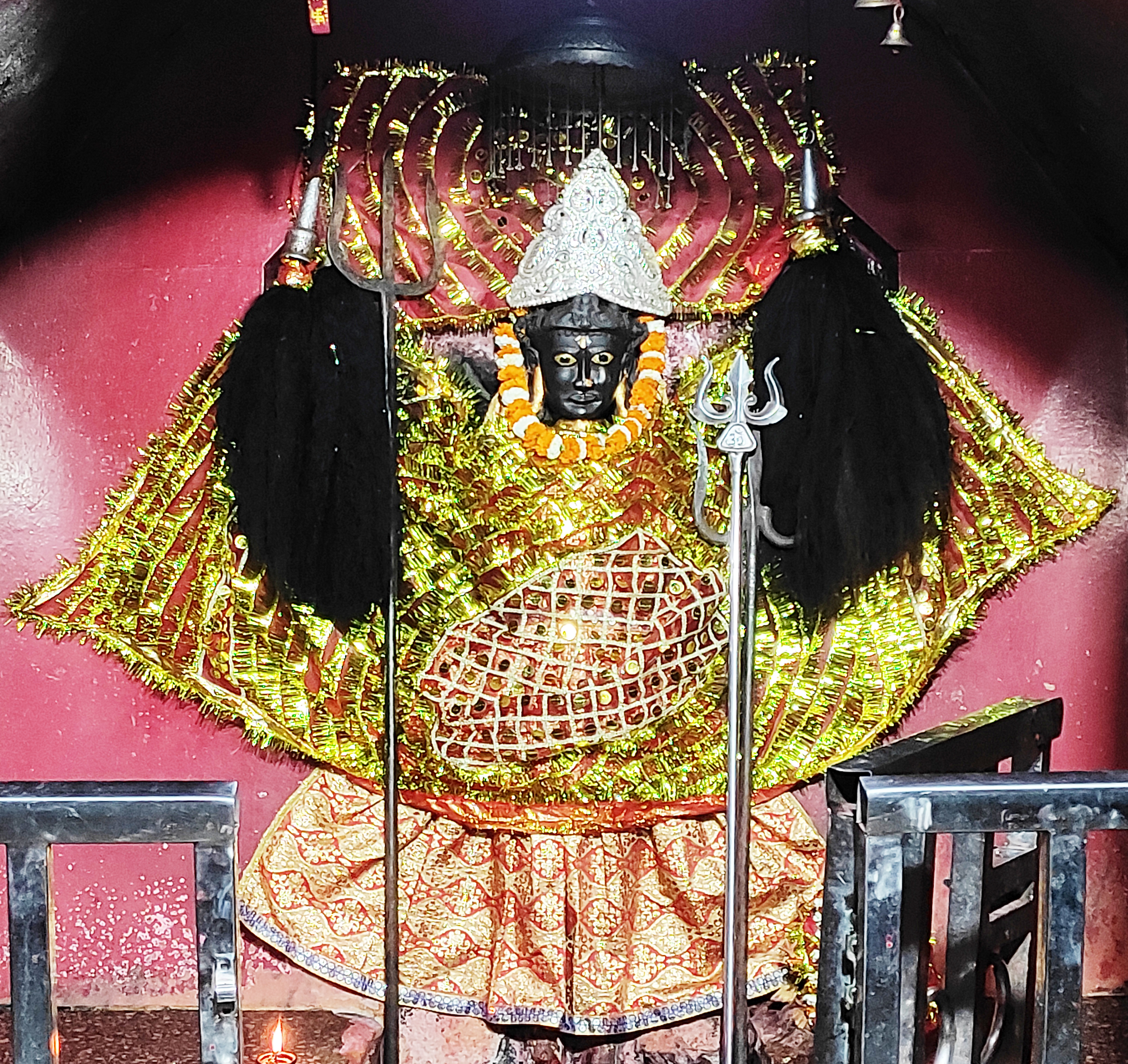

- Location in Nepal

Religion
- Affiliation: Hinduism
- District: Bara
- Deity: Gadhimai (Goddesses of power)
- Festival: Gadhimai festival

Location
- Location: Bariyarpur Bara
- State: Madhesh Province
- Country: Nepal
- Coordinates: 26°59′35.7″N 85°02′47.8″E

Gadhimai Temple (Nepali: गढीमाई मन्दिर) is a Hindu temple of Gadhimai Devi, an aspect of Kali, the Hindu goddess of power. The temple is situated in Mahagadhimai Municipality in Bara District of south central Nepal, though the term usually refers to Gadhimai festival, conducted at the Gadhimai temple area in central Terai of Nepal.

== See also ==
- Shakti
