= Dhan Lal Thokar =

Nepalese politician

Honourable Dhan Lal Thokar
- धन लाल ठोकर
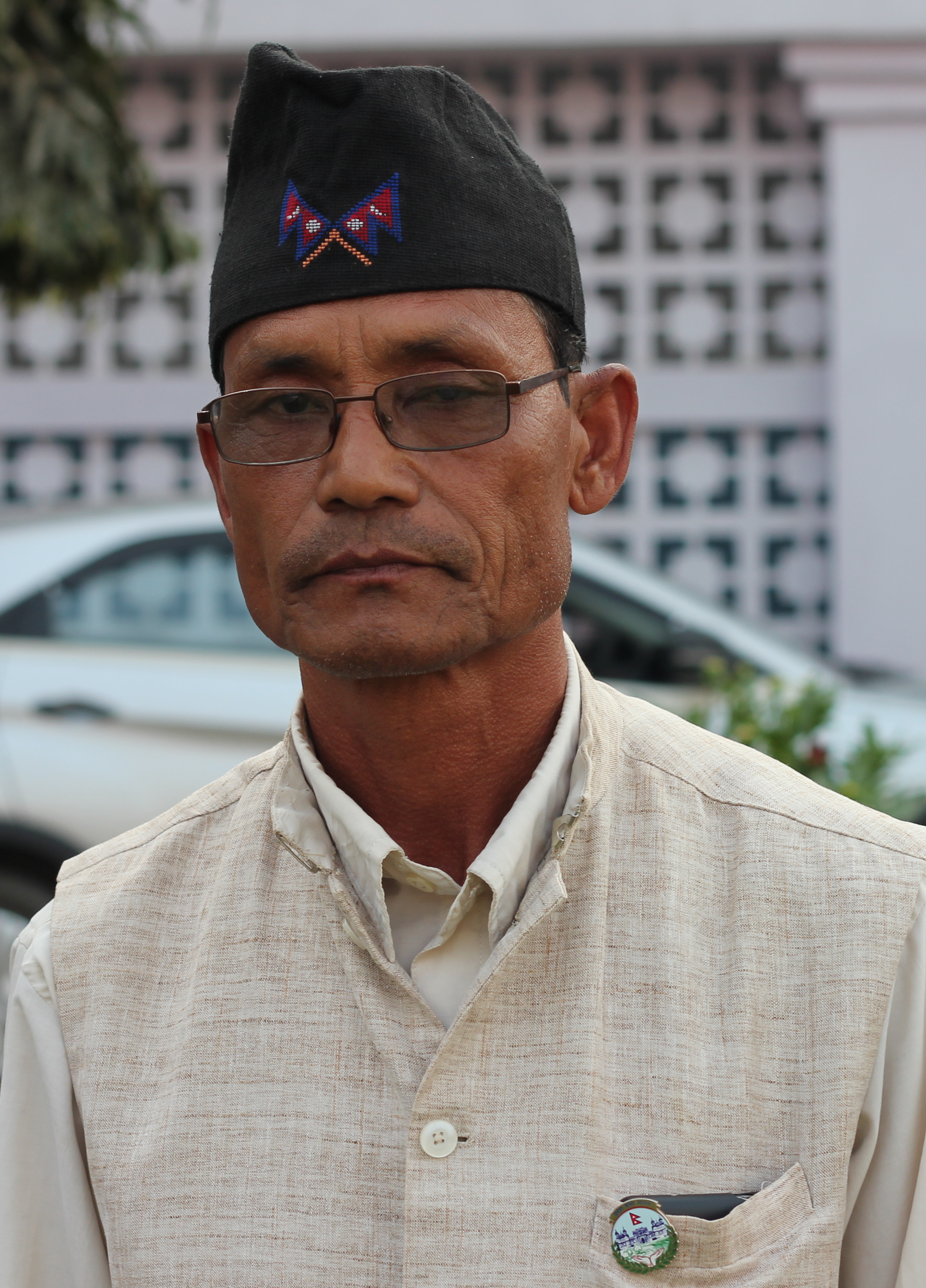
- Portrait of Thokar in 2019

Province Assembly Member of Madhesh Province
- Incumbent
- Assumed office 2017
- Constituency: Proportional list

Personal details
- Party: Nepali Congress
- Occupation: Politician

Dhan Lal Thokar (Nepali: धन लाल ठोकर) is a Nepalese politician who is elected member of Provincial Assembly of Madhesh Province from Nepali Congress. Thokar, a resident of Chandrapur Municipality, Rautahat was elected to the 2017 provincial assembly election from Rautahat 4(A).

== Electoral history ==
=== 2017 Nepalese provincial elections ===
Party	Candidate	Votes
Nepali Congress	Dhan Lal Thokar	13,610
CPN (Maoist Centre)	Devendra Prasad Patel	12,271
Independent	Raju Dhami	3,753
Rastriya Janata Party Nepal	Mukti Narayan Chaudhary	2,696
Others		1,337
Invalid votes		1,626
Result	Congress gain	
Source: Election Commission
