= Garuda Municipality =

Garuda Municipality गरुडा नगरपालिका
- Municipality
- Nickname: Garuda
- Location in Nepal
- Coordinates: 26.95°N 85.32°E
- Country: Nepal
- Zone: Narayani
- District: Rautahat

Government
  - Mayor: kanthmuni prasad Jaysawal (FSFN)
  - Deputy Mayor: punam Chaudhary (NC)
- Time zone: UTC+5:45 (NST)
- Postal code: 44500
- Area code: 055
- Website: http://garudamun.gov.np

Garuda is a municipality in Rautahat District in the Narayani Zone of south-eastern Nepal. It is a newly created municipality by merging 7 former Village development committees namely Garuda Bairiya, Malahi, Basbiti Jingadiya, Gedahiguthi, Jayanagar, Mahamadpur and Pothiyahi.

One of the biggest sugar mill of Nepal, "Shree Ram Sugar Mills", is situated here.

== Geography ==
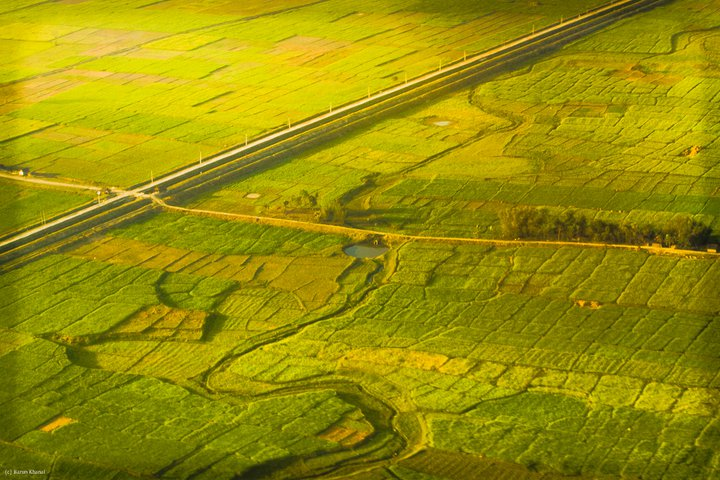
Aerial view of Terai plains near Garuda Municipality, Nepal

Garuda Municipality lies in plain of Terai region of Nepal. The land, here is fertile and humus containing.

== Climate ==
Climate Zone	Elevation Range	% of Area
Lower Tropical	below 300 meters (1,000 ft)	94.4%
Upper Tropical	300 to 1,000 meters 1,000 to 3,300 ft.	5.6%

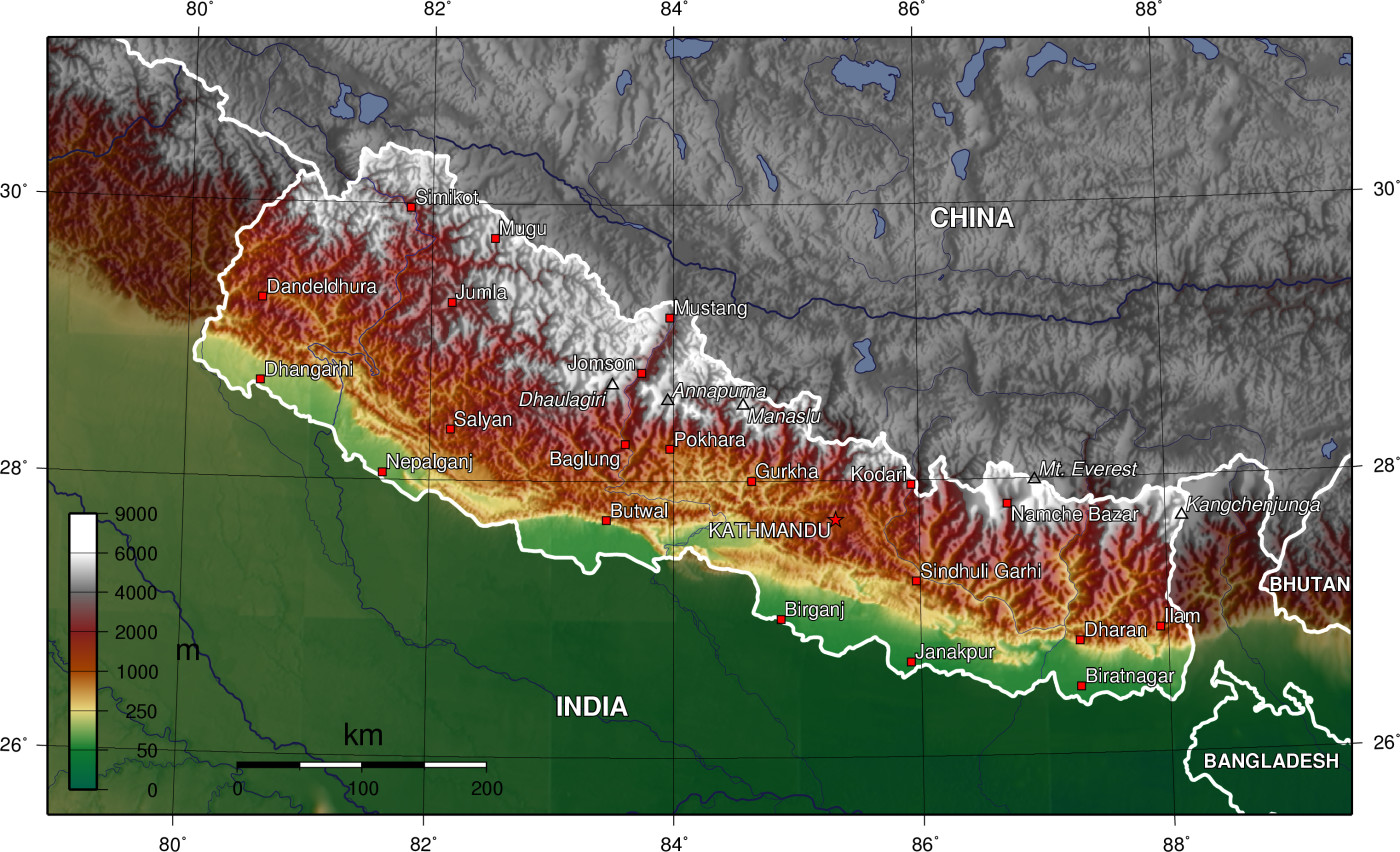
Nepal topography. The green/yellow zones hold the Inner Terai valleys.

The Garuda Municipality has a humid, tropical climate. The mean annual rainfall at the Garuda Municipality was 2,214 mm (87.2 in) between 1995 and 2006. More than 80% of the total annual rainfall occurs during the monsoon season from June to September. Average temperatures ranged from 8.08 °C (46.54 °F) in January to 34.91 °C (94.84 °F) in June.

In the past, the inner and outer Terai were a formidable barrier between Nepal and potential invaders from India because marshes and forests were infested by anopheline mosquitos that transmitted virulent strains of malaria, especially during the hot spring and rainy summer monsoon.

Garuda Municipality, 26°N, 85°E

Climate chart (precipitation, max. and min. temperature)
J	F	M	A	M	J	J	A	S	O	N	D
9 23 9	13 26 11	19 32 14	53 34 20	170 33 23	341 33 25	559 32 26	359 33 26	311 32 24	89 31 22	12 28 14	6 25 10
- █ Average max. and min. temperatures in °C
- █ Precipitation totals in mm
- Source: Levoyageur
Imperial conversion
J	F	M	A	M	J	J	A	S	O	N	D
0.4 73 48	0.5 79 52	0.7 90 57	2.1 93 68	6.7 91 73	13 91 77	22 90 79	14 91 79	12 90 75	3.5 88 72	0.5 82 57	0.2 77 50
- █ Average max. and min. temperatures in °F
- █ Precipitation totals in inches

There are several differences between the climate on the eastern edge of the Terai at Biratnagar in Nepal and on the western edge of the Terai at Nepaljung in Nepal to that of Garuda Municipality in Nepal although they lies in same plain of Terai.

- Moving inland and away from monsoon sources in the Bay of Bengal, the climate becomes more continental with a greater difference between summer and winter.
- In the far western Terai, which is five degrees latitude further north, the coldest months' average is 3 °C (37 °F) cooler.
- Total rainfall markedly diminishes from east to west. The monsoon arrives later, is much less intense and ends sooner. However, winters are wetter in the west.au in Nepal near the central edge although both lies in Terai.
- Moving inland and away from monsoon sources in the Bay of Bengal, the climate becomes more continental with a greater difference between summer and winter.
- In the far western Terai, which is five degrees latitude further north, the coldest months' average is 3 °C (37 °F) cooler.
- Total rainfall markedly diminishes from east to west. The monsoon arrives later, is much less intense and ends sooner. However, winters are wetter in the west.

=== Shree Higher Secondary School, Garuda ===
This school offers education up to 12th class and follow the British education

=== Nepal Police School, Basbitti Jingadiya ===
This is one of a regional system of Nepal Police School in Nepal. This school also offers education up to 12th class and follow the curriculum of Government School of Nepal.

== Transport ==
It is the mid of Gaur-Chandranigahpur Highway which starts from Gaur and joins to East-West Highway in Chandrapur connecting this place to all major cities of Nepal.

It is 22 km north of Gaur and 20 km south of Chandrapur.

The transport facility is reliable. All the buses starting from Gaur and heading towards capital of Nepal, Kathmandu, and other major cities like Birgunj, Janakpurdham, Pokhara, Biratnagar, Nepalgunj, Bharatpur, etc. stop here as a next hub of passengers.

The nearest domestic airport, Simara Airport, is in Simra while nearest International airport, Nijgadh International Airport, is under construction in Nijgadh.

One can reach to all major cities of India using Indian Railways available at Bairgania via Gaur.

== Economy ==
This place gained its fortune after the Gaur-Chandranigahpur Highway was constructed. After the highway construction, developments and infrastructures followed around these areas. In 1994 A.D. Shree Ram Sugar Mill was erected in Garuda. With the establishment of the sugar industry, farmers had opportunity to open business with the factory. They increased their sugarcane farming and sold it to the factory in their backyard. The factory provided jobs and opened sources of business in this place.

Today the place is the fastest growing market of Rautahat district with every business one can name. It has highest economic rate among all villages in its districts. Some of the major people like Jaiswal, Sharma, etc are well known for their business standard in Garuda. It is the center of business in the area with few banks, five-six petrol pumps, hundreds of Grocery stores, handful of Shopping centers, small granary and Eating-oil mills, shoes factory, several restaurants, clinics and Area police station (Ilaka prahari karyalaya). Approximately more than 50% of the people are involved in farming and some other engaged in Business or other traditional works.
