= Gadhimai, Rautahat =

Municipality in Province No. 2, Nepal

Gadhimai Municipality गढीमाई नगरपालिका Gadhimai Nagarpalika
- Municipality
- Nickname: Sarlahi Transit
- Location in Nepal
- Coordinates: 26°56′23″N 85°22′04″E
- Country: Nepal
- Province: Province No. 2
- Zone: Narayani
- District: Rautahat

Government
  - Type: Mayor-Council government
  - Mayor: Shyam Yadav
  - Deputy Mayor: Shubhadra Gupta

Area
  - Total: 49.44 km^{2} (19.09 sq mi)

Population (2011)
  - Total: 40,410
  - Density: 817.4/km^{2} (2,117/sq mi)
  - Ethnic Groups: Sahani Mahato Tharu Yadav Muslim Mallaah Brahmin Bhumihar Dom Chamar Thakur Bania Sahuji Rauniar
  - Religions: Sanatan Dharma Islam
- Time zone: UTC+5:45 (NST)
- Postal code: 44513
- Area code: 055
- Geocode: NP-TW
- Main language: Bajjika, Bhojpuri, Tharu, Urdu, Maithili, Nepali
- Website: http://gadhimaimun.gov.np/

Gadhimai is a municipality in Rautahat district of Narayani zone, Nepal. It lies at the border of Rautahat district that links Sarlahi District over Bagmati River. It was formed by merging former 6 Village development committees Gamhariya, samanpur, Sangrampur, Bahuwa Madanpur, Dharampur and Bariyarpur just before 2017 Nepalese local elections.

The current Member of the Legislative Assembly of Rautahat District Constituency 4(B) Pradesh Sabha and former VDC chairman Sheikh Abul Kalam Azad better known by his nickname Phool Babu is a resident.

== Geography ==
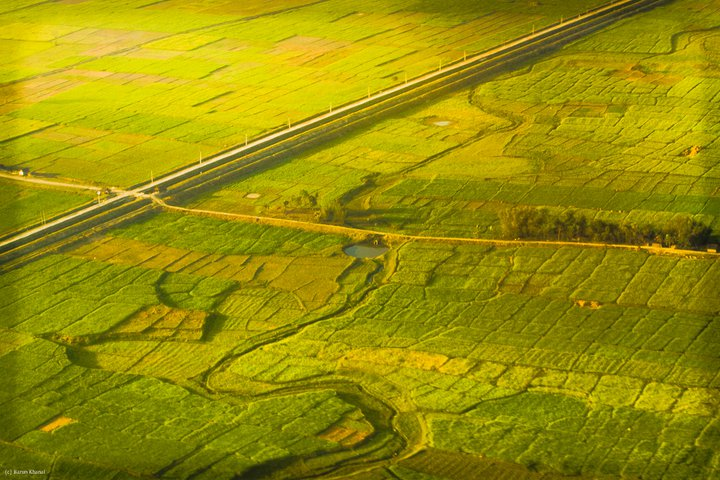
Aerial view of Terai plains near Gadhimai Municipality, Nepal

Gadhimai Municipality lies in plain of Terai region of Nepal.The land, here is fertile and humus containing.

== Climate ==
Climate Zone	Elevation Range	% of Area
Lower Tropical	below 300 meters (1,000 ft)	94.4%
Upper Tropical	300 to 1,000 meters 1,000 to 3,300 ft.	5.6%

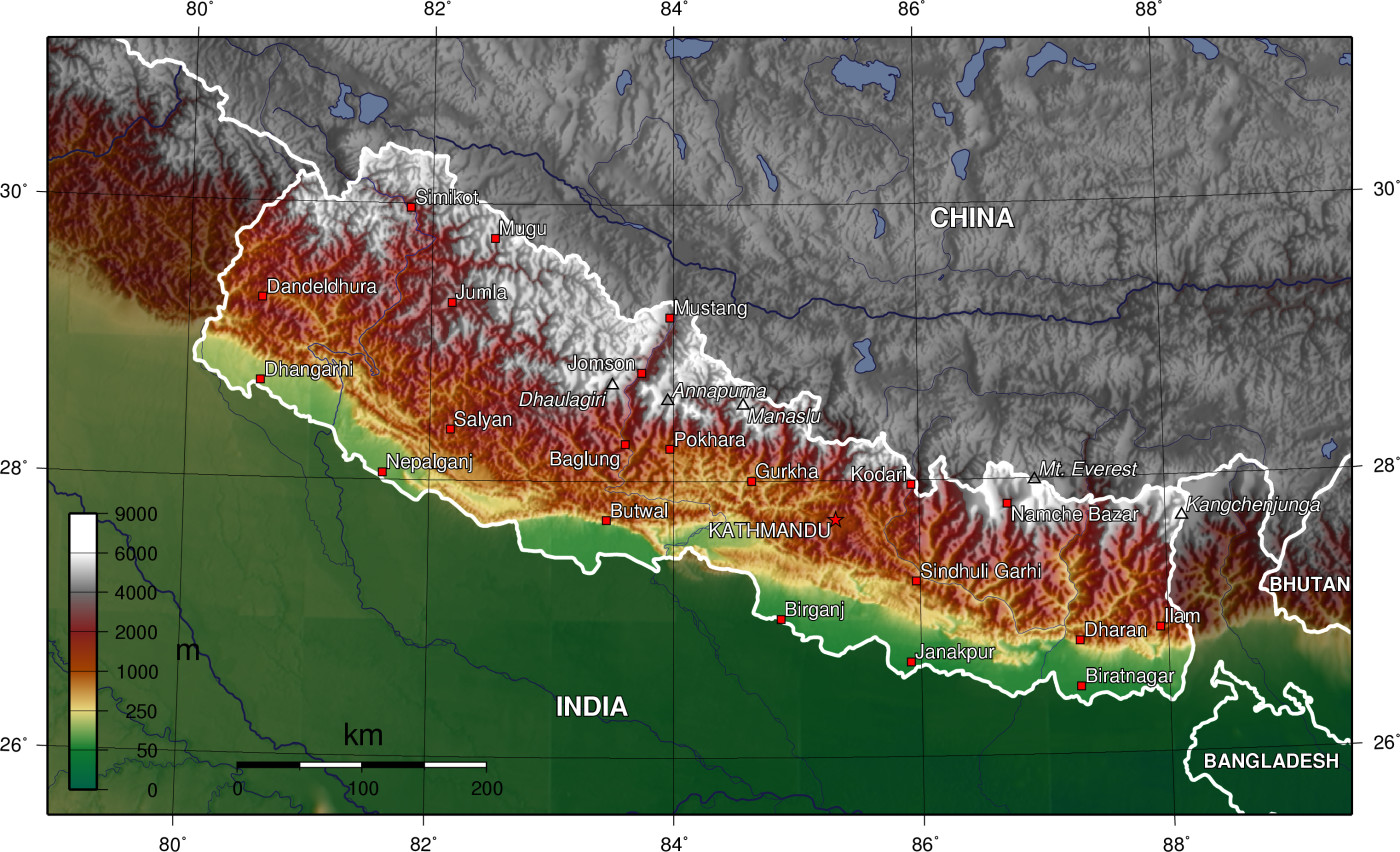
Nepal topography. The green/yellow zones hold the Inner Terai valleys.

The Gadhimai Municipality has a humid, tropical climate. The mean annual rainfall at the Gadhimai Municipality was 2,214 mm (87.2 in) between 1995 and 2006. More than 80% of the total annual rainfall occurs during the monsoon season from June to September. Average temperatures ranged from 8.08 °C (46.54 °F) in January to 34.91 °C (94.84 °F) in June.

In the past, the inner and outer Terai were a formidable barrier between Nepal and potential invaders from India because marshes and forests were infested by anopheline mosquitos that transmitted virulent strains of malaria, especially during the hot spring and rainy summer monsoon.

Gadhimai Municipality, 26°N, 85°E

Climate chart (precipitation, max. and min. temperature)
J	F	M	A	M	J	J	A	S	O	N	D
9 23 9	13 26 11	19 32 14	53 34 20	170 33 23	341 33 25	559 32 26	359 33 26	311 32 24	89 31 22	12 28 14	6 25 10
- █ Average max. and min. temperatures in °C
- █ Precipitation totals in mm
- Source: Levoyageur
Imperial conversion
J	F	M	A	M	J	J	A	S	O	N	D
0.4 73 48	0.5 79 52	0.7 90 57	2.1 93 68	6.7 91 73	13 91 77	22 90 79	14 91 79	12 90 75	3.5 88 72	0.5 82 57	0.2 77 50
- █ Average max. and min. temperatures in °F
- █ Precipitation totals in inches

There are several differences between the climate on the eastern edge of the Terai at Biratnagar in Nepal and on the western edge of the Terai at Nepaljung in Nepal to that of Gadhimai Municipality in Nepal although they lies in same plain of Terai.

- Moving inland and away from monsoon sources in the Bay of Bengal, the climate becomes more continental with a greater difference between summer and winter.
- In the far western Terai, which is five degrees latitude further north, the coldest months' average is 3 °C (37 °F) cooler.
- Total rainfall markedly diminishes from east to west. The monsoon arrives later, is much less intense and ends sooner. However, winters are wetter in the west.au in Nepal near the central edge although both lies in Terai.
- Moving inland and away from monsoon sources in the Bay of Bengal, the climate becomes more continental with a greater difference between summer and winter.
- In the far western Terai, which is five degrees latitude further north, the coldest months' average is 3 °C (37 °F) cooler.
- Total rainfall markedly diminishes from east to west. The monsoon arrives later, is much less intense and ends sooner. However, winters are wetter in the west.

== Education ==
=== Shree Shankar Gudar Campus, Samanpur ===
The origin of this campus goes back to its former "Shree Shankar Gudar Higher Secondary School" and further "Shree Shankar Gudar Secondary School", one of the oldest school in Nepal inaugurated when Samanpur was once limelight of whole Rautahat district. The institution has about 1000 students.

Shree Shankar Gudar Campus offers bachelor courses like Bachelor of Education, Bachelor of Arts at the moment while its former entities "Shree Shankar Gudar Higher Secondary School" offers 10+2 courses of Higher Secondary Education Board and "Shree Shankar Gudar Secondary School" offers up to 10th class of School Leaving Certificate (Nepal).

=== Shree Saraswati Higher Secondary School, Malahi Tola Chilmiliya ===
This school offers education up to 12th class and follow the curriculum of Government School of Nepal.

=== Madrasa Islahul Muslemeen, Gamhariya ===
The eldest Islamic school of Nepal "Madrasa Islahul Muslemeen" is situated in Gamhariya which was founded by "Sheikh Hajee Alibaksh". Later his son "Sheikh Hajee Sujaeet" added some more infrastructures. The great-grand son, Phool Babu, of the founder of this Madrasa is currently the chief of this Islamic School.

The Madrasa has around 700 students. Among them around 100 are boarders mostly from Rautahat District, Sarlahi District and Bihar (India).The curriculum of study is not only Islamic study like "Deene Taleem" but also Mathematics and Languages like English, Arabic, Persian (Farsi), Urdu, Hindi and Nepali are taught. It is said that there is no single family in this village who don't have at least one Mawlānā (Graduate of religious Institution) and also boast for highest number of Mawlānā in one VDC in whole Nepal.

There are some other schools in this municipality which offer education up to 10th class and follow the curriculum of Government School of Nepal.

== Transport ==
This municipality lies in the middle of Rautahat District and bordering Sarlahi District and is the center of oldest highway of Rautahat district called "Rajaiya Sadak" which still connects Rautahat District headquarters Gaur and East-West Highway terminal Chandrapur.

East side it is connected to Sarlahi District via several sub localities over Bagmati River whereas on the west side It is connected with new Highway called "Gaur-Chandranigahpur Highway" through Garuda Municipality that links this municipality to capital of Nepal, Kathmandu, and other major cities like Birgunj, Janakpurdham, Pokhara, Biratnagar, Nepalgunj, Bharatpur, etc. via East-West Highway.

As it is connected to Rautahat District headquarters Gaur via "Rajaiya Sadak" as well as via "Gaur-Chandranigahpur Highway" and Gaur is also border of Nepal that links India via Bairgania, one can reach to all major cities of India using Indian Railways available at Bairgania.

Land transportation like Tanga, Rickshaw, Jeep, Bus is available to reach Garuda Municipality.

The nearest domestic airport, Simara Airport, is in Simra while nearest International airport, Nijgadh International Airport, is under construction in Nijgadh. Currently passengers use Tribhuvan International Airport located in capital of Nepal, Kathmandu, for International flight.

it is 20 km north of Gaur and 20 km south of Chandrapur.

== Economy ==
Its one locality Samanpur was major financial center in Rauthat district. The others were Gaur, Pipara, Kathariya and Chandranigahpur. Due to flooding problem from Bagmati River as well as creation of new highway "Gaur-Chandranigahpur Highway" and lack of attention from central government its status got degraded day by day.

There is another emerging market in Bariyarpur(Malahi Bazar).

The major economy of this municipality is farming. Sugarcane, Paddy, Wheat, Mustard, Dal, Vegetables, Fruits, etc. are the major production of this municipality. The other economy is the remittance from the people working mostly in Kathmandu, India and Gulf Countries.

== Culture ==
The culture of this Municipality is the mix of Muslim as well as Hindu community. The municipality got its name from one of the Mela held in its locality Sangrampur(Sundarpur).

== Communication ==
Nepal Telecom, Smart and Ncell have network coverage. Ncell has a 4G network for a long time there but now Nepal Telecom also has a 4G network.
