= Smart Cell =

Prototype technology for Communication industry

Smart Cells are radio access nodes that provide wireless connectivity across multiple spectrum ranges and technologies. As of January 2014, Macrocells, Small Cells, and Wi-Fi connections were the primary means of data connectivity. For these types of cells, the spectrum utilized is static and is based on the antenna installed. A Smart Cell may transmit multiple frequencies and technologies which are controlled by the software and not the hardware (antenna).

Smart Cells are currently in the research and development stage, but support software-defined networks, which are proliferating the current mobile network structure, are being supported.

It's possible that Smart Cells will lower capital and operational costs due to reduced equipment and manual manipulations needed to modify cell site coverage. The term Smart Cell is also used to identify other technologies that enhance cell sites where it has reduced the need to manually manipulate radio access equipment or add additional carriers at a radio access node.
