= Baban Singh =

Nepali politician

- बबन सिंह

Member of Constituent Assembly
- In office 28 May 2008 – 28 May 2012
- Constituency: Rautahat-1

Personal details
- Party: independent candidate

Baban Singh (Nepali: बबन सिंह) is a Nepalese member of parliament and politician, who won the Rautahat-1 seat in the 2008 Constituent Assembly election as an independent candidate. Singh hails from the Mahror branch of Rajput clan. Singh won the seat with 9201 votes. At the time of the election, Singh was on the 'most wanted list' of the Nepalese police forces. According to sources Singh was a member of the 'Terai Army'. .

Singh did not make any public appearance during the election campaign. Singh's campaign carried the slogan Hamara Ke Bachali ('Save me'), pleading to the voters to use the vote in order to save him from a death penalty. Singh's family was active in running the campaign.

Singh has also been accused of inciting the violent uprising against maoists on March 21, 2007, in Gaur, where 27 Maoists were killed.

On May 27, 2008, Singh was able to reach the Birendra International Conference Centre to be sworn in as a Constituent Assembly member, without being caught by police. On June 1, 2008, he surrendered to the Gaur District Court, but was released by the court on general date following legal proceedings.
