= Dharampur, Rautahat =

Coordinates: 26°55′N 85°22′E

Dharampur धर्मपुर
- Village development committee
- Interactive map of Dharampur
- Country: Nepal
- Zone: Narayani Zone
- District: Rautahat District

Population
  - Total: 7,600
- Time zone: UTC+5:45 (Nepal Time)
- Postal code: 44500

Dharampur was a village development committee in Rautahat District in the Narayani Zone of south-eastern Nepal.

Just before 2017 Nepalese local elections, it was merged with other 5 Village development committees samanpur, Sangrampur, Bahuwa Madanpur, Gamhariya and Bariyarpur to form Gadhimai Municipality.

At the time of the 1991 Nepal census it had a population of 7600 people living in 1561 individual households. Mostly Yadav caste in dharampur village.
