= Dev Prasad Timilsena =

Nepali politician

Honourable Dev Prasad Timilsena MP
- देव प्रसाद तिमिल्सेना

Member of Parliament, Pratinidhi Sabha
- In office 4 March 2018 – 12 September 2025
- Preceded by: Satya Narayan Bhagat
- Succeeded by: Ganesh Paudel
- Constituency: Rautahat 4

Personal details
- Born: 1 October 1970 (age 55) Rautahat District
- Citizenship: Nepali
- Party: Nepali Congress

Dev Prasad Timilsena is a Nepalese Politician and serving as a Member Of House Of Representatives (Nepal) elected from Rautahat-4, Province No. 2. He is a member of the Nepali Congress party.
