= Gadhimai festival =

Hindu festival in Nepal

Gadhimai festival गढ़िमाई पर्व
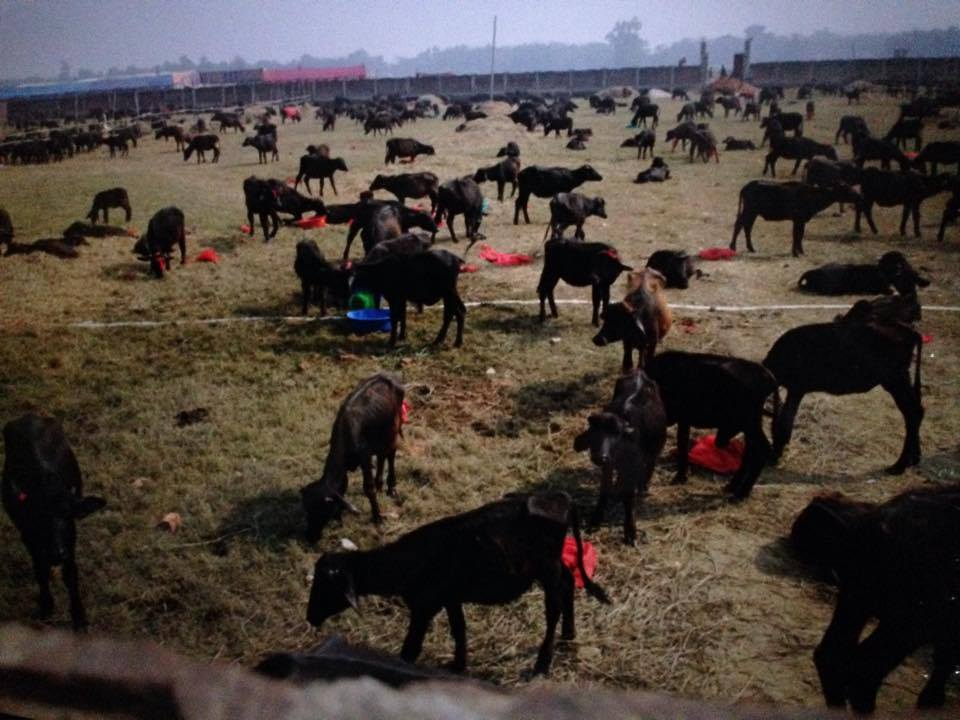
- Animals at the Gadhimai festival
- Genre: Festival
- Frequency: Every 5 years
- Venue: Bariyarpur
- Location: Bara District
- Previous event: 2024
- Attendance: 5 million people
- Area: 3–5 km radius around the Gadhimai Temple
- Major events: Religious

Gadhimai festival is a Hindu festival held every five years in Nepal at the Gadhimai Temple of Bariyarpur, in Bara District, about 160 kilometres (99 mi) south of the capital Kathmandu, and about 7 kilometres (4.3 mi) east of the city of Kalaiya, near the Indo-Nepal border. The event involves large-scale sacrificial slaughter of animals, including water buffalo, pigs, goats, chickens, and pigeons, with the goal of pleasing Gadhimai, the goddess of power. People also make other offerings, including coconuts, sweets, and red-coloured clothes. The festival has been described as the world's largest animal sacrifice event or one of the largest. The Supreme Court of Nepal ordered an end to live animal sacrifices in 2019, but the order was "widely ignored".

It is estimated that 250,000–500,000 animals were sacrificed during the 2009 event. In 2015, it was erroneously reported that Nepal's temple trust planned to cancel all future animal sacrifices at the festival.

== History ==
Millions of people have attended the festival, which began around 1759. It is said that the festival originated when feudal lord Bhagwan Chaudhary dreamed that he could offer a blood sacrifice to the goddess Gadhimai in order to be freed from jail. Animal sacrifice at the festival attracts people from both Nepal and India, while the majority of the sacrificed animals are illegally transported across the border from India into Nepal.

== Animal sacrifice ==
Participants believe that sacrificing animals to the Hindu goddess Gadhimai can end evil and bring prosperity. The festival has prompted numerous protests by animal rights activists and Nepalese Hindus from Hill region.

In 2009, activists made several attempts to stop the ritual; this included Brigitte Bardot and Maneka Gandhi writing to the Nepalese government, asking it to stop the killings. A government official commented that they would not "interfere in the centuries-old tradition of the people". Ram Bahadur Bomjon, claimed by some of his supporters to be the reincarnation of the Buddha, said that he would attempt to stop the sacrifice at the festival, preaching nonviolence and offering a blessing at the place. His promise prompted the government to send additional forces to prevent any incident. A month before the festival, politicians realized there would be a "severe shortage" of goats for the ritual sacrifice, as well as for the consumption of mutton during the festival. They began a radio campaign urging farmers to sell their animals.

The festival started in the first week of November 2009 and ended in the first week of December (up to Makar Sankranti). Sacrificial animals included white mice, pigeons, roosters, ducks, swine, and male water buffalo. More than 20,000 buffalo were sacrificed on the first day. It is estimated that 250,000 animals were sacrificed during the Gadhimai festival of 2009. The ritual killings were performed by more than 200 men in a concrete slaughterhouse near the temple. After the festival, the meat, bones, and hides of the animals were sold to companies in India and Nepal.

In October 2014, Gauri Maulekhi (People for Animals Uttarakhand trustee and Humane Society International [HSI] consultant) filed a petition against the illegal transportation of animals from India to Nepal for slaughter. After this, the Supreme Court of India passed an interim order directing the Government of India to prevent animals from being illegally transported across the border for sacrifice at Gadhimai. The court also asked animal protection groups and others to devise an action plan to ensure the court order was implemented. NG Jayasimha, HSI India representative, visited Nepal to ensure the ban was being adhered to. In an interview with the Times of India, he said, "I am very pleased that we were able to sit down with the Nepali politicians, to speak up for the hundreds of thousands of innocent animals who are condemned to an utterly unjustified beheading at Gadhimai. We also spoke directly to the Gadhimai temple and the local magistrate, so they can be in no doubt of the overwhelming call for compassion. We sincerely hope that they will act to stop this unnecessary bloodshed". The Indian Ministry of Home Affairs directed the states of Bihar and Uttar Pradesh to monitor and make sure no animals got to Nepal for the festival. It was later reported that 30,000 to 200,000 animals were slaughtered during the 2014 event.

Nepal's temple trust announced the cancellation of all future animal sacrifices at the country's Gadhimai festival in July 2015. The event was also "banned" by HSI India, though this had no legal force.

In 2019, it was reported that the festival took place again, and the sacrifice involved water buffalo, goats, rats, chickens, pigs, and pigeons. It was met with opposition from activists. The 2024 festival was also protested by animal right groups.

== See also ==
- Animal sacrifice in Hinduism
- Diet in Hinduism
