= Sangrampur, Rautahat =

Sangrampur संग्रामपुर
- Village development committee
- Location in Nepal
- Coordinates: 26.95°N 85.37°E
- Country: Nepal
- Zone: Narayani Zone
- District: Rautahat District

Population (1991)
  - Total: 3,978
- Time zone: UTC+5:45 (Nepal Time)

Sangrampur was a village development committee in Rautahat District in the Narayani Zone of south-eastern Nepal.

Just before 2017 Nepalese local elections, it was merged with other 5 Village development committees samanpur, Gamhariya, Bahuwa Madanpur, Dharampur and Bariyarpur to form Gadhimai Municipality.

At the time of the 1991 Nepal census it had a population of 3978 people living in 787 individual households.
