= Bahuwa Madanpur =

Baluwa Madanpur बलुवा मदनपुर Baluwa Madanpur
- Village development committee
- Nickname: बलुवा मदनपुर
- Location in Nepal
- Coordinates: 26.95°N 85.39°E
- Country: Nepal
- Zone: Narayani Zone
- District: Rautahat District

Population (1991)
  - Total: 1,903
- Time zone: UTC+5:45 (Nepal Time)

Baluwa Madanpur was a village development committee in Rautahat District in the Narayani Zone of south-eastern Nepal.

Just before 2017 Nepalese local elections, it was merged with other 5 Village development committees Samanpur, Sangrampur, Gamhariya, Dharampur and Bariyarpur to form Gadhimai Municipality.

At the time of the 1991 Nepal census it had a population of 1903.
