= Sheikh Abul Kalam Azad =

Nepalese politician

Phool Babu फूल बाबु
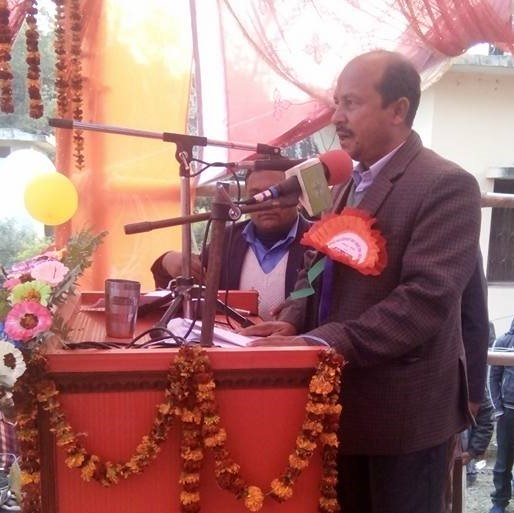

Minister of State for Energy, Irrigation and Water Supply in Madhesh Province
- Incumbent
- Assumed office 31 July 2023

Minister of State for Social Development in Madhesh Province
- In office 3 February 2023 – 30 July 2023

Member of the Legislative Assembly in Pradesh Sabha
- Incumbent
- Assumed office 25 November 2022

President of Province No. 2 Development Assembly, Nepal
- In office 14 February 2019 – 19 November 2022

Member of the Legislative Assembly in Pradesh Sabha
- In office 10 December 2017 – 19 November 2022

Chairman of the Gamhariya, Nepal
- In office 1997–2017
- Preceded by: Sheikh Tabarak

Personal details
- Born: Gamhariya, Rautahat, Nepal

Sheikh Abul Kalam Azad better known by his nickname Phool Babu (Nepali: फूल बाबु) is a high-profile Nepalese politician, Social Worker and Minister of State for Energy, Irrigation and Water Supply in Madhesh Province. Previously he served as Minister of State for Social Development in Madhesh Province. He won second time in a row Member of the Legislative Assembly (Nepali: प्रदेश सभा सदस्य) of Rautahat District Constituency 4(B) Pradesh Sabha. He is also former VDC chairman(Nepali: अध्यक्ष) of Gamhariya, Nepal.

== Personal life and early career ==
Phool Babu was born into an affluent Muslim Sheikh family in Gamhariya, a village in Rautahat District, some 90 kilometres east of Nepal's financial capital Birgunj. His father, grand father and great-grandfather have very long history of ruling this area as Zamindar. He has four sons and three daughters. His Wife name is Sahnaz Begam Nuri.

He started his political career from Nepali Congress party and won the local election from Nepali Congress at the time when Communist Party UML were making a clean sweep in Nepalese local elections, 1997 and served as chairman (Nepali: अध्यक्ष) of VDC Gamhariya thereafter.

The local representatives that were elected in 1997 had their five-year terms expired at the height of the brutal Maoist insurgency.

The 10-year war ended in 2006 and the country began a rocky transition from a Hindu monarchy to a secular federal republic, which has seen it cycle through nine governments.

== Nepalese local elections, 2017 ==
Just before Nepalese local elections, 2017 Gadhimai Municipality was formed by merging former 6 Village development committees Gamhariya, samanpur, Sangrampur, Bahuwa Madanpur, Dharampur and Bariyarpur. In Nepalese local elections, 2017 he fought election for the Mayor from Gadhimai Municipality from Madhesh-based Party, Rastriya Janata Party Nepal but lost to Nepali Congress Shyam Yadav with very little margin.

== Nepalese provincial elections, 2017 ==
He has big influence on the public in Rautahat District and the people from his own and neighboring Municipality as well as Rautahat District giving him strong support to fight for Member of the Legislative Assembly in Nepalese provincial elections, 2017 and thus he was expecting for Ticket from Madhesh-based Rastriya Janata Party Nepal but due to some political unfairness, it was denied.

As Public support was with him and he was confident that he will win Nepalese provincial elections, 2017. So, he registered for Member of the Legislative Assembly as an independent (Nepali: स्वतंत्र पार्टी) and won the election.

He serves as Member of the Legislative Assembly (Nepali: प्रदेश सभा सदस्य) in Pradesh Sabha in Province No. 2, Nepal.

== Province No. 2 Development Assembly, Nepal ==
He served as a President of Province No. 2 Development Assembly (Nepali: प्रदेश नं. २ विकास समितिको सभापति) between 2017 and 2022.

== Nepalese provincial elections, 2022 ==
He got ticket from People's Socialist Party, Nepal and won again Member of the Legislative Assembly election.

He serves as Member of the Legislative Assembly (Nepali: प्रदेश सभा सदस्य) in Pradesh Sabha in Madhesh Province, Nepal.

== Madhesh Province Cabinet, Nepal ==
He currently serves as a Minister of State for Energy, Irrigation and Water Supply in Madhesh Province. Previously he served as Minister of State for Social Development. in Madhesh Province, Nepal.

== See also ==
- Mohammad Lalbabu Raut
- Upendra Yadav
- Rajendra Mahato
- Girija Prasad Koirala
- Pushpa Kamal Dahal
- Sher Bahadur Deuba
- Khadga Prasad Oli
