= Yogendra Rae Yadav =

Nepalese politician

- योगेन्द्र राय यादव
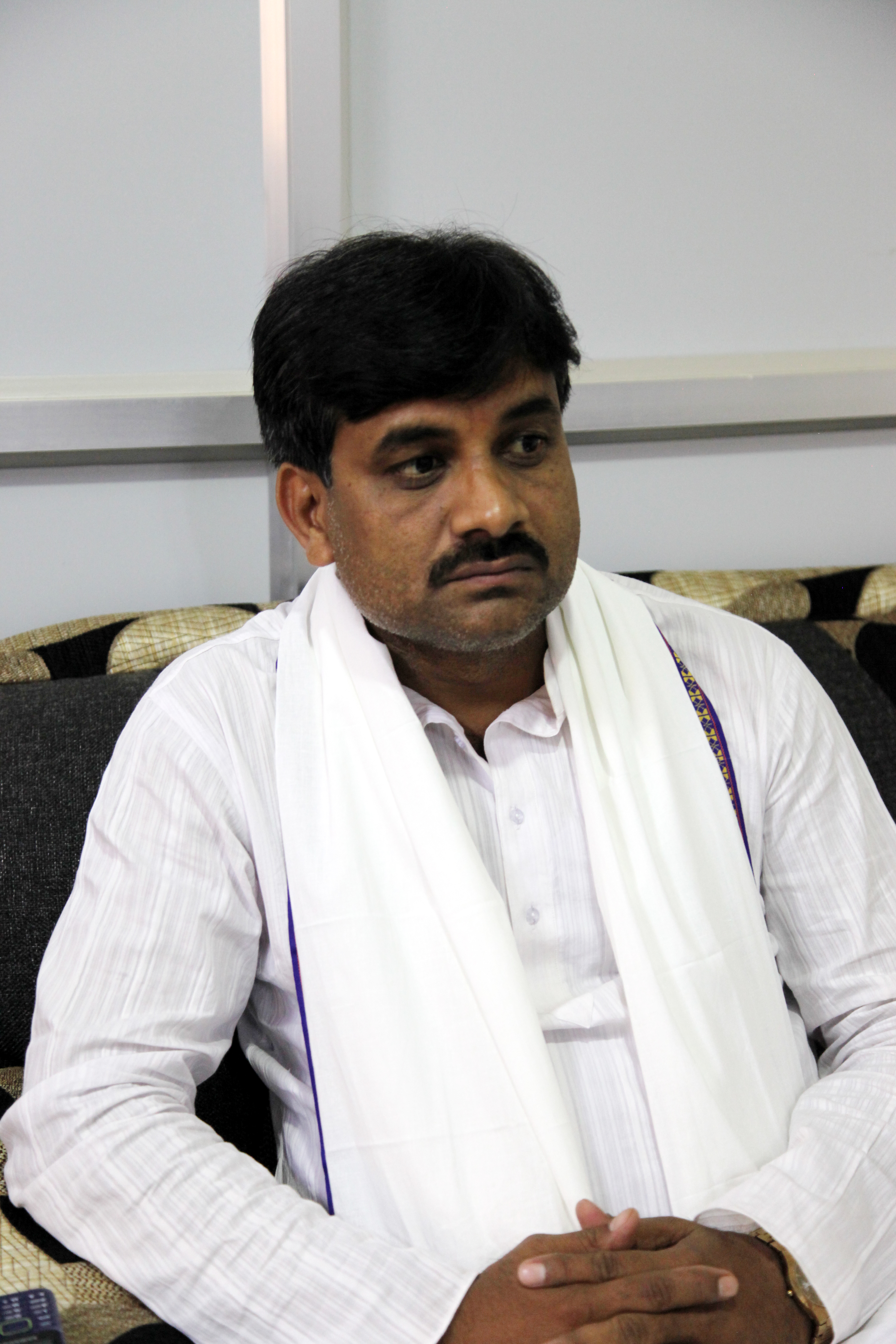
- Portrait of Yadav in 2019

State Minister for Land Management, Agriculture and Co-operatives of Madhesh Province
- In office 1 March 2018 – 2022
- Minister: Bijay Kumar Yadav
- Governor: Ratneshwar Lal Kayastha; Tilak Pariyar; Rajesh Jha; Hari Shankar Mishra
- Chief minister: Lalbabu Raut
- Preceded by: Assembly created

Province Assembly Member of Madhesh Province
- In office 2017–2022
- Preceded by: Assembly created
- Succeeded by: Krishna Prasad Yadav
- Constituency: Rautahat 1 (B)

Personal details
- Party: People's Socialist Party, Nepal
- Occupation: Politician

Yogendra Rae Yadav (Nepali: योगेन्द्र राय यादव) is a Nepalese politician who is former member of Provincial Assembly of Madhesh Province from People's Socialist Party, Nepal. Mandal, a resident of Rajdevi was elected to the 2017 provincial assembly election from Rautahat 1(B).

== Electoral history ==
=== 2017 Nepalese provincial elections ===
Party	Candidate	Votes
Federal Socialist Forum, Nepal	Yogendra Rae Yadav	8,957
Nepali Congress	Rajesh Kumar Chaudhary	8,679
CPN (Maoist Centre)	Upendra Prasad Sah	7,393
Others		2,406
Invalid votes		1,321
Result	FSFN gain	
Source: Election Commission
