= Pipara Simara =

Simara पिपरा सिमरा Simra
- City of Jitpursimara sub-metropolitan city
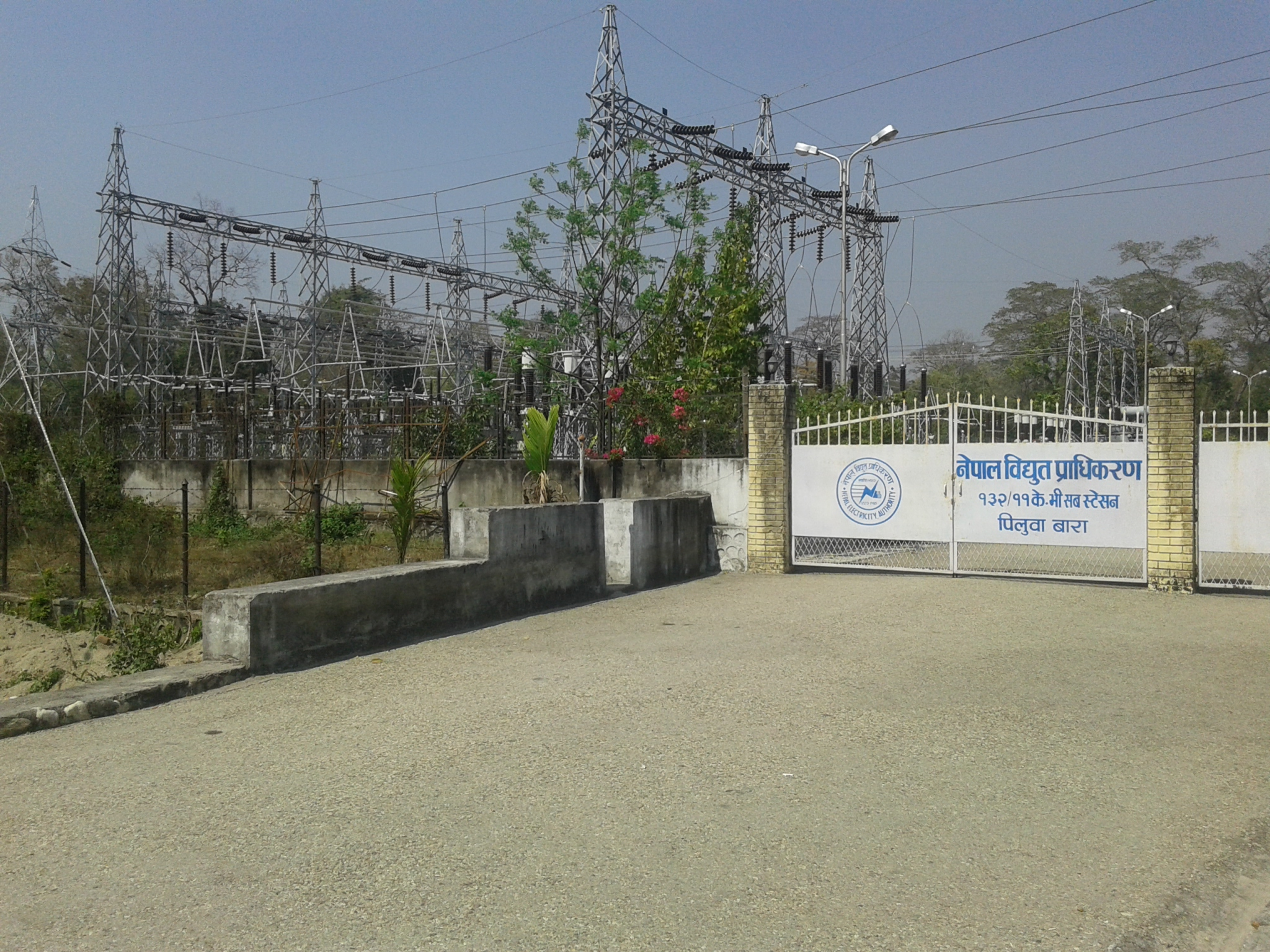
- Pipara Simara, Gadhimai 44400, Nepal

- Location in Nepal
- Coordinates: 27.16°N 84.97°E
- Country: Nepal
- Province: Province No. 2
- District: Bara District

Population (2011)
  - Total: 23,835
- Time zone: UTC+5:45 (Nepal Time)
- Area code: 053-52xxxx

Simara (also Simara or Simra; Nepali: सिमरा) is a rapidly growing city in Jitpursimara sub-metropolitan city in Bara District in Madhesh Province of south-eastern Nepal. The formerly Village Development Committee was merged to form a new municipality Gadhimai Municipality on 18 May 2014. Similarly, on 10 March 2017 Gadhimai Municipality, Inarwasira, Amlekhganj, as well as parts of Manharwa, Haraiya and Rampur Tokani were merged to form new Jitpursimara sub-metropolitan city. Aauraha, Panitanki, Manakamana Tole, Ramban, Narbasti, Bajani, Purwa Tole, etc are the villages in Simara. Auraha and Purwa Tole lie in the east, Bajani in the south, Manakamana Tole in north and Ramban & Narbasti in the west. At the time of the 2011 Nepal census it had a population of 23,835 people living in 5,253 individual households. The population has increased dramatically in last decade with a boom in real estate and rising numbers of new businesses in the city, so the current population might be estimated to be as high as 40,000, according to local journals.

== Climate ==
The highest temperature ever recorded in Simara was 42.8 °C (109.0 °F) on 6 June 1979, while the lowest temperature ever recorded was 1.0 °C (33.8 °F) on 23 January 1985.

Climate data for Simara Airport 130m (1991-2020)
| Month | Jan | Feb | Mar | Apr | May | Jun | Jul | Aug | Sep | Oct | Nov | Dec | Year |
|---|---|---|---|---|---|---|---|---|---|---|---|---|---|
| Mean daily maximum °C (°F) | 21.1 (70.0) | 25.8 (78.4) | 31.0 (87.8) | 35.1 (95.2) | 35.2 (95.4) | 34.5 (94.1) | 33.0 (91.4) | 33.1 (91.6) | 32.8 (91.0) | 31.9 (89.4) | 29.0 (84.2) | 24.1 (75.4) | 30.6 (87.1) |
| Daily mean °C (°F) | 14.4 (57.9) | 17.9 (64.2) | 22.4 (72.3) | 27.2 (81.0) | 29.2 (84.6) | 29.9 (85.8) | 29.4 (84.9) | 29.4 (84.9) | 28.6 (83.5) | 26.0 (78.8) | 21.5 (70.7) | 16.8 (62.2) | 24.4 (75.9) |
| Mean daily minimum °C (°F) | 7.7 (45.9) | 9.9 (49.8) | 13.8 (56.8) | 19.2 (66.6) | 23.2 (73.8) | 25.3 (77.5) | 25.7 (78.3) | 25.6 (78.1) | 24.4 (75.9) | 20.1 (68.2) | 13.9 (57.0) | 9.5 (49.1) | 18.2 (64.8) |
| Average precipitation mm (inches) | 14.1 (0.56) | 15.7 (0.62) | 17.3 (0.68) | 41.8 (1.65) | 135.5 (5.33) | 272.1 (10.71) | 549.5 (21.63) | 422.0 (16.61) | 254.8 (10.03) | 68.0 (2.68) | 4.5 (0.18) | 7.7 (0.30) | 1,803 (70.98) |
| Average precipitation days (≥ 1.0 mm) | 1.7 | 1.8 | 2.0 | 4.1 | 8.9 | 12.8 | 18.7 | 15.5 | 11.8 | 3.4 | 0.5 | 0.7 | 81.9 |
Source 1: Department of Hydrology and Meteorology
Source 2: World Meteorological Organization

== Transportation ==
Simara is connected with Birgunj in the South and with Pathlaiya in the north by the Tribhuvan Highway. Simara Airport was established on 4 July 1958.

== Media ==
To promote local culture, giving peoples news and entertainment, Simara has three FM radio stations. Radio Simara (106 MHz) is a community radio station and a new FM station is going to be on air soon called Radio Samarpan 98.2 MHz which is testing its transmission.
