= Samanpur =

Village development committee in Narayani Zone, Nepal

Samanpur समानपुर
- Village development committee
- Location in Nepal
- Coordinates: 26.98°N 85.39°E
- Country: Nepal
- Zone: Narayani Zone
- District: Rautahat District

Population (1991)
  - Total: 5,352
- Time zone: UTC+5:45 (Nepal Time)

Samanpur was a village development committee in Rautahat District in the Narayani Zone of south-eastern Nepal.

Just before 2017 Nepalese local elections, it was merged with other 5 Village development committees Gamhariya, Sangrampur, Bahuwa Madanpur, Dharampur and Bariyarpur to form Gadhimai Municipality.

At the time of the 1991 Nepal census, it had a population of 5352 people living in 982 individual households.
