= Bariyarpur, Bara =

Bariyarpur बरियारपुर
- Mahagadhimai Municipality
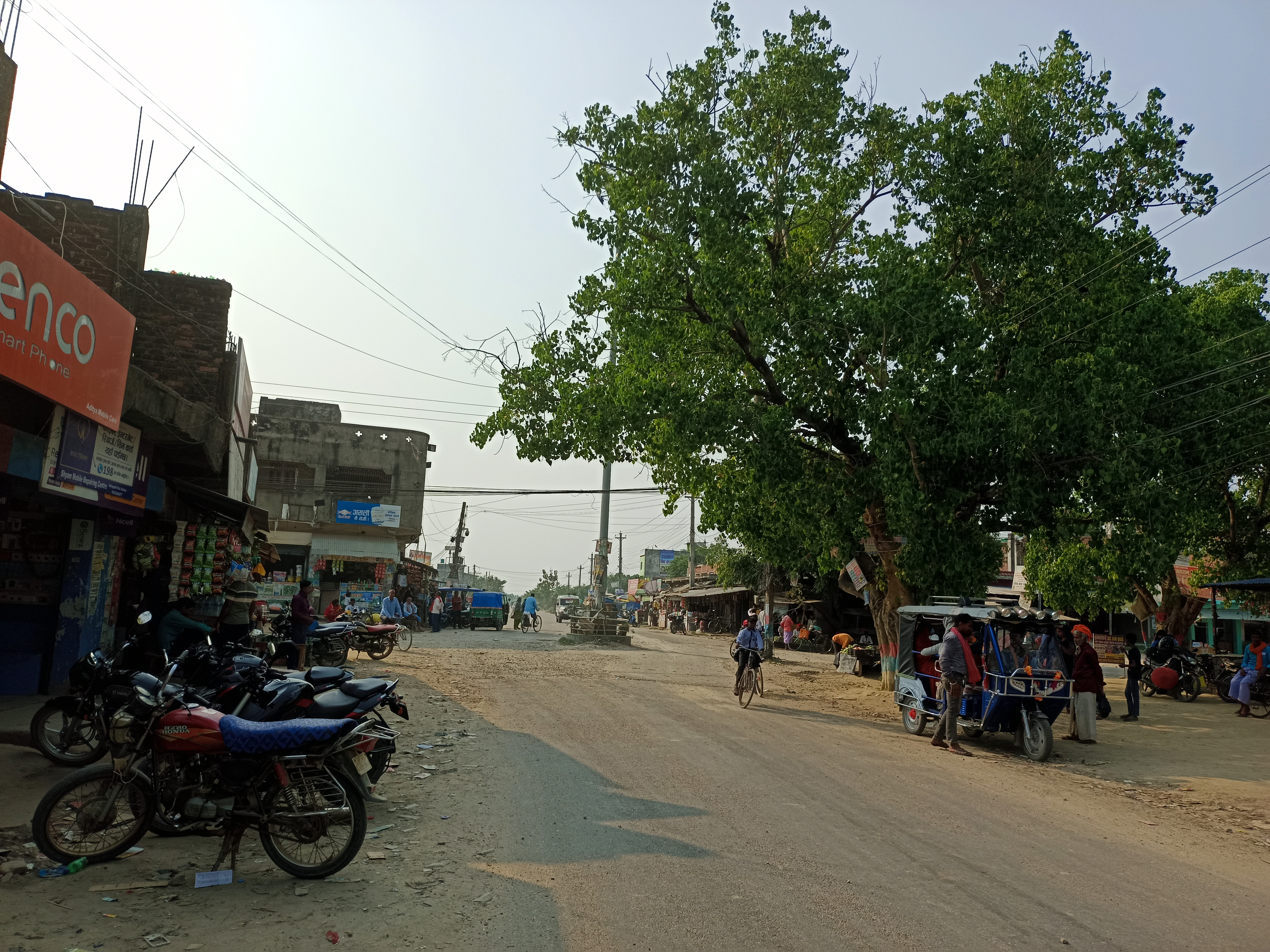
- Nickname: Gadhimai nagari
- Location in Nepal
- Coordinates: 26°59′N 85°03′E
- Country: Nepal
- Zone: Narayani Zone
- District: Bara District

Population (2011)
  - Total: 7,033
- Time zone: UTC+5:45 (Nepal Time)
- Postal code: 44405
- Area code: 053

Bariyarpur was a town and Village Development Committee in Bara District but now it is converted into municipality in the Narayani Zone of south-eastern Nepal. At the time of the 2001 Nepal census it had a population of 10000 persons residing in 1250 individual households.

Every five years, the Gadhimai festival is held in the temple of Bariyapur. The event involves the world's largest sacrifice of animals – including rats, buffaloes, pigs, goats, chicken and pigeons – with the goal of pleasing Gadhimai, a Hindu goddess of power.
