= Bariyarpur, Rautahat =

Bariyarpur बरियारपुर
- Village development committee
- Location in Nepal
- Coordinates: 26.93°N 85.35°E
- Country: Nepal
- Zone: Narayani Zone
- District: [[Bara District]]

Population (1991)
  - Total: 4,600
- Time zone: UTC+5:45 (Nepal Time)

Bariyarpur was a village development committee in Rautahat District in the Narayani Zone of south-eastern Nepal.

Just before 2017 Nepalese local elections, it was merged with other 5 Village development committees, Samanpur, Sangrampur, Bahuwa Madanpur, Dharampur and Gamhariya to form Gadhimai Municipality.

At the time of the 1991 Nepal census it had a population of 4600 people living in 878 individual households.
