= Durga Bhagwati Rural Municipality =

Durga Bhagwati दुर्गा भगवती
- Rural Municipality
- Location in Nepal
- Coordinates: 26.78°N 85.27°E
- Country: Nepal
- Development Region: Central
- Zone: Narayani
- District: Rautahat District
- Province: Province No. 2
- Established: 2016 A.D. (2073 B.S.)

Area
  - Total: 19.80 km^{2} (7.64 sq mi)

Population (2011)
  - Total: 22,599
  - Density: 1,141/km^{2} (2,956/sq mi)
  - Religions: Sanatan Dharma

Languages
  - Local: Bajjika, Maithili, Nepali
- Time zone: UTC+5:45 (NST)
- Postal Code: 44500
- Area code: 055
- Website: https://www.durgabhagawatimun.gov.np/

Durga Bhagwati (Nepali: दुर्गा भगवती) is a rural municipality in Rautahat District, a part of Province No. 2 in Nepal. It was formed in 2016 occupying current 5 sections (wards) from previous 5 former VDCs. It occupies an area of 19.80 km^{2} with a total population of 22,599.
