= Bairgania =

- Town
- Location in Bihar, India
- Coordinates: 26°44′17″N 85°16′25″E
- Country: India
- State: Bihar
- Region: Mithila
- District: Sitamarhi

Government
  - Body: Nagar Parishad

Population (2011)
  - Total: 42,895

Languages
  - Official: Vajjika dialect., Maithili, Hindi
- Time zone: UTC+5:30 (IST)
- Postal code: 843313
- ISO 3166 code: IN-BR
- Lok Sabha constituency: Sheohar
- Vidhan Sabha constituency: Riga
- Website: sitamarhi.bih.nic.in conpbairgania.com

Bairgania is a town and notified area in the Sitamarhi district in the state of Bihar, India. Bairgania is one of the blocks of Sitamarhi districts and is a border of India that links Nepal via Rautahat District through a custom checkpoint. Bairgania is the first town of India that is located on the bank of the Bagmati River.It has a good government medical hospital and experience doctors such as alumni from PMCH. (Note: Formerly also written Baghmati.)

The town in the northern part of Sitamarhi district in the Indian state of Bihar, located near the Indo-Nepal border. It is situated approximately 32 km north of Sitamarhi. The town lies about 46 km north-east of Motihari and around 47 km north-east of Mehsi. It is also located approximately 62 km east/north-east of Raxaul, another border town in East Champaran district. Owing to its proximity to the Nepal border, Bairgania functions as an important transit point for cross-border movement and local trade.

== Administration ==
Bairgania is a Nagar Parishad city in the district of Sitamarhi, Bihar.

The city of Bairgania is divided into 26 wards for which elections are held every 5 years. Chamda Godam on Sultan Street is famous neighborhood in Bairgania.

== Demographics ==
According to the 2011 Census of India, Bairgania has a population of 42,895, of which 22,789 are males and 20,106 are females. The population of children between the ages of 0 and 6 is 7,540, accounting for 17.58 percent of the total population of Bairgania (NP). In Bairgania, The sex ratio is 882 compared to the state average of 918. Moreover, the child sex ratio in Bairgania is approximately 865, compared to the Bihar state average of 935.

The literacy rate of the city of Bairgania is 65.72 percent, higher than the state average of 61.80 percent. Male literacy is around 73.41 percent, while female literacy is 57.04 percent.

Bairgania has total administration over 8,010 houses, to which it supplies basic amenities, like water and sewerage. It is also authorised to build roads within Nagar Panchayat limits and impose taxes on properties coming under its jurisdiction.

== Transport ==
=== Rail ===
Bairgania is situated on the Delhi – Gorakhpur - Bairgania - Sitamarhi - Darbhanga - Kolkata rail line.

Bairgania is connected to several cities in Bihar with daily passenger trains. There are multiple daily connections to Muzaffarpur, Darbhanga, Raxaul, and Sitamarhi, and daily connections to Patliputra, Hajipur, Samastipur, Sonpur, and Narkatiaganj.

Weekly express trains connect to Delhi with stops in major cities in Uttar Pradesh including Varanasi and Lucknow. Kolkata is also connected by weekly express trains; the train being 13044 Howrah Raxaul Express.

There are also direct trains to Lucknow and Varanasi with stops in several towns in Uttar Pradesh. Chhapra, Patna, Muzaffarpur, Jabalpur, Mumbai, Darbhanga, Barauni, Dhanbad, Bokaro, Ranchi, Rourkela, Bilaspur, Raipur, Nagpur, and Hyderabad are also connected by weekly or multiple weekly trains. Delhi is connected via Sadbhawna Express. Previously, all tracks were metre gauge but most have been converted to 5 ft 6 in (1,676 mm) broad gauge. The metre gauge track from Raxaul to Narkatiaganj was converted in August 2018. It is likely that this route will continue to be used by other trains.

=== Road ===
Bairgania is served by buses and trains from Patna via Sitamarhi, Sheohar, and Motihari. In early 2019, a bus route was established between Bairgania and Delhi via Muzaffarpur.

Due to regular heavy rain and flooding, Bairagania-Dhang road conditions can be treacherous.

=== Airways ===
The nearest airport to Bairgania is the Darbhanga Airport, located 108 kilometres (67 mi) away in Darbhanga.

=== Border crossing ===
There is a border crossing to Gaur, Nepal with a customs checkpoint. India and Nepal have an open border with no restrictions on movement of their nationals and no need for visa or passport documents for local people. There is a customs checkpoint for goods and third-country nationals. There are jeeps, cars, tempos (three wheel vehicle), and tangas (horse-driven six-seater rickshaw) that travelers can take from Bairgania station to the Gaur bus park.

== Education ==
The city has primary, secondary, and high schools. The area also features colleges affiliated with Bhimrao Ambedkar University, Muzaffarpur. Students from the area generally move to bigger cities like Muzaffarpur, Darbhanga, Patna, Varanasi, and Delhi to pursue a college education. Many alumni from IIT, IIM, Banaras Hindu University, Delhi University, and Jawaharlal Nehru University come from this area. People from Bairgania have done well in the fields of civil services, state services, central banking, commercial banking, engineering, and IT, among others.

== Religious places ==
=== Shri Bauddhi Mata Mandir ===
It is the most famous temple and is dedicated to the Goddess Bauddhi. The Pilgrimate/Darshan of the Goddess during the festival of Rama Navami is the most celebrated and revered in the region. Devotees from Nepal and the adjoining areas in the thousands perform their darshan & worship during Rama Navami.

=== Shivalya Mandir ===
This is an ancient temple of Lord Shiva made up by the king of Sheohar. The Navaratri of this temple is very famous .

=== Manohar Baba Mandir ===
This is an ancient temple of Lord Radha Krishna.

== Notable Landmarks ==
Patel Chowk (Main Market Place).

Kali Mandir (Major Landmark).

Choti maszid Near, government Hospital.
