= Gaur, Nepal =

Municipality in Nepal

Gaur Municipality गौर नगरपालिका
- Municipality
- Motto(s): Clean Gaur, Green Gaur
- Location in Madhesh Province Gaur Municipality (Nepal)
- Coordinates: 26°46′N 85°16′E
- Country: Nepal
- Province: Madhesh Province
- District: Rautahat
- Municipality establishment: April 12, 1992

Government
  - Mayor: Shambhu Sah (Nepali Communist Party)
  - Deputy Mayor: Shail Kumari Sah (Nepali Communist Party)

Area
  - Total: 21.53 km^{2} (8.31 sq mi)
- Elevation: 79 m (259 ft)

Population (2021)
  - Total: 39,846
  - Density: 1,851/km^{2} (4,793/sq mi)
  - Ethnic Groups: Brahmin Kayastha Bhumihar Yadav Chhetri Brahman Marwari Tharu Koche Rajbanshi Rajput
  - Religions: Hinduism Islam Kirant Buddhism
- Time zone: UTC+5:45 (NST)
- Postal code: 44500
- Area code: 055
- Geocode: NP-TW
- Main language: Bhojpuri, Maithili, Nepali, Bajjika
- Major highways: Birendra Highway
- Literacy Rate: ▲64.6% Medium
- Website: gaurmun.gov.np

Gaur (Nepali: गौर) is a municipality and headquarters of Rautahat district of Madhesh Province, Nepal. It is located about 194 kilometres (121 mi) southeast of the national capital Kathmandu. The municipality lies along the Indian border, adjacent to the city of Bairgania in the Indian state of Bihar.

On April 12, 1992, the government declared Gaur a municipality based on the Municipal Act of 1990. The municipality was established by incorporating then Sawgada, Purena, Sirsiya, and Tikuliya (Ward 1-8) VDC of Rautahat District.

After the federal governance system and the formation of local administrative units, the municipality's territory was expanded on March 5, 2017, to include seven additional existing VDCs. However, due to political disputes, the government stepped back from its decision on May 22, 2017. A notice published in the Nepal Rajpatra on May 25, 2026, stated that the previously added VDCs were removed, and the municipality was restored to its original territorial extent.

Currently, the municipality covers an area of 21.53 square kilometres (8.31 sq mi) and is divided into 9 wards.

== Background ==
Gaur was designated as the district headquarters of Rautahat on December 18, 1962, following the reorganization of Nepal into 14 zones and 75 districts. After becoming the headqaurter, the municipality hosts various commercial enterprises and government offices.

Following the end of the Panchayat system in the country, the then government promulgated the Municipal Act, 1990, on June 11, 1990. The government established three new municipalities in Nepal on April 12, 1992. Gaur became one of the first three municipalities in Nepal to be formed under the Municipal Act, 1990.

== Demographics ==
Historical population

| Year | Pop. | ±% |
|---|---|---|
| 1991 | 20,434 | — |
| 2001 | 25,383 | +24.2% |

| Year | Pop. | ±% |
|---|---|---|
| 2011 | 34,937 | +37.6% |
| 2021 | 39,846 | +14.1% |

Source: Research Paper
Research Paper

Gaur is the 11th most populous municipality in Rautahat district. According to the National Population Census of 2021, the total population of Gaur was 39,846 in 7,235 households. The population growth rate was 1.40% per annum with respect to the population figure of 2011. 55% of the total population residing in Gaur are aged between 15 and 59. In the last decade, the population increased from 34,937 in 2011 to 39,846 in 2021.

=== Languages ===
Languages in Gaur
1. Bajjika (82.9%)
2. Urdu (9.90%)
3. Maithili (3.60%)
4. Bhojpuri (1.30%)
5. Nepali (1.30%)
6. Hindi (0.60%)
7. Others (0.90%)

As of the 2021 census, Bajjika is the most common mother tongue in Gaur, with 82.9% of the population speaking it as their ancestral language. Urdu is spoken by 9.9%, and the other languages spoken in the municipality include Maithili (3.6%), Bhojpuri (1.3%), Nepali (1.3%), Hindi (0.6%), Newari (0.1%), and Sanskrit (0.1%) as their first language.

== Climate ==
Average temperatures and precipitation in Gaur
Location
Gaur
August

(°F)

91/77.9
August

(°C)

23/9.1
January

(°F)

73.4/48.4
January

(°C)

32.8/25.5
Annual

Precipitation (mm/in)

1590.2/62.6

| Climate Zone | Elevation Range | % of Area |
|---|---|---|
| Lower Tropical | below 300 meters (1,000 ft) | 94.4% |
| Upper Tropical | 300 to 1,000 meters 1,000 to 3,300 ft. | 5.6% |

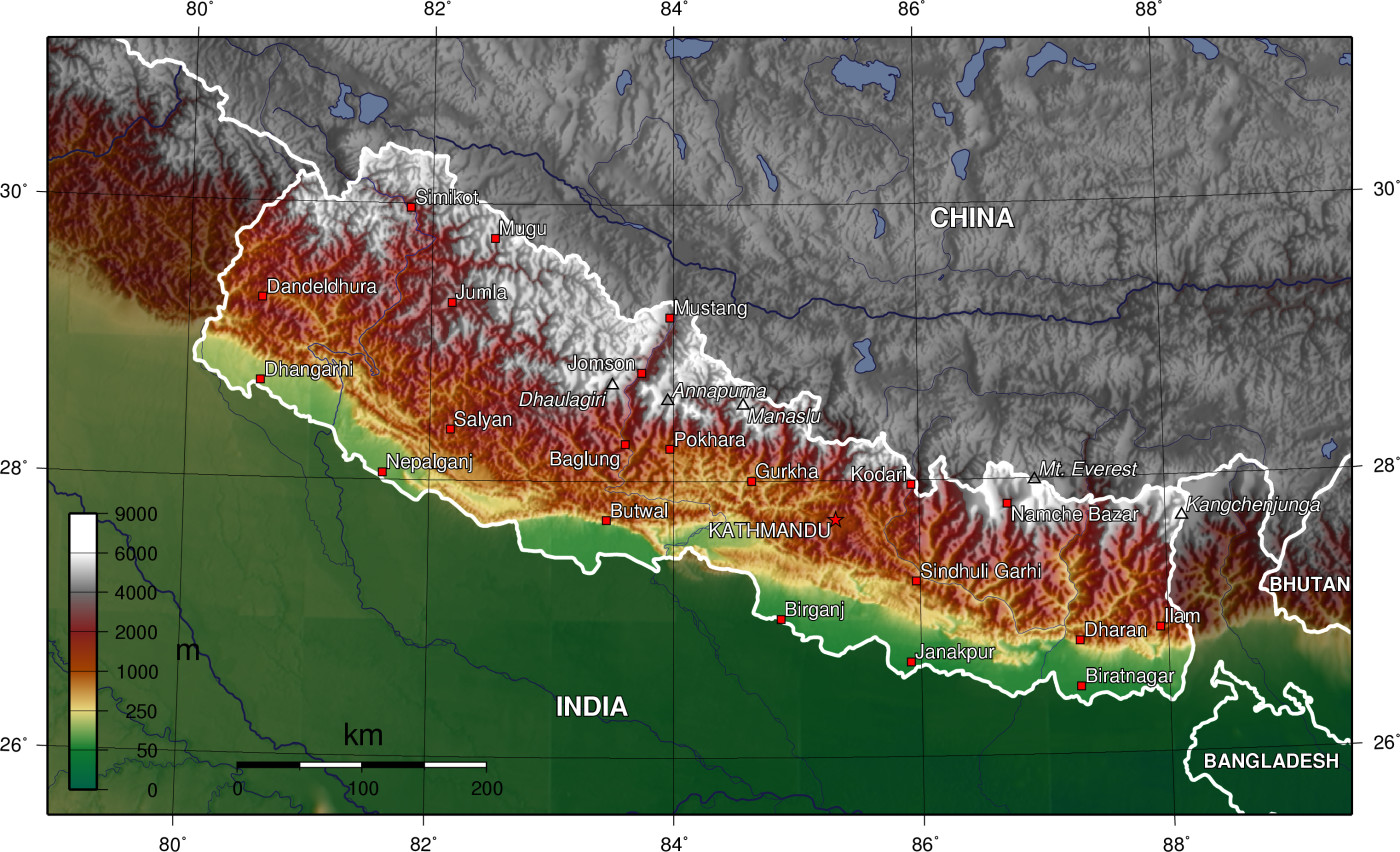
Nepal topography. The green/yellow zones hold the Inner Terai valleys.

The Gaur has a humid, tropical climate. The mean annual rainfall at the Gaur was 2,214 mm (87.2 in) between 1995 and 2006. More than 80% of the total annual rainfall occurs during the monsoon season from June to September. Average temperatures ranged from 8.08 °C (46.54 °F) in January to 34.91 °C (94.84 °F) in June.

In the past, the inner and outer Terai were a formidable barrier between Nepal and potential invaders from India because marshes and forests were infested by anopheline mosquitos that transmitted virulent strains of malaria, especially during the hot spring and rainy summer monsoon.

Gaur, 26°N, 85°E

Climate chart (precipitation, max. and min. temperature)
| J | F | M | A | M | J | J | A | S | O | N | D |
| 9 23 9 | 13 26 11 | 19 32 14 | 53 34 20 | 170 33 23 | 341 33 25 | 559 32 26 | 359 33 26 | 311 32 24 | 89 31 22 | 12 28 14 | 6 25 10 |
- █ Average max. and min. temperatures in °C
- █ Precipitation totals in mm
- Source: Levoyageur
Imperial conversion
| J | F | M | A | M | J | J | A | S | O | N | D |
| 0.4 73 48 | 0.5 79 52 | 0.7 90 57 | 2.1 93 68 | 6.7 91 73 | 13 91 77 | 22 90 79 | 14 91 79 | 12 90 75 | 3.5 88 72 | 0.5 82 57 | 0.2 77 50 |
- █ Average max. and min. temperatures in °F
- █ Precipitation totals in inches

There are several differences between the climate on the eastern edge of the Terai at Biratnagar in Nepal and on the western edge of the Terai at Nepaljung in Nepal to that of Gaur in Nepal although they lies in same plain of Terai.

- Moving inland and away from monsoon sources in the Bay of Bengal, the climate becomes more continental with a greater difference between summer and winter.
- In the far western Terai, which is five degrees latitude further north, the coldest months' average is 3 °C (37 °F) cooler.
- Total rainfall markedly diminishes from east to west. The monsoon arrives later, is much less intense and ends sooner. However, winters are wetter in the west.au in Nepal near the central edge although both lies in Terai.
- Moving inland and away from monsoon sources in the Bay of Bengal, the climate becomes more continental with a greater difference between summer and winter.
- In the far western Terai, which is five degrees latitude further north, the coldest months' average is 3 °C (37 °F) cooler.
- Total rainfall markedly diminishes from east to west. The monsoon arrives later, is much less intense and ends sooner. However, winters are wetter in the west.

== Education ==
=== Shree Juddha Campus ===
The origin of this campus goes back to its former "Shree Juddha Higher Secondary School" and further "Shree Juddha Secondary School", the third-oldest school in Nepal inaugurated by Juddha Shamsher Jang Bahadur Rana during Rana dynasty. The school got its name from his name. The institution has about 1500 students.

Shree Juddha Campus, Gaur

Shree Juddha Campus offers bachelor courses like Bachelor of Education, Bachelor of Arts, Bachelor of Commerce, and other Bachelor courses etc. while its former entities "Shree Juddha Higher Secondary School" offers 10+2 courses of National Examinations Board and "Shree Juddha Secondary School" offers up to 10th class of School Leaving Certificate (Nepal).

== Transport ==
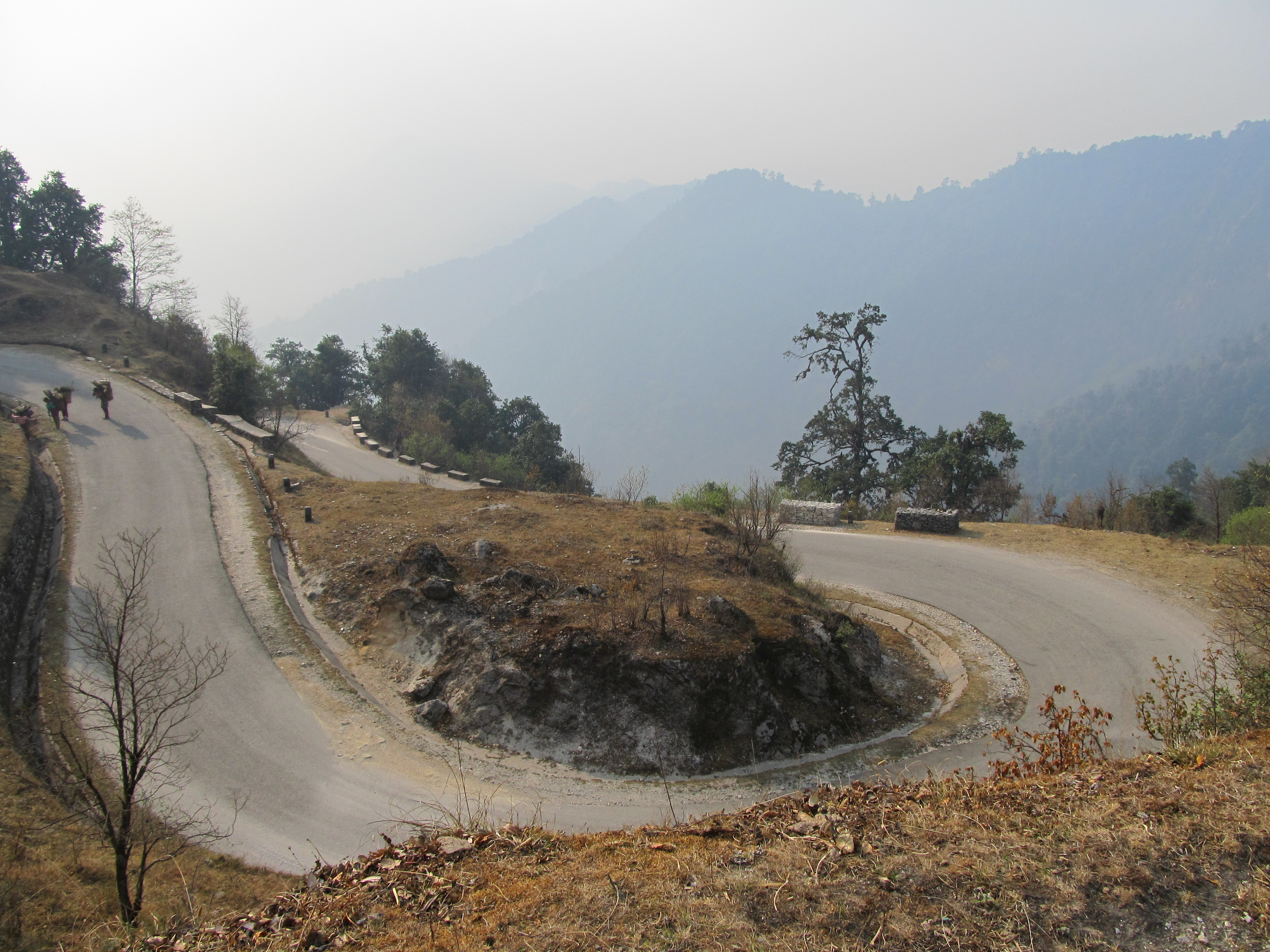
Another view of the highway

Gaur-Chandranigahpur Highway, Birendra Highway, starts there and joins to East-West Highway in Chandrapur which connects Gaur to all major cities of Nepal.

The transport facility is reliable. There are more than 35 buses directly for capital of Nepal, Kathmandu, including 5 Volvo. One can also get direct bus for other major cities like Birgunj, Janakpurdham, Pokhara, Biratnagar, Nepalgunj, Bharatpur, and other city etc.

The nearest domestic airport, Simara Airport, is in Simra while nearest International airport, Nijgadh International Airport is under construction in Nijgadh. Currently passengers use Tribhuvan International Airport located in capital of Nepal, Kathmandu, for International flight. The nearest Indian domestic airport is Jai Prakash Narayan airport at Patna, which is about 177 km from Gaur.

As it is a border of Nepal that links India via Bairgania, one can reach to all major cities of India using Indian Railways available at Bairgania. Bairgania railway station is about 3 km from Gaur and several local transport like Tanga, Rickshaw, etc. are available from here.

== Communication ==
Nepal Telecom and Ncell have network coverage. Ncell has a 4G network for a long time there but now Nepal Telecom has now 4G network. Other cellular network available are UTL Nepal, Smart Cell. Indian network providers such as BSNL and MTS's network is available too. ISPs like Worldlink, UTL Nepal, and Nepal Telecom is available. Subisu is the largest ISPs in Rautahat district.

== Border sharing with India ==
Gaur has its importance because of its border sharing with Bairgania, India also. No documents are required to cross the border. Certain restrictions are enforced on many edible and electronics products and they are properly checked before allowing them to cross.

There is a customs office which keeps a check on vehicles that enter Gaur and have an Indian vehicle registration number. Certain taxes are imposed by the office on heavy products or items entering Nepal.
