= Simara Airport =

Simara Airport सिमरा विमानस्थल
- IATA: SIF; ICAO: VNSI

Summary
- Airport type: Public
- Owner: Government of Nepal
- Operator: Civil Aviation Authority of Nepal
- Serves: Jitpur Simara and Birgunj, Nepal
- Elevation AMSL: 450 ft (140 m)
- Coordinates: 27°09′34″N 084°58′48″E
- Website: simara.caanepal.gov.np

Map
- Location of airport in Nepal

Runways
Direction	Length		Surface
Direction	m	ft	Surface
01/19	1,192	3,911	Asphalt

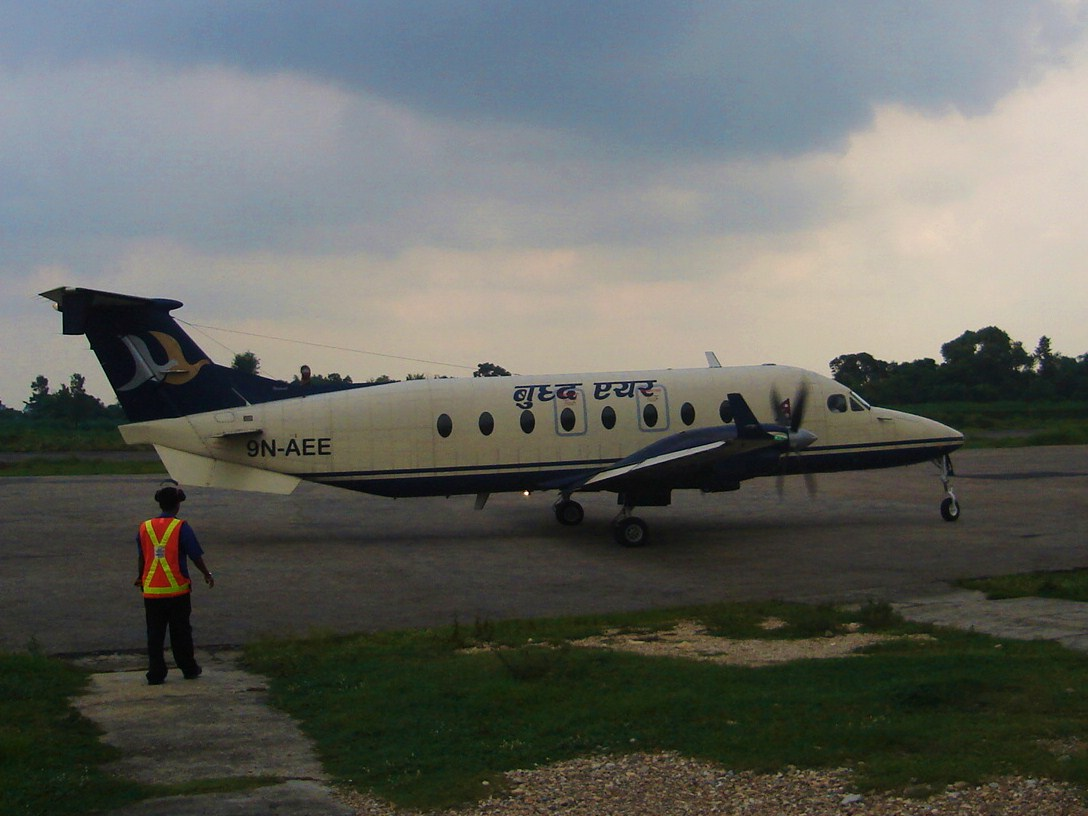
A Buddha Air Beechcraft 1900D at the airport.

Simara Airport (Nepali: सिमरा विमानस्थल) (IATA: SIF, ICAO: VNSI) is a domestic airport located in Jitpur Simara serving Bara District, a district in Madhesh Province in Nepal. It also serves Birgunj, Nepal's fifth biggest city.

== History ==
The airport was established on 4 July 1958, although there is evidence that the airport existed in some form as early as 1946 and would therefore be the oldest airport in Nepal — this fact is, however, disputed. The airport is operated by the Civil Aviation Authority of Nepal.

== Facilities ==
The airport resides at an elevation of 450 feet (137 m) above mean sea level. It has one runway which is 1,192 metres (3,911 ft) in length.

== Airlines and destinations ==
Airlines	Destinations
Buddha Air	Kathmandu, Pokhara–International
Nepal Airlines	Kathmandu
Yeti Airlines	Kathmandu

== Access ==
The airport is located near Tribhuvan Highway.

== Accidents and incidents ==
- 7 May 1946 - A Royal Air Force Douglas C-47 Skytrain overran the runway upon touchdown at Simara Airport and was fully destroyed. There were no fatalities. This is considered to be the first aviation accident in the History of Nepal.
- 30 August 1955 - A Kalinga Airlines Douglas Dakota lifted off prematurely at Simara Airport in order to avoid hitting someone crossing the runway. Two of the three crew members aboard were killed.
- 25 December 1999 - A Skyline Airways De Havilland Canada DHC-6 Twin Otter 300 crashed 5 minutes after takeoff from Simara Airport on a flight to Kathmandu. All three crew and seven passengers were killed.
