= Gamhariya Birta =

Gamhariya Birta गम्हरिया बिर्ता
- Village Development Committee
- Location in Nepal
- Coordinates: 27.00°N 85.30°E
- Country: Nepal
- Zone: Narayani Zone
- District: Rautahat District

Population (2011)
  - Total: 7,766
- Time zone: UTC+5:45 (Nepal Time)

Gamhariya Birta is a village development committee (VDC) in Rautahat District in the Narayani Zone of south-eastern Nepal. As of the 2011 census, it had a population of 7,766 people living in 1,059 individual households. There were 3,912 males and 3,854 females, with sex ratio 101.50, at the time of the census.

The VDC has 9 wards. Wards 1, 2 and 3 comprise in Aakarpathar village; wards 4, 5 and 6 in Bhusaha village; wards 7 and 8 in Bahuary village; and ward 9 in Baragajawa village as sub locality.
