= Bahuary =

Bahuary बहुअरी
- Village
- Location in Nepal
- Coordinates: 27.00°N 85.30°E
- Country: Nepal
- Province: Province No. 2
- District: Rautahat District
- Village Development Committee: Gamhariya Birta

Population (2011)
  - Total: NA
- Time zone: UTC+5:45 (Nepal Time)

Bahuary is a village in the western part of Gamhariya Birta VDC in Rautahat district in Province No. 2 of the south-eastern Nepal. It consists of two wards, (7 & 8), of the VDC.
