= List of national highways in Nepal =

National highway system

National Highways of Nepal Nepali: नेपालका राष्ट्रिय राजमार्गहरु
- NH01, NH02, NH03...
- Map of National Highways in 2021

System information
- Maintained by Department of Roads
- Length: 14,913.09 km (9,266.56 mi)
- Formed: 1956

Highway names
- Numbering system: NH00

System links
- Roads in Nepal

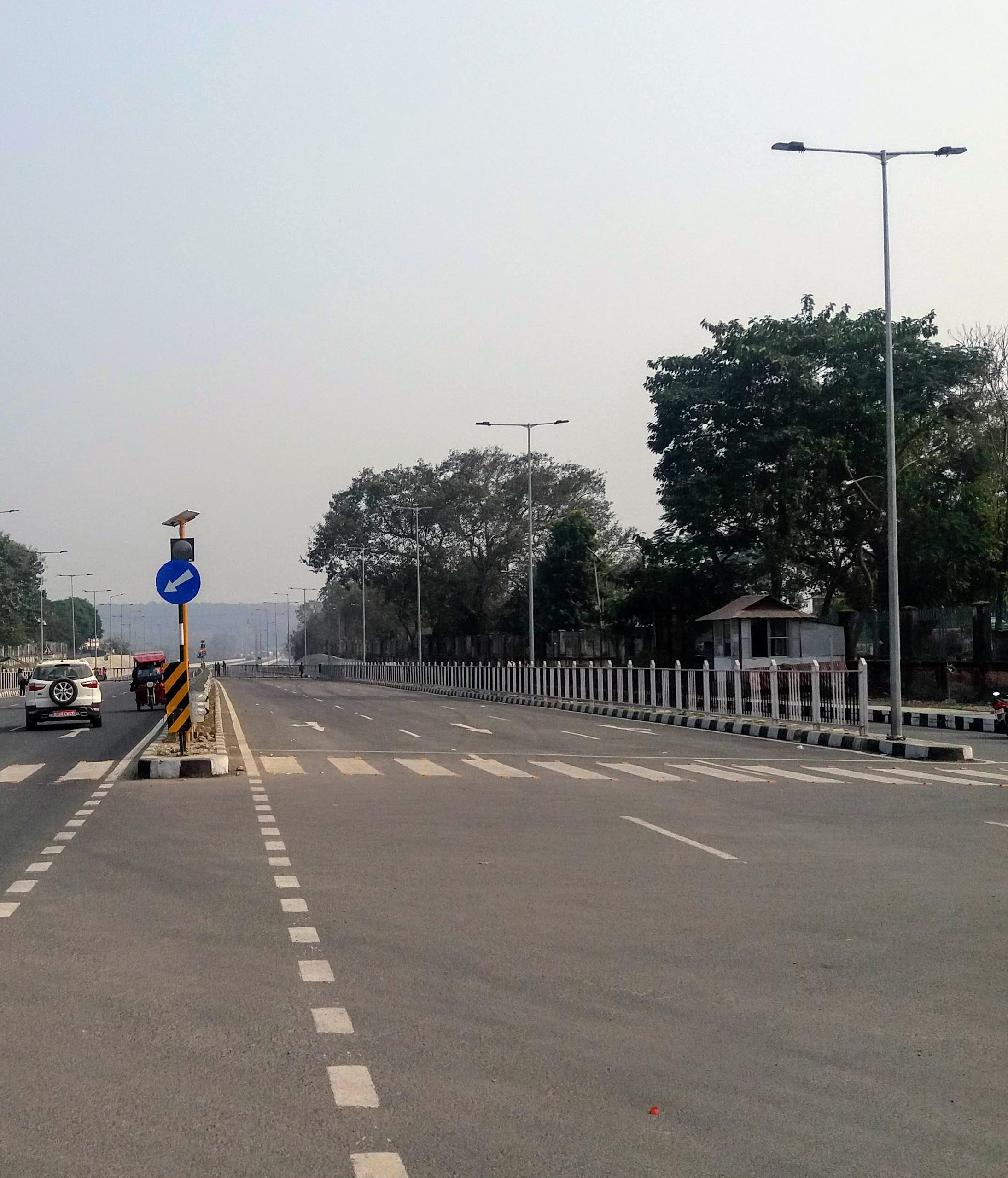
E-W (Mahendra) Highway NH01 at Kakarbhitta

The National Highway System of Nepal is the group of main roads in Nepal. Any highway or road that connects east to west and north to south is considered a National Highway of Nepal.

National Highways are administered by the Department of Roads under the Ministry of Infrastructure Development.

According to the Statistics of National Highway SNH-2020/21 there are 80 National Highways in Nepal, with a total length of 14913 km.

The new report of the Road Department of Nepal "Statistics of National Highway SNH-2022/23" shows that a total of 621 km (385.87 mi) of new roads have been built in Nepal in a span of 1 year, thus the total length of National Highway in Nepal in the year 2023 has become 11,799.09 km (7,331.61 mi)

== List of national highways ==

National Highways in Nepal
Sign	Name (course)	Length (km)	Lanes	Completion year	Status	Remarks
	Mahendra Highway (Kakarbhitta – Gaddachauki)	1028	4-6	1967	Operational	
	Mechi Highway (Kechana – Olangchungola)	352	2			
	Pushpalal Highway (Chiyo Bhanjyang – Jhulaghat)	1787	2			
	NH04 National Highway (Birtamod – Mechi pul)	15	4			
	Postal Highway (Bhadrapur – Beldandi)	1016	2			
	Tamor Corridor (Chatara – Ganesh Chowk)	135	2		Under construction	
	NH07 National Highway (Chatara – Kanchanrup)	66	2		Under construction	
	Koshi Highway (Rani – Kimathanka)	320	2-4			
	Madan Bhandari Highway (Bahundangi – Rupal)	1200	2-4			
	NH10 National Highway (Deurali, Bohoratar)	92				
	NH11 National Highway (Phikkal, Chaubise)	19				
	Sunkoshi Corridor (Ghurmi, Chatara)	163				
	BP Highway (Bardibas, Dhulikhel)	160				
	NH14 National Highway (Kunauli, Basaha)	100				
	NH15 National Highway (Gwarko, Dahaltar)	128				
	Sagarmatha Highway (Thadi – Solu)	144				
	Prithvi Highway (Naubise – Pokhara)	173				
	Pasang Lhamu Highway (Balaju – Syabrubesi)	65				
	NH19 National Highway (Ridi – Pyuthan)	220				
	Siddhicharan Highway (Madar – Salleri)	193				
	NH21 National Highway (Sitapaila, Dharke)	24				
	NH22 National Highway (Jatahi, Dhalkebar)	48				
	NH23 National Highway ( Diktel, Khadichaur )	291				
	NH24 National Highway ( Lalgadh, Bahunmara)	29				
	Bhanubhakta Acharya Highway (Dumre – Chame)	108				
	NH26 National Highway ( Jamunibas – Janakpur)	19				
	NH27 National Highway ( Sitalpata – Sangrahi)	40				
	Tamakoshi Corridor (Bhittamod – Lyapche gaun)	281				
	NH29 National Highway (Kanchanban – Health post)	30				
	NH30 National Highway ( Janakpur – Pushpalpur)	36				
	NH31 National Highway (Dolalghat – Chautara)	25				
	NH32 National Highway ( Nawalpur – Sonbarsha)	30				
	Kathmandu–Terai Expressway (Nijgadh – Kathmandu)	76				
	Araniko Highway (Kathmandu – Kodari)	112	2-4-6	1967		
	NH35 National Highway (Piluhawa Marmat – Martihawa)	25				
	Birendra Highway (Chandranigahapur – Gaur)	45				
	Kanti Highway (Hetauda – Ekantkuna)	86				
	Kathmandu Outer Ringroad (Kathmandu Valley)	68				
	Kathmandu Ringroad (Kathmandu Valley)	27	2-4-8	1977		
	NH40 National Highway (Samakhushi – Bidur)	26				
	Tribhuvan Highway (Integrated Check Post Birgunj – Kathmandu)	155				
	Trishuli Corridor (Thodi – Rasuwagadhi)	197				
	Kalu Pandey Highway (Malekhu – Salylantar)	57				
	Madan Ashrit Highway (Thori – Roila)	300				
	NH45 National Highway (Khairenitar – Kawasoti)	106				
	NH46 National Highway (Bhumahi – Parasi)	9				
	Siddhartha Highway (Belahiya – Pokhara)	184	2-4	1971		
	Kaligandaki Corridor (Tansen – Korla)	254				
	Badigad Corridor (Bartung – Kharwang)	98				
	NH50 National Highway (Jitpur – Khunuwa)	30				
	NH51 National Highway (Taulihawa – Sandhikharka)	83				
	Lumbini Highway (Kakrahwa – Dhorpatan)	222				
	Swargadwari Highway (Bhalubang – Darbot)	130				
	Shahid Highway (Koilabas – Lukum)	211				
	Rapti Highway (Ameliya – Musikot)	169				
	Rara Highway (Tharmare – Rara)	263				
	Bheri Corridor (Bhotechaur – Marim )	317				
	Karnali Highway (Jamunaha – Hilsa)	538				
	NH59 National Highway (Murtiya – Bayuli Nagma)	154				
	Panchkoshi Highway (Surkhet – Nakchelagna)	302				
	NH61 National Highway (Surkhet – Manma)	168				
	South Seti Highway (Khakraula –Chainpur)	228				
	NH63 National Highway (Sanphebagar – Kolti)	111				
	Jaya Prithvi Bahadur Singh Highway (Khodpe – Chainpur)	108				
	Seti Corridor (Khutliya – Uraibhanjyang)	296				
	Mahakali Highway (Dhangadhi – Tinkar)	350				
	Mahakali Corridor (Chandani – Jhulaghat)	201				
	Bhimkali Highway (Bhimad – Arung Khola)	80				
	NH69 National Highway (Jagat Bhanjyang – Chapakot)	42				
	NH70 National Highway (Seti Devon – Ghante Deurali)	46				
	NH71 National Highway (Bhalubang – Kharwang)	170				
	NH72 National Highway (Dumkibas – Triveni)	23				
	NH73 National Highway (Surunga – Lasunganj)	25				
	NH74 National Highway (Ilam – Sandakpur)	50				
	Sworna Sagarmatha Ringroad (Okhaldhunga – Diktel – Okhaldhunga	135				
	Falgunanda Highway (Damak – Rabi)	44				
	Bharatpur Ringroad (Bharatpur)	105				
	Damak Ringroad (Damak)	100				
	NH79 National Highway (Godar – Sindhuli)	20				
	NH80 National Highway (Bastipurchowk – Belsot)	30				

== Proposed highway ==
- East–West Himalayan Highway

== Corridors ==
When one or more roads run along a river, in Nepal it is called a corridor named after that river. There are some north-south corridors which include one or more highways.

National Corridors
#	Corridor	KM	Highway No.	ref
1	Koshi Corridor	385	NH06, NH02	
2	Kaligandaki Corridor	444	NH47, NH48	
3	Karnali Corridor	682	NH58	
4	Mahakali Corridor	413	NH67, NH68	

== Trivia ==
- Currently Mahendra Highway is the longest National Highway of Nepal which is 1,028 km (638.77 mi) long in total length. The highway runs eastmost point Kakarbhitta to western most point Gadda Chauki through the Terai region. After the completion of construction of Pushpalal Highway. It will be the longest highway of Nepal which is 1,787 km (1,110.39 mi) in length.
- The shortest highway of Nepal is NH46 which is 9 km (5.59 mi) in length. It is a linking highway between Mahendra Highway to Postal Highway.
- Probably NH48 (Kaligandaki Corridor) is the highest altitude motorable highway in Nepal. The highway runs on the elevation from 1,000 m (3,280.84 ft) to 4,600 m (15,091.86 ft). It connects Tansen and other parts of the country with Korala (Nepal-China border).

== See also ==
- Roads in Nepal
- List of national highways in Nepal by province
- Provincial Highways in Nepal
