= List of national highways in Nepal by province =

According to the Department of Roads there are 80 National Highways in Nepal. The combined length of the roads is 11,178.92 kilometres (6,946.26 mi) which includes asphalt/concrete and gravel. An extra 487.24 kilometres (302.76 mi) of roads are under construction and 3,050.11 kilometres (1,895.25 mi) of roads are planned to be constructed in the near future.

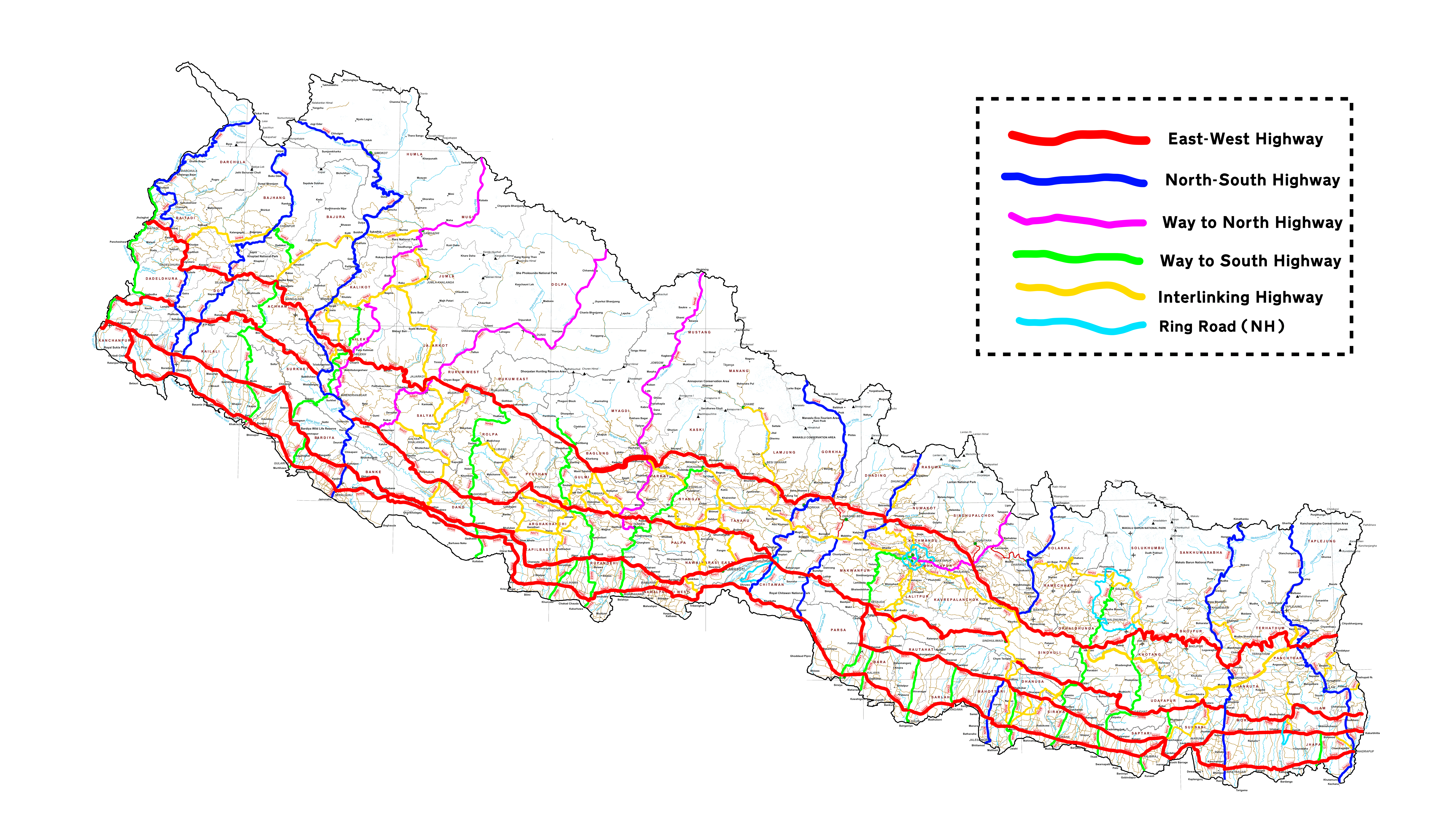
National Highways of Nepal

Summary (2021-22)
Province	BlackTop	Gravel	Earthen	Total	Under construction	Planned
Koshi Province	1274.45	182.38	436.03	1892.86	226.89	861.91
Madhesh Province	544.50	183.69	183.72	911.91	00.00	135.64
Bagmati Province	1362.56	269.02	261.05	1892.63	33.01	422.54
Gandaki Province	535.48	75.04	695.84	1306.36	32.01	191.51
Lumbini Province	1474.72	165.11	789.82	2379.65	94.34	72.59
Karnali Province	664.47	161.00	615.72	1441.19	21.00	671.36
Sudurpashchim Province	1030.26	80.12	243.94	1354.32	80.00	694.55
National	6836.45	1116.36	3226.12	11178.92		

== Koshi Province ==
S#	Highway Number	Length	Terminus	Note
1	NH01	135	Kakarbhitta, Koshi Barrage	Interprovincial NH
2	NH02	352	Kechana, Gharila Pass	Provincial NH
3	NH03	525	Chiyo Bhanjyang, Bahadura Khola	Interprovincial NH
4	NH04	15	Birtamod, Chandragadhi	Provincial NH
5	NH05	124	Mechipul, Laukahi	Interprovincial NH
6	NH06	135	Chatara, Ganeshchowk	Provincial NH
7	NH07	48	Chatara, Koshi new bridge	Interprovincial NH
8	NH08	320	Biratnagar, Kimathanka	Provincial NH
9	NH09	250	Bahundangi, Baireni	Interprovincial NH
10	NH10	92	Basantapur, Bohoratar	Provincial NH
11	NH11	19	Phikkal Bazar, Chhabbise	Provincial NH
12	NH12	163	Ghurmi, Barkhadanda	Provincial NH
13	NH14	40	Basaha, Phattehpur	Interprovincial NH
14	NH16	111	Siswari bridge, Mohure	Interprovincial NH
15	NH20	161	Jyamire, Salleri	Interprovincial NH
16	NH23	108	Diktel, Pekarnas	Interprovincial NH
17	NH73	25	Surunga, Lasunganj	Provincial NH
18	NH74	50	Biplate, Sandakpur	Provincial NH
19	NH75	135	Ghorepani, Basa	Provincial NH
20	NH76	44	Chisapani, Rabi	Provincial NH
21	NH78	100	Damak ringroad	Provincial NH
22	NH80	12.29	Cancer Hospital, Belsot	Interprovincial NH

== Madhesh Province ==
S#	Highway No.	Length	Terminus	Note
1	NH01	245	Koshi Barrage, Chure	Interprovincial NH
2	NH05	310	Kanchanpur, Basantapur	Interprovincial NH
3	NH07	18	Rupanagar, Koshi new bridge	Interprovincial NH
4	NH13	12	Bardibas, Chure Temple	Interprovincial NH
5	NH14	60	Phattehpur, Kunauli border	Interprovincial NH
6	NH16	33	Thadi, Siswari bridge	Interprovincial NH
7	NH20	32	Madar, Jyamire	Interprovincial NH
8	NH22	48	Dhalkebar, Jatahi	Provincial NH
9	NH24	29	Lalgadh, Tulsi Chauda	Interprovincial NH
10	NH26	19	Jamunibas, Janakpur	Provincial NH
11	NH28	42	Bhittamod, Bardibas	Interprovincial NH
12	NH29	30	Mithileshwar Mauwahi, Portaha	Provincial NH
13	NH30	36	Janakpur, Dharapani	Provincial NH
14	NH32	30	Nawalpur, Sonbarsha	Provincial NH
15	NH33	10	Nijgadh, Jaspal	Interprovincial NH
16	NH35	25	Manmat, Matiarwa	Provincial NH
17	NH36	45	Chandranigahapur, Bairaganiya	Provincial NH
18	NH41	28	Sirsiya Dry port, Pathalaiya	Inter provincial NH
19	NH79	20	Godar, Kalapni	Provincial NH
20	NH80	4.11	Bastipur, Cancer Hospital	Interprovincial NH

== Bagmati Province ==
S#	Highway	Length	Terminus	Notes
1	NH01	92	Chure, Narayanghat	Interprovincial NH
2	NH03	270	Bahadura Khola, Aarughat	Interprovincial NH
3	NH05	55	Amuwapost, Triveni	Interprovincial NH
4	NH09	190	Baireni, Hetauda	Interprovincial NH
5	NH13	148	Bhiman, Dhulikhel	Interprovincial NH
6	NH15	128	Gwarko, Patalekhet	Provincial NH
7	NH17	83	Naubise, Mugling	Interprovincial NH
8	NH18	65	Balaju, Syaphusrebesi	Provincial NH
9	NH21	24	Sitapaila, Dharke	Provincial NH
10	NH23	183	Khadichaur, Tamakoshi	Interprovincial NH
11	NH28	239	Khurkot, Lapchegaun	Interprovincial NH
12	NH31	25	Dolalghat, Chautara	Provincial NH
13	NH33	66	Jaspal, Kathmandu	Interprovincial NH
14	NH34	112	Kathmandu, Kodari	Provincial NH
15	NH37	86	Kathmandu, Hetauda	Provincial NH
16	NH38	68	Outer ringroad (Katmandu)	Provincial NH
17	NH39	27	Ringroad (Kathmandu)	Provincial NH
18	NH40	26	Tokha, Budhisera	Provincial NH
19	NH41	127	Hetauda, Kathmandu	Interprovincial NH
20	NH42	197	Thori, Rasuwagadhi	Provincial NH
21	NH43	57	Malekhu, Salyantar	Provincial NH
22	NH44	105	Thori, Mugling	Interprovincial NH
23	NH77	105	Bharatpur, Malhaniya (Brihat chakrapath)	Provincial NH

== Gandaki Province ==
S#	Highway No.	Length	Terminus	Notes
1	NH01	23	Narayanghat, Daunne	Interprovincial NH
2	NH03	360	Arughat, Beni	Interprovincial NH
3	NH05	12	Binayi Triveni	Interprovincial NH
4	NH09	50	Gaidakot, Damara Phant	Interprovincial NH
5	NH17	90	Mugling, Pokhara	Interprovincial NH
6	NH25	108	Dumre Bazar, Chame	Provincial NH
7	NH44	195	Aabukhaireni, Larke Bhanjyang	Interprovincial NH
8	NH45	106	Daldale, Khairenitar	Provincial NH
9	NH47	99	Kaligandaki, Pokhara	Interprovincial NH
10	NH48	254	Palung Khola, Ghoktang	Interprovincial NH
11	NH52	22	Darling, Dhorpatan	Interprovincial NH
12	NH68	40	Bhimad, Dumribesi	Provincial NH
13	NH69	42	Mirdi, Gajarkot Road	Provincial NH
14	NH70	46	Bandkhola, Godam Kusma	Provincial NH
15	NH72	23	Dumkibas, Tribenighat	Provincial NH

== Lumbini Province ==
S#	Highway No.	Length	Terminus	Notes
1	NH01	403	Daune, Bhuregaun	Interprovincial NH
2	NH03	65	Pratiphalna, Musikot	Interprovincial NH
3	NH05	360	Triveni, Khairpur	Interprovincial NH
4	NH09	376	Damara Phant, Bijeneta	Interprovincial NH
5	NH19	220	Ridi, Ramdi	Provincial NH
6	NH46	9	Bhumahi, Parasi	Provincial NH
7	NH47	85	Belahia, Kaligandaki	Interprovincial NH
8	NH49	48.40	Aslechaur, Kharvaang	Provincial NH
9	NH50	30	Jitpur, Khunuwa	Provincial NH
10	NH51	83	Taulihawa, Sandhikhark	Provincial NH
11	NH52	200	Kakarahwa, Devisthan	Interprovincial NH
12	NH53	130	Bhalubang, Darbot	Provincial NH
13	NH54	211	Koilabas, Lukum	Provincial NH
14	NH55	40	Amiliya, Ramri	Interprovincial NH
15	NH58	69	Jamunaha, Harre	Interprovincial NH
16	NH59	50	Muriya, Telpani	Interprovincial NH
17	NH68	40	Kheladighat, Mityal	Interprovincial NH
18	NH71	170	Bhaluwang, Kharsang	Provincial NH

== Karnali Province ==
S#	Highway No.	Length	Terminus	Notes
1	NH03	305	Syalapakha, Belkhet	Interprovincial NH
2	NH09	210	Bijeneta, Bini	Interprovincial NH
3	NH27	40	Shitalpati, Raikar	Provincial NH
4	NH55	129	Ramri, Musikot	Interprovincial NH
5	NH56	263	Tharmare, Sukadhik	Provincial NH
6	NH57	317	Botechaur, Marim	Provincial NH
7	NH58	469	Harre, Hilsa	Interprovincial NH
8	NH59	104	Telpani, Talsera	Interprovincial NH
9	NH60	302	Surkhet, Nakchelagna	Provincial NH
10	NH61	168	Tallo Dungeswor, Jumla Khalanga	Provincial NH

== Sudurpashchim Province ==
S#	Highway No.	Length	Terminus	Notes
1	NH01	130	Karnali Bridge, Gadda Chauki	Interprovincial NH
2	NH03	262	Belkhet, Jhulaghat	Interprovincial NH
3	NH05	155	Rajapur, Chandani	Interprovincial NH
4	NH09	124	Bini, Jogbuda	Interprovincial NH
5	NH62	228	Khakraula, Gothalakhet	Provincial NH
6	NH63	111	Sanfebagar, Okhartola	Provincial NH
7	NH64	108	Khopde, Chainpur	Provincial NH
8	NH65	296	Khutiya, Taklakot	Provincial NH
9	NH66	350	Dhangadhi, Tinkar	Provincial NH
10	NH67	201	Gadda Chauki, Datu	Provincial NH

== See also ==
- Roads in Nepal
- National Highways in Nepal
