= Mahendra Highway =

Major highway in Nepal

Mahendra Highway महेन्द्र राजमार्ग
- राष्ट्रिय राजमार्ग ०१
- National Highway 01
- Mahendra Highway in red

Route information
- Part of AH2
- Maintained by MoPIT (Department of Roads)
- Length: 1,027.67 km (638.56 mi)
- Existed: 1967–present

Major junctions
- East end: Mechinagar; NH 327B (India)
- NH02 Mechi Highway at Mechinagar; NH04 at Birtamod; NH73 at Kankai; NH78 at Damak; NH76 Falgunanda Highway at Damak; NH08 Koshi Highway at Itahari; NH05 Postal Highway at Koshi; NH14 at Kanchanrup; NH05 Postal Highway at Kanchanpur; NH16 Sagarmatha Highway at Madhupati, Surunga; NH20 Siddhicharan Highway at Mirchaiya; NH13 BP Highway at Bardibas; NH32 at Nawalpur, Lalbandi; NH36 Birendra Highway at Chandrapur; NH35 at Gadhimai, Jitpursimara; NH41 Tribhuvan Highway at Pathlaiya, Jitpursimara; NH09 Madan Bhandari Inner Terai Highway at Hetauda; NH42 Trishuli Corridor at Bhandara, Rapti; NH44 Madan Ashrit Highway at Narayanghat, Bharatpur; NH77 Bharatpur Ring Road at Narayanghat, Bharatpur; NH09 Madan Bhandari Inner Terai Highway at Gaindakot; NH45 at Devachuli; NH72 at Dumkibas; NH46 at Bhumahi, Sunwal; NH47 Siddhartha Highway at Butwal; NH52 at Rudrapur, Kanchan RM; NH50 at Banganga; NH51 at Gorusinghe, Buddhabhumi; NH05 Postal Highway at Gobardiya, Gadhawa; NH53 at Bhaluwang, Rapti; NH54 Shahid Highway at Lamahi; NH55 Rapti Highway at Satbariya, Lamahi; NH05 Postal Highway at Kanchanpur, Rapti Sonari RM; NH58 Ratna Highway at Kohalpur; NH66 Mahakali Highway at Attariya; NH09 Madan Bhandari Inner Terai Highway at Daijee, Bedkot; NH05 Postal Highway at Daijee, Bedkot
- West end: Bhim Datta; NH 9 (India)

Location
- Country: Nepal

Highway system
- Roads in Nepal
| ← NH80 | → NH02 |

Mahendra Highway or NH01 (previously: H01) (Nepali: महेन्द्र राजमार्ग), also called East-West Highway, runs across the Terai geographical region of Nepal, from Mechinagar in the east to Bhim Datta in the west, cutting across the entire width of the country. It is the longest highway in Nepal and was constructed in cooperation with various countries. The highway is named after King Mahendra Bir Bikram Shah.

== Overview ==
The highway is mostly a single-lane road in each direction. It is a major infrastructure element because east–west travel was previously limited to the Hulaki Highway built during the Rana regime, expensive and limited air travel, or Nepalese trains and buses. The highway crosses the Terai from east to west for over 1,030 kilometres (640 mi). It connects Nepal from Kakarbhitta (Mechinagar Municipality) in the east to Mahendra Nagar in the west. Bharatpur city and Chitwan Valley are located towards the central part of this highway.

The major destinations along and around the highway are Mechinagar, Bhadrapur, Itahari, Janakpur, Birgunj, Bharatpur, Butwal, Siddharthanagar, Nepalganj, and Bhim Dutta. Other towns on the Mahendra Highway are Birtamod, Damak, Inaruwa, Lahan, Narayangadh, Bardibas, and Chisapani.

South of the highway are five official border crossing points between Nepal and India. The highway spans over 500 bridges.

Infrastructure in Nepal remains neglected despite the very few "highways" that exist. The busiest highways, including Prithivi Highway, all suffer from heavy traffic.

The highway runs through all the provinces of Nepal except Karnali Province. Mahendra Highway touches all the districts of Terai out of the 20 districts except Parsa. It also touches two hilly districts Arghakhanchi and Makwanpur.

The Highway is currently a part of the United Nations' Asian Highway (AH) project.

== History ==
Earlier, the highway connecting the east-west region was only limited to postal highways during the Rana period. However, this highway was not a fully paved or black-topped road. It was only limited to the Rapti River in the west and did not include the 4 western districts of Banke, Bardiya, Kailali and Kanchanpur which were famously known as Naya Muluk. Nepalese were compelled to travel via Indian territory while visiting from one district to another district, be it in Chitwan or Naya Muluk, due to the dense forested region as well as north-south sans bridges. It was precisely to end this dependence on India that King Mahendra initiated the idea for an east-west highway, after whom it is now named. Due to lack of enough budget it was constructed with economic and technical assistance from various countries. King Mahendra had initially requested India to build this highway. However, when India refused, they sought the help of the Soviet Union. India was also attracted after the road from Dhalkebar to Pathalaiya was built by Soviet Union. Similarly, the section from Mechi-Dhalkebar (Jhapa to Janakpur) was constructed by India, while the Hetauda-Narayanghat section was constructed by USA Aid through Asian Development Bank and the Narayanghat-Butwal section by the United Kingdom. Lastly, the Butwal-Kohalpur section was constructed by India. In 1961, King Mahendra laid the foundation stone for the construction of the Highway at Gaidakot. The highway was later named Mahendra Highway in honor of King Mahendra. The highway has greatly contributed to the all round socio-economic development of the country. The highway project started in 1961 and the whole highway was finally finished in 2000 when the westernmost section of the highway was completed. Currently, the highway is being expanded to four lanes.

== Route (east to west) ==
=== Mechinagar (Kakarbhitta) to Dhalkebar ===
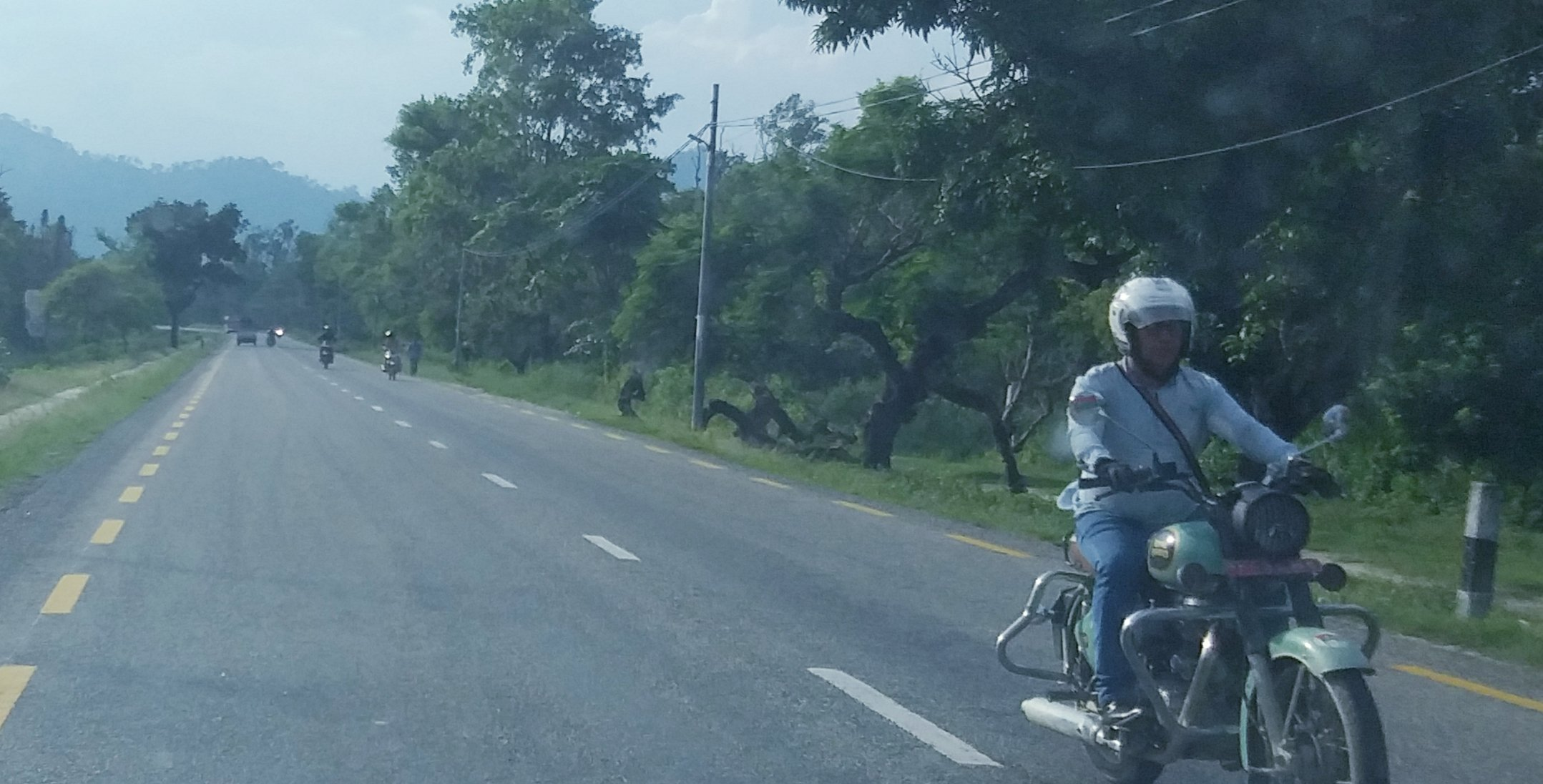
Jhapa portion of Mahendra Highway (H-01)

This section of the highway was built with Economic assistance from the government of India. The construction began in 1966 and was completed in 1971. Mechinagar, in south-eastern Nepal, is on the Nepal-India border. The wide Mechi River, a tributary of the Mahananda River, forms the border. On the Indian side, the road continues through PanitankiBagdogra and Siliguri.

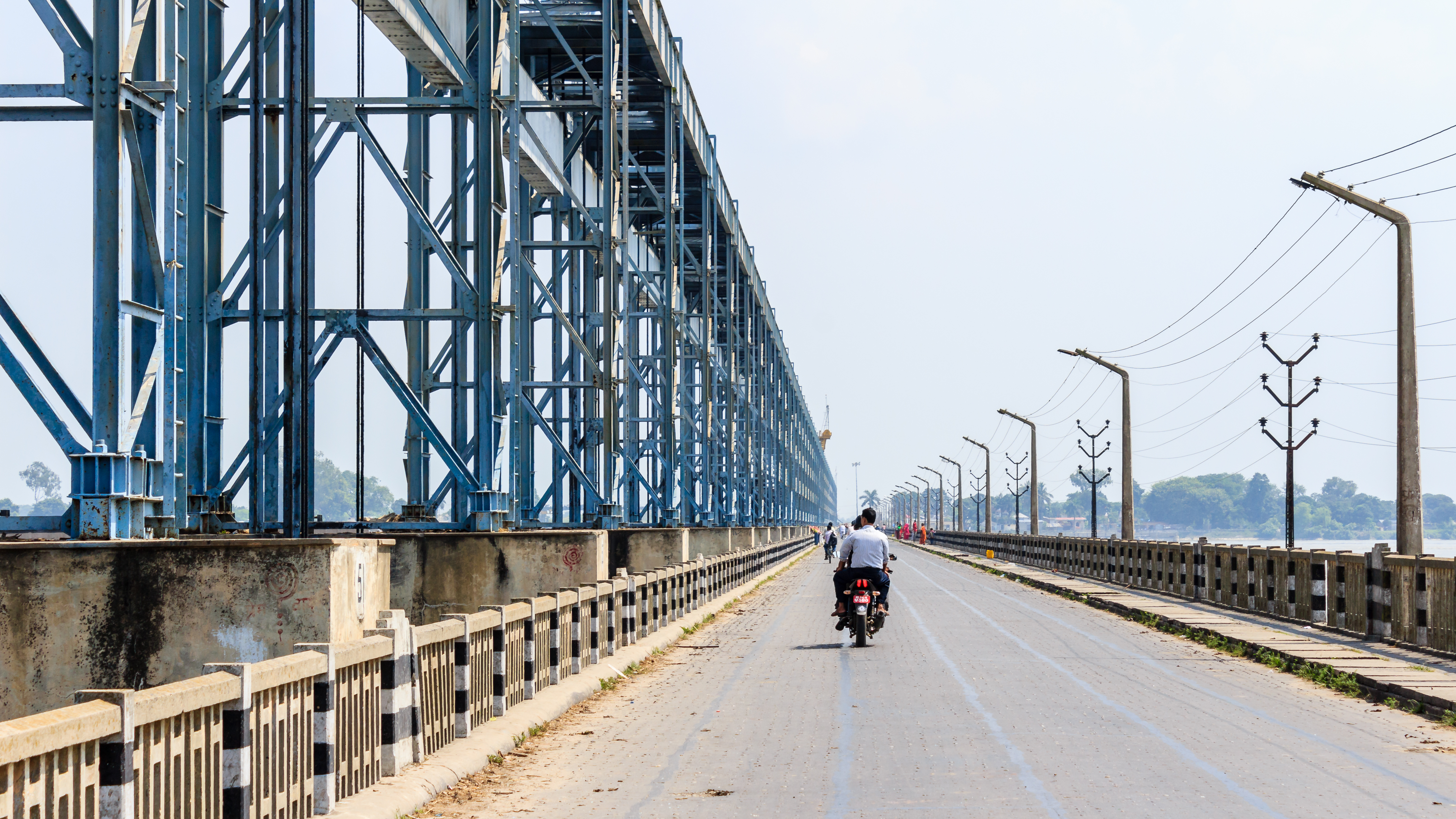
Koshi Barrage

From Mechinagar (Kakarvitta), the highway runs relatively smoothly for 108 kilometres (67 mi) to Itahari. 20 kilometres (12 mi) west of Mechinagar are the junctions for routes to Ilam at Charali and for Bhadrapur at Birtamod. The highway crosses innumerable streams on the way, including Khadam Nadi, 10 kilometres (6.2 mi) east of Itahari, and Ratua Nadi, near Damak. Itahari is the road junction, with Biratnagar, on the Nepal-India border, to the south and Dharan and Dhankuta to the north.

The Koshi Barrage is 42.2 kilometres (26.2 mi) from Itahari. The Mahendra Highway passes over the Barrage between Bhardaha and Bhantabari. Koshi Tappu Wildlife Reserve is easily accessible from the Mahendra Highway. The reserve office is at Kusaha 3 kilometres (1.9 mi) off the highway.

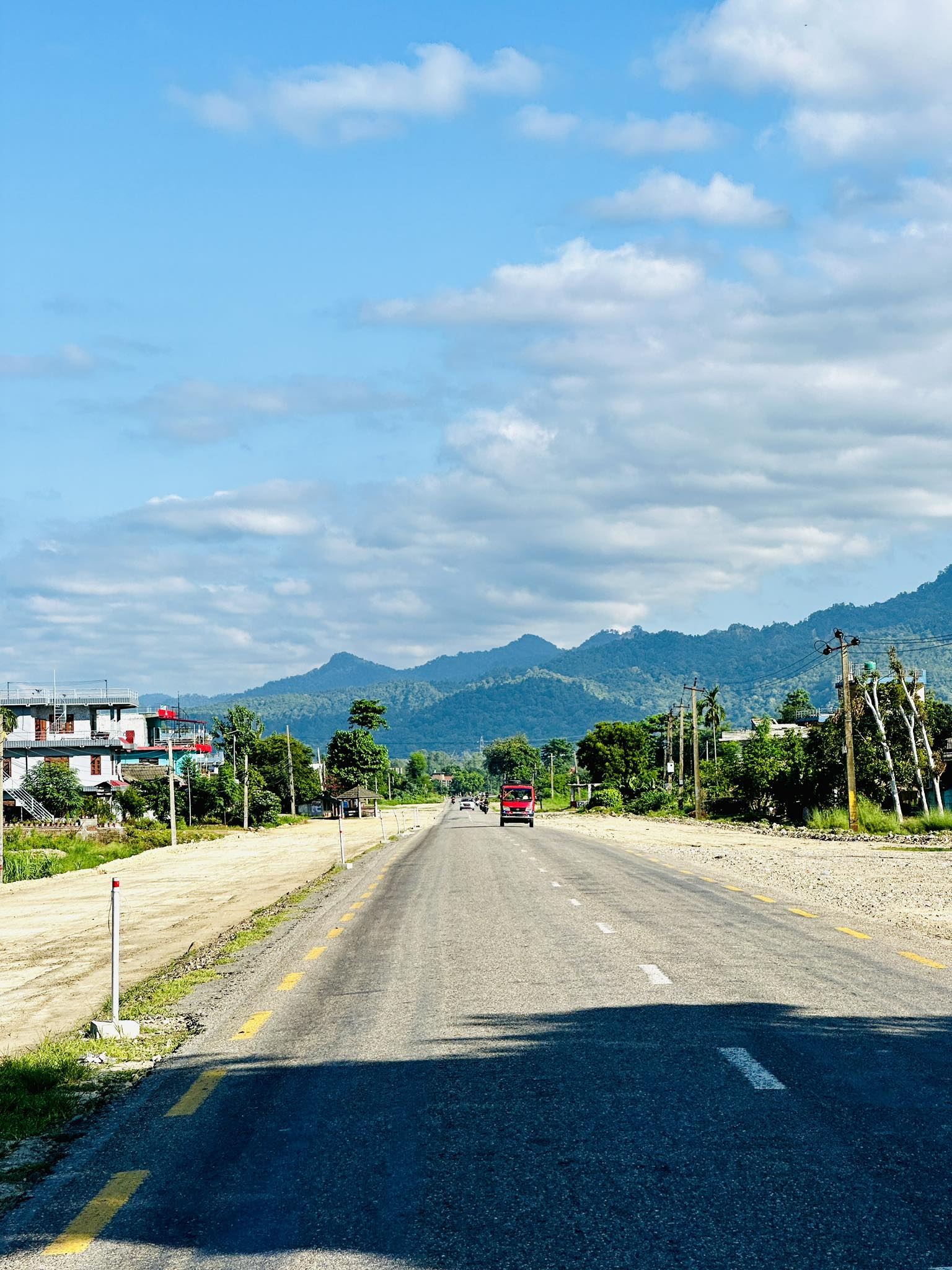
Mahendra Highway in Sarlahi (6-Lane Under Construction)

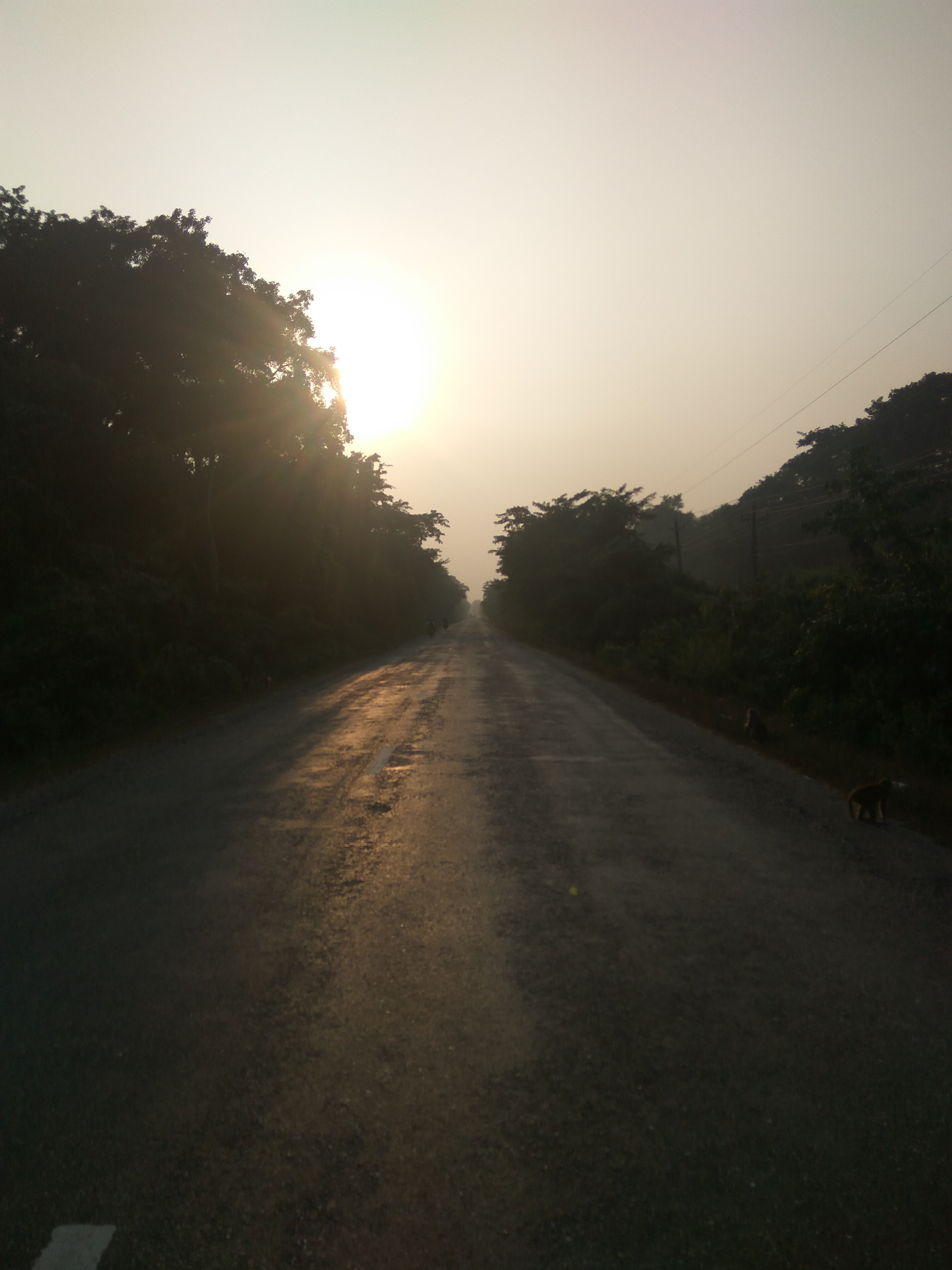
Mahendra Highway at Chandrapur, Rautahat

=== Dhalkebar to Hetauda ===
The Mahendra Highway continues its westward course through the Terai landscape. It crosses the Balan Nadi 43 kilometres (27 mi) before Janakpur junction, and another 14 kilometres (8.7 mi) later, the Kamla Nadi River.

Janakpur, a town with more than a hundred temples, is 169 kilometres (105 mi) from Biratnagar and 106 kilometres (66 mi) from Birgunj. Janakpur lies 25 kilometres (16 mi) south of the Mahendra Highway junction Dhalkebar. Hindu history identifies Janakpur as the capital of the ancient kingdom of Mithila.

At Bardibas, the Highway meets with BP highway which is currently the shortest route to connect Kathmandu with the terai region.

At Pathlaiya, Mahendra Highway reaches the Tribhuvan Highway near the Indian border at Raxaul/Birganj 30 km to the south. Kathmandu is 253 kilometres (157 mi) (by highway) north of this junction. The two highways join to cross the Siwalik Range to Hetauda in Chitwan Valley. The 109 km Dhalkebar-Pathlaiya section of the road in this highway was built by soviet Union while the Pathlaiya - Hetauda Section being part of the Tribhuvan highway was already built completed by India in 1956 however was only handed over to Nepal government in 1965.

=== Hetauda to Narayanghat ===
At Hetauda's Buddha Chowk the two highways, Mahendra and Tribhuvan, diverge and the Mahendra Highway heads west towards Narayanghat. This section of road was built with the aid from Asian Development Bank. The highway crossed Tikauli forest to connect Bharatpur with Ratnanagar. The section meets with Madan Ashrit highway connecting Mungling at Narayanghat chowk.The section ends at the Narayanghat river Bridge.

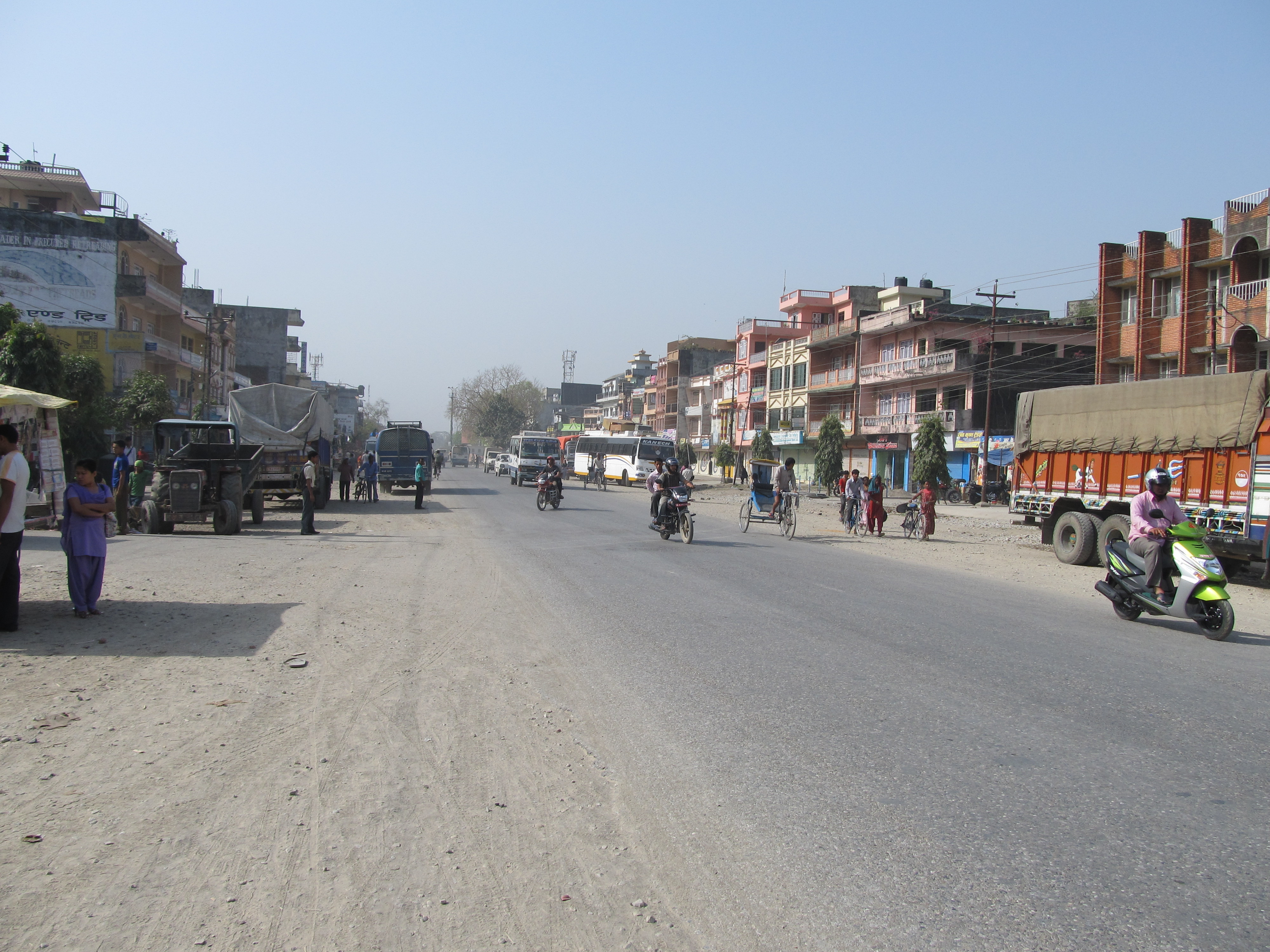
Mahendra Rajmarg in Butwal

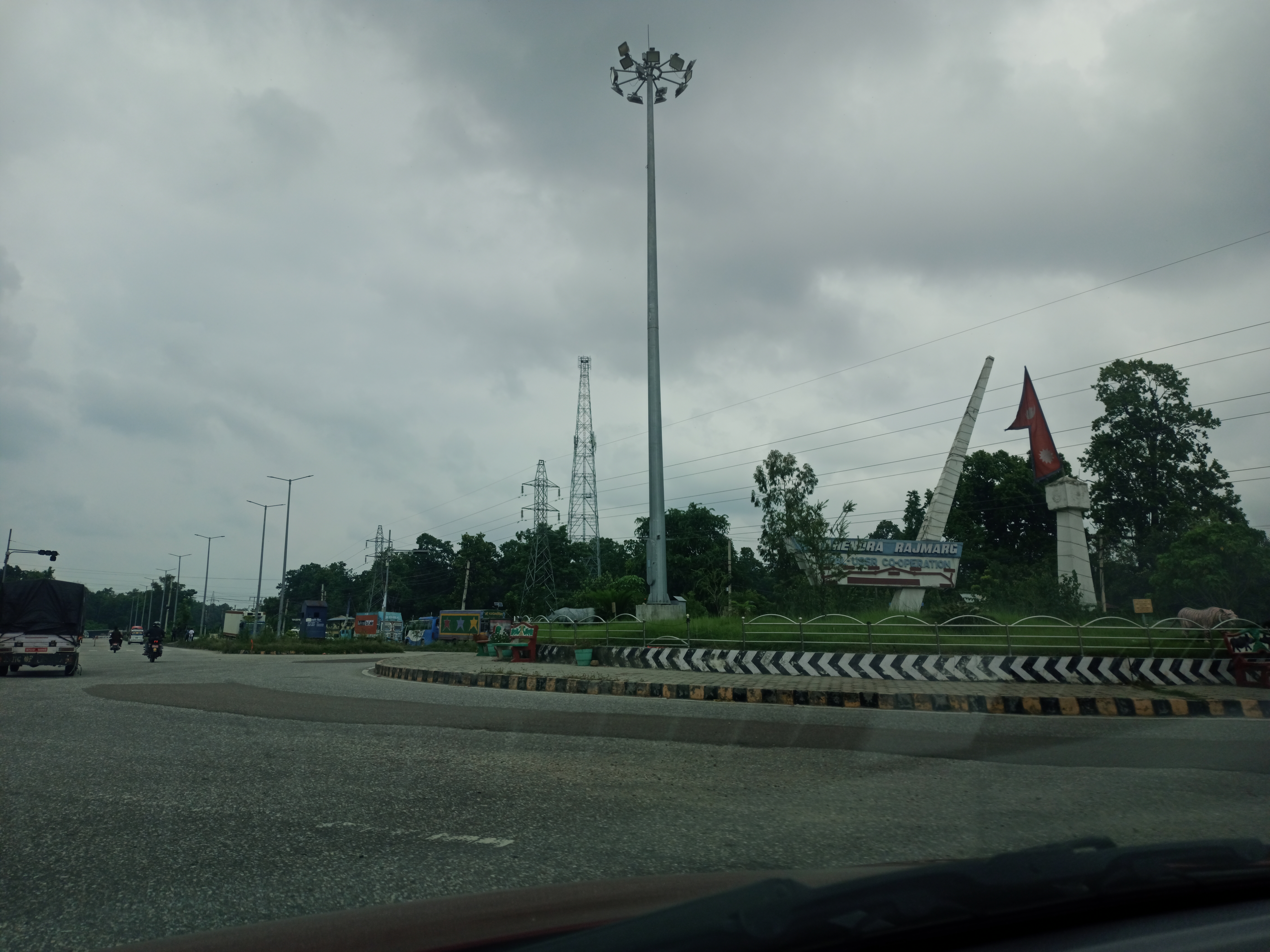
Mahendra Rajmarg in Pathalaiya Bara District

=== Narayanghat to Butwal ===
This section of the road was built with the economic aid from United Kingdom. Butwal is on the west bank of the Tinau River in the shadow of the Churia Hills. Butwal is the junction of the Highway with the Siddhartha Highway, that connects to Siddharthanagar, Sunauli, Maharajganj, on the Nepal-India border to the south and Pokhara to the north. It Passes through Nawalparasi district where lies the midpoint of the highway. The section ends at Lakhan Thapa chowk in Butwal.

The construction was carried out by the Ministry of Public Building and Works, UK. The cost was provisionally estimated at about £4¼ million over 5 years, half of which was provided by grant and half as an interest-free loan, repayable over 25 years.

The construction was divided into 2 sections : Eastern and Western.

By 10 March 1970, of the 75 miles due to be constructed, 30 miles of forest had been cleared and surveyed and

approximately 12 miles were under construction.

By 1972 the western section had been completed and inaugurated and following three years after that the eastern section was completed.

=== Butwal to Kohalpur ===
Similar to Mechi-Dhalkebar section, this section was also built with economic assistance of India. However this section was only agreed after the eastern section was completed. The construction began in 1972 and completed in 1976. The section starts from Mahendra Chowk towards West of Butwal. The highway turns north to cross the Dudhwa Hills (350m ascent) into Inner-Terai Deukhuri Valley, then crosses the West Rapti River, which has no relation to the East Rapti River of Chitwan. Just beyond the river (291 km from Hetauda), the highway reaches Bhalubang, where a spur road continues north into Pyuthan and Rolpa districts. The Mahendra Highway heads west again, following the Rapti downstream through Deukhuri. 27 km west of Bhalubang at Lamahi, a spur road goes north to Dang Valley, Dang Airport, and Tulsipur town. 35 km beyond Lamahi, Rapti Highway departs north for Salyan and Rukum districts.

=== Kohalpur to Mahakali ===
Kohalpur, 428 km west of Hetauda, is the junction for highway south 13 kilometres (8.1 mi) to Nepalganj and the border with India and north to Birendranagar in Surkhet. From Kohalpur the highway passes the Kusum-Ilaka forest, which is being eyed as a potential extension area of Bardia National Park, which lies to the north-west of Nepalganj, on the Nepal-India border. Crossing the Karnali River at Chisapani, the highway continues west to the Indian border at Bhim Datta on the Mahakali River, crossing on a barrage. The section between Chisapani and Bhim Datta is in poor repair. There is a 4 kilometres (2.5 mi) extension to Banbasa, the first town in Uttarakhand, India. Moreover, Mahendranagar-Tanakpur Link Road connects at Mahendranagar connects the town of Mahendranagar to the Tanakpur Barrage from the Highway. There are a total of 22 bridges in this section for which construction started in 1996 and ended in 2000.

== Major junctions ==
NH01 (Mahendra Highway)
| Province | Districts | Junction–Location | km (mi) |
|---|---|---|---|
| Koshi Province | Jhapa District | ⬇ Mechi Bridge; NH02–Charali; NH04–Birtamod; NH07–Surunga; NH09–Domukha; NH76–Damak; NH78–Urlabari | 0 km (0.00 mi); 12 km (7.46 mi); 21 km (13.05 mi); 29 km (18.02 mi); 32 km (19.88 mi); 53 km (32.93 mi); 56 km (34.80 mi) |
| Koshi Province | Sunsari District | NH08–Itahari; NH07–Jhumka; NH05–Laukahi | 93 km (57.79 mi); 101 km (62.76 mi); 119 km (73.94 mi) |
| Koshi Province | Saptari District | NH14–Kanchanrup; NH05–Kanchanrup; NH16–Kadmaha chok | 151 km (93.83 mi); 152 km (94.45 mi); 193 km (119.92 mi) |
| Madhesh Province | Siraha District | NH14–Lahan; NH20–Chauharwa; NH20–Mirchaiya; NH80–Bastipur Chok | 197 km (122.41 mi); 219 km (136.08 mi); 225 km (139.81 mi); 234 km (145.40 mi) |
| Madhesh Province | Dhanusha District | NH79–Godar; NH30–Dharapani; NH22–Dhalkebar; NH26–Jamunibas; NH24–Lalgadh | 241 km (149.75 mi); 249 km (154.72 mi); 258 km (160.31 mi); 261 km (162.18 mi); 266 km (165.28 mi) |
| Madhesh Province | Mahottari District | NH13–Bardibas; NH28–Bardibas; NH32–Nawalpur | 273 km (169.63 mi); 273 km (169.63 mi); 301 km (187.03 mi) |
| Madhesh Province | Rautahat District | NH36–Chandranigahapur | 328 km (203.81 mi) |
| Madhesh Province | Bara District | NH33–Nijgadh; NH35–Manmat; NH41–Pathlaiya | 350 km (217.48 mi); 359 km (223.07 mi); 369 km (229.29 mi) |
| Bagmati Province | Makawanpur District | NH09–Hetauda; NH41–Hetauda | 403 km (250.41 mi); 403 km (250.41 mi) |
| Bagmati Province | Chitwan District | NH42–Bhandara; NH77–Gondrang Chok; NH44–Hakim Chok, Pulchok; NH77–Narayanghat; NH44–Narayanghat | 453 km (281.48 mi); 474 km (294.53 mi); 476 km (295.77 mi); 480 km (298.26 mi); 480 km (298.26 mi) |
| Gandaki Province | Nawalparasi East | NH45–Daldale; NH72–Dumkibas | 503 km (312.55 mi); 539 km (334.92 mi) |
| Lumbini Province | Nawalparasi West | NH46–Bhumahi | 565 km (351.07 mi) |
| Lumbini Province | Rupandehi District | NH47–Butwal; NH52–Saljhundi | 593 km (368.47 mi); 619 km (384.63 mi) |
| Lumbini Province | Kapilvastu District | NH50–Jitpur; NH51–Gorusinge | 625 km (388.36 mi); 639 km (397.06 mi) |
| Lumbini Province | Arghakhanchi District | NH71–Bhalubang | |
| Lumbini Province | Dang District | NH53–Bhalubang; NH54–Lamahi; NH55–Amiliya | |
| Lumbini Province | Banke District | NH58–Kohalpur | |
| Lumbini Province | Bardiya District | NH59–Bhurigaun | |
| Sudurpashchim Province | Kailali District | NH62–Lamkichuha; NH65–Syauli Bazar; NH66–Attariya; NH05–Sama Daiji | |
| Sudurpashchim Province | Kanchanpur District | NH67–Gadda Chauki; NH05–Gadda Chauki | |

== See also ==
- Madan Bhandari Inner Terai Highway
- Hulaki Highway
