= East–West Himalayan Highway (Nepal) =

- Himalayan Highway

Route information
- Status: under planning
- Existed: proposed–present

Major junctions
- West end: Darchula District (proposed)
- East end: Taplejung District (proposed)

Location
- Country: Nepal
- Provinces: Sudurpashchim, Karnali, Gandaki, Bagmati, Koshi

Highway system
- Roads in Nepal

The East–West Himalayan Highway is a proposed longitudinal road corridor in Nepal intended to connect high‑altitude Himalayan districts from the far‑west to the far‑east. The concept has been included in the national budget, with the government announcing feasibility studies across multiple mountain districts.

It is envisioned as the northernmost of Nepal’s three major east–west corridors, complementing the Terai East–West Highway and the Mid‑Hill (Pushpalal) Highway. The project aims to improve connectivity, economic integration and state presence in remote Himalayan regions.

Independent reporting has raised concerns about the practicality of the proposed alignment, noting that several segments consist of incomplete, damaged or non‑existent roads, and that many routes traverse geologically unstable terrain. Critics argue that portions of the corridor were historically developed through local political influence rather than technical assessment, raising questions about long‑term viability and safety.

== History ==
The concept of an east–west Himalayan corridor emerged as part of Nepal’s long‑term plan to establish three parallel longitudinal highways across the country: the Terai East–West Highway, the Mid‑Hill (Pushpalal) Highway, and a northern Himalayan route. Government planning documents describe the Himalayan corridor as a strategic project intended to improve mobility, state presence and economic opportunities in remote mountain districts.

The project received political attention in the mid‑2020s, when the government included the Himalayan Highway concept in the national budget and announced feasibility studies across multiple districts.

== Route ==
The proposed alignment of the East–West Himalayan Highway passes through high‑altitude districts including Bajura, Bajhang, Darchula, Humla, Mugu, Dolpa, Mustang, Manang, Rasuwa, Sindhupalchok and Taplejung. Much of the route consists of existing rural tracks, seasonal roads or partially constructed segments that require major upgrading to meet national highway standards.

Several sections traverse steep terrain, landslide‑prone slopes and river valleys, making engineering design and maintenance particularly challenging.

== Criticism ==
Independent reporting has raised concerns about the practicality of the proposed corridor. Investigations have shown that several segments of the planned alignment consist of incomplete, damaged or non‑existent roads, and that some routes were historically developed through local political influence rather than technical assessment.

Experts have also noted that many proposed sections pass through geologically unstable terrain, increasing risks of landslides, erosion and seasonal disruption. Technical assessments by the Department of Roads have identified narrow carriageways, bottleneck bridges and the need for major upgrades in several high‑altitude corridors.

== See also ==
- Postal Highway
- Mahendra Highway
- Pushpalal Highway
- Madan Bhandari Highway
