= National Highway 71 (Nepal) =

Highway in Nepal

Bhaluwang-Kharwang Highway भालुवाङ-खर्वाङ राजमार्ग
- राष्ट्रिय राजमार्ग ७१
- National Highway 71
- NH71 in red

Route information
- Maintained by MoPIT (Department of Roads)
- Length: 160.69 km (99.85 mi)

Major junctions
- North end: Kharbang
- South end: Bhalubang

Location
- Country: Nepal
- Provinces: Lumbini Province
- Districts: Arghakhanchi District, Gulmi District

Highway system
- Roads in Nepal
← NH70	→ NH72

National Highway 71 (NH71) is a proposed national highway in Nepal located in Lumbini Province. The total length of the highway is 160.69 kilometres (99.85 mi)

== Details ==
The section of this highway in Gulmi District (Khandah-Arkhale-Kharwang) (40.96 kilometres (25.45 mi)) km is formed by connecting the existing feeder road and district road. The Feeder Road F043 and district road DR10, DR11 and DR12 were converted into National Highway 71.

The Gachchhe-Bhalubang section (64 kilometres (40 mi)) in Arghakhanchi District is under construction. Once the Gachchhe-Bhalubang road project is completed, it will reduce the travel time along the existing (Sandhikharka-Gorusinge NH51 + Gorusinge -Bhalubang NH01) road by half to reach the provincial headquarters from Sandhikharka.

Under the Highway Upgradation and Rehabilitation Program, 75 million Nepali rupees were allocated for the Bhaluwang-Nuwakot-Khandah-Kharwang road (NH-71).
