= NH52 =

NH52 can refer to

- All Nippon flight 52 from Sapporo to Tokyo
- National Highway 52 (India)
- National Highway 52 (India, old numbering) which is now termed National Highway 15
- National Highway 52 (Nepal)
