= National Highway 73 (Nepal) =

Highway in Nepal

Surunga-Lasunganj Highway सुरुङ्गा-लसुनगञ्ज राजमार्ग
- राष्ट्रिय राजमार्ग ७३
- National Highway 73
- NH73 in red

Route information
- Maintained by MoPIT (Department of Roads)
- Length: 25 km (16 mi)

Major junctions
- North end: Surunga
- Jhapa Bazar
- South end: Lasunganj

Location
- Country: Nepal
- Provinces: Koshi Province
- District: Jhapa

Highway system
- Roads in Nepal
← NH72	→ NH74

NH73 is a provincial National Highway under construction in Koshi Province of Nepal. The total length of the highway is 25 kilometres (16 mi).

NH73 will work as a Link road between NH01 (Mahendra Highway) and NH05 (Postal Highway). It will also connect with SH99 (B) (State Highway 99 (Bihar)) at Lasunganj Indo-Nepal border. Dighabank of (Kishanganj district) is the nearest town across the border.

NH73 Source
#	Road section	Length	Status
1	Surunga-Jhapa Bazar	20.91 kilometres (12.99 mi)	under construction
2	Jhapa Bazar-Lasunganj	04.09 kilometres (2.54 mi)	under construction
