= Provincial highways in Nepal =

Transport Infrastructure Directorate (TID) or Infrastructure Development Directorate (IDD) is a department in the Provincial Ministry under Ministry of Physical Infrastructure and Transport (MoPID) in all seven provinces of Nepal. These departments are responsible for provincial road and infrastructure in related provinces.

== Provinces and departments ==
Transport and Infrastructure Directorate
#	Provinces	Ministry	Department
1	Koshi	MoPID, Koshi	TID, Koshi
2	Madhesh	MoPID, Madhesh	TID, Madhesh
3	Bagmati	MoPID, Bagmati	TID, Bagmati
4	Gandaki	MoPID, Gandaki	IDD, Gandaki
5	Lumbini	MoPID, Lumbini	TID, Lumbini
6	Karnali	MoPID, Karnali	IDD, Karnali
7	Sudur	MoPID, Sudur	

According to the Provincial Transport Master Plan (PTMP) guidelines, provincial road network (PNRs) are the responsibilities of the respective provincial governments. The ownership of the road network lies with them and they are responsible for planning, design, construction, maintenance, operation and manage the provincial road network.

=== Road designations ===
Province highways are coded with PH-XX-YYY. The PH denotes the provincial highway. The XX denotes the province abbreviation and YYY is a serial number for each provincial highway in a province.

Provincial Highway Codes
#	Province	Code
1	Koshi	PH-KO-001
2	Madhesh	PH-MH-001
3	Bagmati	PH-BG-001
4	Lumbini	PH-LU-001
5	Gandaki	PH-GA-001
6	Karnali	PH-KA-001
7	Sudurpashchim	PH-SU-001

== Koshi Province ==
There are 96 roads marked as provincial highway in Koshi province of Nepal. The following table lists 96 provincial roads in Koshi Province as published in the official gazette by the Ministry of Physical Infrastructure Development (MoPID), Koshi Province, Nepal,

List of Provincial Roads in Koshi Province
S.N.	Road Name	Starting Point	Destination	Length (km)
1	Bhadrapur-Ghodamara-Shantinagar Road	Bhadrapur Ghodamara	Shantinagar	19.054
2	Garhigaun-Jirmale Road	Garhigaun	Jirmale	25.123
3	Fikkal-Pashupatinagar Road	Fikkal	Pashupatinagar Khalsa	10.76
4	Shukhanidigi Chowk-Rajghat Road	Shukhanidigi Chowk	Rajghat	16.094
5	Rajgadh-Laxmipur Road	Rajgadh	Laxmipur	16.621
6	Birtamod-Budhwari Road	Birtamod	Budhwari	12.786
7	Madanpur-Tinghare Road	Madanpur	Tinghare	27.391
8	Manaspur-Shukhani Road	Manaspur (NH01)	Shukhani	12.687
9	Shitali-Rajduwali Road	Shitali	Rajduwali	28.253
10	Kerawari-Kerkha Road	Kerawari	Kerkha	26.304
11	Kerkha-Bakuwa Road	Kerkha Bazar	Bakuwa	14.115
12	Larumwa-Nepaltar Road	Larumwa	Nepaltar	76.453
13	Bhedetar-Chisapani Road	Bhedetar	Chisapani	63.577
14	Daduwal-Pakhivas Road	Daduwal	Pakhivas	37.267
15	Keureni-Tamphulla Road	Keureni	Tamphulla	14.194
16	Pathari-Sikti Road	Pathari	Sikti (IB)	29.129
17	Bahande Bazar-Thangla Bhanjyang Road	Bahande Bazar	Thangla Bhanjyang	70.667
18	Altawari Simana-Padajungi Road	Altawari Simana	Padajungi	28.68
19	Nabalpurghat-Kuwapani Road	Nabalpurghat	Kuwapani	20.022
20	Kuwapani-Likhu Hydropower Road	Kuwapani	Likhu Hydropower	32.154
21	Jor Bauddha-Bakhore Road	Jor Bauddha	Bakhore	46.472
22	Wada-Salpa Bhanjyang Road	Wada	Salpa Bhanjyang	50.82
23	Kerawari Road (via Viratchowk)	Viratchowk	Kerawari	10.913
24	Simmale-Mudhe Road	Simmale	Mudhe	12.76
25	Telia-Jorpati Road	Telia	Jorpati	22.069
26	Sindhuwa-Leguwa Ghat Road	Sindhuwa	Leguwa Ghat	24.021
27	Aankhibhui-Dhode Road	Aankhibhui	Dhode	22.321
28	Chainpur-Khandbari Road	Chainpur	Khandbari	30.326
29	Hile-Boharat Tar Road	Hile	Boharat Tar	54.815
30	Rajnagi-Ranitar Road	Rajnagi	Ranitar	24.412
31	Airport-Diktel Bazar Road	Airport	Diktel	74.531
32	Dipu Toll-Dipu Toll Ring Road	Dipu Toll	Dipu Toll	42.234
33	Bhasme-Kunai Road	Bhasme	Kunai	55.792
34	Ladikatta-Aitawari Road	Ladikatta	Aitawari	26.875
35	Likhu-Dhuske Road	Likhu	Dhuske	72.252
36	Vanchore-Bhyaupokhari Road	Vanchore	Bhyaupokhari	15.175
37	Katle-Budhwari Road	Katle	Budhwari	32.104
38	Rangoli-Chisad Toll Road	Rangoli	Chisad Toll	22.26
39	Ravi-Ranke Bhanjyang Road	Ravi	Ranke Bhanjyang	22.822
40	Pathari-Rangeli Road	Pathari Refugee Camp	Rangeli	26.342
41	Shyamsila-Zero Point Road	Shyamsila Yalambar Chowk	Zero Point	12.149
42	Chiprid-Semle Road	Chiprid	Semle	10.643
43	Satisale-Gagane Road	Satisale	Gagane	68.817
44	Kanepokhari-Gadergaun Road	Kanepokhari	Gadergaun	36.746
45	Manglabare-Ramite Road	Manglabare	Ramite	23.599
46	Dewanganj-Devkota Chowk Road	Dewanganj	Devkota Chowk	16.029
47	Ramite-Dashami Road	Ramite	Dashami	21.426
48	Pikhuwakhola-Pangmakham Road	Pikhuwakhola	Pangmakham	37.817
49	Seti Vagar-Baghkhor Road	Seti Vagar	Baghkhor	[Length missing]
50	India Border-Jhilphile Road	India Border	Jhilphile	21.09
51	Rajgadh-Armani Birtabazar Road	Rajgadh	Armani Birtabazar	15.431
52	Ranitar-Papmakham Road	Ranitar	Papmakham	108.206
53	Pathari-Shikharpur Road	Pathari	Shikharpur	15.769
54	Falamdunga-Temke Danda Road	Falamdunga	Temke Danda	63.985
55	Belwari-Letad Road	Belwari	Letad	12.303
56	Letad-Aruvote Road	Letad	Aruvote	17.652
57	Murkuchi-Chilaune Bhanjyang Road	Murkuchi	Chilaune Bhanjyang	23.747
58	Duhabi-Inaruwa Road	Duhabi	Inaruwa	15.097
59	Ikhuwa Khola-Bhandari Gaun Road	Ikhuwa Khola	Bhandari Gaun	39.242
60	Gadithumka-Barbote Road	Gadithumka	Barbote	42.466
61	Trishuli-Jitpur Danda Road	Trishuli	Jitpur Danda	19.144
62	Aamwari-Daregaunda Road	Aamwari	Daregaunda	58.045
63	Rasuwa Ghat-Bange Bazar Road	Rasuwa Ghat	Bange Bazar	64.866
64	Ranibash-Pakhivas Road	Ranibash	Pakhivas	37.952
65	Hangbupa Bhanjyang-Hile Road	Hangbupa Bhanjyang	Hile	36.605
66	Shikhar Kateri-Mudhe Road	Shikhar Kateri	Mudhe	21.731
67	Okharbote-Jirikhimti Road	Okharbote	Jirikhimti	50.142
68	Rambeni-Nundhaki Road	Rambeni	Nundhaki	30.169
69	Tharpu-Yamphudin Road	Tharpu	Yamphudin	8.651
70	Leguwa-Lakuwa Road	Leguwa	Lakuwa	199.092
71	Phorahat-Viratchowk Road	Phorahat	Viratchowk	17.536
72	Chawlar Kharka-Solududhkund Road	Chawlar Kharka	Solududhkund	26.412
73	Leti-Yarmkhu Road	Leti	Yarmkhu	56.835
74	Pyawuli-Bhyaupokhari Road	Pyawuli	Bhyaupokhari	14.297
75	Mudhe Bisani-Chailung Road	Mudhe Bisani	Chailung	20.579
76	Kerud Palle-Tumse Road	Kerud Palle	Tumse	43.208
77	Keroun-Chatara Road	Keroun	Chatara	51.979
78	Duhabi-Amardaha Road	Duhabi	Amardaha	34.219
79	Jayaramghat-Rabuwa Road	Jayaramghat	Rabuwa	27.205
80	Bhyaupokhari-Didla Bazar Road	Bhyaupokhari	Didla Bazar	11.51
81	Khyatud-Mafkhark Road	Khyatud	Mafkhark	19.253
82	Osangu Bazar-Hiledanda Road	Osangu Bazar	Hiledanda	26.395
83	Dandagau-Kartikay Road	Dandagau	Kartikay	31.234
84	Mohanpur-Fikaldanda Road	Mohanpur	Fikaldanda	23.389
85	Salbisawne-Fakchamara Road	Salbisawne	Fakchamara	14.631
86	Deurali-Telok Road	Deurali	Telok	30.4
87	Maunabudhuk-Gadhigaun Road	Maunabudhuk	Gadhigaun	15.786
88	Madibud-Ambote Road	Madibud	Ambote	21.025
89	Parpani-Chyangre Road	Parpani	Chyangre	13.558
90	Dhaplaighat Bazar-Chisapani Road	Dhaplaighat Bazar	Chisapani	36.155
91	Jarayotar-Pokhari Road	Jarayotar	Pokhari	16.606
92	Shivalaya Chowk-Gajurmukhi Dham Road	Shivalaya Chowk	Gajurmukhi Dham	17.271
93	Dipu Toll-Bagaha Chowk Road	Dipu Toll	Bagaha Chowk	20.676
94	Diyale-Vaitud Road	Diyale	Vaitud	19.096
95	Urlabari-Ramite Road	Urlabari	Ramite	21.789
96	Nayabazar-Pidarwani Road	Nayabazar	Pidarwani	11.302

== Madhesh Province ==
There are 68 Provincial Highway in Madhesh:

#	Highway No.	Name	Termini	Length
1	PH-MH-001-01	Madhesh Sahid Marga	Koshi Barrage-Pakari Khado River	18.598
2	PH-MH-001-02	Madhesh Sahid Marga	Dighawa Khado River-Chakadaha Balan River	44.746
3	PH-MH-001-03	Madhesh Sahid Marga	Ramnagar Balan River-Chikna Kamala River	48.768
4	PH-MH-001-04	Madhesh Sahid Marga	Paterwa Kamala River-Matahi	7.149
5	PH-MH-001-05	Madhesh Sahid Marga	Sapshi- Gajariya	3.906
6	PH-MH-001-06	Madhesh Sahid Marga	Chandrapur-Gaushala-Brahamsthan Hardi Nadi	28.298
7	PH-MH-001-07	Madhesh Sahid Marga	Srinagar Hardi Nadi-Barahatwa- Bagmati River	46.607
8	PH-MH-001-08	Madhesh Sahid Marga	Samanpur Bagmati River- Garuda	9.900
9	PH-MH-001-09	Madhesh Sahid Marga	Garuda Laxmipur-Malahi	16.048
10	PH-MH-001-10	Madhesh Sahid Marga	Malahi- Kalaiya-Bhaluhi	25.189
11	PH-MH-001-11	Madhesh Sahid Marga	Parshauni-Chomi	10.297
12	PH-MH-001-12	Madhesh Sahid Marga	Chomi- Salakpur-Basantapur	34.535
13	PH-MH-002		Jandaul-Bagmati-Barathawa-Kunauli Border	26.382
14	PH-MH-003		Topa Bazar Khado Khola-Hanuman Nagar-Bhardaha	13.443
15	PH-MH-004		Rajbiraj Khado Khola-Tilathi Koiladi Ga.Pa.	12.488
16	PH-MH-005		Rajbiraj- Rupani MRM	10.240
17	PH-MH-006		Rajbiraj Bishnupur Ga.Pa. -Chhinamasta Ga.Pa- India Border	18.108

== Bagmati Province ==
Under the Provincial Road Act 2021 (प्रदेश सार्वजनिक ऐन, २०७८) the Bagmati government has identified provincial highways and roads.

In Bagmati Province, there are currently a total of 20 Provincial Highways spanning 1011 kilometers (628 miles). These highways form crucial connections and facilitate transportation within the province.

=== Highway ===
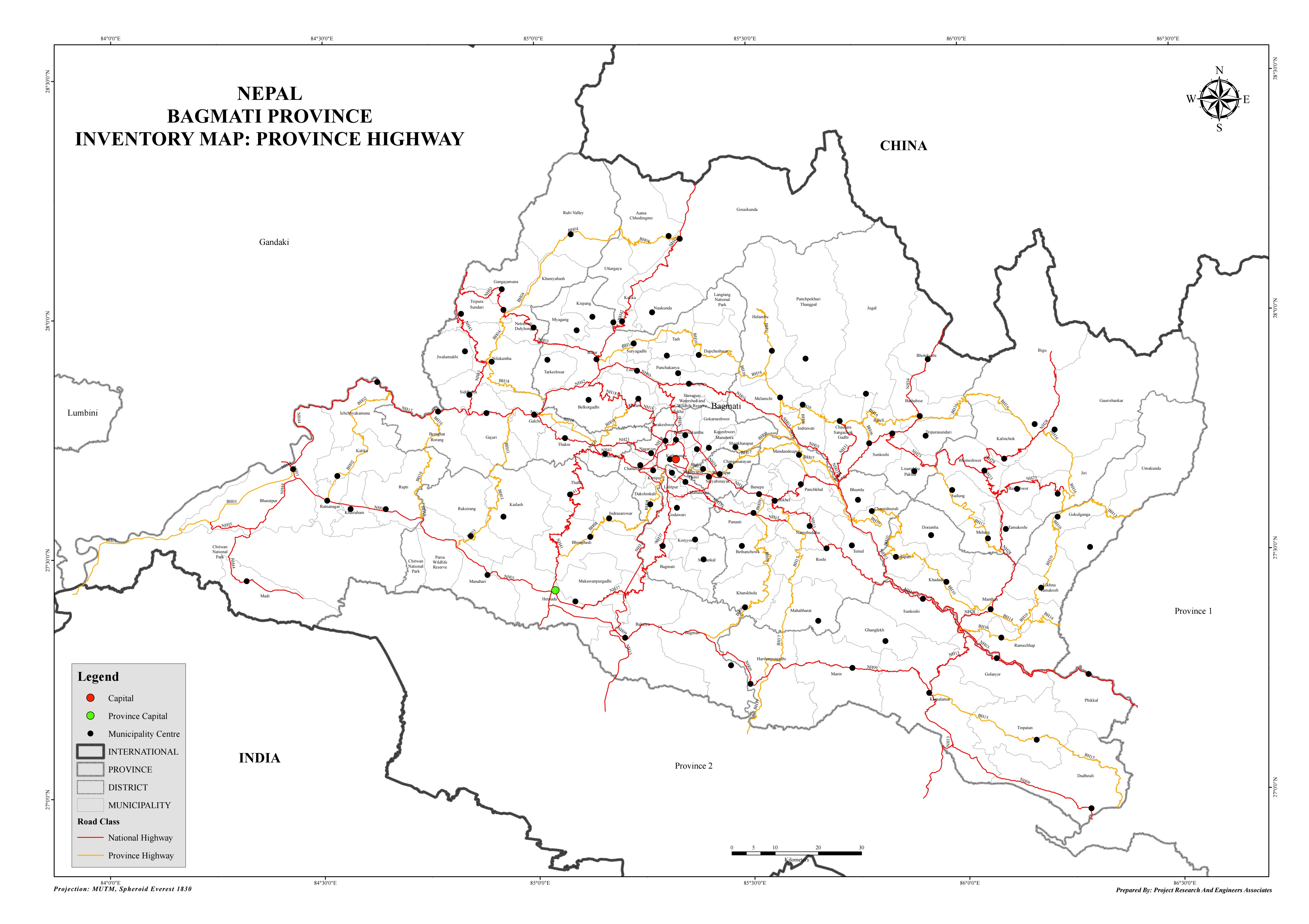
Bagmati Provincial Highway with National Highway

There are 20 Provincial Highway in Bagmati:

#	Highway No.	Name	Termini	Length
1	PH-BG-001		Baguwa-Pyutar-Gimdi-Manthali-Shrikhandapur-Hattisude	47 kilometres (29 mi)
2	PH-BG-002		Bakultar(Ratnanagar)-Jutpani, Shaktikhor-Baspur-Fisling	60 kilometres (37 mi)
3	PH-BG-003		Balaju-Nepaltar-Sangla	9 kilometres (5.6 mi)
4	PH-BG-004	Rajdhani P. Highway	Balkhu-Kulekhani-Bhaise	67 kilometres (42 mi)
5	PH-BG-005		Zero kilo-Melamchi-Melamchi Ghyang	60 kilometres (37 mi)
6	PH-BG-006		Chaubiskoti(Ratnanagar)-Dibyanagar-Golaghat	28 kilometres (17 mi)
7	PH-BG-007		Sindhulimati-Katari	81 kilometres (50 mi)
8	PH-BG-008		Tinpiple-Okharpauwa-Galchi	51 kilometres (32 mi)
9	PH-BG-009		Dhadingbesi-Kafalpani-Mandredhunga	46 kilometres (29 mi)
10	PH-BG-010		Dolalghat-Gurashe-Manthali	95 kilometres (59 mi)
11	PH-BG-011		Sukute-Ekkaish Kilo-Lisankhu	39 kilometres (24 mi)
12	PH-BG-012	Janmukti P. Highway	Pingthali-Devitar-Taldhunga Sikredobhan	84 kilometres (52 mi)
13	PH-BG-013		Sallaghari-Kharipati-Dolalghat	56 kilometres (35 mi)
14	PH-BG-014		Kamaiya-Hakpara-Madan Bhandari National Highway	16 kilometres (9.9 mi)
15	PH-BG-015	Maitri Provincial Highway	Kathmandu-Sipaghat-Balephi	64 kilometres (40 mi)
16	PH-BG-016		Khimti-Rasnalu-Jiri	42 kilometres (26 mi)
17	PH-BG-017	Ganeshman Singh P. Highway	Kunchal-Chitlang-Thankot Checkpost	29 kilometres (18 mi)
18	PH-BG-018	Manmohan P. Highway	Chabahil-Sankhu-Fatkeshwor	33 kilometres (21 mi)
19	PH-BG-019	Mukundasen P. Highway	Dhading Besi-Mandredhunga-Trishuli	51 kilometres (32 mi)
20	PH-BG-021		Mude-Melung-Sitalli	52 kilometres (32 mi)

=== Road ===
In Bagmati Province, there are a total of 230 provincial roads with a combined length of 5,332 kilometers (3,313 miles). These roads play a critical role in ensuring connectivity and facilitating transportation within the region.

== Lumbini Province ==
There are 15 provincial highway (PH) in Lumbini Province.

#	Highway No.	Name	Termini	Length

== See also ==
- Roads in Nepal
- List of national highways in Nepal by province
