= National Highway 72 (Nepal) =

Highway in Nepal

Dumkibas-Triveni Highway दुम्किबास-त्रिवेणी राजमार्ग
- राष्ट्रिय राजमार्ग ७२
- National Highway 72
- NH72 in red

Route information
- Maintained by MoPIT (Department of Roads)
- Length: 20.95 km (13.02 mi)

Major junctions
- North end: Dumkibas
- South end: Tribeni

Location
- Country: Nepal
- Provinces: Gandaki Province
- Districts: Nawalparasi East

Highway system
- Roads in Nepal
← NH71	→ NH73

National Highway 72 (NH72) is a national highway in Nepal, located in Nawalparasi East of Gandaki Province. The total length of the highway is 20.95 km (13.02 mi)
