= Charali (Nepal) =

Coordinates: 26°39′08″N 88°03′13″E

Charali (Nepali: चारआली) is a neighbourhood in the municipality of Mechinagar, Jhapa district in Nepal. The place lies at the intersection of East–west highway and Mechi Highway that traverses from South to North. It serves as a major entry point for the eastern hills of Nepal.
