= West Rapti River =

River in Nepal

West Rapti Kuwano
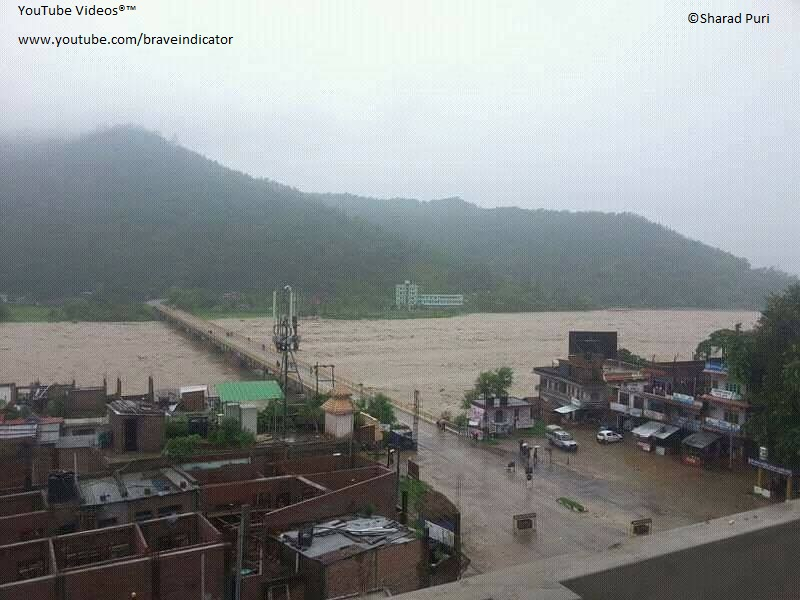
- West Rapti river at Bhalubang

Location
- Country: Nepal, India

Physical characteristics
- Source
  - location: Rapti Zone, Nepal south of border of Rukum District with Rolpa District
  - coordinates: 28°28′33″N 82°52′44″E
  - elevation: 3,500 m (11,500 ft)
- Mouth
  - location: Ghaghara River
  - coordinates: 26°17′20″N 83°40′08″E
  - elevation: 60 m (200 ft)
- Basin size: 23,900 km^{2} (9,200 sq mi)
- Discharge
  - average: 136 m^{3}/s (4,800 cu ft/s)

Basin features
- River system: Ganges
- Tributaries
  - left: Lungri Khola, Jhimruk Khola, Ami River, Rohini River
  - right: Arun Khola,

The West Rapti is a river which drains Rapti Zone in Mid-Western Region, Nepal, then Awadh and Bhojpur-Purvanchal regions of Uttar Pradesh state, India before joining the Ghaghara. It is a major left bank tributary of the Ganges, and is also known as the Karnali in Nepal.

The West Rapti is notable for janajati ethnic groups – Kham Magar among its highland sources and then Tharu in Inner Terai Deukhuri Valley, for its irrigation and hydroelectric potential, and for recurrent floods that led to its nickname "Gorakhpur's Sorrow".

== History ==
=== As ancient Airavati river ===
Aciravati, Achirvati or Airavati is the ancient name for a river has been identified with the modern Rapti, flowing through what is now Nepal and the northern portion of Uttar Pradesh. The Chinese pilgrim Xuanzang knew it as A-chi-lo. Jain texts mention it as Eravai.

The ancient city of Sravasti, once capital of Kosala Kingdom, stood on the western bank of the Achirvati. The river was a tributary of the Sarayu. It was one of the five great rivers that constituted the Ganges group of rivers and one of the sacred rivers of the Buddhist midland.

== Geography ==
The Rapti rises south of a prominent E-W ridgeline midway between the western Dhaulagiri Himalaya and the Mahabharat Range. A 3,500 metres (11,500 ft) summit on this ridgeline marks a triple divide. North of the triple divide the Karnali and Gandaki basins are adjacent; south of it the Rapti and similar but smaller Babai River (Nepali: बबई नदी; Babaī Nadī) separate the two larger basins. After crossing into India, the Babai and Rapti separately join the Karnali's continuation called Ghaghara. The Ghaghara ultimately joins the Ganges.

== Hydrology ==
The Rapti's headwaters descend south from rugged highlands populated by Kham Magar. The western tributary Mādī Kholā (Nepali: माडी खोला) rises in northwestern Rolpa and is joined by Lungrī Kholā (Nepali: लुङग्री खोला) draining northeastern Rolpa. The Mardi then crosses into Pyuthan. It is joined by east-flowing Arun Kholā (Nepali: अरुण खोला) at Devithān (Nepali: देवीथान) where it enters a gorge through the Mahabharat Range.

Jhimruk Kholā (Nepali: झिमरुक खोला) -- east of the Mardi—mainly drains Pyuthan. Below the upper highlands, an alluvial valley opens where Brahman and Chhetri rice farmers irrigate paddy fields. At Cherneta, Pyuthan the Jhimruk approaches within 1.5 km of the Mardi and a 12 megawatt hydroelectric plant exploits the Jhimruk being 200 meters higher.

Below Cherneta the Jhimruk loops east, becoming the border between Pyuthan and Arghakhanchi District. Its valley narrows and steepens as it enters the Mahabharat Range. Partway through it joins the Mardi and the combined flow is then named the Rapti. The main river emerges from its gorge into the lower Siwalik Hills and Dang District. At Bhalubang Bazaar Nepal's east-west Mahendra Highway bridges the river.

Below Bhalubang, Inner Terai Deukhuri Valley opens between the Dang and Dudhwa Ranges, both sub ranges of the Siwaliks. Valley, following the WNW trend of the Siwalik hills for 100 km. Although the land is fertile, before DDT came into use in the 1950s Deukhuri was so malarial that only the Tharu people who had genetic resistance could be confident of surviving the warmer months.

The river crosses from Dang into Banke District. Approaching Nepalganj—largest town in Nepal's western Terai—the Dudhwa Hills fall away and the river turns SE, crossing into Uttar Pradesh, India and flowing through districts Shravasti, Siddharth Nagar, Basti, Sant Kabir Nagar, Maharajganj District and Gorakhpur, passing Gorakhpur city at about 135 air miles (215 km) from Nepal.

Just west of the city it is joined by the smaller Rohini rising further east in Nepal's Nawalparasi and Rupandehi Districts, draining 794 km^{2} in Nepal then 1892 km^{2} following through Maharajganj District in India. 60 km beyond Gorakhpur the Rapti joins the Ghaghara (Karnali) at Rajpur. About 120 km further on at Chhapra, the Ghaghara reaches the Ganges.

== Resource utilisation ==
The Rapti's flow has great seasonal variation because the river lacks sources in high elevation glaciers and snowfields to buffer pre-monsoon drought. Average monthly flows at Jalkundi (27°58'N, 82°14'E) in Deukhuri Valley vary from 17.6 m^{3}/s in pre-monsoon April to 451 m^{3}/s at the peak of the monsoon in August. Maximum recorded flood was 7,390 m^{3}/s on 10 September 1981. 100-year flood flows are predicted at 10,100 m^{3}/s. Every year, floods threaten over 700,000 acres (280,000 ha) in Uttar Pradesh.

Flood control projects under study include a dam at Jalkundi that would inundate 71,000 acres (29,000 ha) of farmland in Deukhuri Valley. An alternative dam site is upstream at Naumure on the Pyuthan-Dang district border (27°53'N, 82°48'E). This would be an earthen dam 169 m high with 351 million cubic meters live storage capacity, storing excess monsoon flows for irrigation use during the following dry season and generating up to 207 megawatts. Impoundment would mainly be in gorges through the Mahabharat Range, inundating less farmland than the Jalkundi alternative. Plans are also underway for three irrigation sub-projects – Kapilvastu District 30,500 hectares (75,000 acres) involving interbasin water transfer to the southeast, Deukhuri Valley 9,500 hectares (23,000 acres), and Banke District 40,000 hectares (99,000 acres).
