= Rapti Highway =

Road in Nepal

Rapti Highway राप्ती राजमार्ग
- राष्ट्रिय राजमार्ग ५५
- National Highway 55
- Rapti Highway in red

Route information
- Maintained by MoPIT (Department of Roads)
- Length: 168.68 km (104.81 mi)

Major junctions
- From: Satbariya-Ameliya, Nepal
- To: Musikot Khalanga, Nepal

Location
- Country: Nepal

Highway system
- Roads in Nepal
| ← NH54 | → NH56 |

Rapti Highway or NH55 (previously: H11) (Nepali: राप्ती राजमार्ग) is a highway in central Nepal that crosses the districts of Dang, Salyan and West Rukum in a south to north direction. The 176 km highway branches off Mahendra Highway in Satbariya towards Tulsipur in the North, where it intersects with Feeder Road 15 just north of Dang Airport, a road that connects the highway to the district headquarter of Dang, Ghorahi. Rapti Highway then follows Sharada River and passes the municipalities of Sharada and Bagchaur. From there, the highway runs towards Musikot Khalanga, the district headquarter of West Rukum District, where it terminates.
