= National Highway 46 (Nepal) =

Highway in Nepal

Bhumahi–Parasi Highway भुमही-परासी राजमार्ग
- राष्ट्रिय राजमार्ग ४६
- National Highway 46
- NH46 in red

Route information
- Maintained by MoPIT (Department of Roads)
- Length: 7 km (4.3 mi)

Major junctions
- North end: Bhumahi
- Sourh end: Parasi

Location
- Country: Nepal
- Provinces: Lumbini Province
- Districts: Nawalparasi West

Highway system
- Roads in Nepal
← NH45	→ NH47

National Highway NH46 (Bhumahi–Parasi) is a national highway in Nepal. The highway is located in Nawalparasi West in Lumbini Province. The total length of the highway is just 7 kilometres (4.3 mi). Parasi-Bhumhi road is one of the many main industrial corridor of Lumbini Province. It is the shortest highway of Nepal.
