= Madan Ashrit Highway =

Road in Nepal

Madan Ashrit Highway मदन आश्रित राजमार्ग
- राष्ट्रिय राजमार्ग ४४
- National Highway 44
- Madan Ashrit Highway in red

Route information
- Maintained by MoPIT (Department of Roads)
- Length: 33.2 km (20.6 mi)

Major junctions
- From: Narayanghat
- NH01 Mahendra Highway at Narayanghat; NH17 Prithvi Highway at Mugling
- To: Mugling

Location
- Country: Nepal

Highway system
- Roads in Nepal
← NH43	→ NH45

Madan Ashrit Highway or (NH44) (previously: H05) (Nepali: मदन आश्रित राजमार्ग) is one of Nepal's busiest international roadway links, carrying 90% of all international traffic, or about 20,000 vehicles daily. The 36 km road connects Naryangadh and Mugling. A 33.2 km section was widened from 5 meters to 9–11 meters, and was finished in June 2018. It connects to Prithvi Highway at Mugling and Mahendra Highway at Naryanghat.
