= National Highway 50 (Nepal) =

Highway in Nepal

Maryadpur–Taulihawa–Jitpur Highway मर्यादपुर-तौलिहवा-जीतपुर राजमार्ग
- राष्ट्रिय राजमार्ग ५०
- National Highway 50
- NH50 in red

Route information
- Maintained by MoPIT (Department of Roads)
- Length: 33.05 km (20.54 mi)

Major junctions
- North end: Jitpur
- Taulihawa
- Sourh end: Maryadpur

Location
- Country: Nepal
- Provinces: Lumbini Province
- Districts: Kapilvastu District

Highway system
- Roads in Nepal
← NH49	→ NH51

National Highway 50, NH50 (Maryadpur–Taulihawa–Jitpur) is a national highway in Nepal. The highway is located in Kapilvastu District in Lumbini Province. The total length of the highway is 33.05 kilometres (20.54 mi). It was a Feeder Road F010 which upgrade to NH50.

The road starts at Maryadpur (Indo-Nepal) border connects the district headquarters at Taulihawa and runs north-east to connect with Mahendra Highway (NH01) at Jitpur.
