= Chisapani, Banke =

Chisapani चिसापानी
- City
- Location in Lumbini Province Chisapani (Nepal)
- Coordinates: 28°38′N 81°17′E
- Country: Nepal
- Province: Lumbini Province
- District: Bardiya District
- Elevation: 200 m (660 ft)

Population (1991)
  - Total: 2,862
  - Religions: Hindu
- Time zone: UTC+5:45 (Nepal Time)

Chisapani is a village in Bardiya district in Lumbini Province of south-western Nepal, not to be confused with Chisapani in the bank of Karnali River.

At the time of the 1991 Nepal census it had a population of 2,862 and had 526 houses in the village.

The academic section of Nepalgunj Medical College is located in Chisapani.

== Government ==
The purpose of Village Development Committees is to organise village people structurally at a local level and creating a partnership between the community and the public sector for improved service delivery system. A VDC has a status as an autonomous institution and authority for interacting with the more centralised institutions of governance in Nepal. In doing so, the VDC gives village people an element of control and responsibility in development, and also ensures proper utilization and distribution of state funds and a greater interaction between government officials, NGOs and agencies. The village development committees within a given area will discuss education, water supply, basic health, sanitation and income and will also monitor and record progress which is displayed in census data.

In VDCs there is one elected chief, usually elected with over an 80% majority. From each ward, there is also a chief that is elected along with these there are also four members elected or nominated.

== Climate ==
Climate data for Chisapani (1976–2005)
Month	Jan	Feb	Mar	Apr	May	Jun	Jul	Aug	Sep	Oct	Nov	Dec	Year
Mean daily maximum °C (°F)	20.0 (68.0)	23.8 (74.8)	29.3 (84.7)	35.0 (95.0)	36.1 (97.0)	34.7 (94.5)	31.7 (89.1)	31.4 (88.5)	31.1 (88.0)	30.2 (86.4)	26.1 (79.0)	21.3 (70.3)	29.2 (84.6)
Mean daily minimum °C (°F)	10.6 (51.1)	12.5 (54.5)	16.4 (61.5)	21.1 (70.0)	24.3 (75.7)	25.6 (78.1)	25.1 (77.2)	24.9 (76.8)	24.0 (75.2)	20.4 (68.7)	16.0 (60.8)	12.1 (53.8)	19.4 (67.0)
Source: Agricultural Extension in South Asia
