= National Highway 80 (Nepal) =

Highway in Nepal

Bastipur–Belsot Highway बस्तीपुर-बेल्सोट राजमार्ग
- राष्ट्रिय राजमार्ग ८०
- National Highway 80
- NH80 in red

Route information
- Maintained by MoPIT (Department of Roads)
- Length: 16.40 km (10.19 mi)
- History: Under construction

Major junctions
- North end: Belsot
- South end: Bastipur Chowk

Location
- Country: Nepal
- Provinces: Koshi Province, Madhesh Province
- Districts: Siraha, Udayapur

Highway system
- Roads in Nepal
← NH79	→ NH01

NH80 (Bastipur–Belsot Road) is a planned National Highway of Nepal which will be constructed Between Madhesh and Koshi provinces of Nepal. The total length of the highway is planned to be 16.40 kilometres (10.19 mi).

The road is planned to start from Bastipur Chowk of Siraha District (from NH-1) and planned to finish at Belsot of Katari Municipality (Udayapur District). The road will pass through Churia Hills on Madhesh-Koshi border via Cancer Hospital.
