= National Highway 29 (Nepal) =

Highway in Nepal

Kanchanban-Chhireswornath Highway कञ्चनवन-क्षीरेश्वरनाथ राजमार्ग
- राष्ट्रिय राजमार्ग २९
- National Highway 29
- NH29 in red

Route information
- Maintained by MoPIT (Department of Roads)
- Length: 30 km (19 mi)

Major junctions
- East end: Portaha Bazar
- West end: Janaki medical college (Chhireswornath)

Location
- Country: Nepal
- Provinces: Madhesh Province
- Districts: Dhanusha District

Highway system
- Roads in Nepal
← NH28	→ NH30

National Highway 29 (NH29) is a proposed National Highway of Nepal, located in Dhanusha District of Madhesh Province. The total length of the highway is 30 kilometres (19 mi).
