= Sworna Sagarmatha Brihat Chakrapath =

Highway in Nepal

Sworna Sagarmatha Brihat Chakrapath स्वर्ण सगरमाथा बृहत चक्रपथ
- राष्ट्रिय राजमार्ग ७५
- National Highway 75
- NH75 in red

Route information
- Maintained by MoPIT (Department of Roads)
- Length: 135 km (84 mi)
- History: Under construction

Major junctions
- East end: ringroad
- ringroad
- West end: ringroad

Location
- Country: Nepal
- Provinces: Koshi Province
- District: Khotang, Okhaldhunga, Solukhumbu

Highway system
- Roads in Nepal
← NH74	→ NH76

NH75 (Sworna Sagarmatha Brihat Chakrapath) (Nepali: स्वर्ण सगरमाथा बृहत चक्रपथ; English translation: Golden Everest Larger Ringroad) is a provincial National Highway under construction in Koshi Province of Nepal. The total length of the ringroad highway is 135 kilometres (84 mi).

The ringroad highway is planned to be constructed into three districts of Koshi Province, i.e. Khotang District, Okhaldhunga District and Solukhumbu District. The construction of the road has been started from the headquarters of Okhaldhunga, then it will run towards Salleri, the headquarters of Solukhumbu District and then towards Diktel, the headquarters of Khotang District and again the road will be joined to Okhaldhunga. Currently the 38 kilometres (24 mi) road from Biplate of Okhaldhunga to Pancham of Solukhumbu is being constructed.
