= National Highway 74 (Nepal) =

Highway in Nepal

Ilam-Sandakpur Highway इलाम-सन्दकपुर राजमार्ग
- राष्ट्रिय राजमार्ग ७४
- National Highway 74
- NH74 in red

Route information
- Maintained by MoPIT (Department of Roads)
- Length: 35 km (22 mi)
- History: Under construction

Major junctions
- East end: Sandakpur
- West end: Biplate

Location
- Country: Nepal
- Provinces: Koshi Province
- District: Ilam

Highway system
- Roads in Nepal
← NH73	→ NH75

NH74 is a provincial National Highway under construction in Koshi Province of Nepal. The total length of the highway is 35 kilometres (22 mi).

The NH74 highway starts at Biblate Bazar in Ilam Municipality and runs North-east into Sandakpur Rural Municipality. It passes through Deurali and Gurunggau in Sandakpur Rural Municipality and reach on Indo-Nepal border at Sandakphu mountain (3,636 metres (11,929 ft)) where it terminates finally.

The 35 kilometres (22 mi) track has been opened in which the 5 kilometres (3.1 mi) from Biblate Bazar has been black topped, the next 5 kilometres (3.1 mi) has been Gravelled and remaining 25 kilometres (16 mi) road is Dirt road.
