= Kalu Pandey Highway =

Highway in Nepal

Kalu Pandey Highway कालु पाण्डे राजमार्ग
- राष्ट्रिय राजमार्ग ४३
- National Highway 43
- NH43 in red

Route information
- Maintained by MoPIT (Department of Roads)
- Length: 57 km (35 mi)

Location
- Country: Nepal
- Provinces: Bagmati Province
- Districts: Dhading

Highway system
- Roads in Nepal
← NH42	→ NH44

Kalu Pandey Highway (National Highway 43, NH43) is a national highway in Nepal. The highway is located in Dhading District of Bagmati Province. The total length of the highway is 57 kilometres (35 mi). This highway is an important highway connecting Sankhu, Dhubakot, Khalte and other places of North Dhading.
