= Bharatpur Ring Road =

Highway in Nepal

Bharatpur Ring Road भरतपुर चक्रपथ
- राष्ट्रिय राजमार्ग ७७
- National Highway 77
- NH77 in red

Route information
- Maintained by MoPIT (Department of Roads)
- Length: 60.90 km (37.84 mi)

Major junctions
- Narayanghat, Baseni, Gondrang Chok, Dhanauji Chok, Jagatpur, Tri Chok, Chaubiskothi

Location
- Country: Nepal
- Provinces: Bagmati Province
- Districts: Bharatpur District

Highway system
- Roads in Nepal
← NH76	→ NH78

Bharatpur Ring Road (National Highway 77, NH77) is a proposed ring road marked, as a national highway in Nepal. This ring road is located in Bharatpur metropolis in Chitwan District of Bagmati Province. The total length of this road/highway is 60 kilometres (37 mi) out of which 29.18 kilometres (18.13 mi) of the road has been opened and construction is underway.
