= Shahid Highway =

Highway in Nepal

Sahid Highway सहिद राजमार्ग
- राष्ट्रिय राजमार्ग ५४
- National Highway 54
- NH54 in red

Route information
- Maintained by MoPIT (Department of Roads)
- Length: 223.91 km (139.13 mi)

Major junctions
- North end: Lukum
- Gadhwa, Lamahi, Arjunkholagau, Ghorahi, Darbot
- Sourh end: Koilabas

Location
- Country: Nepal
- Provinces: Lumbini Province
- Districts: Dang District, Rolpa District, East Rukum

Highway system
- Roads in Nepal
← NH53	→ NH55

Sahid Highway (National Highway 54) is a national highway in Nepal located in Lumbini Province. The total length of the highway is 223.91 kilometres (139.13 mi). Feeder road F138, F015 and F179 were converted and upgraded into NH54.

- The Koilabas – Lamahi (from Indo-Nepal border to Mahendra Highway at Lamahi) section of this Highway is 33.5 km (20.82 mi) in length which has been built with the cooperation of India. The Government of India has funded NR 698 million for construction of 33.5 km road from Lamahi to Koilabas, connecting East–west highway and India-Nepal border.
- The Lamahi – Ghorahi (28 km (17.40 mi)) section of this highway is under widening.
- The Ghorahi – Lukum section of this highway is under construction.
