= National Highway 79 (Nepal) =

Highway in Nepal

Godar-Chisapani-Dudhauli Highway गोदार-चिसापानी-दुधौली राजमार्ग
- राष्ट्रिय राजमार्ग ७९
- National Highway 79
- NH79 in red

Route information
- Maintained by MoPIT (Department of Roads)
- Length: 20 km (12 mi)

Major junctions
- North end: Dudhauli
- South end: Godar

Location
- Country: Nepal
- Provinces: Madhesh Province, Bagmati Province
- Districts: Dhanusha District, Sindhuli District

Highway system
- Roads in Nepal
← NH78	→ NH80

National Highway 79 (NH79) is a proposed national highway in Nepal located between Madhesh Province and Bagmati Province. The total length of the highway is 20 kilometres (12 mi)

According to Sindhuli Saugat (a local news media of Sindhuli) the track was opened in 2073 BS (2016 AD)

The highway links Mahendra Highway (NH01) at Godar and Madan Bhandari Highway (NH09) at Ratmate.
