= National Highway 26 (Nepal) =

Highway in Nepal

Jamunibas-Janakpur Highway जमुनीबास-जनकपुर राजमार्ग
- राष्ट्रिय राजमार्ग २६
- National Highway 26
- NH26 in red

Route information
- Maintained by MoPIT (Department of Roads)
- Length: 20.8 km (12.9 mi)

Major junctions
- North end: Jamunibas
- South end: Janakpur

Location
- Country: Nepal
- Provinces: Madhesh Province
- Districts: Dhanusha District

Highway system
- Roads in Nepal
← NH25	→ NH27

National Highway 26 (Jamunibas–Janakpur) is a national highway of Nepal, located in Dhanusha District of Madhesh Province. The total length of the highway is 20.8 kilometres (12.9 mi).

According to the Statistics of National Highway (SNH-2020-21) 3.33 kilometres (2.07 mi) road is completed with asphalt and 16.75 kilometres (10.41 mi) road is still under construction.
