= National Highway 32 (Nepal) =

Highway in Nepal

Nawalpur-Malangwa Highway नवलपुर-मलंगवा राजमार्ग
- राष्ट्रिय राजमार्ग ३२
- National Highway 32
- NH32 in red

Route information
- Maintained by MoPIT (Department of Roads)
- Length: 29.19 km (18.14 mi)

Major junctions
- North end: Nawalpur
- Malangwa
- South end: Sonbarsha

Location
- Country: Nepal
- Provinces: Madhesh Province
- Districts: Sarlahi District

Highway system
- Roads in Nepal
← NH31	→ NH33

National Highway 32 (Nawalpur-Sonbarsa) is a National Highway of Nepal, located in Sarlahi District of Madhesh Province. The total length of the highway is 29.19 kilometres (18.14 mi).
