= National Highway 30 (Nepal) =

Highway in Nepal

Dharapani-Janakpur Highway धारापानी-जनकपुर राजमार्ग
- राष्ट्रिय राजमार्ग ३०
- National Highway 30
- NH30 in red

Route information
- Maintained by MoPIT (Department of Roads)
- Length: 25.96 km (16.13 mi)

Major junctions
- North end: Dharapani
- Mithileshwar Mauwahi
- South end: Janaki Mandir, Janakpur

Location
- Country: Nepal
- Provinces: Madhesh Province
- Districts: Dhanusha District

Highway system
- Roads in Nepal
← NH29	→ NH31

National Highway 30 (NH30) is a National Highway of Nepal, located in Dhanusha District of Madhesh Province. The total length of the highway is 25.96 kilometres (16.13 mi).
