= Falgunanda Highway =

Highway in Nepal

Falgunanda Highway फाल्गुनन्द राजमार्ग
- राष्ट्रिय राजमार्ग ७६
- National Highway 76
- NH76 in red

Route information
- Maintained by MoPIT (Department of Roads)
- Length: 41 km (25 mi)
- History: Under construction

Major junctions
- North end: Rabi
- South end: Damak

Location
- Country: Nepal
- Provinces: Koshi Province
- Districts: Jhapa, Ilam

Highway system
- Roads in Nepal
← NH75	→ NH77

Falgunanda Highway (NH76) (Nepali: फाल्गुनन्द राजमार्ग) is a provincial national highway under construction in Koshi Province, Nepal. The highway has a total length of 41 kilometres (25 mi).

The dirt track opening of Falgunanda Highway, which began two decades ago, was completed in January 2018. The first section of NH76, from Damak to the refugee camp (6.5 kilometres (4.0 mi)), was signed for upgrading to a blacktopped road on 14 August 2018. Additional sections were contracted for similar upgrades in February 2020. According to the Department of Roads, 6.5 kilometres (4.0 mi) from Damak to the refugee camp has been blacktopped, while 14.32 kilometres (8.90 mi) from the refugee camp to Baghmara is currently undergoing blacktopping. The remaining 21.47 kilometres (13.34 mi) from Baghmara to Chisapani and 8 kilometres (5.0 mi) from Chisapani to Rabi remain as dirt roads.
