= National Highway 24 (Nepal) =

Highway in Nepal

Lalgadh-Ranibas-Bhiman Highway लालगढ-रानीवास-भिमान राजमार्ग
- राष्ट्रिय राजमार्ग २४
- National Highway 24
- NH24 in red

Route information
- Maintained by MoPIT (Department of Roads)
- Length: 29 km (18 mi)

Major junctions
- North end: Bhiman
- South end: Lalgadh

Location
- Country: Nepal
- Provinces: Madhesh Province, Bagmati Province
- Districts: Dhanusha District, Sindhuli District

Highway system
- Roads in Nepal
← NH23	→ NH25

National Highway 24 (Lalgadh-Ranibas-Bhiman) is a 29-kilometre (18 mi) planned national highway of Nepal, which will be constructed between Madhesh Province (Dhanusha District) and Bagmati Province (Sindhuli District).

NH24
Number	District	Section	Length (km)	Length (mi)	Status
1	Dhanusha	Lalgadh–Tulsi Chauda	13.42	8.34	Planned
2	Sindhuli	Tulsi ChaudaºBhiman	15.58	9.68	Planned
