= Satbariya =

Satbariya सतबरिया
- Village Development Committee
- Location in Nepal
- Coordinates: 27.93°N 82.33°E
- Country: Nepal
- Province: Lumbini Province
- District: Dang Deokhuri District

Population (1991)
  - Total: 8,829
- Time zone: UTC+5:45 (Nepal Time)

Satbariya is a town and Village Development Committee in Dang Deokhuri District in Lumbini Province of south-western Nepal. At the time of the 1991 Nepal census it had a population of 8,829 persons living in 1258 individual households.
