= Damak Ring Road =

Highway in Nepal

Damak Ring Road दमक चक्रपथ
- राष्ट्रिय राजमार्ग ७८
- National Highway 78
- Damak Ring Road in red

Route information
- Maintained by MoPIT (Department of Roads)
- Length: 100 km (62 mi)
- History: Under construction

Major junctions
- North end: Refugee camp
- Urlabari, Pashuhat
- South end: Ratuwa Khola

Location
- Country: Nepal
- Provinces: Koshi Province
- District: Jhapa

Highway system
- Roads in Nepal
← NH77	→ NH79

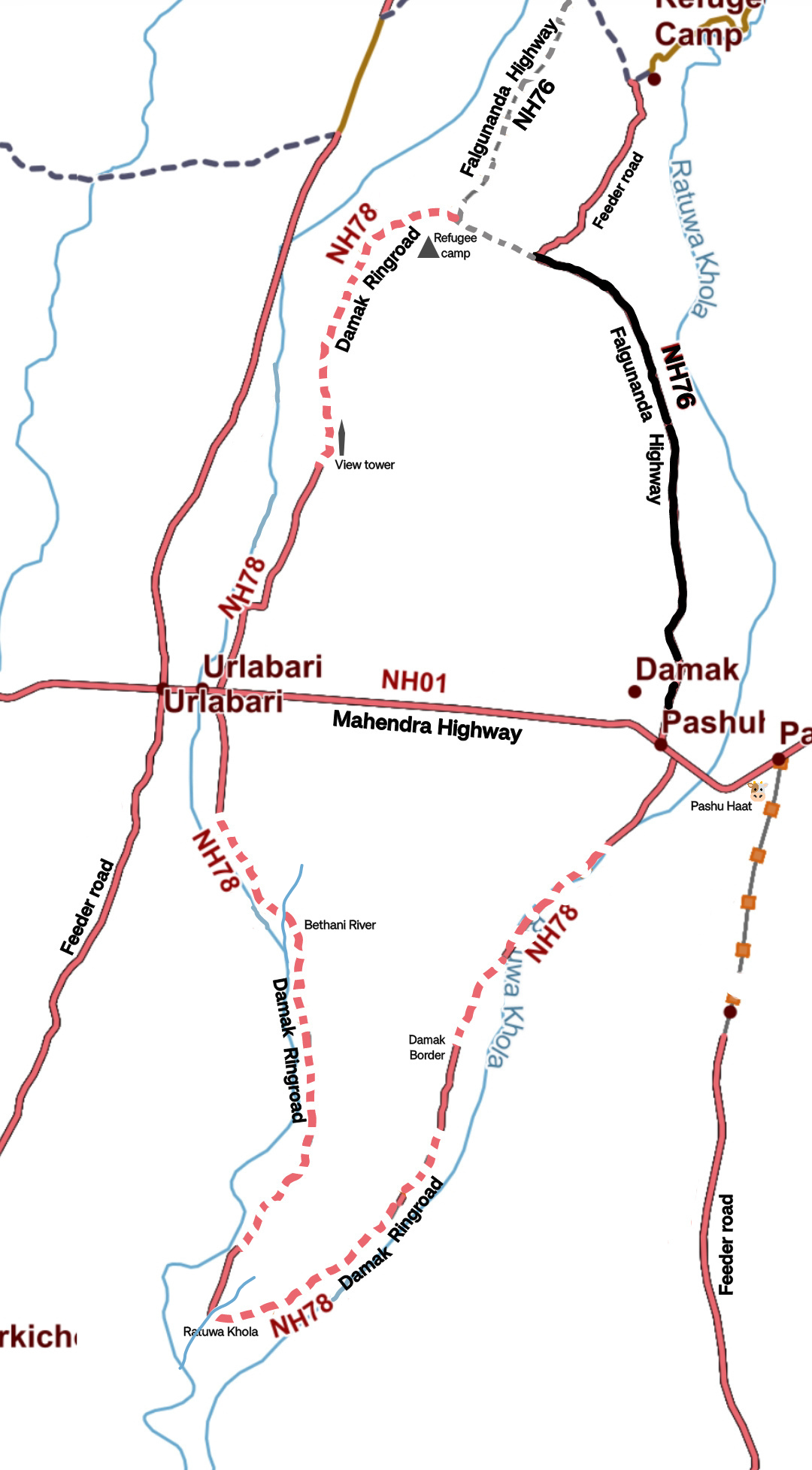
Damak Ring Road

Damak Ring Road (NH78) is a Ring Road categorised as a National Highway under construction in Koshi Province of Nepal. The total length of the highway is 100 kilometres (62 mi).

Located in Damak Municipality of Jhapa District, the Damak ringroad project was initiated around two decades ago.

The ringroad is divided into 6 sections:

#	Sections	Length	Status
1	Refugee camp - View tower	15.90	Under construction
2	View tower - Urlabari	12.68	Under construction
3	Urlabari - Betani River	12.36	Under construction
4	Betani River - Ratua Khola	21.85	Under construction
5	Ratua Khola - Damak Border	17.49	Under construction
6	Damak Border - Pashuhat	19.72	Under construction
	Damak Ring road	100 kilometres (62 mi)	Under construction
