= National Highway 45 (Nepal) =

Highway in Nepal

Khairenitar–Bhimad–Kawasoti Highway खैरेनीटार-भिमाद-कावासोती राजमार्ग
- राष्ट्रिय राजमार्ग ४५
- National Highway 45
- NH45 in red

Route information
- Maintained by MoPIT (Department of Roads)
- Length: 106 km (66 mi)

Major junctions
- North end: Khairenitar
- Sourh end: Kawasoti

Location
- Country: Nepal
- Provinces: Gandaki Province
- Districts: Nawalparasi East, Tanahun

Highway system
- Roads in Nepal
← NH44	→ NH46

National Highway NH45 (Khairenitar-Bhimad-Kawasoti ) is a national highway in Nepal. The highway is located in Nawalparasi East and Tanahun of Gandaki Province. The total length of the highway is 106 kilometres (66 mi).

According to the office, the road, which is currently one lane, will become two lanes after upgrading. The local residents are happy after the budget has been released for road upgrading and the work has started.
