= Birendra Highway =

Highway in Nepal

Birendra Highway वीरेन्द्र राजमार्ग
- राष्ट्रिय राजमार्ग ३६
- National Highway 36
- NH36 in red
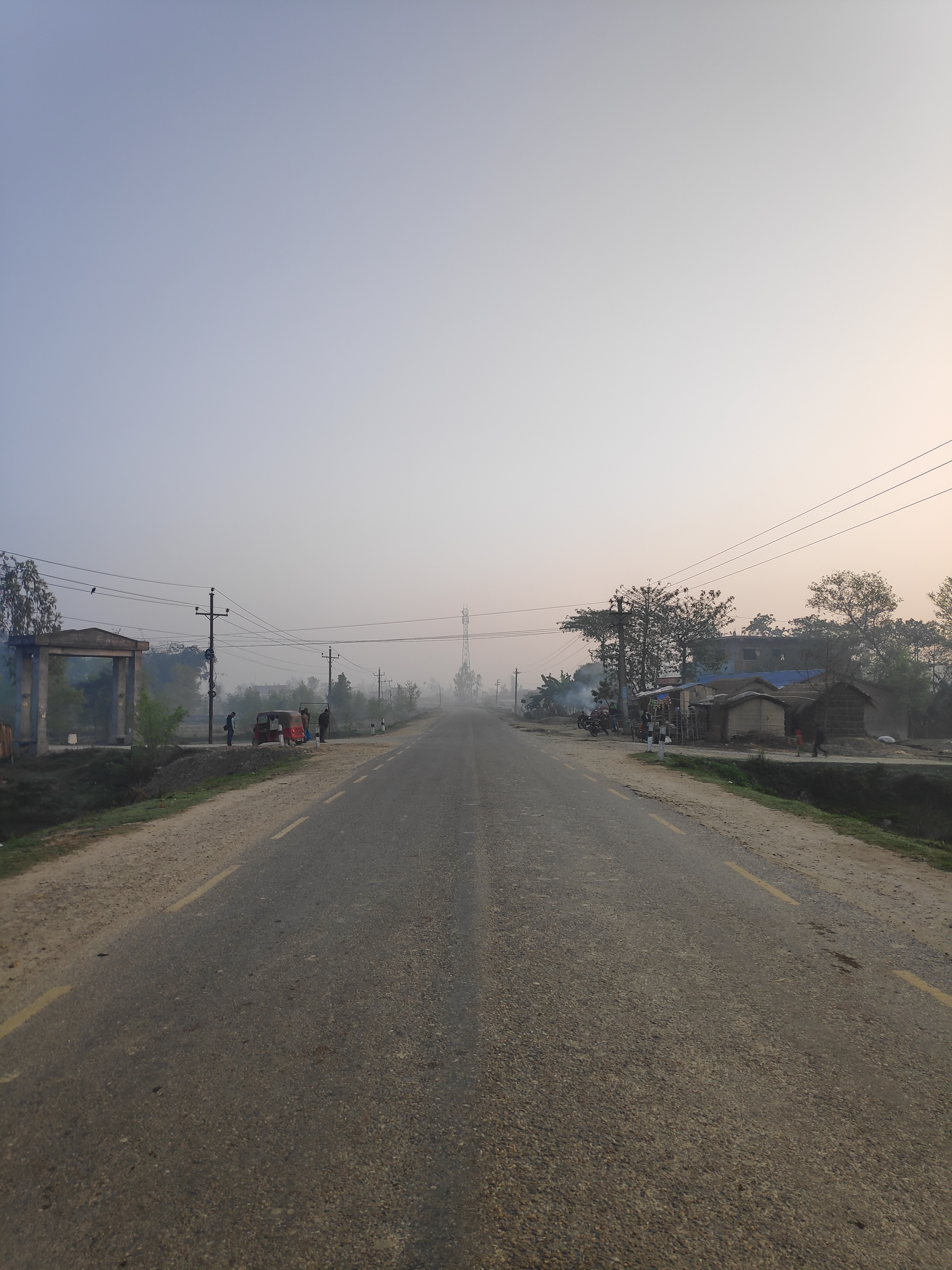
- Birendra Highway at Saruatha in 2020

Route information
- Maintained by MoPIT (Department of Roads)
- Length: 45.44 km (28.24 mi)

Major junctions
- North end: Chandranigahapur
- Saruatha
- South end: Bairaganiya

Location
- Country: Nepal
- Provinces: Madhesh Province
- Districts: Rautahat District

Highway system
- Roads in Nepal
← NH35	→ NH37

Birendra Highway (National Highway 36, NH36, or Chandranigahpur–Bairaganiya) (Nepali: वीरेन्द्र राजमार्ग) is a national highway of Nepal, located in Rautahat District of Madhesh Province. The total length of the highway is 45.44 kilometres (28.24 mi).
