= National Highway 35 (Nepal) =

Highway in Nepal

Matiarwa-Manmat Highway मटिअर्वा-मन्मत राजमार्ग
- राष्ट्रिय राजमार्ग ३५
- National Highway 35
- NH35 in red

Route information
- Maintained by MoPIT (Department of Roads)
- Length: 25 km (16 mi)

Major junctions
- North end: Manmat
- Kalaiya
- South end: Matiarwa

Location
- Country: Nepal
- Provinces: Madhesh Province
- Districts: Bara District

Highway system
- Roads in Nepal
← NH34	→ NH36

National Highway 35 (Matiarwa-Manmat) is a National Highway of Nepal, located in Bara District of Madhesh Province. The total length of the highway is 25 kilometres (16 mi).
