= National Highway 51 (Nepal) =

Highway in Nepal

Taulihawa–Gorusinge–Sandhikharka Highway तौलिहवा-गोरुसिंगे-सन्धिखर्क राजमार्ग
- राष्ट्रिय राजमार्ग ५१
- National Highway 51
- NH51 in red

Route information
- Maintained by MoPIT (Department of Roads)
- Length: 83.13 km (51.65 mi)
- History: F011

Major junctions
- North end: Sandhikharka
- Gorusinge
- Sourh end: Taulihawa

Location
- Country: Nepal
- Provinces: Lumbini Province
- Districts: Kapilvastu District, Arghakhanchi District

Highway system
- Roads in Nepal
| ← NH50 | → NH52 |

National Highway 51, NH51 is a national highway in Nepal. The highway is located in Kapilvastu District and Arghakhanchi District in Lumbini Province. The total length of the highway is 83.13 kilometres (51.65 mi). The 25.01 kilometres (15.54 mi) of road length is covered by Kapilvastu district and the remaining 58.12 kilometres (36.11 mi) of road is covered by Arghakhanchi District. It was a Feeder Road F011 which upgrade to NH51.

NH51 is a gateway to enter Arghakhanchi Headquarters. From Patharkot on the border of Kapilvastu and Arghakhanchi, one can reach the headquarters Sandhikhark by a 57 km hilly journey. The 11 km road from Gorusinge to Patharkot is double lane.
