= Dumkibas =

- Village development committee
- Location in Nepal Dumkibas (Nepal)
- Coordinates: 27.59°N 83.88°E
- Country: Nepal
- Zone: Lumbini Zone
- District: Nawalparasi District

Population (1991)
  - Total: 6,948
- Time zone: UTC+5:45 (Nepal Time)

Dumkibas is a village development committee in Nawalparasi District in the Lumbini Zone of southern Nepal.

The longest highway of Nepal, Mahendra Highway, bisects this village. It lies between two rivers the Binai and the Jyameree. It is located at the foothills of the Mahabharat range, so the climate is cooler than elsewhere in the Terai. After the ten-year-long Maoist civil war, there is now progress. Many youth study and work abroad. Most of people of here are engaged in trade and services, but few in agriculture. This town is better-developed than many of its neighbours. A black-topped road and a full literacy rate are recent achievements. The country's biggest cement factory provides many jobs to the locals and is run by Chaudhary Group (CG). Daunne hill is the touristic place of this town. Also, different TV channel and radio channel broadcasting station is located at Daunne hill including (Nepal Television). Banks, a hospital, a school, colleges and wireless Internet service provider are present. In terms of security (there are strict traffic rules) this town is one of the safest in the area as the police station building is re-constructed which was destroyed by Maoists in the civil war. Hence, Dumkibas is a model-town for the districts.
