= National Highway 52 (Nepal) =

Highway in Nepal

Lumbini Highway लुम्बिनी राजमार्ग
- राष्ट्रिय राजमार्ग ५२
- National Highway 52
- NH52 in red

Route information
- Maintained by MoPIT (Department of Roads)
- Length: 215.54 km (133.93 mi)
- History: Feeder roads; F044, F036, F135, F194

Major junctions
- North end: Dhorpatan
- Sandhikharka
- Sourh end: Kalidaha

Location
- Country: Nepal
- Provinces: Lumbini Province, Gandaki Province
- Districts: Rupandehi District, Palpa District, Arghakhanchi District, Gulmi District and Baglung District

Highway system
- Roads in Nepal
← NH51	→ NH53

National Highway 52, NH52 is a national highway in Nepal located between Lumbini and Gandaki provinces of Nepal. The total length of the highway is 215.54 kilometres (133.93 mi). This new route has been given the form of a highway by connecting several feeder roads.

NH52 starts at Kakrahawa–Kalidaha border, 10 kilometres (6.2 mi) away from Lumbini, has recently been converted as the Kakrahwa-Rudrapur-Saljhandi-Sandhikhark-Dhorpatan road (North South trade route). It will directly connect Lumbini and Dhorpatan along with the north–south trade route.

National Highway 52
#	District	Feeder Roads	Length	start/end
1	Rupandehi	F044	12.73 km (7.91 mi)	Kakrahwa–Lumbini
2	Rupandehi	F036	3 km (1.86 mi)	Lumbini-Lumbini square
3	Rupandehi	F135	22.80 km (14.17 mi)	Lumbini Square – Rampur
4	Rupandehi	F194	8.50 km (5.28 mi)	Saljhandi – Satyavati
5	Palpa	F194	15 km (9.32 mi)	Satyavati – Badhare R
6	Arghakhanchi	F194	68 km (42.25 mi)	Badhare R – Sautamre
7	Gulmi	F194	35 km (21.75 mi)	Sautamare – Darling
8	Baglung	F194	52 km (32.31 mi)	Darling – Dhorpatan
