= Bhalubang =

Place in Dang Deukhuri District, Nepal

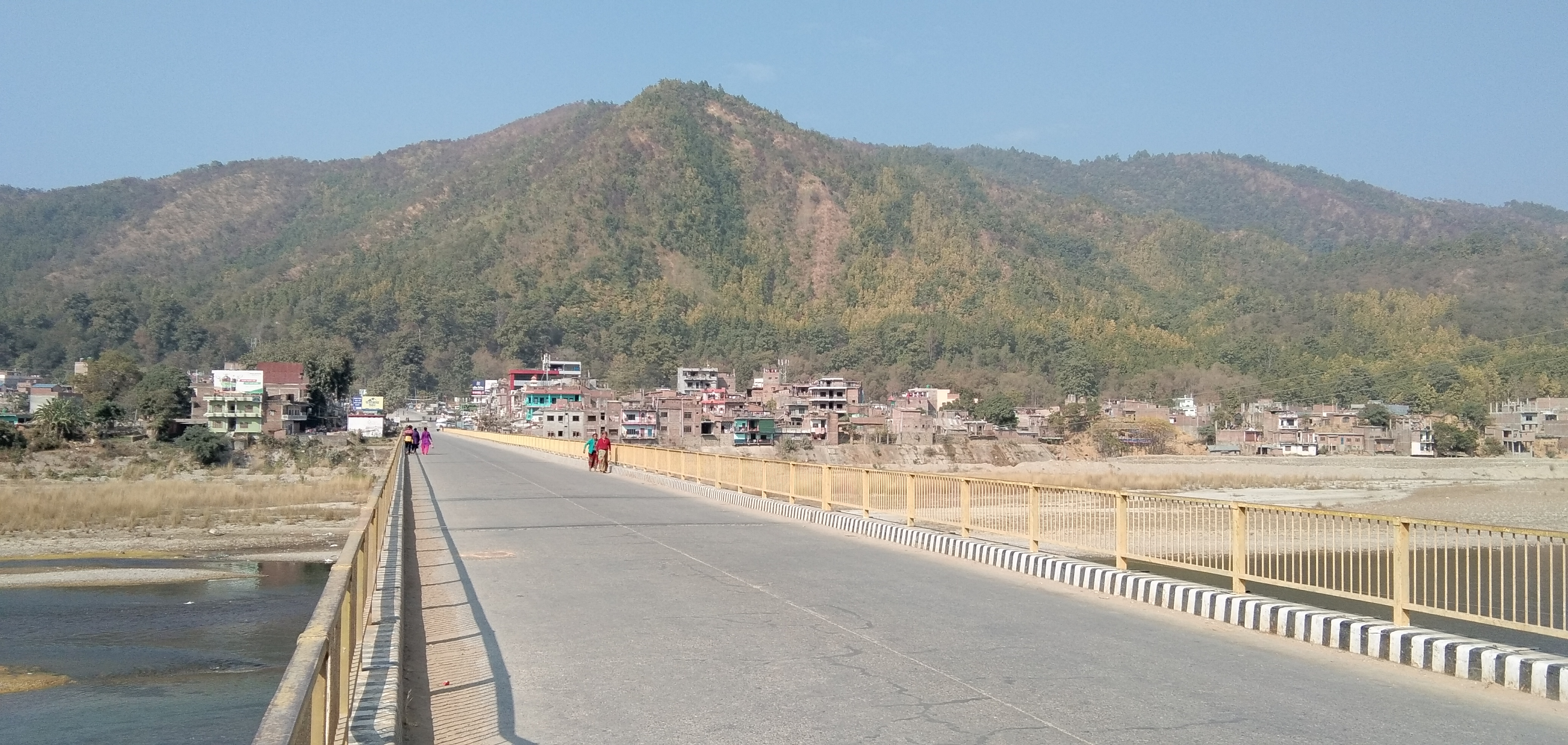
The bridge at Pulchowk Bhalubang.

Bhalubang (Nepali:भालुबाङ), sometimes Bhaluwang (Nepali:भालुवाङ) is a place located in Rapti Rural Municipality, ward number 1 Dang Deukhuri District, Nepal. It is declared as the capital of Lumbini Province from general assembly of province number 5. Bhalubang refers to bear ground. In the Magar Kham language, “Bhalu” means bear and “Bang” means playground. Before human settlement, that place was a playground and habitat for bears. Human settlement in the Bhalubang started mainly in two different stages: one was before the construction of the west Rapti bridge and, another was after the construction of west Rapti river bridge. Bhalubang, the land of ethnic diversity, lies on the lap of Chure hills along with the West Rapti River. It is the local marketplace; people from nearby villages come to shop.

Before the construction of a bridge on the Rapti River, the human settlement was there on the east part of Pulchowk; known as upper Bhalubang. Human settlement in the next phase was started after the construction of the Rapti Setu bridge; people from different parts of Nepal came and captured the land of the national forest near around newly constructed bridge, now known as Pulchowk or Lower Bhalubang. Before the construction of the Rapti bridge, People returning from India used to travel through Banghushree; a village located at Gadhawa rural municipality ward number 1.

Jwalamai gan is an armed police camp and a regional police training center. This camp is located on the west side of Bhalubang where Maoist attack in 2002 AD (2058 BS) caused a huge loss of life and property.

Nepali language is the common language spoken in Bhalubhang.

== Population ==
According to the census of Nepal in B.S 2078, the population of Bhalubhang is 52,123 (?).
