= Bhumahi =

Bhumahi भुमही
- Village
- Location in Nepal
- Coordinates: 27°34′N 83°43′E
- Country: Nepal
- Development Region: Western
- Zone: Lumbini Zone
- District: Nawalparasi District

Population (1991)
  - Total: 14,166
- Time zone: UTC+5:45 (Nepal Time)
- Area code: +078

Bhumahi is a small town of Ramnagar Village Development Committee in Nawalparasi District in the Lumbini Zone of southern Nepal. Mahendra highway (East West highway) goes through the middle; connects Butwal in west, Prasai and Bhairahawa in South and Narayanghat in East. It is one of the fastest growing town in the area.
