= Postal Highway =

Highway in Nepal

Postal Highway हुलाकी राजमार्ग
- राष्ट्रिय राजमार्ग ०५
- National Highway 05
- Postal Highway (NH05) in red

Route information
- Maintained by MoPIT (Department of Roads)
- Length: 1,792.42 km (1,113.76 mi)
- Existed: 1930s–present
- History: constructing

Major junctions
- East end: Bhadrapur
- Biratnagar, Rajbiraj, Siraha, Janakpur, Malangwa, Gaur, Birgunj, Parasi, Bhairahawa, Taulihawa, Nepalganj, Gulariya, Dhangadhi
- West end: Dodhara

Location
- Country: Nepal

Highway system
- Roads in Nepal
← NH04	→ NH06

Postal Highway (NH05) (previously: H17) (Nepali: हुलाकी राजमार्ग) runs across the Terai region of Nepal, from Bhadrapur, Jhapa in the east to Dodhara, Kanchanpur in the west, cutting across the entire width of the country. It is the oldest highway in Nepal constructed by Juddha Shumsher Jung Bahadur Rana and Padma Shumsher Jung Bahadur Rana to aid transportation and facilitate postal services throughout the nation.

The highway is a two-lane road and four-lane at some specific place which connects 20 districts of the Terai frontier and 83% of the road construction had been completed by November 2020. Hulaki rajmarga nirdeshanalaya, department of roads is a government office related to any things on this project.
