= Roads in Nepal =

Nepal National Highways map 2020–21

The road network in Nepal forms the core of the country’s transport infrastructure, linking the Himalayan, mid‑hill and Terai regions. Modern road development began in the 1950s with the construction of the Tribhuvan Highway, the first motorable route connecting Kathmandu with the Indian border at Raxaul.

As of the Economic Survey 2022–23, Nepal has an estimated 34,100 km of national road network, including highways and other strategic routes. The Department of Roads’ Statistics of National Highways (2020/21) lists 80 national highways with a combined length of 11,178.92 km.

Roads in Nepal are administered at three levels of government: national highways by the Department of Roads, provincial highways by provincial ministries, and urban and rural roads by local governments.

== History ==
Before the mid‑20th century, Nepal lacked motorable roads, and long‑distance travel relied mainly on foot trails, mule tracks and river routes across the Himalayan and hill regions. Limited ropeways and porter-based transport supported trade between Kathmandu Valley and the Terai.

Modern road development began after 1950, when Nepal opened up to international assistance and prioritised national connectivity. The first major motorable route, the Tribhuvan Highway, was constructed with Indian support and completed in 1956, linking Kathmandu with the Indian border at Raxaul.

During the 1960s and 1970s, the government expanded the strategic road network through foreign aid partnerships, most notably with India, China and the Soviet Union. This period saw the construction of the East–West Highway (Mahendra Highway), which became the backbone of national mobility across the Terai.

From the 1990s onward, Nepal focused on building north–south corridors to connect remote mountain districts with the national highway system. Major projects included the Mid‑Hill (Pushpalal) Highway and the proposed East–West Himalayan Highway, aimed at improving access in high-altitude regions.

Since the 2015 federal restructuring, road development responsibilities have been shared among federal, provincial and local governments, leading to rapid expansion of rural and agricultural roads, though often with challenges related to engineering standards, maintenance and environmental impacts.

== Nepal Road Standards ==
The first Nepal Road Standard was introduced by the Department of Roads in 1970, classifying roads into four categories: National Highway, Feeder Road, District/Panchayat Road and City Road/Street.

The second Nepal Road Standard, published in 2013, retained the same four categories, with updated design and geometric criteria.

Road classification in Nepal Road Standards
| Nepal Road Standard (1970) | Nepal Road Standard (2013) |
|---|---|
| National Highway | National Highway |
| Feeder Road | Feeder Road |
| District/Panchayat Road | District Road |
| City Road/Street | Urban Road |

=== Changes in Road Classification (1970–2021) ===
The Strategic Road Network (SSRN 2004) listed 12 National Highways and 51 Feeder Roads in Nepal.

According to SSRN 2017/18, the number of National Highways increased to 18, while the number of Feeder Roads decreased as several routes were upgraded to highway status.

Until 2021, Nepal had only 21 National Highways. In 2021, the government announced 59 additional National Highways and revised the numbering system.

=== Nepal Road Standard after 2021 ===
The Strategic National Highways (SNH 2020/21) classification replaced most feeder roads by either upgrading them to National Highways or transferring them to provincial governments.

== Administration ==
Road administration in Nepal is divided among federal, provincial and local governments. National Highways are managed by the Department of Roads under the Ministry of Infrastructure Development, Provincial Highways are administered by provincial governments, while urban, rural and agricultural roads fall under local governments with support from the Department of Local Infrastructure (DoLI).

Administration of roads in Nepal
| # | Category | Managing Authority | Administrative Body | Coordination With |
|---|---|---|---|---|
| 1 | National Highway | Department of Roads | Federal Government | MoID |
| 2 | Provincial Highway | Provincial Ministries | Provincial Government | Provincial MoID |
| 3 | District Road | DoLI (District Level) | District/Province Government | DoLI |
| 4 | Urban/Rural Road | DoLI (Local Level) | Municipal Government | DoLI |
| 5 | Agricultural Road | DoLI | District/Local Government | DoLI |

== Types of Roads in Nepal ==
Roads in Nepal are classified into several categories based on their administrative responsibility, strategic importance and functional hierarchy. The classification is defined by the Nepal Road Standards (1970, 2013) and later updated through the Strategic Road Network (SRN) and provincial restructuring after 2015.

=== National Highways ===
National Highways form the core of the Strategic Road Network (SRN) and connect major cities, border points and economic corridors. These roads are managed by the Department of Roads under the federal government.

=== Provincial Highways ===
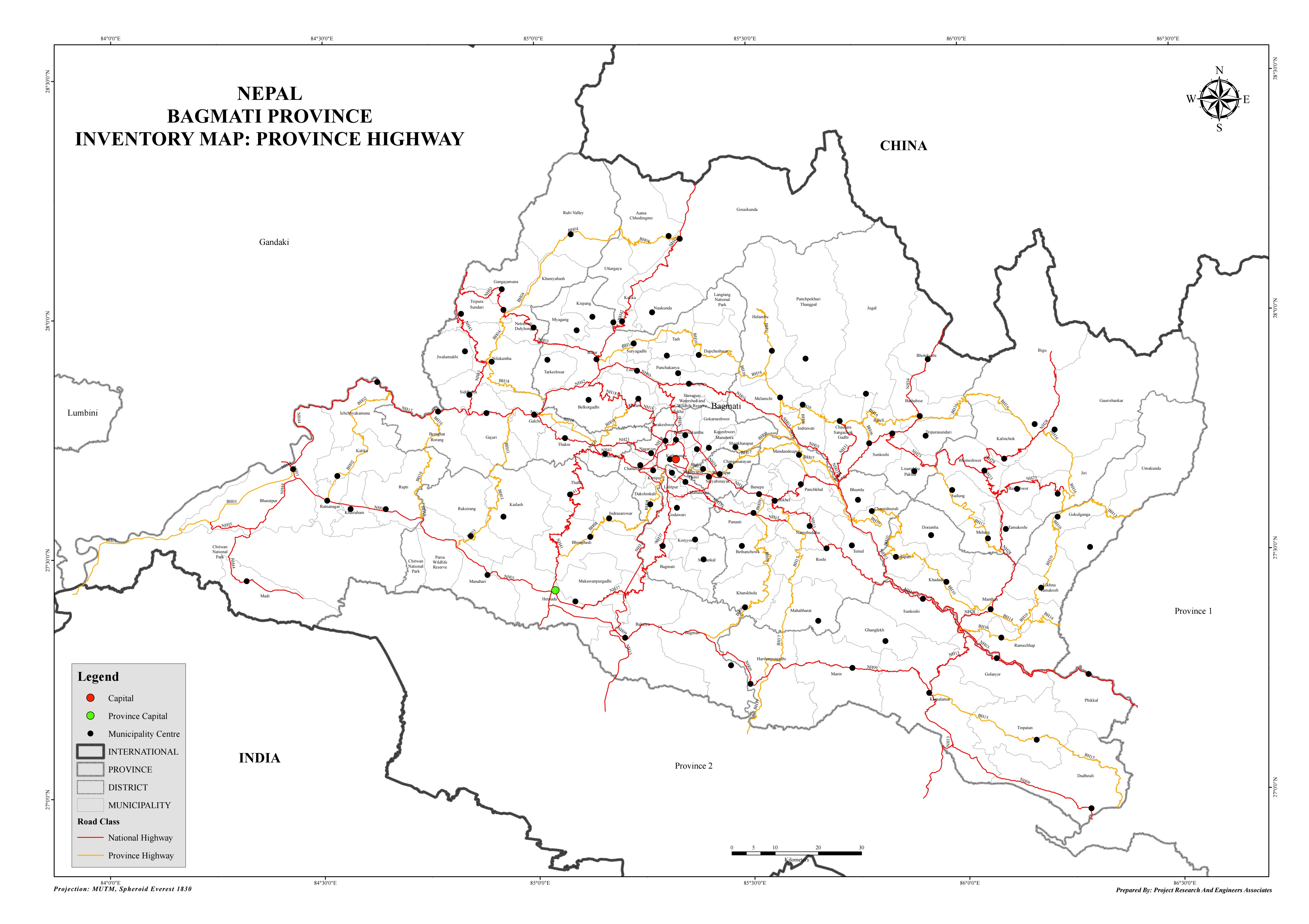
Bagmati Provincial Highway with National Highway

Provincial Highways link district headquarters, major settlements and inter-provincial routes. They are administered by provincial governments following Nepal’s federal restructuring in 2015.

=== District Roads ===
District Roads connect rural municipalities, agricultural areas and local markets. These roads were previously part of the District Development Road System and are now managed by provincial or district-level authorities with support from the Department of Local Infrastructure (DoLI).

=== Urban Roads ===
Urban Roads include city streets, municipal roads and urban link roads. They are managed by municipal governments and are designed according to urban planning standards.

=== Rural and Agricultural Roads ===
These roads provide access to villages, farms and remote settlements. They are constructed and maintained by local governments, often with community participation. Many of these roads are earthen or gravel-surfaced and face challenges related to monsoon damage and maintenance.

== Election Constituency Strategic Roads ==
Election Constituency Strategic Roads are road corridors identified by the Government of Nepal to ensure connectivity within each parliamentary constituency. The concept was introduced to support balanced regional development and to guarantee that every constituency has at least one all‑weather strategic road linking major settlements, markets and administrative centres.

These roads are selected based on population distribution, geographic accessibility, economic importance and the need to improve mobility in remote or underserved areas. Many of these routes overlap with national highways, provincial highways or district roads, but are prioritised for upgrading under strategic development programmes.

The Election Constituency Strategic Road programme aims to:

- improve access to government services,
- support local economic activities,
- enhance disaster response mobility,
- and reduce regional disparities in transportation infrastructure.

== Strategic Road Network ==
The Strategic Road Network (SRN) is the core system of major highways in Nepal that provide national and international connectivity. It includes National Highways, major feeder routes and key north–south and east–west corridors that support mobility, trade, tourism and access to administrative centres.

The SRN is planned, developed and maintained by the Department of Roads (DoR) under the Ministry of Infrastructure Development. Its primary objectives are to ensure reliable all‑weather connectivity, integrate remote regions with national markets, and strengthen cross‑border transport links with India and China.

According to the Strategic Road Network statistics, the SRN consists of:

- National Highways forming the main arterial routes,
- major feeder roads connecting district headquarters,
- north–south corridors linking the Terai, mid‑hills and Himalayan regions,
- and east–west corridors supporting long‑distance travel across the country.

The SRN plays a central role in Nepal’s transport planning, disaster response, economic development and regional integration. Many of the country’s largest infrastructure projects—including the Mid‑Hill Highway, Koshi and Kaligandaki Corridors, and the proposed East–West Himalayan Highway—are part of the SRN framework.

== East–West Corridors ==
Nepal has three officially recognised east–west corridors that provide long‑distance connectivity across the Terai, mid‑hills and Himalayan regions. These corridors form the backbone of the Strategic Road Network (SRN) and support national mobility, trade and regional integration.

=== Mahendra Highway (NH01) ===
The Mahendra Highway, also known as the East–West Highway, is the primary east–west arterial route of Nepal. It runs across the Terai region from Kakarbhitta in the east to Gaddachauki in the west, connecting major border points, industrial centres and market towns. It is the longest and most heavily used highway in the country.

=== Pushpalal Highway (NH03) ===
The Mid‑Hill Highway (Pushpalal Highway) is an east–west corridor running through the mid‑hill region, connecting 215 settlements across 24 districts. It serves as an alternative to the Terai‑based Mahendra Highway and improves access to remote hill districts. The highway supports regional development, tourism and agricultural transport in the hill belt.

=== Himalayan Highway (Proposed) ===
The Himalayan Highway is a proposed high‑altitude east–west corridor intended to connect northern Himalayan districts near the China border. The route aims to enhance cross‑border connectivity, promote tourism and strengthen national security. Once completed, it will form the northernmost east–west link in Nepal’s Strategic Road Network.

=== Madan Bhandari Corridor (NH09) ===
The Madan Bhandari Highway also Inner Terai Highway is a major east–west route extending from Jhapa in the east to Dadeldhura in the west, linking multiple hill districts. It serves as an alternative to the East–West Highway in the mid‑hill region and enhances inter‑provincial connectivity.

=== Postal Highway (Hulaki Rajmarga) (NH05) ===
The Postal Highway, also known as the Terai Border Highway or the southern frontier road, runs parallel to the Nepal–India border across the Terai region. It connects major border towns and supports local mobility, trade and agricultural transport. Although it follows an east–west alignment, it is classified separately from the main east–west corridors due to its strategic role along the southern frontier.

== North–South Corridors ==
North–south corridors are major strategic routes in Nepal that connect the Terai plains with the mid‑hill and Himalayan regions. These corridors play a critical role in improving national integration, facilitating trade, supporting tourism and providing access to remote mountain districts.

The Government of Nepal has prioritised several north–south corridors as part of the Strategic Road Network (SRN). These corridors link major river basins, district headquarters and border points with India and China.

=== Koshi Corridor ===
The Koshi Corridor connects the Terai region of Sunsari and Morang with Dhankuta, Terhathum and Sankhuwasabha, extending toward the northern border near Kimathanka. It supports cross‑border trade with China and provides access to the Arun and Tamor river basins.

=== Kaligandaki Corridor ===
The Kaligandaki Corridor follows the Kaligandaki River valley, linking the Terai districts of Nawalpur and Rupandehi with Palpa, Syangja, Parbat, Myagdi and Mustang. It is one of Nepal’s most important trade and tourism routes, connecting to the Korala border point with China.

=== Karnali Corridor ===
The Karnali Corridor connects the Terai region of Kailali and Bardiya with Surkhet, Dailekh, Jumla, Kalikot, Mugu and Humla. It provides access to some of Nepal’s most remote districts and supports regional development in the Karnali Province.

== See also ==
- Transport in Nepal
- National highways in Nepal
- Provincial highways in Nepal
