= Purchaudi =

Purchaudi पुर्चौडी
- Municipality
- Location within Sudurpashchim Province Location within Nepal
- Coordinates: 29.62°N 80.70°E
- Country: Nepal
- Province: Sudurpashchim
- District: Baitadi
- No. of wards: 10
- Established: 2017
- Incorporated (VDC): Kotila, Bhatana, Bhumiraj, Kuwakot, Nwadeu, Mahadevsthan, Hat, Malladehi, Talladehi and Bijayapur
- Incorporated (date): 2017

Government
  - Type: Mayor–council
  - Body: Purchaudi Municipality

Area
  - Total: 198.52 km^{2} (76.65 sq mi)

Population (2011)
  - Total: 39,174
- Time zone: UTC+05:45 (NPT)
- Website: purchaudimun.gov.np

Purchaudi Municipality is a municipality of Nepal located in Baitadi District of Sudurpashchim Province of Nepal. The municipality was established on 10 March 2017, when Government of Nepal announced 744 local level units as per the new constitution of Nepal 2015.

Kotila, Bhatana, Bhumiraj, Kuwakot, Nwadeu, Mahadevsthan, Hat, Malladehi, Talladehi and Bijayapur villages were merged to form this new local level unit.

Total population of the municipality (2011 Nepal census) is 39174 individuals and the total area of the municipality is 198.52 square kilometres (76.65 sq mi), the municipality is divided into 10 wards. The headquarter of the municipality is situated at Hat town.
