= Dasharathchand =

Dasharathchand दशरथचन्द
- Municipality
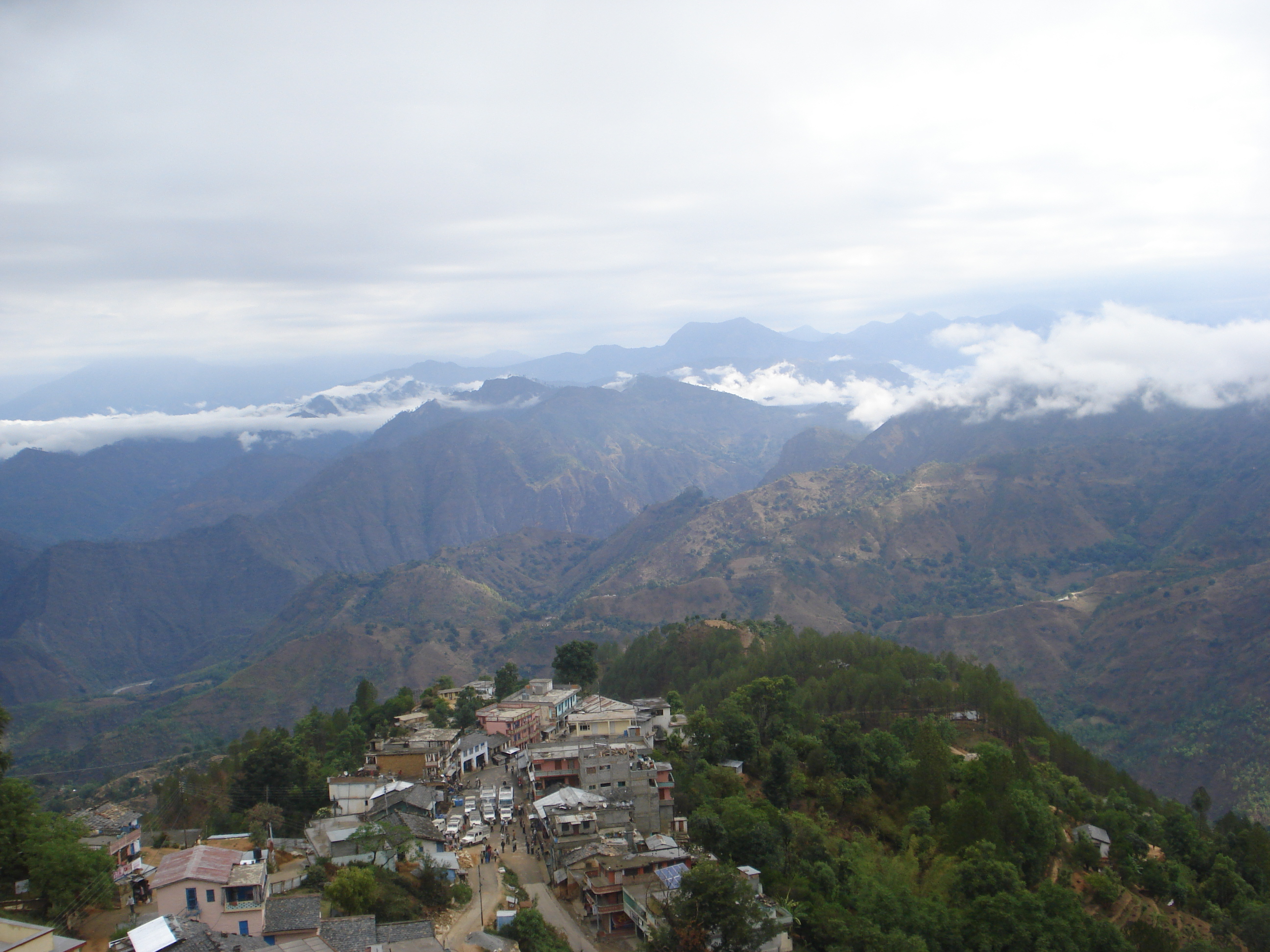
- Hill station, Dashrathchanda

- Location of Dasharathchanda in Sudurpashchim Dasharathchand (Nepal)
- Coordinates: 29°33′17″N 80°25′36″E
- Country: Nepal
- Province: Sudurpashchim Province
- District: Baitadi District
- Wards: 11
- Established: 1997

Government
  - Type: Mayor-council
  - Mayor: Puskar Raj Joshi
  - Deputy Mayor: Kausalia Chand

Area
  - Total: 135.15 km^{2} (52.18 sq mi)

Population (2011)
  - Total: 34,575
  - Density: 255.83/km^{2} (662.59/sq mi)
  - Religions: Hindu
- Time zone: UTC+5:45 (NST)
- Postal code: 10200
- Area code: 095
- Website: dasharathchandmun.gov.np

Dasharathchand is a municipality and the district headquarter of Baitadi District in Sudurpashchim Province of Nepal. It is a hill station above Mahakali River close to the Indian border. At the time of the 2011 Nepal census it had a population of 34,575 people living in 7,257 individual households. It is named in honour of a martyr revolutionary Dashrath Chand (1903–1941).

== Background ==
Dasharatchand municipality was established in 1997 at the time, when the government of Nepal established a total of 22 Municipalities. Six VDCs were merged while establishing this municipality. Those VDCs were: Dashrathchanda, Khalanga, Tripurasundari, Thalegada, Jogannath and Barakot. According to the 2011 Nepal census its total population was 17,427 and total area was 55.01 square kilometres (21.24 sq mi). It was divided into 13 wards.

In March 2017, the Government of Nepal restructured all the local level bodies of Nepal into 753 new local level structures. The previous Gurukhola, Dehimandau, Durga Bhabani, portion of Durgasthan, Gwallek and Nagarjun VDCs merged to the former Dashrathchanda Municipality and rearranged it into 11 wards. Now total population of the Dashrathchanda Municipality is 34,575 individuals and total area is 135.15 square kilometres (52.18 sq mi).

== Media ==
To promote local culture, Dasharathchanda has two FM radio stations – Saugat F.M. (103.6 MHz) and Radio Sunsher (106.6 MHz). There is also Radio Nwedeu, a community radio station.

== Transportation ==
Mahakali Highway links Dasharathchand to Dhangadhi in the South and Api Municipality in the North.

== Climate ==
Climate data for Dasharathchand, elevation 1,635 m (5,364 ft)
Month	Jan	Feb	Mar	Apr	May	Jun	Jul	Aug	Sep	Oct	Nov	Dec	Year
Mean daily maximum °C (°F)	14.6 (58.3)	17.0 (62.6)	21.5 (70.7)	28.0 (82.4)	30.2 (86.4)	29.2 (84.6)	25.8 (78.4)	25.6 (78.1)	25.2 (77.4)	23.3 (73.9)	18.0 (64.4)	15.0 (59.0)	22.8 (73.0)
Daily mean °C (°F)	9.1 (48.4)	10.8 (51.4)	15.3 (59.5)	20.2 (68.4)	22.5 (72.5)	23.2 (73.8)	21.7 (71.1)	21.5 (70.7)	20.6 (69.1)	17.7 (63.9)	12.5 (54.5)	9.6 (49.3)	17.1 (62.7)
Mean daily minimum °C (°F)	3.9 (39.0)	4.8 (40.6)	9.3 (48.7)	12.5 (54.5)	14.8 (58.6)	17.2 (63.0)	17.5 (63.5)	17.5 (63.5)	16.0 (60.8)	12.0 (53.6)	7.0 (44.6)	4.1 (39.4)	11.4 (52.5)
Average precipitation mm (inches)	41.3 (1.63)	57.1 (2.25)	56.5 (2.22)	55.1 (2.17)	128.2 (5.05)	198.4 (7.81)	307.9 (12.12)	260.8 (10.27)	161.1 (6.34)	46.3 (1.82)	7.8 (0.31)	27.4 (1.08)	1,347.9 (53.07)
Source: FAO JICA
