= Patan, Baitadi =

Patan Municipality पाटन नगरपालिका
- Municipality
- Location in Nepal
- Coordinates: 29°28′36″N 80°33′57″E
- Country: Nepal
- Zone: Mahakali Zone
- District: Baitadi District

Government
  - Mayor: Gauri Singh Rawal
  - Deputy Mayor: Kamal API Bohora

Area
  - Total: 119.6 km^{2} (46.2 sq mi)

Population (2011 Nepal census)
  - Total: 19,911
  - Density: 166.5/km^{2} (431.2/sq mi)
  - Religions: Hindu Buddhist
- Time zone: UTC+5:45 (NST)
- Website: www.patanmun.gov.np/en

Patan is a municipality in Baitadi District in the Mahakali Zone in Sudurpaschim Province of Far-western Nepal. The new municipality was formed by merging six existing villages Sakar, Silanga, Bhumeswor Gujar Basantapur and Patan on 2 December 2014. The office of the municipality is that of the former Patan village development committee. There are 10 wards in Patan

== Population ==
Patan municipality is formed by merging Sakar, Silanga, Bhumeswor Gujar, Basantapur and Patan. It has a total population of 19,911 according to[2011 Nepal census].

== Introduction ==
Patan is a beautiful place located in the central part of Baitadi district. This place is surrounded by the beautiful hills including pine forests. The valley is slightly sloping to the south. Patan valley is famous for rice cultivation. At the bottom of this village there is Surnaya river is streaming which is main river of this area. This place is located in between Dadeldhura And Baitadi Khalanga. In this municipality many District level governmental offices are situated like Children or Woman development office, District Animal care office, District irrigation office, District landslide rescue office, District Family planning association of Nepal and many other offices. In this area it has Hydro power about of 250 Kilowatt power which provides Electricity within its area. Climate is medium (nor very hot neither very cool) it belongs to mid hill region. Mainly in this area specially (Bista Bist Bisht), Brahmin, Chhetri and Thakuri peoples are living. Mainly people of this area depends on Agriculture but other occupation is also income source.

== Education ==
Bhimdutta Polytechnic Institute is located in Patan. It is a constituent institute of CTEVT which runs diploma programs in agriculture, engineering among others.

== Transportation ==
The town is linked to the national highway network through Bhimdutta Highway and the recent Mid-Hill Highway/Pushpalal Highway. Patan lies 185km north of Dhangadhi, the provincial capital of Sudurpashchim Province. [Baitadi Airport] in Patan has been recently upgraded with a black-topped runway. However, flights have currently stopped operation due to lack of sufficient passengers.

== Issues ==
Patan is one of the ten alleged smart-cities the Government of Nepal aims to build along the Mid-Hill Highway/Pusphpalal Highway running east-west. This decision from government has raised debate in fear of converting the fertile valley of Patan into concretized city. Therefore there is a risk of losing a famous rice-cultivating valley of the Baitadi district. According to experts, the impact can be minimized by planning to build a circular city around the periphery while preserving the central valley for farming. A circular city model imagines to build a ring-road at the edges of the valley. Settlement has to be allowed only within a small distance from the ring-road which gives the city a circular or ring shape.
