= Kande (Nepal) =

Village in the far western region of Nepal

Kande, historical name "Kane" (काणे), is a small village in the far western region of Nepal, part of the Baitadi District in Gurukhola, 01-Dasharathchand Municipality. Kande comprises 412 houses and covers an area of 4,856 sq.m. The villagers are called Bhatt. Kande consist of a market Mushyachour which includes Gurukhola (Talli Gurukhola and Malli Gurukhola), Milanchouk, and main market Mushyachour where goods are directly imported from Dhangadhi and Jhulaghat ; lies at the north of Rataidi Community Forest of Kande.

== Popularity ==
There are a lot of religious and tourists areas in Kande. Some of the most prominent places are Kailpal Temple, Maharudra Area, Jhaulekh, Rataidi Conserved Area, Sirad Hill Station, and Santbaj Hill Station.

== Festivals Cultures and Religions ==
Gaura Parva is the main festival of Kande; it is also a national holiday in Nepal. Besides this there are many festivals like Bishpati, where the brothers and sisters-in-law have a funny fight using water and stinging nettle (sisnu). Dashain and Tihar are also equally celebrated.

== Sports ==
Cricket is a very popular sport in Kande, and Kande has won many regional competitions. Beside cricket, Volleyball is another game which is equally played by the people of Kande Rataidi Cricket Club and Brightstar Volleyball team are the respective cricket and volleyball teams.

== Communication ==
Mostly, the users of sky phone, namaste, and ncell are found in Kanday. It holds a radio station i.e. Radio Ninglashaini 94 MHz.

== Agriculture ==
Corn and wheat are the main crops of this area. Some vegetables and fruits are grown and exported to nearby market Mushyachour -particularly cabbage, potatoes, tomatoes, mandarins, orange, lemons.
