= Maunali =

Bhauneli भौनेली
- Village development committee
- Location in Nepal
- Coordinates: 29.54°N 80.56°E
- Country: Nepal
- Zone: Mahakali Zone
- District: Baitadi District

Population (1991)
  - Total: 2,474
  - Religions: Hindu
- Time zone: UTC+5:45 (Nepal Time)

Maunali is a village development committee in Baitadi District in the Mahakali Zone of western Nepal. At the time of the 1991 Nepal census it had a population of 2,474 and had 462 houses in the village.
