= Mathairaj =

Coordinates: 29°39′N 80°40′E

Mathairaj मठैराज
- Village development committee
- Interactive map of Mathairaj
- Country: Nepal
- Zone: Mahakali Zone
- District: Baitadi District

Population (2011)
  - Total: 3,004
  - Religions: Hindu
- Time zone: UTC+5:45 (Nepal Time)

Mathairaj is a village development committee in Baitadi District in the Mahakali Zone of western Nepal. At the time of the 2011 Nepal census it had a population of 3,004 and had 537 houses in the village.
