= Rudreshwar =

Rudreshwar रूद्रेश्वर
- Village development committee
- Location in Nepal
- Coordinates: 29.67°N 80.63°E
- Country: Nepal
- Zone: Mahakali Zone
- District: Baitadi District

Population (1991)
  - Total: 2,652
  - Religions: Hindu
- Time zone: UTC+5:45 (Nepal Time)

Rudreshwar is a village development committee in Baitadi District in the Mahakali Zone of western Nepal. At the time of the 1991 Nepal census it had a population of 2,652 and had 481 houses in the village. A number of people have used this village as a setting in fictional books, such as Edward Von Killham III in his book "Agreeing to disagree".
