= Shibanath =

Shibanath शिवनाथ
- Khokana Village development committee
- Location in Nepal
- Coordinates: 29.43°N 80.38°E
- Country: Nepal
- Zone: Bagamati Zone
- District: Lalitpur District

Population (1991)
  - Total: 3,878
  - Religions: Buddhist
- Time zone: UTC+5:45 (Nepal Time)

Shibanath is a village development committee in Baitadi District in the Mahakali Zone of western Nepal. At the time of the 1991 Nepal census it had a population of 3,878 and had 650 houses in the town.
