= Mahakali, Baitadi =

Mahakali, Nepal महाकाली
- Village development committee
- Location in Nepal
- Coordinates: 29.39°N 80.30°E
- Country: Nepal
- Zone: Mahakali Zone
- District: Baitadi District
- Established: =

Population (1991)
  - Total: 2,589
  - Density: 201/km^{2} (520/sq mi)
  - Hindu: Hindu
- Time zone: UTC+5:45 (Nepal Time)

Mahakali is a village development committee in Baitadi District in the Mahakali Zone of western Nepal. It is located on the Mahakali River which is also the border with Uttarakhand state, India across from Jhulaghat. Amraad and Basku are main places in this village. Indian and Nepalese nationals cross without restrictions, however there is a customs checkpoint for goods.

== Demographics ==
At the time of the 1991 Nepal census it had a population of 2,589 and had 412 houses in the village.
