= Dhikarim =

Coordinates: 29.6200°N 80.7000°E

Dhikarim ढिकारिम
- Village development committee
- Interactive map of Dhikarim
- Country: Nepal
- Zone: Mahakali Zone
- District: Baitadi District

Population (1991)
  - Total: 3,497
  - Religions: Hindu
- Time zone: UTC+5:45 (Nepal Time)

Dhikarim is a village development committee in Baitadi District in the Mahakali Zone of western Nepal. At the time of the 1991 Nepal census it had a population of 3,497 and had 636 houses in the town.
