= Hatraj =

Hatraj हाटराज
- Village development committee
- Location in Nepal
- Coordinates: 29.55°N 80.50°E
- Country: Nepal
- Zone: Mahakali Zone
- District: Baitadi District

Population
  - Religions: Hindu
- Time zone: UTC+5:45 (Nepal Time)

Hatraj is a village development committee in Baitadi District in the Mahakali Zone of western Nepal.
