= Raudidewal =

Rodidewal Pancheshwar NO No
- Village development committee
- Nickname: NO
- Location in Nepal
- Coordinates: 29.47°N 80.35°E
- Country: Nepal
- Zone: Mahakali Zone
- District: Pancheshwar Baitadi District

Population (1991)
  - Total: 3,476
  - Religions: Hindu
- Time zone: UTC+5:45 (Nepal Time)

Rodidewal is a village development committee in Baitadi District in the Mahakali Zone of western Nepal. At the time of the 1991 Nepal census it had a population 3,476 and had 670 houses in the village.
