= Kotila =

Kotila may refer to:

- Kotila, Mahakali, Nepal
- Kotila, Seti, Nepal
