= Sakar, Nepal =

Sakar, Nepal साकार
- Village development committee
- Location in Nepal
- Coordinates: 29.43°N 80.52°E
- Country: Nepal
- Zone: Mahakali Zone
- District: Baitadi District

Population (1991)
  - Total: 2,996
  - Religions: Hindu
- Time zone: UTC+5:45 (Nepal Time)

Sakar is a village development committee in Baitadi District in the Mahakali Zone of western Nepal. At the time of the 1991 Nepal census it had a population of 2,996 and had 484 houses in the village. Sakar in Nepali means "dream come true".
