= Pokhara Zero K.M. =

Road in Gandaki, Nepal

Pokhara Zero K.M. पोखरा जीरो के.एम.
- Location in Nepal Pokhara Zero K.M. (Nepal)
- Coordinates: 28.212840°N 83.975398°E
- Country: Nepal
- Province: Gandaki
- City: Pokhara
- Time zone: +5:45 (Nepali Time)

Pokhara Zero K.M. (Nepali: पोखरा जीरो के.एम.) is a junction located at the intersection of the Phewa Marga and Pokhara Baglung Highways, in Wards 5 and 7 of Pokhara, Nepal. Pokhara is the capital of Gandaki Province and the second largest metropolitan city in Nepal in terms of population.

== Transportation ==
Local public transportation consists of city buses, micros, micro-buses and metered taxis. A privately-run public transport system operates within the city, as well as within the adjoining towns and nearby villages.

Currently, the Pokhara Regional International Airport is under construction in Kaski, Nepal. It will replace the existing Pokhara International Airport, which was commissioned in July 1958. Operations are scheduled to begin in 2021.
