= Deulek =

Coordinates: 29°35′N 80°32′E

Deulek देउलेक
- Village development committee
- Interactive map of Deulek
- Country: Nepal
- Zone: Mahakali Zone
- District: Baitadi District

Population (1991)
  - Total: 3,207
  - Religions: Hindu
- Time zone: UTC+5:45 (Nepal Time)

Deulek is a village development committee in Baitadi District in the Mahakali Zone of western Nepal. At the time of the 1991 Nepal census, the village had a population of 2,004 and had 354 houses.
