= Hat, Nepal =

Coordinates: 29.62°N 80.70°E

Hat, Nepal हाट
- Village development committee
- Interactive map of Hat, Nepal
- Country: Nepal
- Zone: Mahakali Zone
- District: Baitadi District

Population (1991)
  - Total: 1,834
  - Religions: Hindu
- Time zone: UTC+5:45 (Nepal Time)

Hat was a village development committee in Baitadi District in the Mahakali Zone of western Nepal. At the time of the 1991 Nepal census it had a population of 1,834 and had 330 houses in the village. In 2017 it was merged into Purchaudi Municipality as Municipality headquatar.
