= Kailpal =

Kailpal village कैलपाल
- Village development committee
- Location in Nepal
- Coordinates: 29.41°N 80.51°E
- Country: Nepal
- Zone: Mahakali Zone
- District: Baitadi District

Population (2011)
  - Total: 3,074
  - Religions: Hindu
- Time zone: UTC+5:45 (Nepal Time)

Kailpal (Nepali: कैलपाल) is a village development committee in Baitadi District in the Mahakali Zone of western Nepal. At the time of the 2011 Nepal census it had a population of 3,074 and had 541 houses in the village.
