= Srikedar =

Coordinates: 29.5833°N 80.5000°E

Srikedar श्रीकेदार
- Village development committee
- Interactive map of Srikedar
- Country: Nepal
- Zone: Mahakali Zone
- District: Baitadi District

Population (1991)
  - Total: 2,081
  - Religions: Hindu
- Time zone: UTC+5:45 (Nepal Time)

Srikedar is a village development committee in Baitadi District in the Mahakali Zone of western Nepal. At the time of the 1991 Nepal census it had a population of 2,081 and had 389 houses in the village.
