= Jogannath =

Jagannath जोगन्नाथ
- Village development committee
- Country: Nepal
- Zone: Mahakali Zone
- District: Baitadi District

Population (1991)
  - Total: 2,094
  - Religions: Hindu
- Time zone: UTC+5:45 (Nepal Time)

Jogannath is a village development committee in Baitadi District in the Mahakali Zone of western Nepal. At the time of the 1991 Nepal census it had a population of 2,094 and had 393 houses in the village.
