= Amchaur =

Place in Nepal

Amchaur आमचौर
- Village Development Committee
- Location in Nepal
- Coordinates: 29.45°N 80.33°E
- Country: Nepal
- Province: Sudurpashchim Province
- District: Baitadi District

Population (1991)
  - Total: 3,852
  - Religions: Hindu
- Time zone: UTC+5:45 (Nepal Time)

Amchaur is a small town and Village Development Committee in Baitadi District in Sudurpashchim Province of western Nepal. At the time of the 1991 Nepal census it had a population of 3,852 and had 700 houses in the town.
