= Melauli =

Melauli Municipality मेलौली नगरपालिका
- Municipality
- Nickname: Melauli
- Location in Nepal
- Coordinates: 29.41°N 80.44°E
- Country: Nepal
- Province: Sudurpashchim
- District: Baitadi

Government
  - Mayor: Krishna Singh Nayak(NC)
  - Deputy Mayor: Kumari Radha Ojha(NC)

Population (2022)
  - Total: 22,545
  - Religions: Hindu
- Time zone: UTC+5:45 (Nepal Time)
- Website: melaulimun.gov.np

Melauli is a Municipality in Baitadi District in the Mahakali Zone in Sudurpaschim province of far-western Nepal. At the time of the 2022 Nepal census it had a population of 20,658 and had 4536 houses in the town.
