= Gujar, Nepal =

Gujar, Nepal गुजर
- Village development committee
- Location in Nepal
- Coordinates: 29.48°N 80.58°E
- Country: Nepal
- Zone: Mahakali Zone
- District: Baitadi District

Population (1991)
  - Total: 2,567
  - Religions: Hindu
- Time zone: UTC+5:45 (Nepal Time)

Gujar is a village development committee in Baitadi District in the Mahakali Zone of western Nepal. At the time of the 1991 Nepal census it had a population of 2,567 and had 475 houses in the town. It's on a countryside surrounded by dense forest and hills.
