= Maharudra =

Maharudra महारुद्र
- Village development committee
- Location in Nepal
- Coordinates: 29.43°N 80.41°E
- Country: Nepal
- Zone: Mahakali Zone
- District: Baitadi District

Population (1991)
  - Total: 3,182
  - Religions: Hindu
- Time zone: UTC+5:45 (Nepal Time)

Maharudra is a village development committee in Baitadi District in the Mahakali Zone of western Nepal. At the time of the 1991 Nepal census it had a population of 3,182 and had 588 houses in the town.
