= Gokuleswor =

Gokuleswor may refer to:

- Gokuleswor, Baitadi
- Gokuleswor, Darchula
