= Pushpalal Highway =

Road in Nepal

Pushpalal Mid-hills Highway पुष्पलाल मध्यपहाडी लोकमार्ग
- राष्ट्रिय राजमार्ग ०३
- National Highway 03
- NH03 in red

Route information
- Maintained by MoPIT (Department of Roads)
- Length: 1,879 km (1,168 mi)

Major junctions
- From: Chiyo Bhanjyang, Panchthar
- NH02 at Phidim NH04 at Birtamod; NH10 at Basantapur; NH08 at Hile; NH16 at Daphe; NH20 at Hilepani; NH13 at Khurkot; NH28 at Khurkot; NH34 at Dolalghat-Majhigau NH31 at Majhigau
- To: Jhulaghat, Baitadi

Location
- Country: Nepal

Highway system
- Roads in Nepal
← NH02	→ NH04

Pushpalal Highway (NH03) (previously: H18) (Nepali: पुष्पलाल लोकमार्ग, Puṣpalāl Lōkamār is an ongoing road project in Nepal, which is thought to be 1,776 kilometres (1,104 mi) long. After completion, it will be the longest national highway of Nepal. Nepal has three geographical regions from east to west, plain land or Terai in south, higher mountains or Himalayas in north and hills in middle region. The highway runs through the mid-hills region only. It starts from easternmost hill at Chiyo Bhanjyang of Panchthar District (Koshi province) and ends at westernmost hill at Jhulaghat of Baitadi District in far west (Sudurpashchim Province).

== Pokhara–Baglung section ==
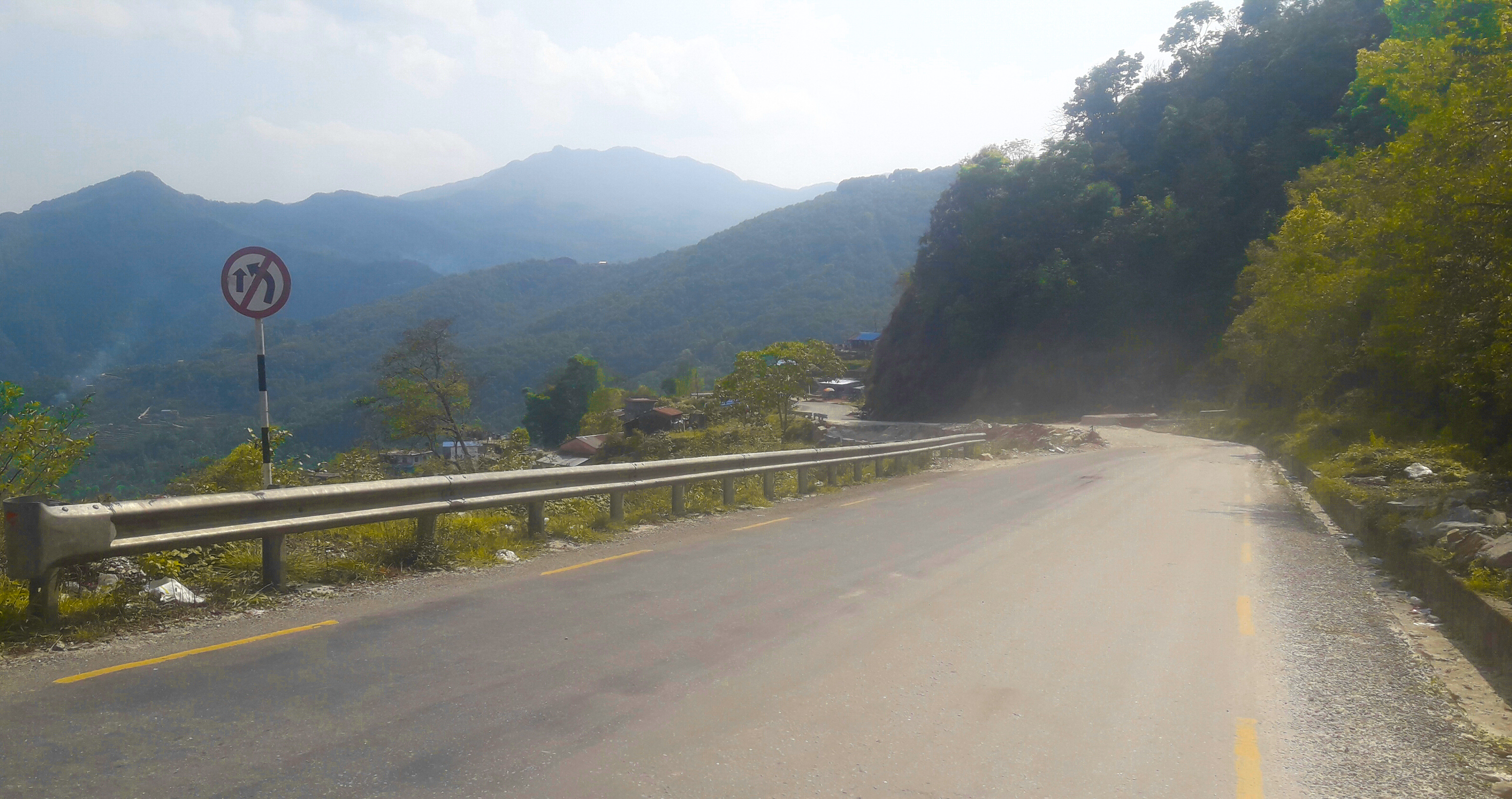
Pokhara Baglung Highway from Kande kaski

The Pokhara Baglung section is a 72-kilometre (45 mi) stretch of road that begins at Zero Kilometer, Pokhara, and ends in the municipality of Baglung in Gandaki Province, Nepal.

== Silagadhi-Syaule Bazar Section ==
Silagadhi-Syaule Bazar section (previously Seti Highway (H15) is a part of Pushpalal Highway in the western region of Nepal. This highway links the towns of Amargadhi, the district headquarter of Dadeldhura, and Dipayal Silgadhi, the district headquarter of Doti.

The 66 km long highway begins in Amargadhi, where it branches off Mahakali Highway. It runs along Seti River and ends in Dipayal Silgadhi.

== See also ==
- Madan Bhandari Inner Terai Highway
- Mahendra Highway
