= Srikot =

Srikot श्रीकोट
- Village development committee
- Location in Nepal
- Coordinates: 29.57°N 80.53°E
- Country: Nepal
- Zone: Mahakali Zone
- District: Baitadi District

Population (1991)
  - Total: 3,076
  - Religions: Hindu
- Time zone: UTC+5:45 (Nepal Time)

Srikot is a village development committee in Baitadi District in the Mahakali Zone of western Nepal. At the time of the 1991 Nepal census it had a population of 3,076 and had 498 houses in the village.

The road from Dhangadi to Gokule passes through Sreekot. Since roads are scarce in Baitadi, Sreekot serves as a de facto transportation hub for all the small villages which surround it. Sreekot also has a small bazaar, supplied by trucks, which is the commercial center for the immediately surrounding area. Some agricultural products (rice, lentils, occasionally vegetables when in season) are sold, as well as other commodities (kerosene, school books, pens and ink).
