= Gajari =

Gajari गाजरी
- Village development committee
- Location in Nepal
- Coordinates: 29.46°N 80.72°E
- Country: Nepal
- Zone: Mahakali Zone
- District: Baitadi District

Population (1991)
  - Total: 3,190
  - Religions: Hindu
- Time zone: UTC+5:45 (Nepal Time)

Gajari is a village development committee in Baitadi District in the Mahakali Zone of western Nepal. At the time of the 1991 Nepal census it had a population of 3,190 and had 480 houses in the town.
