= Lukenya Hill =

- Site location in Kenya
- 1°27′S 37°04′E
- Region: East Africa

Microliths from different raw materials

Lukenya Hill is an inselberg in the Athi-Kapiti Plain of southern Kenya that contains over 300 archaeological sites at its base, believed to date from the later Pleistocene through the Holocene. The word Lukenya is derived from a Maasai word that loosely translates as “thick fog.” The area spans over 16km^{2} in size.

Many Later Stone Age (LSA) rockshelter sites have been found on the southeastern side of Lukenya Hill. A hominid (KNM-LH1) was found at one of the sites at Lukenya Hill, GvJm22, and is associated with an LSA deposit dating to the late Pleistocene period. This fossil provides important evidence for understanding evolutionary differences in skeletal remains between the late Pleistocene and Holocene periods.

== Geology and environment ==
The geography of Lukenya Hill consists of a Precambrian gneiss insenberg rising approximately 200 to 300 meters above ground. There are numerous rockshelters at its base. Currently, this area is semi-arid with extensive acacia vegetation. Two sporadic rainy seasons characterize the area, which receives approximately 500 mm of precipitation per year. While irregular, the long rains tend to occur from March to May while the short rains take place between October and December.

== Foundational research at Lukenya Hill ==
Foundational research was conducted from 1970-1980 at several Lukenya Hill sites. Richard Gramly excavated GvJm22 between 1970 and 1973. This site includes both Pleistocene and Holocene deposits, including a Pastoral Neolithic occupation with microliths and multiple ceramic types. In 1975 and 1976, John Bower, Charles Nelson, and colleagues test excavated GvJm42, GvJm44, and GvJm47 as part of a university field school, with later work at the Pastoral Neolithic site GvJm52 (Silanga) in 1978. Sibel Kusimba also excavated Later Stone Age sites at Lukenya Hill, and specialist studies have been conducted on faunal remains.

== Later Stone Age occupation ==
Throughout the Late Pleistocene and into the Holocene, Later Stone Age (LSA) hunter-gatherers occupied several sites at Lukenya Hill such as GvJm16, GvJm19, GvJm46, and GvJm62. Findings from Lukenya Hill have been important to the study of the behavior and land-use patterns of LSA hunter-gatherers. Excavations have produced varying lithics made from materials such as quartz, chert, and local and non-local obsidians. At GvJm22, a hominid calvaria (KNM-LH1) has been dated to approximately 23,000 years old.

Faunal remains from GvJm22 date from 52,000 years to 12,000 years ago. The remains include both extinct grazers (Damaliscus Hypsodon) and extant (Equus quagga, Alcelaphus buselaphus, Eudorcas thomsoni) fauna.

GvJm19 is a Holocene site associated with ceramics, lithics and limited number of faunal remains; many of these remains are grazers such as zebra, hartebeest and reedbuck.

Potsherd,bones and ostrich eggshells material remains at Lukenya Hill

== Pastoral Neolithic occupation ==
Isotopic evidence from faunal remains have shown a Holocene period dating about 9 to 4.5 thousand years ago. This period started with woody environments persisting in the later Holocene, which demonstrated open grassland. Lukenya has not experienced any major climatic shifts during the Holocene period with very neutral conditions that are seen to be conducive for hunter gatherers.

Radiocarbon dating has placed the earliest pastoralists of this area at the Silanga GvJm 52 site on the eastern side of Lukenya Hill at approximately 1900 to 1600 years ago. Foundational researchers in this area such as Charles Nelson found depositions of sediments and stone arrangements that suggested possible settlement. Magnetometry evidence further pointed out that pastoralists settlements in Silanga did not socially disperse their livestock middens unlike contemporary eastern Africa herders. This evidence has proven to be significant in the study of pastoralist use of space and landscape in general. Unpublished work has shown possible evidence of livestock mobility in a number of sites, these may possibly signal animal exchange though there is limited research that supports this analogy.

The term Lukenyian industry is coined from the lithic industry of the pastoral Neolithic groups found in five localities of Lukenya Hill mostly made up of segmented stone blades from different raw materials.

There has also been evidence of ceramic in the area that has been linked ancient pastoralists of this area. the ceramic styles found in Lukenya Hill at Silanga are the Narosura ware and Lukenya ware.
