= Dhungad =

Dhungad ढुङगढ
- Village development committee
- Location in Nepal
- Coordinates: 29.38°N 80.81°E
- Country: Nepal
- Zone: Mahakali Zone
- District: Baitadi District

Population
  - Religions: Hindu
- Time zone: UTC+5:45 (Nepal Time)

Dhungad is the ward of Shigas rural municipality in Baitadi District of the Mahakali Zone of western Nepal. Which is located in the eastern part from the headquarter of Baitadi district, this is the small ward which is crossed by Seti river. Here are living so many communities. Which are chettry, under chettry (Dhami, Saud, Khadayat, Thapa, Rokaya), Barahaman under cast (Awasthi), Thakuri, and Dalit community like B.K., Nepali, Chunara, etc. in this ward, there are no other religion people are living only Hindu people are living . there are totally around six school. in which, two school are higher secondary and other are primary. there is no transportation to reach up to there it takes four hour trekking from nearest place ghovghat. Here most of the people are unemployed and they rely on ancient farming. Most people would go to India to earn money in winter after harvest.
