= Bhumiraj, Baitadi =

Bhumiraj भूमिराज
- Village development committee
- Location in Nepal
- Coordinates: 29.56°N 80.73°E
- Country: Nepal
- Zone: Mahakali Zone
- District: Baitadi District

Population (1991)
  - Total: 3,081
  - Religions: Hindu
- Time zone: UTC+5:45 (Nepal Time)

Bhumiraj is a village development committee in Baitadi District in the Mahakali Zone of western Nepal. At the time of the 1991 Nepal census it had a population of 3,081 and had 516 houses in the village. There are some subzones(Nepali:टोल ) named by Kaphaldhunga, Mankali, Naina, Kuweligaun, Dharudi, Khadayatgaun and Rapana
