= Dilasaini =

Dilasaini डिलासैनि Dilashainee (डिलाशैनी)
- Gaunpalika
- Location in Nepal
- Coordinates: 29.65°N 80.60°E
- Country: Nepal
- Province: Sudurpashchim Province
- District: Baitadi District

Population (1991)
  - Total: 3,207
  - Religions: Hindu
- Time zone: UTC+5:45 (Nepal Time)

Dilasaini is a former village development committee that is now a Rural Municipality in Baitadi District in Sudurpashchim Province of western Nepal. At the time of the 1991 Nepal census, it had a population of 4,828 and had 849 houses in the village. There is one plus two (affiliated to HSEB), two high schools and many primary schools in the VDC. This VDC is bordered by Mathairaj, Gokuleshwor, Rudreswor, and Rim VDC and Darchula district in the northwest. This VDC is named after a local deity (a manifestation of Hindu Goddess Durga). The temple of this devi is located in Dhamigaun which is one of the wards of the VDC. This temple is famous in far-western Nepal for the sacrifice of huge number of bull buffaloes on occasion of Dashain.
