= Durga Bhabani =

Durga Bhabani दुर्गा भवानी
- Village development committee
- Location in Nepal
- Coordinates: 29.56°N 80.46°E
- Country: Nepal
- Zone: Mahakali Zone
- District: Baitadi District

Population (1991)
  - Total: 2,052
  - Religions: Hindu
- Time zone: UTC+5:45 (Nepal Time)

Durga Bhabani is a village development committee in Baitadi District in the Mahakali Zone of western Nepal. At the time of the 1991 Nepal census it had a population of 2,052 and had 410 houses in the village.
