= District Courts of Nepal =

Third layer of courts

District courts (Nepali: जिल्ला अदालत) in Nepal are the third layer of court after Supreme Court and High Courts. Each district in Nepal has a district court, thus seventy-seven District courts exist in Nepal. The District court has the power to hear the appeal case of the Local level judicial bodies established in each local body. The Local level judicial committee is subordinate to the District Court. The District court is the general trial court of criminal and civil cases with both government party and private party cases.

Article 148, 149, 150 and 151 of Constitution of Nepal, 2015 defines District Courts, appointment, qualification, terms and remuneration of chief justices.

== List of District Courts ==
Court	Judge	Website
Koshi Province
Bhojpur District	Gehendra Raj Pant	supremecourt.gov.np/court/bhojpurdc
Dhankuta District	Phandindra Prasad Parajuli	supremecourt.gov.np/court/dhankutadc
Ilam District	Harish Chandra Ingnam	supremecourt.gov.np/court/ilamdc
Jhapa District	Giriraj Gautam, Tikaram Acharya, Narayan Prasad Parajuli, Shanker Bahadur Rai, Binod Khatiwada, Indira Sharma and Dil Kumar Bardewa	supremecourt.gov.np/court/jhapadc
Khotang District	Matrika Prasad Acharya	supremecourt.gov.np/court/khotangdc
Morang District	Bharat Lamsal, Shishirraj Dhakal, Kishor Ghimire, Manoj KC, Ishwor Parajuli, Tej Bahadur Khadka, Sudarshan Lamichhane, Kapilmani Gautam, Durga Khadka, Roshan Bhattrai	supremecourt.gov.np/court/morangdc
Okhaldhunga District	Dal Bahadur K.C.	supremecourt.gov.np/court/okhaldhungadc
Panchthar District	Yogendra Prasad Shah	supremecourt.gov.np/court/panchthardc
Sankhuwasabha District	Shanti Prasad Achaya	supremecourt.gov.np/court/sankhuwasabhadc
Solukhumbu District	Santosh Prasad Parajuli	supremecourt.gov.np/court/solukhumbudc
Sunsari District court	Kailash Prasad Subedi, Subashbabu Puri, Deepak Kumar Dahal, Hem Bahadur Sen, Prakash Shrestha, Tikendra Dahal, Ramchandra Khadka, Nirmala Yongwa	supremecourt.gov.np/court/sunsaridc
Taplejung District	Prakash Raut	supremecourt.gov.np/court/taplejungdc
Terhathum District	Mahendra Prasad Pokharel	supremecourt.gov.np/court/terhathumdc
Udayapur District	Dipak Khanal	supremecourt.gov.np/court/udayapurdc
Madhesh Province
Bara District	Khil Nath Regmi	supremecourt.gov.np/court/baradc
Dhanusha District	Brajesh Pyakurel	supremecourt.gov.np/court/dhanushadc
Mahottari District	Dipak Kumar Kharel	supremecourt.gov.np/court/mahottaridc
Parsa District	Dharmaraj Paudel	supremecourt.gov.np/court/parsadc
Rautahat District	Kaji Bahadur Rai	supremecourt.gov.np/court/rautahatdc
Saptari District	Chandra Mani Gyawali	supremecourt.gov.np/court/saptaridc
Sarlahi District		supremecourt.gov.np/court/sarlahidc
Siraha District	Prakash Kharel	supremecourt.gov.np/court/sirahadc
Bagmati Province
Bhaktapur District	Gopal Prasad Bastola	supremecourt.gov.np/court/bhaktapurdc
Chitwan District	Hemnath Rawal	supremecourt.gov.np/court/chitwandc
Dhading District	Devendra Paudel	supremecourt.gov.np/court/dhadingdc
Dolakha District	Kavi Prasad Neupane	supremecourt.gov.np/court/dolakhadc
Kathmandu District	Raju Kumar Khatiwada	supremecourt.gov.np/court/kathmandudc
Kavrepalanchok District	Purushottam Prasad Dhakal	supremecourt.gov.np/court/kavrepalanchowkdc
Lalitpur District	Kiran Prasad Shiwakoti	supremecourt.gov.np/court/lalitpurdc
Makwanpur District	Dilli Ratna Shrestha	supremecourt.gov.np/court/makwanpurdc
Nuwakot District	Umesh Prasad Luitel	supremecourt.gov.np/court/nuwakotdc
Ramechhap District	Mohan Raj Bhattarai	supremecourt.gov.np/court/ramechapdc
Rasuwa District	Rajendra Nepal	supremecourt.gov.np/court/rasuwadc
Sindhuli District	Santosh Prasad Parajuli	supremecourt.gov.np/court/sindhulidc
Sindhupalchok District	Mahendra Bahadur Karki	supremecourt.gov.np/court/sindhupalchowkdc
Gandaki Province
Baglung District	Basudev Neupane	supremecourt.gov.np/court/baglungdc
Gorkha District	Ramesh Kant Adhikari	supremecourt.gov.np/court/gorkhadc
Kaski District	Tejendra Prasad Sharma	supremecourt.gov.np/court/kaskidc
Lamjung District	Harish Chandra Dhungana	supremecourt.gov.np/court/lamjungdc
Manang District	Chandra Prakash Tiwari	supremecourt.gov.np/court/manangdc
Mustang District	Roma Kanta Gyawali	supremecourt.gov.np/court/mustangdc
Myagdi District	Madhavendra Raj Regmi	supremecourt.gov.np/court/myagdidc
Nawalpur District	Arjun Adhikari	supremecourt.gov.np/court/nawalpurdc
Parbat District	Balram Tripathi	supremecourt.gov.np/court/parbatdc
Syangja District	Basanta Raj Paudel	supremecourt.gov.np/court/syangjadc
Tanahun District	Basudev Paudel	supremecourt.gov.np/court/tanahundc
Lumbini Province
Arghakhanchi District	Basudev Neupane	supremecourt.gov.np/court/argakhanchidc
Banke District	Khadananda Tiwari	supremecourt.gov.np/court/bankedc
Bardiya District	Shankar Raj Baral	supremecourt.gov.np/court/bardiyadc
Dang District	Ritendra Thapa	supremecourt.gov.np/court/dangdc
Eastern Rukum District	Sanat Chandra Lawat	supremecourt.gov.np/court/rukumkotdc
Gulmi District	Radha Krishna Upreti	supremecourt.gov.np/court/gulmidc
Kapilvastu District	Bishnu Subedi	supremecourt.gov.np/court/kapilbastudc
Parasi District	Dhruva Kumar Shah	supremecourt.gov.np/court/nawalparasidc
Palpa District	Khadak Bahadur K.C.	supremecourt.gov.np/court/palpadc
Pyuthan District	Shyam Lal Ghimire	supremecourt.gov.np/court/pyuthandc
Rolpa District	Dilip Raj Panta	supremecourt.gov.np/court/rolpadc
Rupandehi District	Dhan SIngh Mahara	supremecourt.gov.np/court/rupandehidc
Karnali Province
Dailekh District	Danda Pandi Lamichhane	supremecourt.gov.np/court/dailekhdc
Dolpa District	Tekraj Joshi	supremecourt.gov.np/court/dolpadc
Humla District		supremecourt.gov.np/court/humladc
Jajarkot District	Yagya Prasad Acharya	supremecourt.gov.np/court/Jajarkotdc
Jumla District	Shiva Prasad Khanal	supremecourt.gov.np/court/jumladc
Kalikot District	Madhav Prasad Subedi	supremecourt.gov.np/court/kalikotdc
Mugu District	Punya Prasad Sapkota	supremecourt.gov.np/court/mugudc
Salyan District	Kul Prasad Pandey	supremecourt.gov.np/court/salyandc
Surkhet District	Rajendra Kumar Acharya	supremecourt.gov.np/court/surkhetdc
Western Rukum District	Bidhya Raj Paudel	supremecourt.gov.np/court/rukumdc
Sudurpashchim Province
Achham District	Nabin Kumar Joshi	supremecourt.gov.np/court/achhamdc
Baitadi District	Ishwari Prasad Bhandari	supremecourt.gov.np/court/baitadidc
Bajhang District	Bishnu Prasad Awasthi	supremecourt.gov.np/court/bajhangdc
Bajura District	Madhav Prasad Ghimire	supremecourt.gov.np/court/bajuradc
Dadeldhura District	Hari Prasad Sharma Upadhyaya	supremecourt.gov.np/court/dadeldhuradc
Darchula District	Lok Jang Shah	supremecourt.gov.np/court/darchuladc
Doti District	Bidur Kafle	supremecourt.gov.np/court/dotidc
Kailali District	Jayananda Paneru	supremecourt.gov.np/court/kailalidc
Kanchanpur District	Bharat Lamsal	supremecourt.gov.np/court/kanchanpurdc
