= Nagarjun, Nepal =

Nagarjun, Baitadi नागार्जुन
- Village development committee
- Location in Nepal
- Country: Nepal
- Zone: Mahakali Zone
- District: Baitadi District

Area
  - Total: 11.9 km^{2} (4.6 sq mi)

Population (2011)
  - Total: 1,961
  - Density: 165/km^{2} (430/sq mi)
  - Religions: Hindu
- Time zone: UTC+5:45 (Nepal Time)

Nagarjun is a village development committee in Baitadi District in the Mahakali Zone of Far-Western Nepal. At the time of the 2011 Nepal census it had a population of 1,961 and had 412 houses in the village.
