= Mahadevsthan, Baitadi =

Coordinates: 29°40′N 80°42′E

Mahadevsthan महादेवस्थान
- Village development committee
- Interactive map of Mahadevsthan
- Country: Nepal
- Zone: Mahakali Zone
- District: Baitadi District

Population (1991)
  - Total: 3,207
  - Religions: Hindu
- Time zone: UTC+5:45 (Nepal Time)

Mahadevsthan was a village development committee in Baitadi District in the Mahakali Zone of western Nepal further merged into Purchaudi Municipality. At the time of the 1991 Nepal census it had a population of 3,291 and had 599 houses in the town.
