= Gokuleshwar, Baitadi =

Coordinates: 29°40′N 80°34′E

Gokuleshwar गोकुलेश्वर
- City
- Interactive map of Gokuleshwar
- Country: Nepal
- Zone: Mahakali Zone
- District: Baitadi District

Population (1991)
  - Total: 3,444
  - Religions: Hindu
- Time zone: UTC+5:45 (Nepal Time)

VDC Map Baitadi District

Gokuleshwar is a Village Development Committee in Baitadi District in the Mahakali Zone of western Nepal. At the time of the 1991 Nepal census it had a population of 3,444 and had 601 houses in the town.
