= Kuwakot, Baitadi =

Coordinates: 29°36′N 80°45′E

Kuwakot कुवाकोट Kuwakot
- local town
- Interactive map of Kuwakot
- Country: Nepal
- Zone: Mahakali Zone
- District: Baitadi District

Population (1991)
  - Total: 3,804
  - Religions: Hindu
- Time zone: UTC+5:45 (Nepal Time)

Kuwakot is a Village Development Committee in Baitadi District in the Mahakali Zone of western Nepal. At the time of the 1991 Nepal census it had a population of 3804 and had 644 houses in the town.
