= Durgasthan =

Durgasthan दुर्गास्थान
- Village development committee
- Location in Nepal
- Coordinates: 29.48°N 80.45°E
- Country: Nepal
- Zone: Mahakali Zone
- District: Baitadi District
- Elevation: 1,879 m (6,165 ft)

Population (2011)
  - Total: 3,995
  - Religions: Hindu
- Time zone: UTC+5:45 (Nepal Time)
- VDC Code: 74018

Durgasthan is a village development committee in Baitadi District in the Mahakali Zone of western Nepal. At the time of the 2011 Nepal census it had a population of 3995 and had 726 houses in the town. It had a male population of 1784 and a female population of 2211.
