= Raikawar Bichawa =

Raikawar Bichawa रैकवार बिचवा
- Village development committee
- Location in Nepal
- Coordinates: 28.77°N 80.49°E
- Country: Nepal
- Province: Sudurpashchim Province
- District: Kanchanpur District

Population (1991)
  - Total: 9,936
- Time zone: UTC+5:45 (Nepal Time)

Raikawar Bichawa is a village development committee in Kanchanpur District in the Mahakali Zone of south-western Nepal. At the time of the 1991 Nepal census it had a population of 9936 people living in 1391 individual households. There Are 9 Ward in Raikwar Bichawa VDC.

It located near Dhangadhi, Kailali which is segregated by Mohana River. Raikwar Bichawa surrounded by Mohana River from east, Krishnapur Municipality from West Baisi Bichawa from South and Mohana River and Krishnapur Municipality from North Side.

Raikwar Bichawa is a part of Election Area No 4 of Constitution Assembly. Currently NP Saud from Nepali Congress Elected from here.

Villages of Raikwar Bichawa are as follows:

- Rajghat
- Bichawa
- Shantipur
- Kaluwapur
- Piparia
- Majgain
- Ghodaghat
- Chapartala
- Pachadhakki
