= Gwallek =

Gwallek ग्वाल्लेक
- Village development committee
- Location in Nepal
- Coordinates: 29.51°N 80.43°E
- Country: Nepal
- Zone: Mahakali Zone
- District: Baitadi District

Population (1991)
  - Total: 2,971
  - Religions: Hindu
- Time zone: UTC+5:45 (Nepal Time)

Gwallek is a village development committee in Baitadi District in the Mahakali Zone of western Nepal. At the time of the 1991 Nepal census it had a population of 2,971 and had 549 houses in the village.

== Significance ==
Gwallek is home to the Gwallek Kedar sacred forest, which enshrouds the Gwallek Kedar mountain and houses the shrine of the deity Kedar, also known as Mahadev. Gwallek Kedar is considered the most important of the four 'Kedar' abodes found in this region straddling the Indo-Nepal border, the other three being Raula Kedar (also in district Baitadi, Nepal), Thagel Kedar (in district Pithoragarh, India), and Dhaj kedar (also in district Pithoragarh, India). A detailed report on the cultural significance of the Gwallek Kedar sacred forest is available online from a study conducted by ICIMOD in 2016.
