= Sunsari District court =

District court in Sunsari, Nepal

- सुनसरी जिल्ला अदालत
- Interactive map of Sunsari District court
- 26.6083473°N 87.1562231°E
- Jurisdiction: Sunsari District
- Location: Inaruwa, Sunsari District
- Coordinates: 26.6083473°N 87.1562231°E
- Composition method: Chief Justice of Nepal on recommendations of Judicial council
- Authorised by: Government of Nepal
- Language: Nepali
- Website: supremecourt.gov.np/court/sunsaridc

Sunsari District court lies at Sunsari District, Nepal. It was established to inspect, supervise and issue necessary instructions to its subordinate judicial institutions under Clause 148, 149, 150 and 151 of Constitution of Nepal, 2015.

== Appointment ==
The Chief Justice of Nepal appoints judges of the District court on the recommendation of the Judicial Council.

== Judges ==
S.N.	Designation	Name
1	Honourable Judge	Prakash Raut
2	Honourable Judge	Hari Krishna Shrestha
3	Honourable Judge	Purushottam Nepal
4	Honourable Judge	Chandramani Chapagain
5	Honourable Judge	Durga Basyal
6	Honourable Judge	Indra Kumar Khadka
7	Honourable Judge	Devi kumari Chaudhary

== See also ==
District Courts of Nepal
