= Barakot =

Barakot बाराकोट
- Ward
- Location in Nepal
- Coordinates: 29°33′07″N 80°22′20″E
- Country: Nepal
- Province: Sudurpashchim Province
- District: Baitadi District
- Municipality: Dasharathchanda

Population (1991)
  - Total: 2,389
  - Religions: Hindu
- Time zone: UTC+5:45 (Nepal Time)

Barakot is a ward (ward number 10) in Dasharathchanda municipality, in Baitadi District in Sudurpashchim Province of western Nepal. Earlier it was a village development committee (VDC). At the time of the 1991 Nepal census it had a population of 2,389 and had 462 houses in the village.

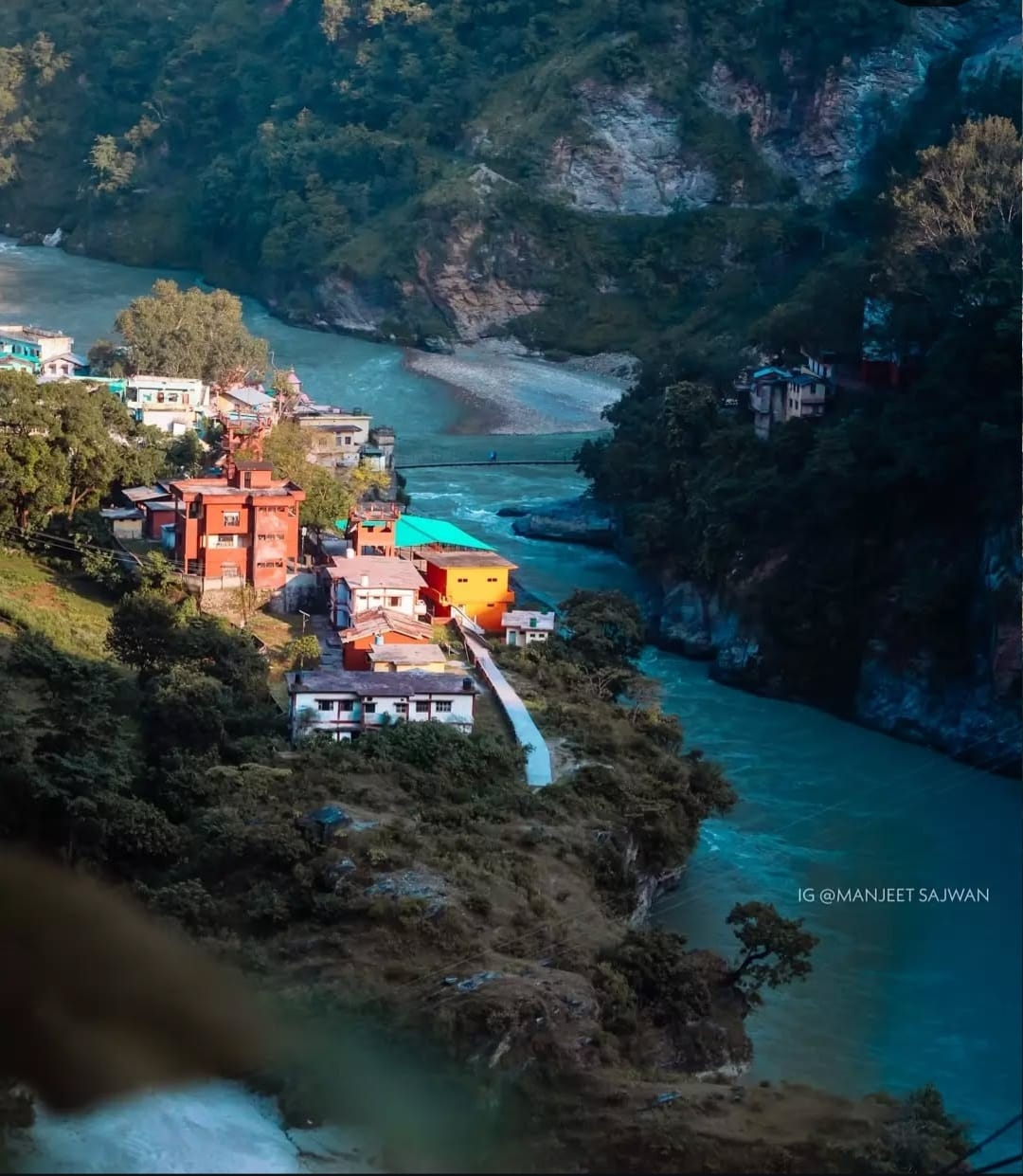
Indo-Nepal border in Barakot village

The ward consist of villages Harsau, Guinada, Salaani, Chauda, Jhaka, Barakot, and Bhatala with Bhatala being the largest village with over 50 households. Majority of the dwellers are Hindu Rajputs (Bisht), known as Hadasai Bisht Dynasty, Egarya Bisht (11 son) family is well known in Pithoragarh district Uttarakhand and Baitadi/Dadeldhura/darchula district of Nepal . Other casts include Brahmins (Bhatt), Rajputs (Chand, Budal) and some deprived classes (Dalits—Damayee, Chunara etc.).

There is a temple in Barakot named Nagarjun Daneswar temple in Satpali in the bank side of river Mahakali.

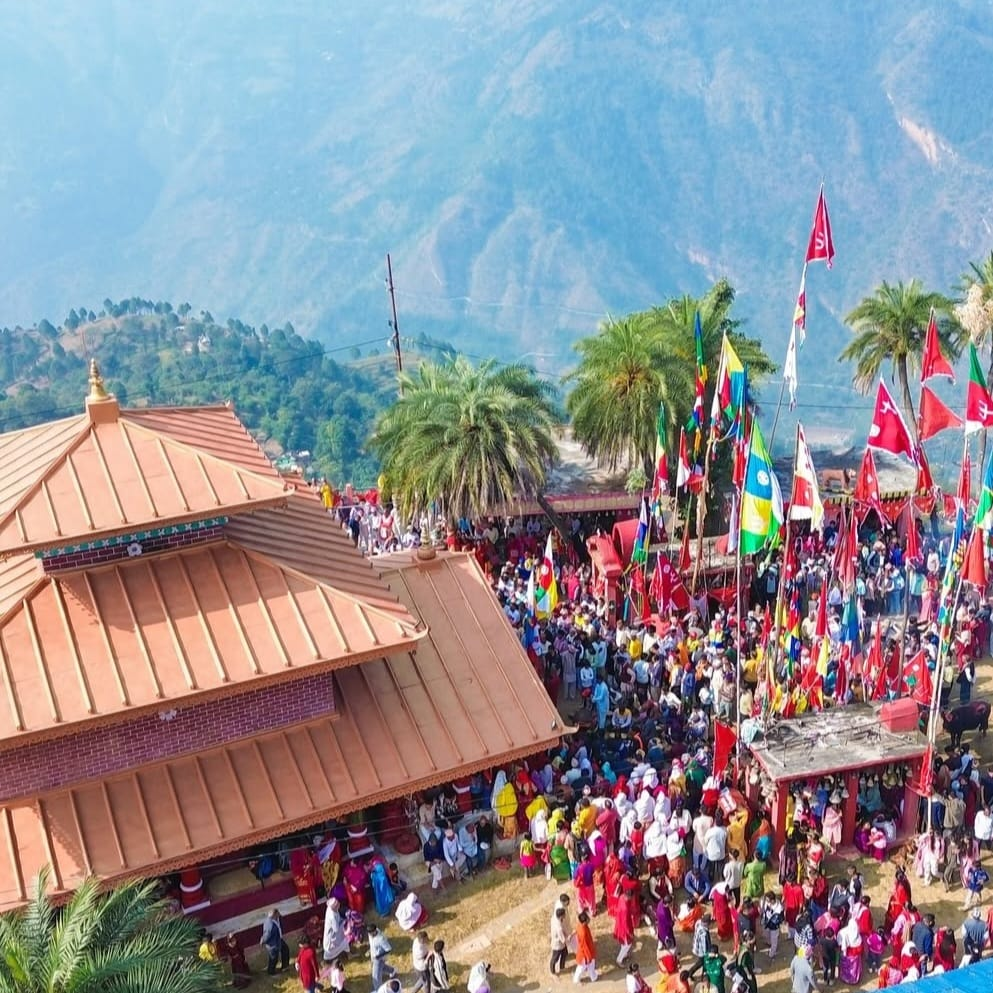
Tripura sundari temple

There is a 10+2 school—Shree Daneshwar Higher Secondary School at Barakot. Barakot also has a primary level school at Bhatala named Shree Gyaneshwar Primary School. Barakot is also one of the major cultural hotspots connecting the vibrant culture of both Uttarakhand[India] and Western Nepal. Being one of the Indian border connecting village(through Jhulaghat) of western Nepal, it has been a major trade route too. It's also the starting spot of puspalal(mid-hill) highway from the western side of the route.

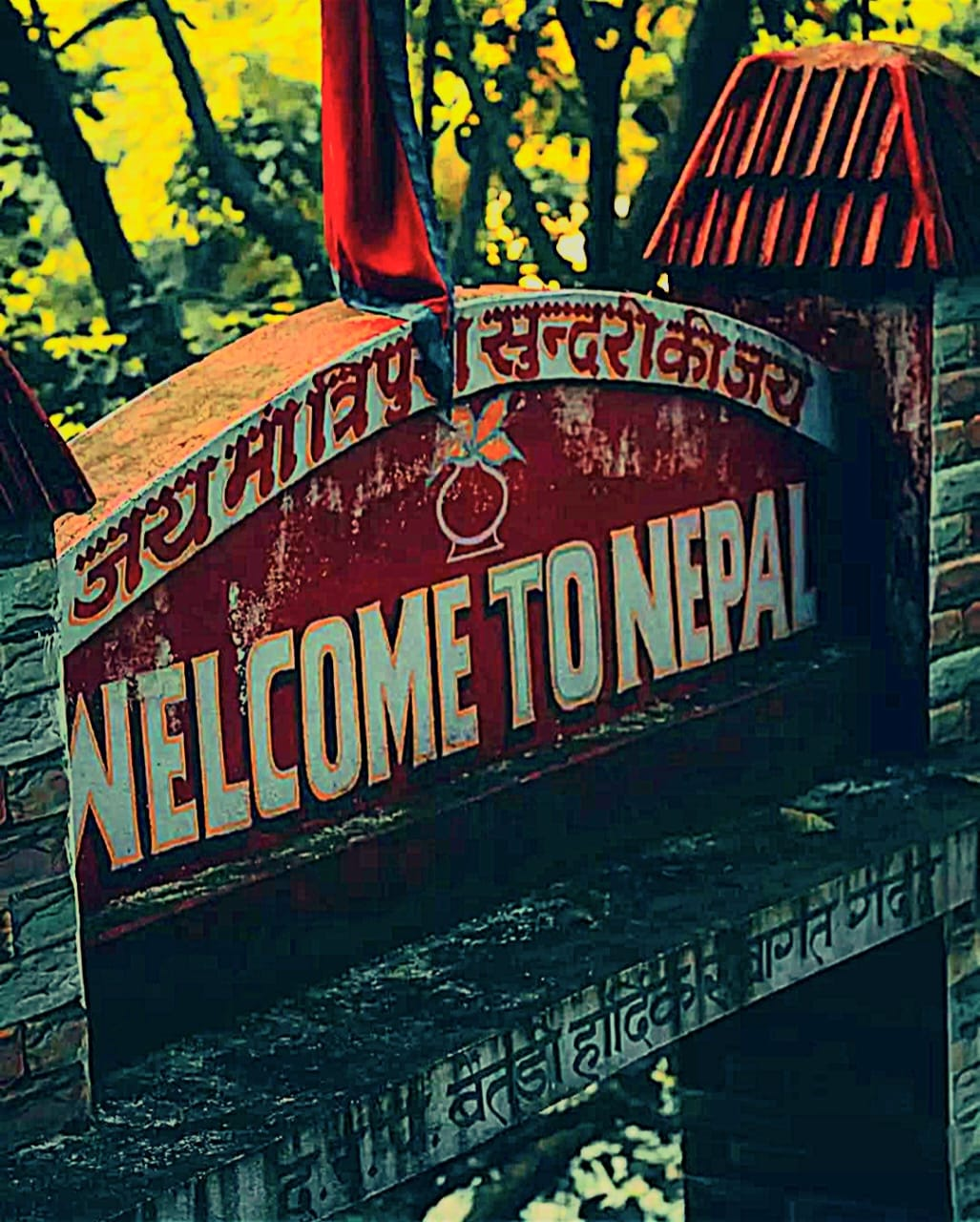
Jhulaghat bridge connecting Nepal and India
