= Dehimandau =

Dehimandau देहीमाडौं डेमान्डु
- Wards and electoral divisions of Nepal
- Location in Nepal
- Coordinates: 29.52°N 80.46°E
- Country: Nepal
- Province: Sudurpashchim
- District: Baitadi District
- Municipality: Dashrathchand

Area
  - Total: 12.87 km^{2} (4.97 sq mi)

Population (2021)
  - Total: 4,362
  - Density: 338.9/km^{2} (877.8/sq mi)
  - Religions: Hindu
- Time zone: UTC+5:45 (Nepal Time)
- Postal code: 10207

Dehimandau is a Ward in Dashrath Chand Municipality in the Baitadi District of Sudurpashchim Province of western Nepal. At the time of the 2021 Nepal census it had a population of 4,362 and has an area of 12.85 Sq. km. The current elected chairman of Ward No.2 of Dashrath Chand Municipality is Surya Bahadur Bohara.
