= Jhulaghat =

Human settlement in Pithoragarh district, Kumaon division, Uttarakhand, India

Jhulaghat (Kumaoni-Doteli:झुलाघाट) is a small suspension bridge over Kali river on Indo-Nepal border between Uttarakhand and Sudurpashchim. Uttarakhand is a state of India west of the Kali river while Sudurpashchim is a province of Nepal, east of Kali. Jhulaghat is an indo-aryan language word which literally means "Hanging pier". The landmark is known as Jhulaghat after the suspension bridge. The suspension bridge is small in size so only pedestrian, cyclist and biker can cross the border through it. There has been a small town emerged both side of the bridge. The town emerged Indian side of the bridge is a part of Munakot Tehsil in Pithoragarh District of Uttarakhand and Nepalese side is a part of Dasharathchand Municipality.

== History ==
The Jhulaghat suspension bridge was originally constructed by British engineers in 1877 to span the Kali River and establish a direct pedestrian and pack‑animal route between India’s Pithoragarh district and western Nepal. Stretching approximately 100 metres, it long served as a vital crossing for traders, pilgrims and pensioners in the remote border region. Remarkably, the bridge operated continuously for 145 years until July 2022, when rotting wooden components necessitated its first full closure for maintenance. In September 2023, monsoon‑related damage to the decking and railings prompted a month‑long repair program funded by the district administration, underscoring the structure’s enduring importance and the challenges of preserving colonial‑era infrastructure in the Himalayas.

Historically, the border town also developed close cultural and socio-economic ties with the adjoining Baitadi district of Nepal. The Pujara community of the region has been involved in local cross-border trade and the management of regional pilgrimage arrangements. This includes the annual festival coordination at the nearby Maa Tripura Sundari Temple, where the temple's chief patron, Prakash Pujara, oversees the cross-border regulations and logistics for visiting devotees.

== Mahakali-Jhulaghat Custom Office ==
There is a custom station both side of the river in India and Nepal. Pithoragarh-Jhulaghat road connects the Jhulaghat to Pithoragarh which is 38 KM at distance from Jhulaghat. Naini Saini is the nearest airport which is 40 KM far by air and Kathgodam is the nearest railway station which is 310 KM at distance.

In Nepal side, There is a Feeder road F-50 at Jhulaghat, which is connected with Mahakali Highway at Satbanjh, at 37 kilometres (23 mi) of distance. jhulaghat is the end point of Mid-Hills Highway of Nepal which starts at Chiyo Bhanjyang. Chiyo Bhanjyang is a border point between Koshi Province (Nepal) and Sikkim (India). The Mid-Hill highway runs. 1776 KM through Mid hills of Nepal.
