= Gurukhola =

Gurukhola, Nepal गुरुखोला
- Village development committee
- Nickname: pali
- Location in Nepal
- Coordinates: 29.48°N 80.58°E
- Country: Nepal
- Zone: Mahakali Zone
- District: Baitadi District

Population (1991)
  - Total: 2,567
  - Religions: Hindu–––—
- Time zone: UTC+5:45 (Nepal Time)

Gurukhola is a village development committee (VDC) in Baitadi District in the Mahakali Zone of western Nepal. At the time of the 1991 Nepal census it had a population of 3,481 and had 600 houses in the town.

Villages which are a part of Gurukhola VDC include:

- Kande
- Pali
