= Basuling =

Basuling बासुलिङ
- Village development committee
- Location in Nepal
- Coordinates: 29.52°N 80.53°E
- Country: Nepal
- Province: Sudurpashchim Province
- District: Baitadi District

Population (1991)
  - Total: 2,642
  - Religions: Hindu
- Time zone: UTC+5:45 (Nepal Time)

Basuling is a village development committee in Baitadi District in the Sudurpashchim Province of western Nepal. At the time of the 1991 Nepal census it had a population of 2,642 and had 482 houses in the village.
