= Tripurasundari, Baitadi =

Tripurasundari त्रिपुरासुन्दरी
- Village development committee
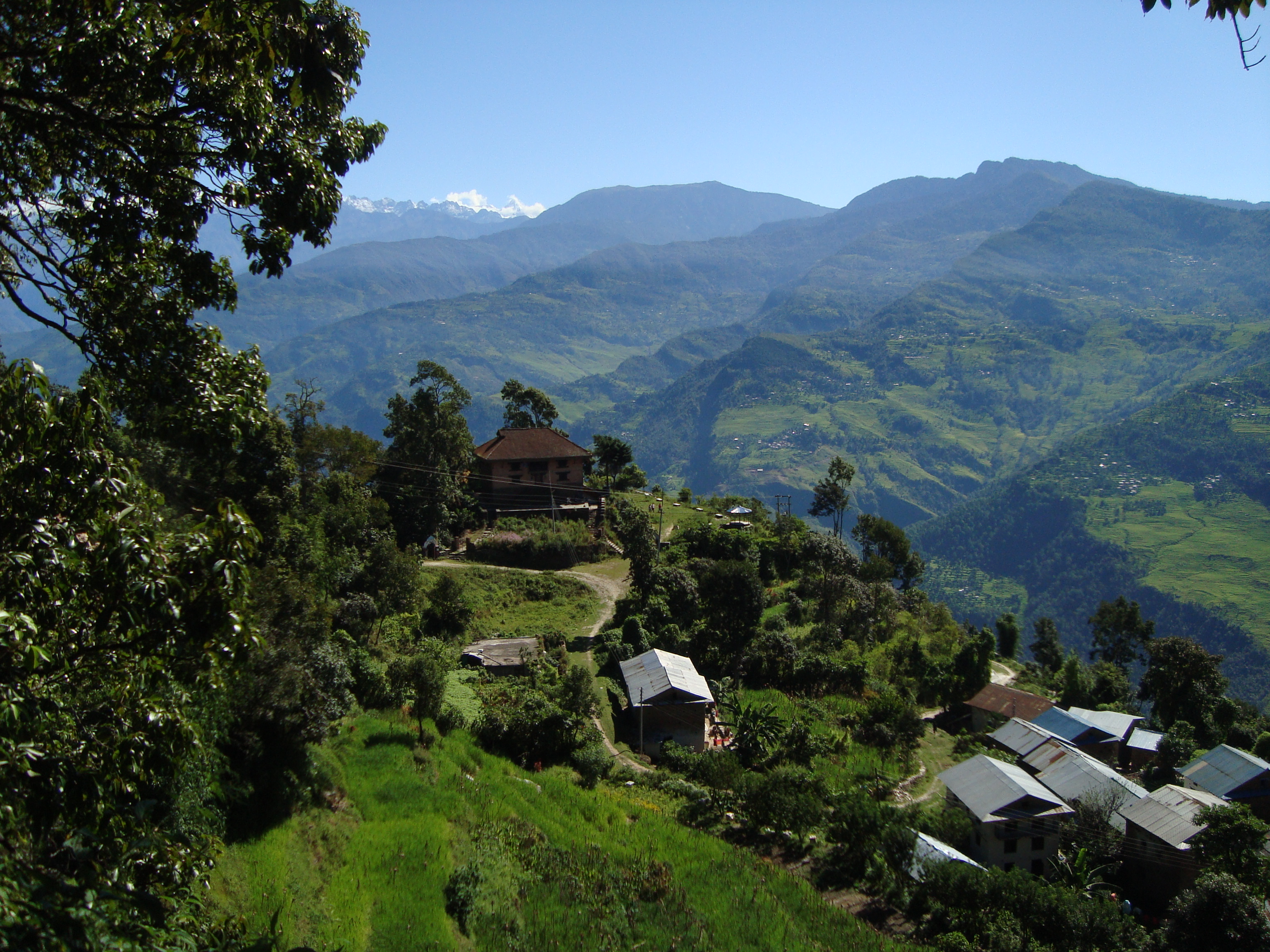
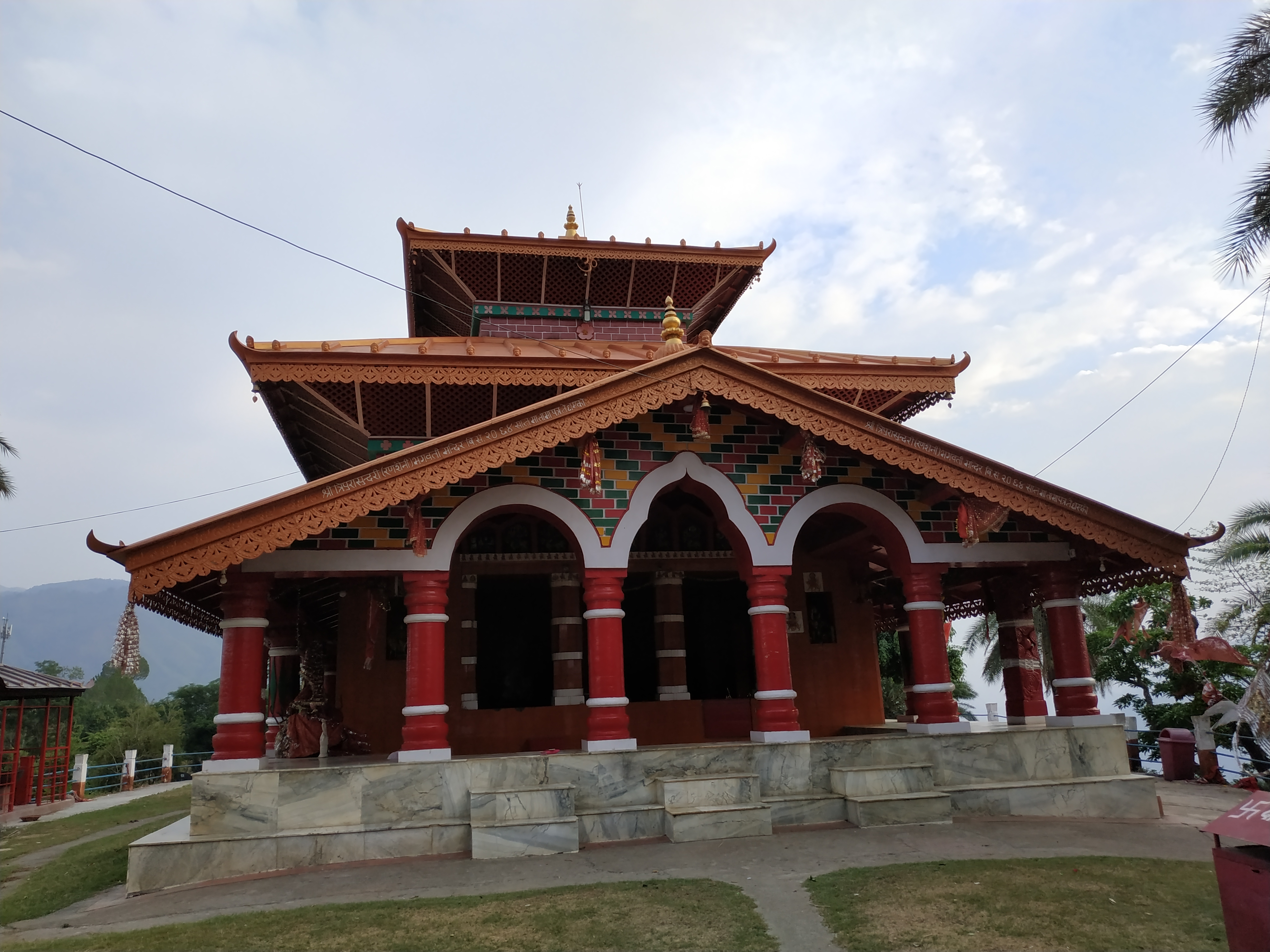
- Tripurasundari in 2009, Tripurasundari temple, Baitadi
- Interactive map of Tripurasundari
- Country: Nepal
- Province: Sudurpashchim Province
- District: Baitadi District

Population (1991)
  - Total: 2,487
  - Religions: Hindu
- Time zone: UTC+5:45 (Nepal Time)

Tripurasundari is a village development committee located in the Baitadi District within the Sudurpashchim Province of western Nepal. The VDC got its name from Tripura Sundari Temple. At the time of the 1991 Nepal census, the village had a population of 2,487 and had 491 houses in the village.
