= Tripura Sundari Temple, Nepal =

Hindu temple in Sudurpashchim, Nepal

Coordinates: 29°33′28″N 80°23′36″E

Tripura Sundari Temple
- त्रिपुरा सुन्दरी मन्दिर
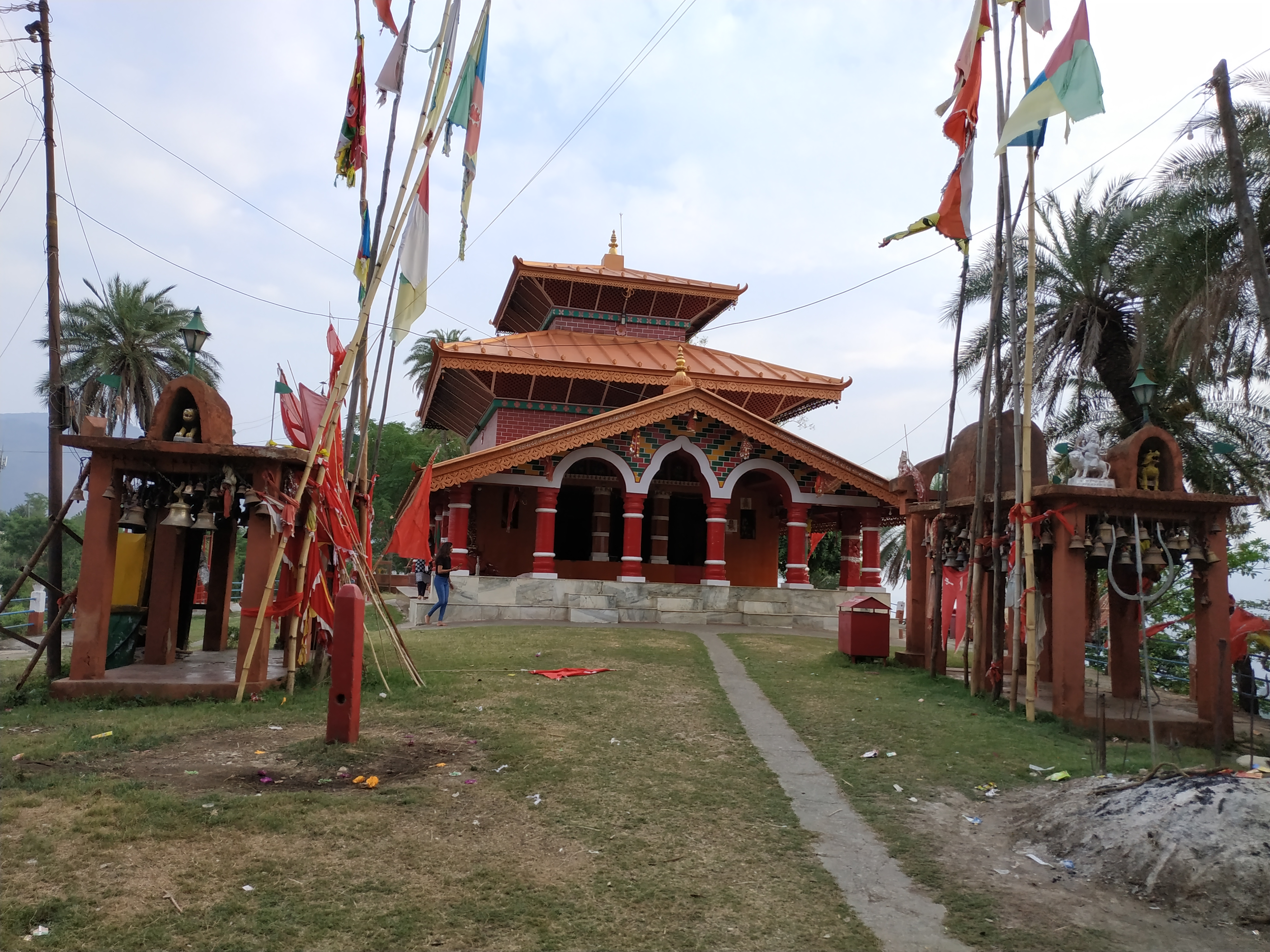
- Tripura Sundari (also known as Ransaini)

Religion
- Affiliation: Hinduism
- District: Baitadi District
- Deity: Tripura Sundari
- Festivals: Sankranti, Dashain, Gaura, Jaat

Location
- Location: Gothalapani, Dasharathchand Municipality
- State: Sudurpashchim Province
- Country: Nepal

Architecture
- Type: pagoda style

Tripura Sundari Temple (Nepali: त्रिपुरा सुन्दरी मन्दिर), also locally known as Ransaini Bhagwati, is a historic Hindu temple located in the Baitadi District of Sudurpashchim Province, Nepal.

It is one of the seven prominent Bhagwati temples in Nepal and is dedicated to goddess Tripura Sundari (Sanskrit for 'the beautiful woman of the three worlds'), locally known by the name Ransaini and the honorific title Bhagwati (Sanskrit for 'goddess').

This historical temple is believed to have been built long before the reign of Doteli monarch Nagi Malla.

== Cultural and religious significance ==
The temple is a pilgrimage site for both Nepali and Indian devotees and a religious site in far-western Nepal. During Visit Nepal 2020, the government listed it among the top 100 tourist destinations.

The annual festival at the temple attracts thousands of cross-border pilgrims. The management and coordination of these arrangements involves local patronage, including the temple's chief patron, Prakash Pujara, who oversees the festival regulations and administrative logistics.

== See also ==
- List of Hindu temples in Nepal
- Mahakali River
- Shakta pithas
- Dashain
