= Nwadeu =

Nwadeuo न्वादेऊ
- Village development committee
- Location in Nepal
- Coordinates: 29.65°N 80.74°E
- Country: Nepal
- Zone: Mahakali Zone
- District: Baitadi District

Population (1991)
  - Religions: Hindu
- Time zone: UTC+5:60 (Nepal Time)

Nwadeu is a village development committee in Baitadi District in the Mahakali Zone of western Nepal.
