= National Highway 04 (Nepal) =

Highway in Nepal

Birtamod-Bhadrapur Highway बिर्तामोड-भद्रपुर राजमार्ग
- राष्ट्रिय राजमार्ग ०४
- National Highway 04
- NH04 in red

Route information
- Maintained by MoPIT (Department of Roads)
- Length: 12.53 km (7.79 mi)
- Status: Active
- History: Black topped four lanes

Major junctions
- North end: Birtamod
- Sainikmod
- South end: Bhadrapur

Location
- Country: Nepal
- Provinces: Koshi Province
- District: Jhapa District

Highway system
- Roads in Nepal
← NH03	→ NH05

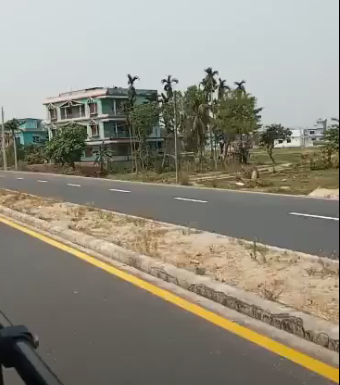
NH04 near Mechi Eye Hospital

NH04 or Birtamod-Bhadrapur road is a short National Highway of Nepal, located in Jhapa District of Koshi Province. The total length of the highway is just 12.53 kilometres (7.79 mi). The road is fully black topped four lane National Highway.

Highway NH04 was constructed as Feeder Road F001 / Feeder Road F1 with two lanes to provide connection between East West Highway at Birtamod and a bridge (Mechipul) across Mechi river at Chandragadhi (Bhadrapur Municipality). NH04 across the Mechipul connects with Indian Highway NH-327. The feeder road F01 upgraded to National Highway with four lanes in 2019–20.

== See also ==
- Roads in Nepal
