= Silanga =

Silanga सिलङ्गा
- Village development committee
- Location in Nepal
- Coordinates: 29.43°N 80.58°E
- Country: Nepal
- Zone: Mahakali Zone
- District: Baitadi District

Population (1991)
  - Total: 2,260
  - Religions: Hindu
- Time zone: UTC+5:45 (Nepal Time)

Silanga is a village development committee in Baitadi District in the Mahakali Zone of western Nepal. At the time of the 1991 Nepal census it had a population of 2,260 and had 400 houses in the village.
