= Basantapur, Baitadi =

Coordinates: 29°27′N 80°30′E

Basantapur वसन्तपुर
- Village
- Interactive map of Basantapur
- Country: Nepal
- Province: Sudurpashchim Province
- District: Baitadi District

Population (1991)
  - Total: 2,141
  - Religions: Hindu
- Time zone: UTC+5:45 (Nepal Time)

Basantapur is a Village Development Committee in Baitadi District in Sudurpashchim Province of western Nepal. At the time of the 1991 Nepal census it had a population of 2,141 and had 366 houses in the village.

Basantpur is a place which is almost 50 kilometres (31 mi) away from the Daimadu. Many of the people from this village are settled in metro cities of India and in the large cities of the Nepal. Many of the people are settled in Delhi; some of them are businessmen, and a number of youngsters have joined the army in Nepal. Many NGOs are working for the village. The village has a high school and has a water supply to almost every house. Many festivals like Gaura and Dashain are celebrated each year. The main earning of the people comes from agriculture. The village has many mills (ghatta in Nepal) for the grinding of wheat. Basantapur is not connected by public transport.
