= Bijayapur =

Bijayapur विजयपुर
- Village development committee
- Location in Nepal
- Coordinates: 29.57°N 80.62°E
- Country: Nepal
- Province: Sudurpashchim Province
- District: Baitadi District

Population (1991)
  - Total: 3,305
  - Religions: Hindu
- Time zone: UTC+5:45 (Nepal Time)

Bijayapur is a village development committee in Baitadi District in Sudurpashchim Province of western Nepal. At the time of the 1991 Nepal census it had a population of 3,305 and had 580 houses in the village.
