= Bhatana =

Bhatana भतना
- Village development committee
- Location in Nepal
- Coordinates: 29.62°N 80.76°E
- Country: Nepal
- Province: Sudurpashchim Province
- District: Baitadi District

Population (2001)
  - Total: 3,363
  - Religions: Hindu
- Time zone: UTC+5:45 (Nepal Time)

Bhatana is a village development committee in Baitadi District in Sudurpashchim Province of western Nepal. At the time of the 1991 Nepal census it had a population of 3,202 and had 571 houses in the village.
