= Bhumeshwar =

Bhumeshwar भुमेश्वर
- Village development committee
- Location in Nepal
- Coordinates: 29.49°N 80.54°E
- Country: Nepal
- Province: Sudurpashchim Province
- District: Baitadi District

Population (1991)
  - Total: 2,697
  - Religions: Hindu
- Time zone: UTC+5:45 (Nepal Time)

Bhumeshwar is a village development committee in Baitadi District in Sudurpashchim Province of western Nepal. At the time of the 1991 Nepal census it had a population of 2,697 and had 489 houses in the village.
