= National Highway 31 (Nepal) =

Highway in Nepal

Dolalghat-Chautara Highway दोलालघाट-चौतारा राजमार्ग
- राष्ट्रिय राजमार्ग ३१
- National Highway 31
- NH31 in red

Route information
- Maintained by MoPIT (Department of Roads)
- Length: 25.12 km (15.61 mi)

Major junctions
- North end: Chautara
- South end: Dolalghat

Location
- Country: Nepal
- Provinces: Bagmati Province
- Districts: Sindhupalchowk District

Highway system
- Roads in Nepal
← NH30	→ NH32

National Highway 31 (Dolalghat-Chautara) is a National Highway of Nepal, located in Sindhupalchowk District of Bagmati Province. The total length of the highway is 25.12 kilometres (15.61 mi).
