= Kotila, Baitadi =

Coordinates: 29°35′N 80°43′E

Kotila कोटिला
- Village development committee
- Interactive map of Kotila
- Country: Nepal
- Zone: Mahakali Zone
- District: Baitadi District

Population (1991)
  - Total: 2,713
  - Religions: Hindu
- Time zone: UTC+5:45 (Nepal Time)

Kotila was a village development committee in Baitadi District in the Mahakali Zone of western Nepal which was merged into Purchaudi Municipality. At the time of the 1991 Nepal census it had a population of 2,713 and had 472 houses in the town.
