= Chiwa Bhanjyang =

Mountain pass between Nepal and India

Chiyo Bhanjyang
- Location within Koshi Province Location within Nepal Location within South Asia

Highest point
- Elevation: 3,139 m (10,299 ft)
- Coordinates: 27°16′6″N 88°1′50″E

Geography
- Location: Pathibhara Yangwarak, Panchthar District, Province No. 1, Nepal; West Sikkim district, Sikkim, India

Chiyo Bhanjyang (Nepali: चियो भञ्ज्याङ) (also known as Chiwa Bhanjyang or Chiya Bhanjyang) is an international mountain pass located at Nepal-Sikkim (India) border. It is located at elevation of 3,139 metres (10,299 ft) above the sea level. The Mid-Hills Highway (Pushpalal Highway) starts from here and runs across the mid-hills in Nepal. Across the border, in Sikkim "Uttarey-Chiwa Bhanjyang road" starts and connects Gangtok at 170 km of distance.
