= Khalanga, Baitadi =

Khalanga, Baitadi Khalaṅgā, baitaḍī खलङ्गा, बैतडी
- Village development committee
- Location in Nepal
- Coordinates: 29°32′N 80°26′E
- Country: Nepal
- Province: Sudurpashchim Province
- District: Baitadi District

Area
  - Total: 2,322 km^{2} (897 sq mi)

Population (2011)
  - Total: 133,274
  - Density: 57.40/km^{2} (148.7/sq mi)
  - Religion: 100% Hinduism
- Time zone: UTC+5:45 (Nepal Time)

Khalanga or Baitadi Khalanga is a town and seat of Baitadi District in the Sudurpashchim Province of western Nepal. At the time of the 1991 Nepal census it had a population of 5,352 and had 1011 houses in the town.

== Religion ==
According to the 2021 census of Nepal
Hindu are majority religion with 100% of the population are Hindu
