= Baitadi District =

District in Sudurpashchim Province, Nepal

Coordinates: 29.5179°N 80.467°E

Baitadi District बैतडी
- District
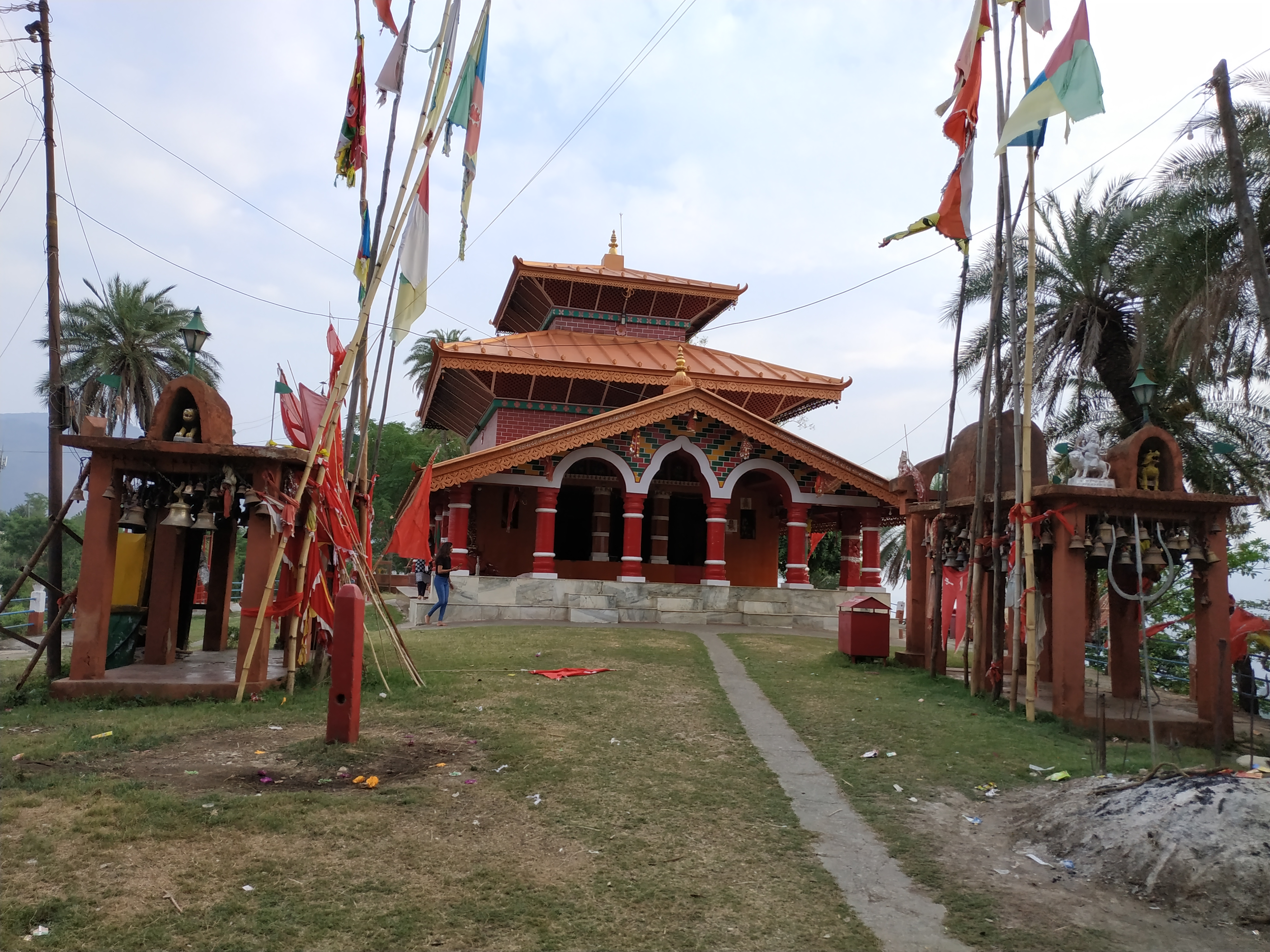
- Tripura Sundari Temple, Baitadi, Nepal

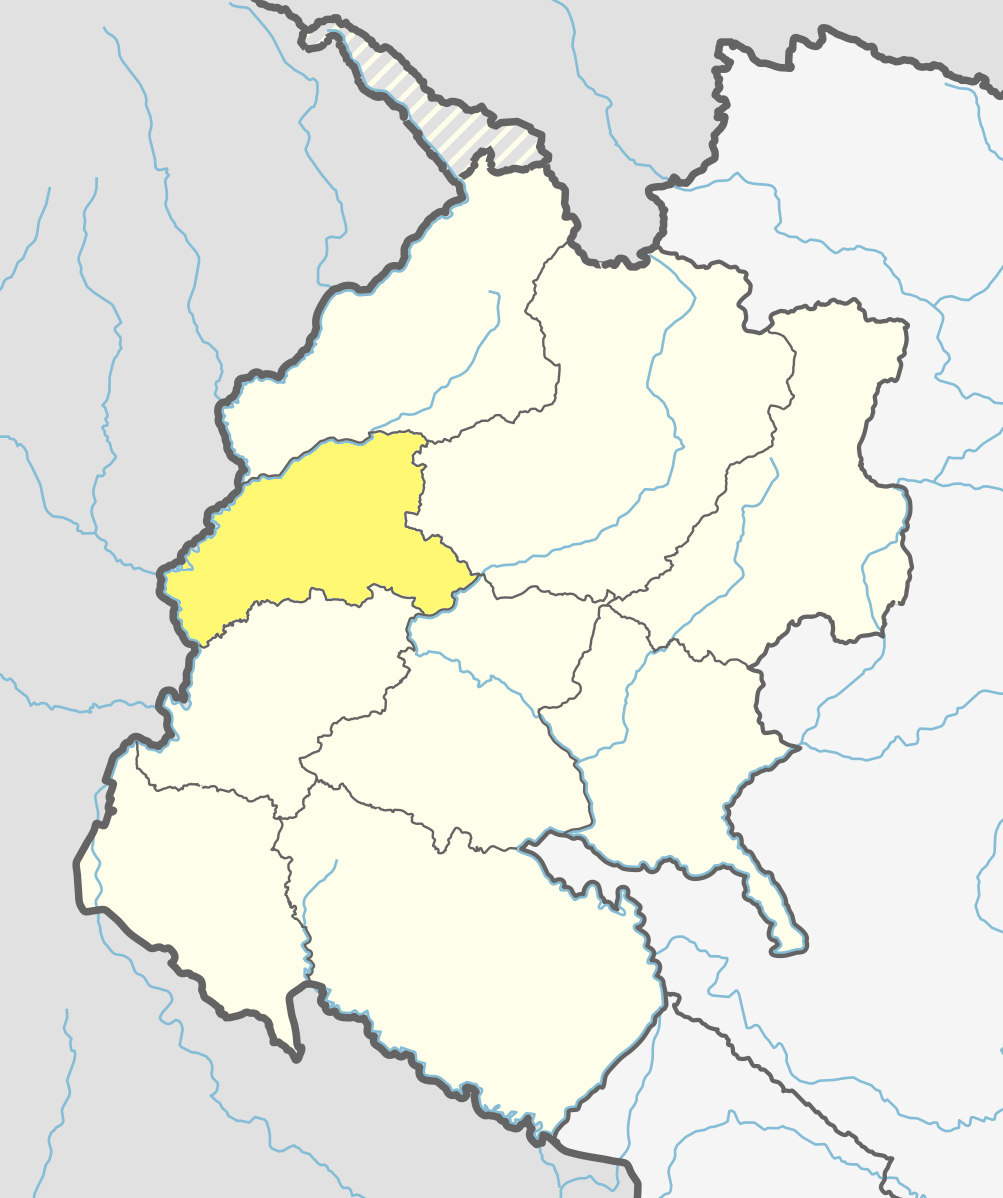
- Location of Baitadi District
- Country: Nepal
- Province: Sudurpashchim Province
- Established: pre 1962
- Admin HQ.: Dasharathchand

Government
  - Type: Coordination committee
  - Body: DCC, Baitadi

Area
  - Total: 1,519 km^{2} (586 sq mi)

Population (2011)
  - Total: 250,899
  - Density: 165.2/km^{2} (427.8/sq mi)
- Time zone: UTC+05:45 (NPT)
- Telephone Code: 095
- Main Language(s): Baitadeli

Baitadi District (Nepali: बैतडी जिल्ला), historical name “Bairath” (बैराथ), a part of Sudurpashchim Province, is one of the seventy-seven districts of Nepal. It is a Hill district. Baitadi, with Dasharathchand as its headquarters, covers an area of 1,519 km^{2} (586 sq mi) and has a population of 250,898 according to the census (2011). In the past, the Baitadi district had 56 village development councils (VDCs) and two municipalities. By federal policy, there are currently 10 local units (with their own local Governance, but not as sovereign); four municipalities (Dashrath Chand, Patan, Melauli and Purchudi) and six rural municipalities (Surnaya, Sigas, Shivnath, Pancheshwar, Dogada-Kedar and Dilasaini). Baitadi falls into the farthest western region of Nepal; it touches Jhulaghat, India, Nepal's neighboring country, on its border. It is very rich in culture and tradition particularly Jagar tradition. Several revered and powerful deities and gods are present here, some of them are-

- Tripurasundari
- Niglasaini
- Devtaal
- Nagarjun (also called Daneshwar)
- Jagannath
- Ganmeshwar (also called Gadwaling)
- Melauli mata
- Shivkedar
- Shivanath

== History ==
Baitadi was part of the Kumaon Kingdom until the Gorkha invasion of Kumaon in 1791. The region was once a part of the Great Katyuri's kingdom. After the fall of that kingdom, around the 10th century, Khasa King Ashok Challa of Sapadalaksh (Karnali Zone or Dullu, Dailekh) seized most of that part of the Katyuri Kingdom, including Baitadi. During the Khas kingdom, Baitadi was one of three major centres. The others were Kamadesh (Kali Kumaun) and Kedarbhumi (Garhwal) in the Central Himalayas. According to the historical folk-tales in Baitadi, it was one of the Chand Kings who fought with the Khas king and established a sovereign state for the Chand dynasty in Baitadi. These tales resembled a historical story of the establishment of Kumaun Kingdom. One of the view of the historians of Uttarakhand, a state in India, Nepal's neighboring country, suggest that it was Thohar Chand who was responsible for establishing the Chand dynasty in Kali-Kumaun. He then changed his name to Abhai Chand after he became a King. Badri Dutt Pandey, in a history of Kumaun, quoted the following story about the history of Kumaun.

Gyan Chand (1376 A.D) was the first ruler of the Chand Dynasty of Champawat who was part of the third generation from Thohar Chand or Abhai Chand. Gyan Chand's grandfather, Trilok Chand, and his father, Kalyan Chand, were rulers of Baitadi, according to the folk tales.

The kings who ruled in Baitadi were:

- Thohar- Ahai Chand (1261–1281 AD)
- Trilok Chand
- Kalyan Chand
- Gyan Chand (1376 AD)
- Karm Chand
- Bharati Chand
- Ratan Chand
- Megh Chand (1503 AD)
- Kirti Chand
- Kalyan Chand
- Rudra Chand (1580 AD)
- Laxman Chand
- Dilip Chand
- Vijay Chand
- Trimal Chand
- Baj Bhadur Chand
- Udyot Chand
- Gyan Chand- II (1706 AD)
- Jagat Chand
- Debi Chand
- Kalyan Chand- II (1731AD)
- Deep Chand

Gorkha kingdom annexed Kumaon in 1791 and merged Baitadi in Doti District until 1885. Baitadi and Dadeldhura had same "Bada-Hakim" (District Administrators). As such, those two districts used to be referred to as the Baitadi-Dadeldhura district until 1956. The "Baitadi-Dadeldhura" district was renamed Mahakali District after 1956. In 1956, four county (Thums) of Baitadi separated and made a sub-district of Mahakali district. From 1956 to 1962, "Mahakali district" had three sub-districts: Dadeldhura, Baitadi and Chamba.

In 1962, Darchula (Chamba) separated from Baitadi District.

District in different time
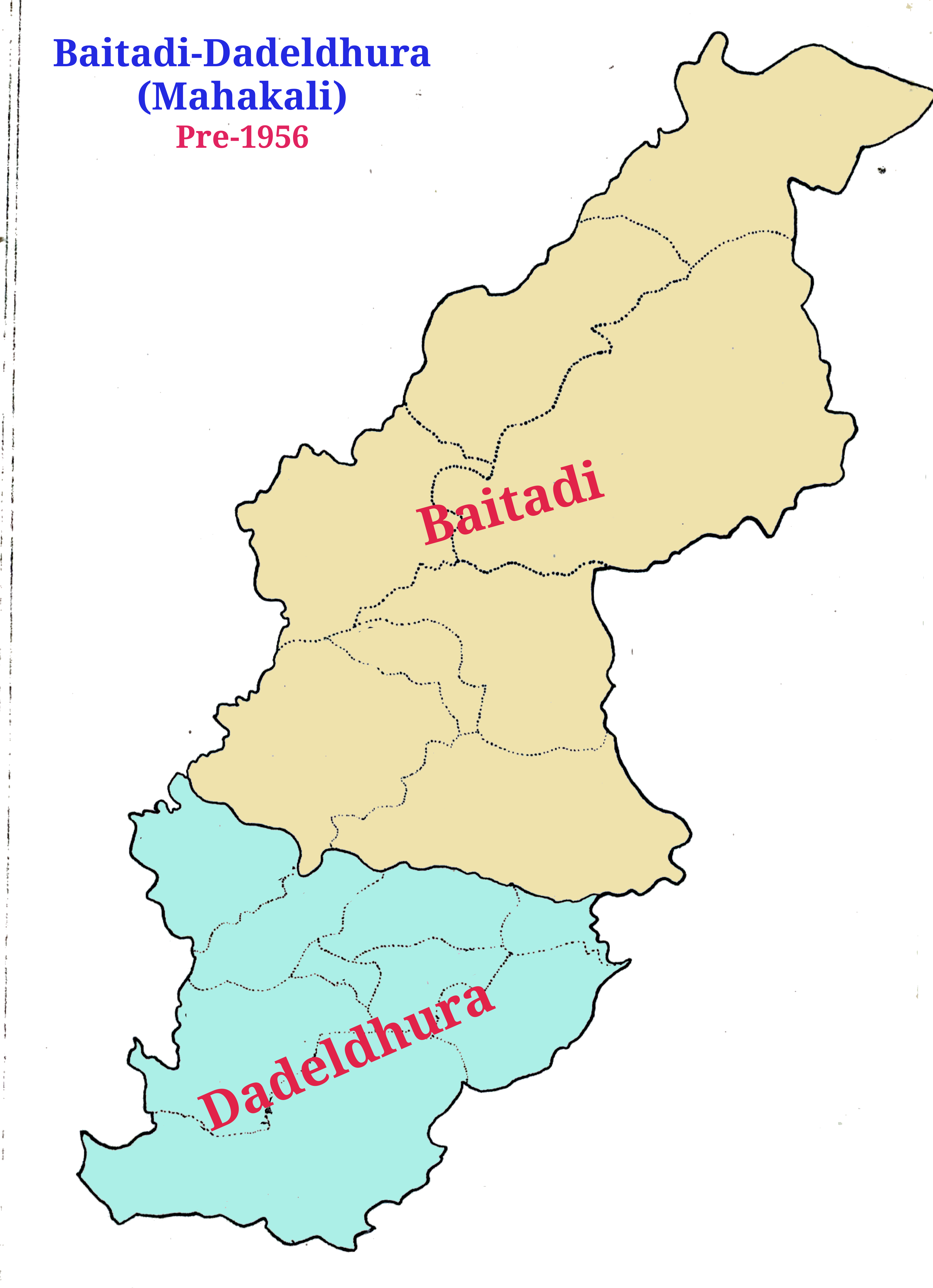
Darchula as a part of Baitadi sub-district of Mahakali (Baitadi-Dadeldhura) district (before 1956)

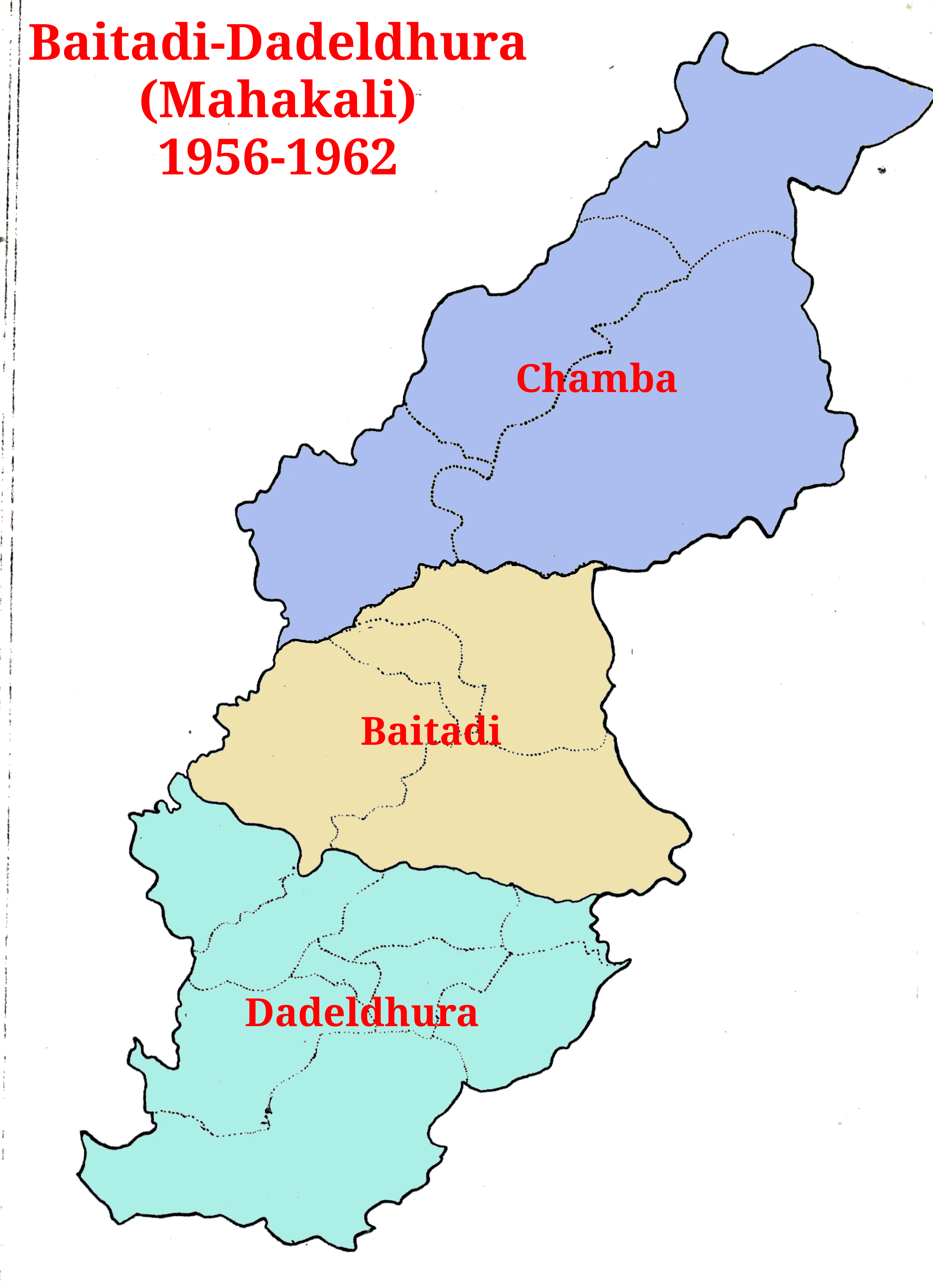
Darchula (Chamba), a sub-district of Mahakali district (1956–1962)

== Demographics ==
Historical population
Census year	Pop.	±% p.a.
1981	179,136	—
1991	200,716	+1.14%
2001	234,418	+1.56%
2011	250,898	+0.68%
2021	244,400	−0.26%
Source: Citypopulation

At the time of the 2021 Nepal census, Baitadi District had a population of 242,157. 9.56% of the population is under 5 years of age. It has a literacy rate of 76.79% and a sex ratio of 1127 females per 1000 males. 119,736 (49.45%) lived in municipalities.

Castes/ethnic groups in Baitadi district (2021)
1. Chhetri (53.0%)
2. Bahun (16.8%)
3. Kami (14.5%)
4. Thakuri (6.84%)
5. Sarki (4.31%)
6. Damai (2.89%)
7. Dasnami (1.42%)
8. Others (0.26%)

Khas people make up nearly the entire population. Chhetris make up 53% of the population, while Khas Dalits make up 22% of the population.

Languages of Baitadi district (2021)
1. Nepali (59.5%)
2. Baitadeli (39.4%)
3. Others (1.15%)

At the time of the 2021 census, 59.50% of the population spoke Nepali and 39.35% Baitadeli as their first language. In 2011, 0.9% of the population spoke Nepali as their first language.

Hinduism is the predominant religion, practiced by 99.95% of the population.

== Geography and climate ==
Climate Zone	Elevation range	% of area
Upper Tropical	300 to 1,000 meters 1,000 to 3,300 ft.	13.1%
Subtropical	1,000 to 2,000 meters 3,300 to 6,600 ft.	71.2%
Temperate	2,000 to 3,000 meters 6,400 to 9,800 ft.	15.7%

== Administration ==
The district is administered by District Coordination Committee (Legislative), District Administration Office (Executive) and District Court (Judicial) as follows:

Administration	Name of units	Head	Website
Legislative	District Coordination Committee		ddcbaitadi.gov.np
Executive	District Administration Office	Mr. Anand Paudel	daobaitadi.moha.gov.np
Judicial	District Court	Mr. Ishwari Prasad Bhandari	supremecourt.gov.np/court/baitadidc

== Administrative divisions ==
The district consists of ten municipalities, out of which four are urban municipalities and three are rural municipalities. These are as follows:

- Dasharathchand Municipality
- Patan Municipality
- Melauli Municipality
- Purchaudi Municipality
- Sunarya Rural Municipality
- Sigas Rural Municipality
- Shivanath Rural Municipality
- Pancheshwor Rural Municipality
- Dogdakedar Rural Municipality
- Dilasaini Rural Municipality

=== Former Village Development Committees ===
Prior to the restructuring of the district, Baitadi District consisted of the following municipalities and Village development committees:

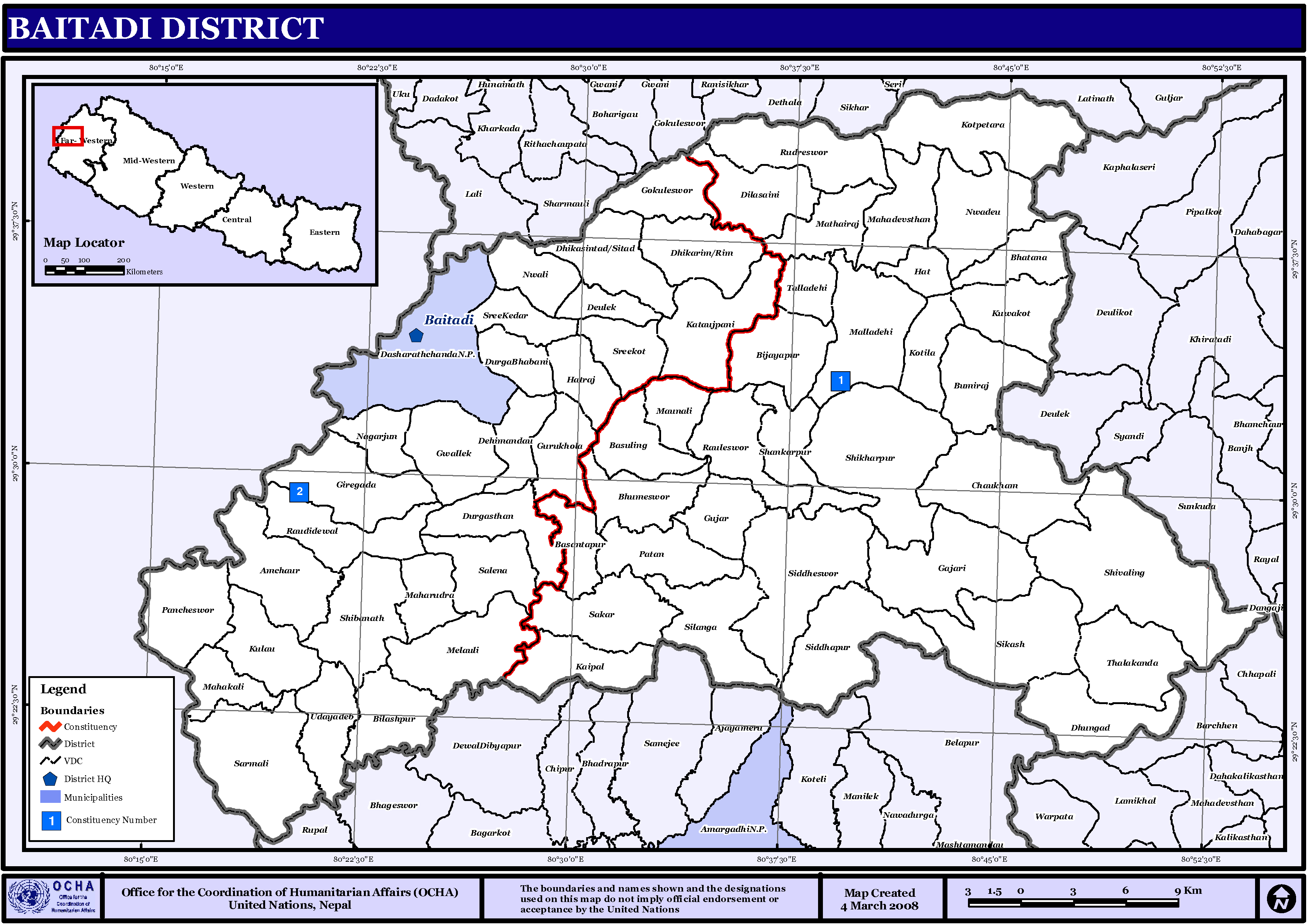
Map of the VDC/s and Municipalities in Baitadi District

- SALENA
- Amchoura
- FYAULI
- Barakot
- khadeni
- Basantapur
- Basuling
- Bhatana
- Bhumeshwar
- Bijayapur
- Bishalpur
- Bumiraj
- Nwadeu
- Chaukham
- Sibnath
- Dehimandau
- Deulek
- Dhungad
- Dilasaini
- Durga Bhabani
- Durgasthan
- Dungara
- Gurukhola
- Gajari
- Giregada
- Gokuleshwar
- Gwallek
- Hat
- Hatairaj
- Jagannath
- Kailpal
- Kataujpani
- Kotila
- Kotpetara
- Kulau
- Kuwakot
- Mahadevsthan
- Mahakali
- Maharudra
- Malladehi
- Nagarjun
- Siddheshwar
- Sharmali
- Raudidewal
- Rauleshwar
- Giregada
- Srikedar
- Srikot
- Sankarpur
- Shikarpur
- Rim

== Sports ==
Volleyball and cricket are very popular in Baitadi. Baitadi has won many regional competitions and is home to many eminent national players for the Nepal national cricket team.

== Communication ==
Saugaat FM 103.6 MHz, Samsher, FM 106.6 MHz and Ninglashaini FM 94.0 MHz are the radio stations of the Baitadi District. Radio Pura Sanchar 97.0 MHz and Radio melauli 101.2MHz are also in the Baitadi District.

== Agriculture ==
Corn and wheat are the main crops of this region, but millet, maize and rice are also grown for home use. Commercial farming is not popular in this region. Some fruits are grown and exported to the nearby headquarters Bhimdatta and Dhangadhi—particularly Mandarins, Oranges, Lemons, and sometimes Emblica. The latter is found both domesticated and growing wild in the forests. Sapindus or Soapnut is also grown and used for washing clothes as well a bodies. Sapindus is also exported to nearby towns.

== Sites of interest ==
The Gwallek Kedar sacred forest, situated wholly in Baitadi district, is considered the most important 'Kedar' - abode of Mahadev - of the four Kedars that lie along the Indo-Nepal border between western Nepal and Uttarakhand. As such, it is an important regional pilgrimage site.

== Sources ==
- "Districts of Nepal". Statoids.
- A New History Of Uttarakhand : Dr. Y. S. Kathoch
- History of Doti Kingdom : Bhattarai
- Spell Change amchour from amchoura by uttam chand
