= Mahakali Zone =

Mahakali province

Coordinates: 29°30′N 80°30′E

Mahakali महाकाली अञ्चल
- Zone
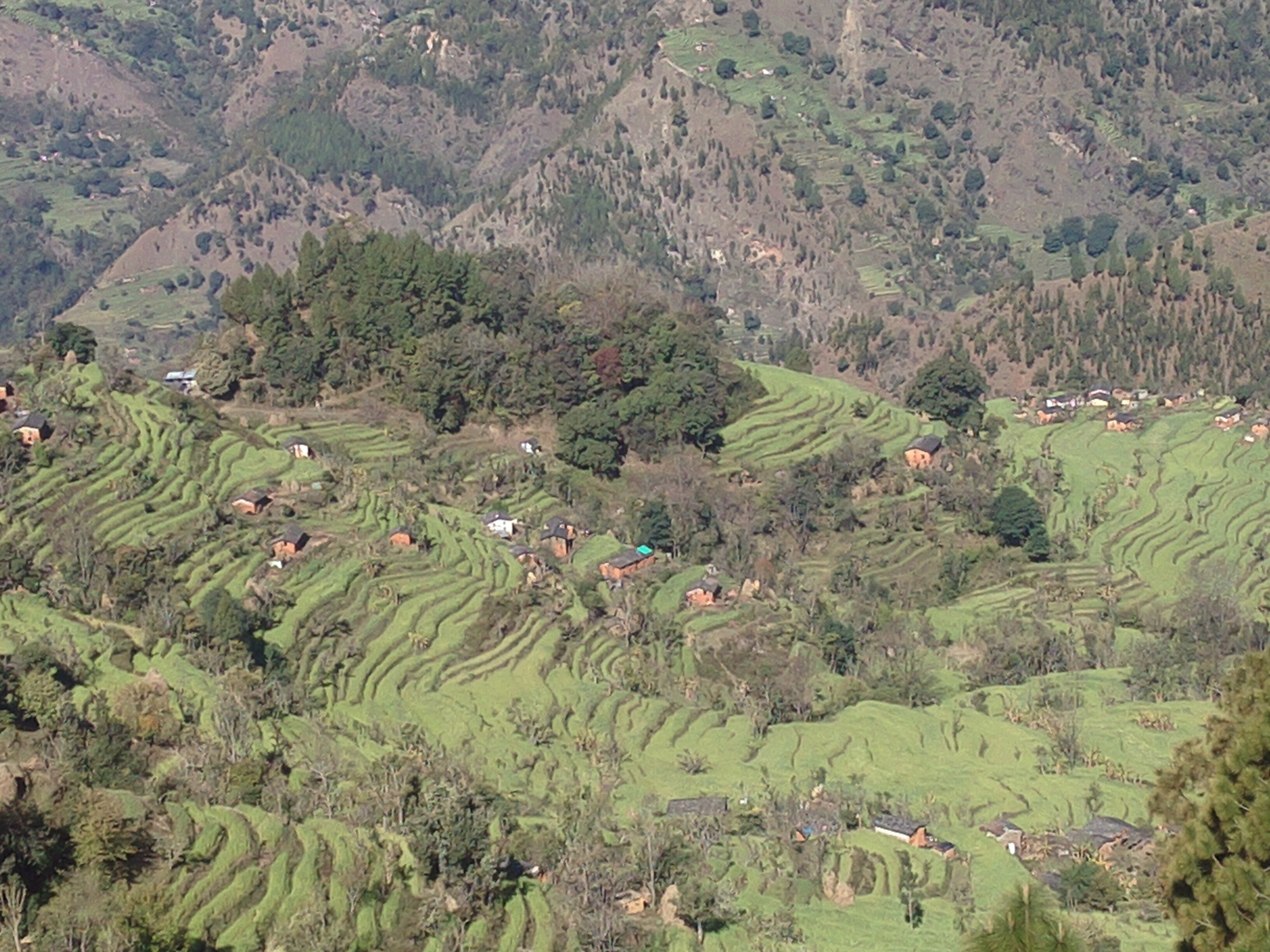
- Landscape near Kharkada, Darchula

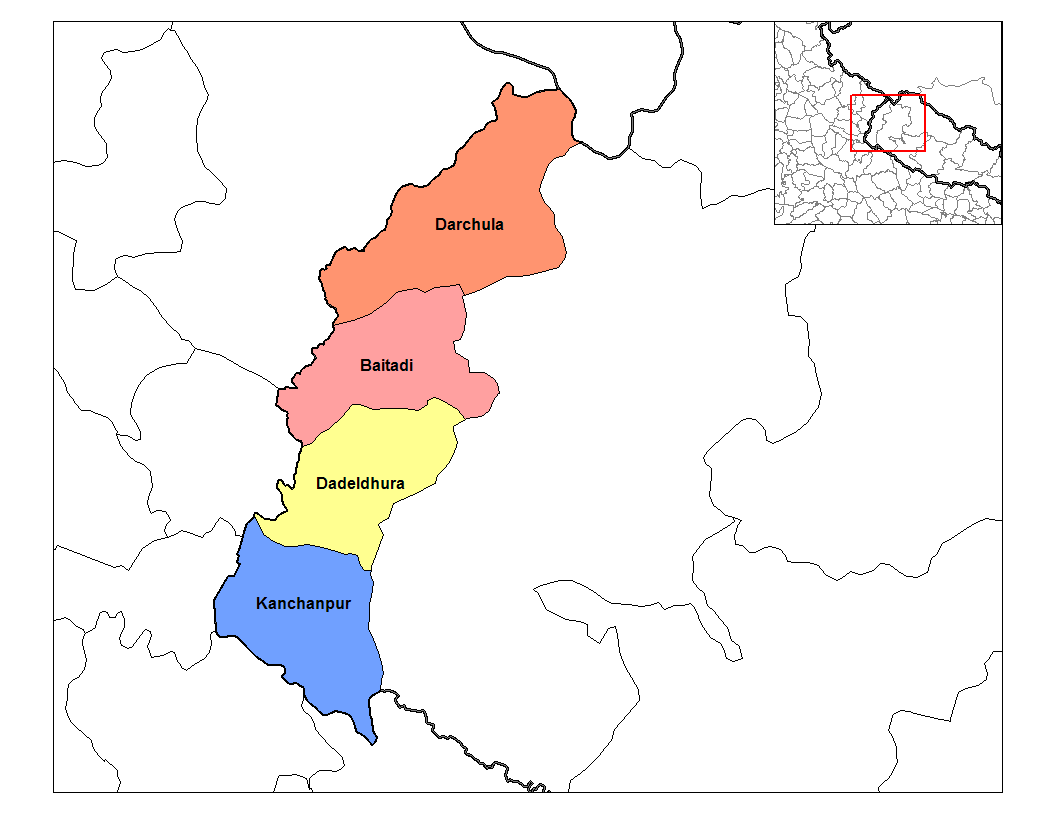
- Country: Nepal
- Named after: Mahakali River
- Capital: Mahendranagar
- Largest city: Bhimdatta
- Districts: List: Kanchanpur District; Baitadi District; Dadeldhura District; Darchula District

Area
  - Total: 7,449.28 km^{2} (2,876.18 sq mi)
- Highest elevation (Mount Api): 7,132 m (23,399 ft)
- Lowest elevation: 176 m (577 ft)

Population (2011)
  - Total: 977,514
  - Density: 131.223/km^{2} (339.865/sq mi)
- Time zone: UTC+5:45 (Nepal Time)
- Official language: Nepali
- Other Official language(s): 1. Doteli; 2. Baitadeli
- Major highways: Mahendra Highway, Postal Highway, Mahakali Highway, Mahakali Corridor

Mahakali (Nepali: महाकाली अञ्चल) was one of the fourteen zones located in the Far-Western Development Region of Nepal, covering an area of 7449.28 km^{2} in the westernmost part of the country. It stretches along Nepal's far western border with India, marked by the Kali River or Mahakali River.

In 2015 Nepal discontinued use of zone designations in favor of provinces. The zone formerly known as Mahakali is now part of Sudurpashchim Province.

Mahakali's headquarters is Bhimdatta (formerly called Mahendranagar) in Kanchanpur District. The zone covers the Himalayan range including Api Peak in the North, Hill valleys, Inner Terai valleys such as Patan Municipality in Baitadi District in the center and the outer Terai in the South. The name of this zone is derived from the Kali River.

== Geography ==
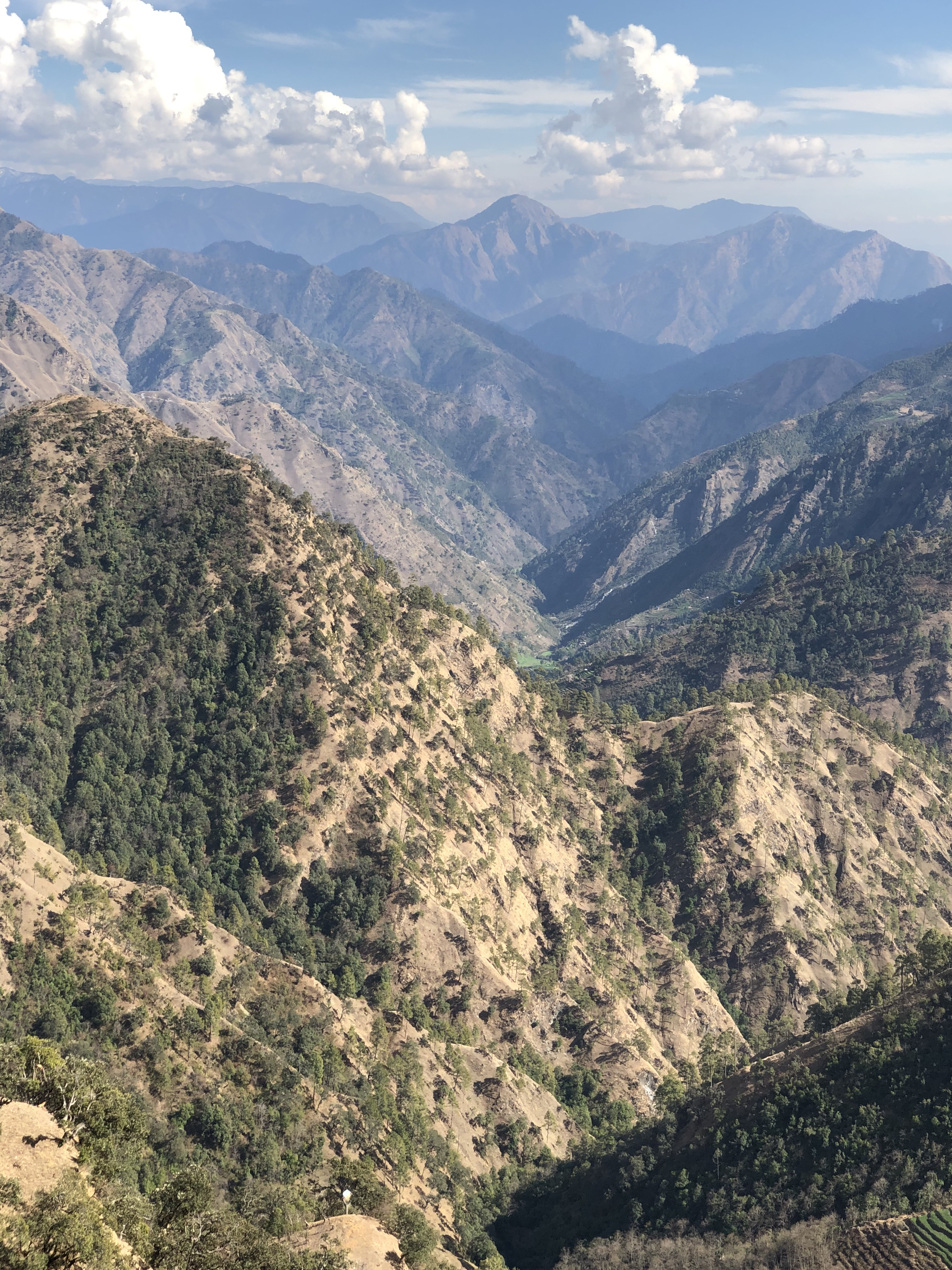
Mahakali in March 2019

The boundary of this region was Kali river on the west and Seti Zone on the east. After the Sugauli Treaty (also spelled Segowlee) was signed on December 2, 1815 and ratified on March 4, 1816, between the British East India Company and The Kingdom of Nepal; Kali river which originates from Limpiyadhura, became the international boundary with the United Provinces of British India (now Uttarakhand, India). The coldest area in the zone is Byash and the hottest is Kanchanpur. The Api Himalayas lie in this zone from where Chameliya river originates.

== Administrative subdivisions ==
Mahakali was divided into four districts; since 2015 these districts have been redesignated as part of Sudurpashchim Province.

District	Type	Headquarters	Since 2015 part of Province
Baitadi	Hill	Baitadi Khalanga	Sudurpashchim Province
Dadeldhura	Hill and Inner Terai	Dadeldhura	Sudurpashchim Province
Darchula	Mountain	Darchula Khalanga	Sudurpashchim Province
Kanchanpur	Outer Terai	Bhim Datta (Mahendranagar)	Sudurpashchim Province

== Language, culture and history ==
Mahakali Zone of Nepal has a distinct language, culture and history. Various dialects of Dotyali language are spoken in this region.

Gora is a famous festival observed in Mahakali Zone. In ancient times, this region was a part of the Katyuri kingdom. After its collapse, this zone became a part of Doti kingdom, a branch of the Katyuri Kings. Brahmadev Mandir in Kanchanpur District was built during the reign of the Katyuri king Brahmadev.

== Famous and religious places ==
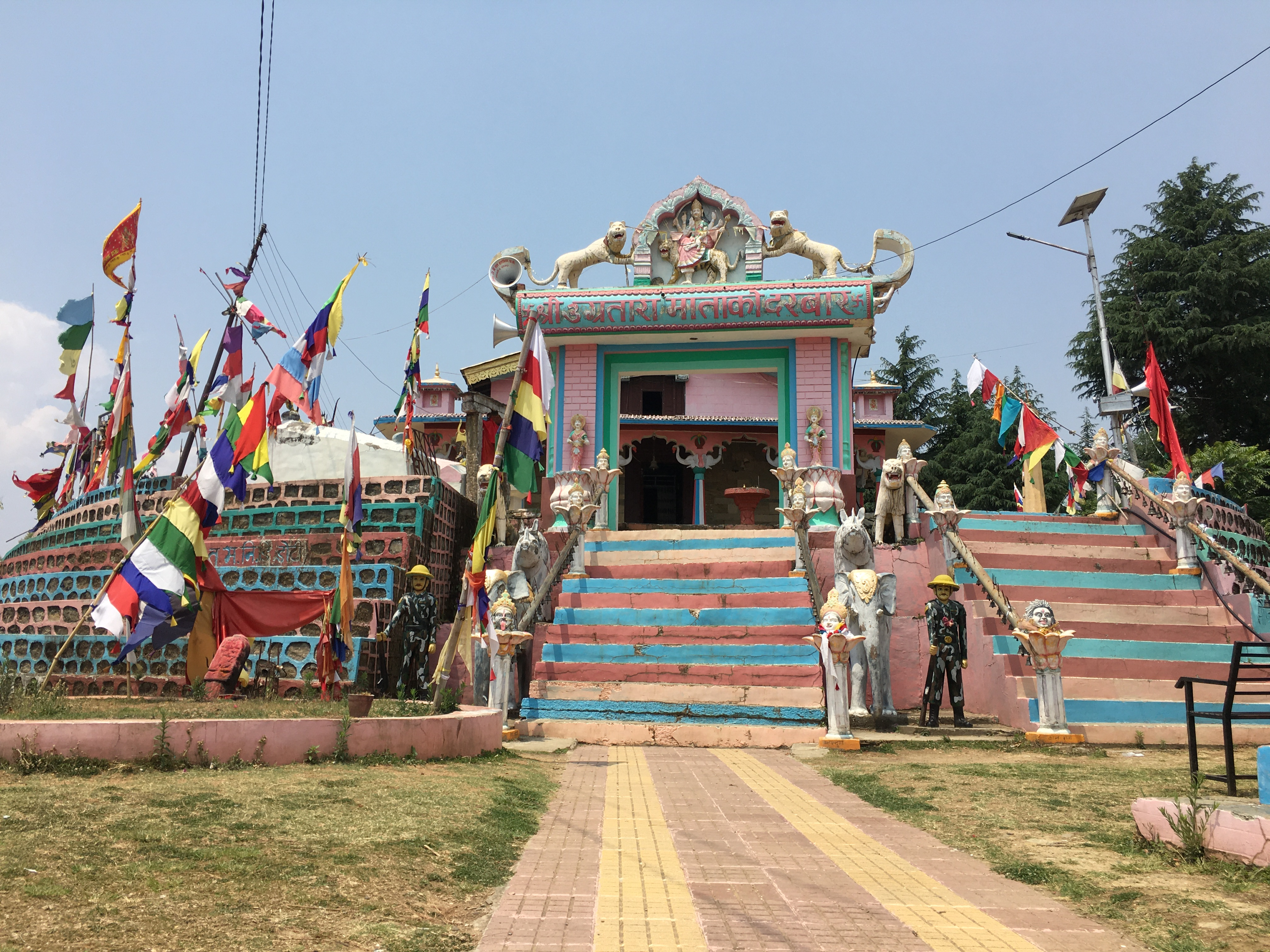
Ugratara Temple, Dadeldhura

- Badimalika Temple
- Malikarjun Temple

== Important cities ==
The largest city in the Mahakali Zone is Bhimdatta (or Bhim Datta, formerly called Mahendranagar), which is also the headquarters of Kanchanpur District. Other main towns of Mahakali Zone are Dashrathchand, Patan (Baitadi) and Darchula Bajar.

The Amargadhi, the district headquarters, is named after General Amarshing Thapa (a famous Gorkha General) who formed a fort to expand Gorkha Empire capturing Kumaoun state after had defeated in a previous war with Kumaoun during 1790 A.D.

Rajghat is also a famous city of Kanchanpur District. It is located at Raikawar Bichawa VDC.

There are 3 municipalities in Kanchanpur District.

== Protected areas ==
Mahakali Zone hosts the Sukla Phanta Wildlife Reserve in Kanchanpur District in the Terai, which covers an area of 305 km^{2} and surrounded by a buffer zone of 243.5 km^{2}.

== See also ==
- Development Regions of Nepal (Former)
- List of zones of Nepal (Former)
- List of districts of Nepal
