= National Games of Nepal =

Nepalese sporting event

- Abbreviation: NGN
- Purpose: Sports for elite athletes in Nepal
- Frequency: Every 2 years, Sometimes uneven years
- Inaugurated: 1982; 44 years ago
- Most recent: 2022
- Next event: 2026
- Most Titles: Bagmati Province
- Headquarters: National Sports Council (Nepal), Tripureshwor, Kathmandu; Nepal Olympic Committee Satdobato, Lalitpur
- Website: nocnepal.org.np nsc.gov.np

The National Games of Nepal is a multi-sport event held in Nepal. It Comprises various discipline in which sportsmen from the provinces and departmental teams of Nepal compete against each other. The games are organized by National Sports Council (Nepal), Nepal Olympic Committee and the host province.

Bagmati Province have dominated the games throughout their history, having won 7 of 10 the official editions.

== Teams ==
=== Currently participating teams ===
List	Team	Debut
1.	Koshi Province	2019
2.	Madhesh Province	2019
3.	Bagmati Province	2019
4.	Gandaki Province	2019
5.	Lumbini Province	2019
6.	Karnali Province	2019
7.	Sudurpashchim Province	2019
8.	Non-Resident Nepali Association	2019
9.	Armed Police Force Club	2009
10.	Nepal Police Club	1999
11.	Nepal Army Club	1999

=== Former teams ===
- Mechi Zone (1982–1986)
- Kosi Zone (1982–1986)
- Sagarmatha Zone (1982–1986)
- Janakpur Zone (1982–1986)
- Narayani Zone (1982–1986)
- Bagmati Zone (1982–1986)
- Gandaki Zone (1982–1986)
- Dhaulagiri Zone (1982–1986)
- Lumbini Zone (1982–1986)
- Rapti Zone (1982–1986)
- Bheri Zone (1982–1986)
- Karnali Zone (1982–1986)
- Seti Zone (1982–1986)
- Mahakali Zone (1982–1986)
- Eastern Region (1999–2016)
- Central Region (1999–2016)
- Western Region (1999–2016)
- Mid-Western Region (1999–2016)
- Far-Western Region (1999–2016)
- People's Liberation Army (2009–2012)
- University (2012)

== Tournament history ==
Edition	Year (A.D.)	Year (B.S.)	Host(s)	Dates	Sports	Events	Teams	Competitors	Top Placed Team	Ref
1	1982	2038	Kathmandu	11 – 19 September 1982	16	72	14	1,543	Bagmati Zone	
2	1984	2040	Pokhara	25 March – 2 April 1984	19	124	14	2,507	Bagmati Zone	
3	1986	2042	Birgunj	6 – 15 March 1986	21	146	14	2,775	Bagmati Zone	
4	1999	2055	Nepalgunj	22 – 28 March 1999	12	140	7	1,622	Central Region	
5	2009	2065	Kathmandu	6 –12 April 2009	34	281	9	4,713	Central Region	
6	2012	2068	Dhangadhi and Mahendranagar	27 March – 3 April 2012	32	321	10	3,619	Central Region	
7	2016	2073	Biratnagar	23 – 30 December 2016	30	263	8	3,972	Nepal Army	
8	2019	2076	Nepalgunj	10 – 25 April 2019	35	333	11	5,211	Nepal Army	
9	2022	2079	Gandaki	14 – 20 October 2022	36	397	11	6,102	Nepal Army	
10	2026	2083	Karnali	2 – 15 December 2026	32	381	11	~6,000	TBD	
11	2028	2085	Madhesh	TBD	TBD	TBD	TBD	TBD	TBD	

== Events ==
Events in bold have taken place since the first tournament.

- **Archery**
- **Athletics**
- **Football**
- **Badminton**
- **Volleyball**
- **Chess**
- **Kabaddi**
- **Gymnastics**
- **Table tennis**
- **Cricket**
- **Weightlifting**
- **Handball**
- **Boxing**
- **Bodybuilding**
- **Swimming**
- Field hockey
- Tennis
- Shooting
- Taekwondo
- Wrestling
- Karate
- Wushu
- Kho kho
- **Arm wrestling**
- ITF taekwondo
- Full contact karate
- Basketball
- Judo
- Golf
- Cue sports
- Cycling
- Squash
- Soft tennis
- Paragliding
- Sepak takraw
- Fencing

=== Previous events ===
- Bagh-chal
- Lok dohori
- Folk song
- Folk dance

== See also ==
- Sports in Nepal
- Nepal Olympic Committee
- National Sports Council
