= 2016 National Games of Nepal =

Sports event

7th National Games of Nepal
- Host city: Biratnagar
- Country: Nepal
- Edition: 7th
- Teams: 8
- Athletes: 3,972
- Sport: 30
- Opening: 23 December 2016
- Closing: 30 December 2016
- Opened by: Bidya Devi Bhandari (President of Nepal)
- Main venue: Sahid Rangasala, Biratnagar

The 2016 National Games of Nepal, also known as the 7th National Games of Nepal was a national multi-sport event, held from 23 December 2016 to 30 December 2016 in Biratnagar, Eastern Region.

== Venues ==
- Biratnagar Rangasala
- Sahid Rangasala

== Participating teams ==
Teams from all 5 Regions, three department sides Nepal Army, Nepal Police Club & Nepal A.P.F. Club participated in this edition of National Games of Nepal.

- Central Region
- Western Region
- Eastern Region
- Mid-Western Region
- Far-Western Region
- Nepal Army
- Nepal Police Club
- Nepal A.P.F. Club

== Medal table ==
2016 National Games medal table
Rank	Team	Gold	Silver	Bronze	Total
1	Tribhuvan Army Club	113	64	48	225
2	Armed Police Force Club	50	48	58	156
3	Nepal Police Club	40	38	41	119
4	Central Region	32	50	57	139
5	Mid-Western Region	9	15	43	67
6	Western Region	8	21	38	67
7	Eastern Region*	7	17	49	73
8	Far-Western Region	4	11	59	74
Total (8 teams)		263	264	393	920

== Theme song ==
The theme song for the 2016 National Games was performed by Sumit Kadka and Prashna Shakya.
