= 2012 National Games of Nepal =

Sports event

6th National Games of Nepal
- Host city: Dhangadi & Mahendranagar
- Country: Nepal
- Edition: 6th
- Teams: 10
- Athletes: 3,619
- Sport: 32
- Opening: 27 March 2012
- Closing: 3 April 2012
- Opened by: Ram Baran Yadav (President of Nepal)
- Main venue: Dhangadi Rangasala, Mahendranagar

The 2012 National Games of Nepal, also known as the 6th National Games of Nepal was a national multi-sport event, held from 27 March 2012 to 3 April 2012 in Mahendranagar & Dhangadi, Far-Western Region.

== Venues ==
- Dhangadi Rangasala
- Mahendranagar Stadium

== Participating teams ==
Teams from all 5 Regions, four department sides Nepal Army, Nepal Police Club, Nepal A.P.F. Club & Liberation Army & University Team participated in this edition of National Games of Nepal.

- Central Region
- Western Region
- Eastern Region
- Mid-Western Region
- Far-Western Region
- Nepal Army
- Nepal Police Club
- Nepal A.P.F. Club
- People's Liberation Army
- University Team

== Medal table ==
2012 National Games medal table
Rank	Team	Gold	Silver	Bronze	Total
1	Central Region	129	85	90	304
2	Nepal Police Club	54	43	34	131
3	Armed Police Force Club	46	42	46	134
4	Western Region	27	52	65	144
5	Far-Western Region*	23	25	52	100
6	People's Liberation Army	18	17	25	60
7	Eastern Region	11	27	87	125
8	Mid-Western Region	10	19	61	90
9	University	3	8	6	18
Total (9 teams)		321	319	466	1,106
