= 2026 National Games of Nepal =

Sports event

10th National Games of Nepal
- Host city: Surkhet, Karnali
- Country: Nepal
- Edition: 10th
- Teams: 12 (expected)
- Athletes: 6,000+(expected)
- Sport: 37
- Opening: 2 December 2026 (scheduled)
- Main venue: Karnali Stadium, Surkhet
- Website: Nepal Olympic Committee, National Sports Council

The 2024 National Games of Nepal, also known as the 10th National Games of Nepal or Karnali 2024, is an upcoming national multi-sport event scheduled to take place from to 2 to 15 December 2026 in Karnali Province, Nepal. It is the 10th edition of the National Games of Nepal. Originally scheduled to take place from November 17 to 24 November 2024, the games have been repeatedly postponed since then.

The National Sports Council during its 115th board meeting alongside the 9th National Games had announced that the 10th National Games are scheduled to take place in Karnali Province from November 17 to 24, 2024.

The NSC during its 118th board meeting rescheduled the national games to be held from April 5 to 12, 2025.

== Challenges for National Games ==
Construction progress of the infrastructure has been uneven. Only, the Karnali province stadium is near completion which supports only around 15 sports, where other venues are being upgraded. Provincial officials also have noted delays in stadiums, district facilities, covered halls and grounds especially for cricket hockey and volleyball. Similarly, academic board exams schedule clash and shifting dates have caused uncertainty among athletes.

== Venues ==
=== Surkhet ===
- Karnali Province Stadium
- Kalungchowk Cricket Ground

=== West Rukum ===
- Chaurjahari Regional Cricket Ground

=== Humla ===
- Humla District Hockey Ground

=== Jumla ===
- Humla Volleyball Ground
- Chisapani Football Ground (Women's Group Stage)
- Mehalkuna Football Ground (Men's Group Stage)

== Participating teams ==
Teams are expected from all 7 Provinces and 3 departmental Clubs of Nepal as well as a team representing Non-Resident Nepali, NRNA.

- Bagmati Province
- Gandaki Province
- Karnali Province
- Koshi Province
- Lumbini Province
- Madhesh Province
- Nepal A.P.F. Club
- Nepal Army Club
- Nepal Police Club
- NRNA
- Sudurpashchim Province

== Sports ==
37 disciplines(35+2 Exhibition) will be contested in the 2024 National Games.

10th National Games of Nepal
- Aquatics ()
  - Diving
  - Swimming
  - Water polo
- Archery ()
- Athletics ()
- Badminton ()
- Basketball ()
- Beach sports
  - Beach football ()
  - Beach handball ()
  - Beach volleyball ()
- Bodybuilding ()
- Boxing ()
- Canoeing ()
- Chess ()
- Cricket ()
- Cue sports ()
  - Billiards
  - Snooker
- Cycling ()
- Fencing ()
- Field hockey ()
- Football ()
- Golf ()
  - Lawn golf
- Gymnastics ()
- Handball ()
- Karate ()
  - Full contact karate
- Martial arts
  - ITF Taekwondo
  - Judo ()
  - Taekwondo ()
  - Wushu ()
- Netball ()
- Paragliding ()
- Rugby union ()
- Shooting ()
- Skateboarding ()
- Softball ()
- Soft tennis ()
- Squash ()
- Swimming ()
- Table tennis ()
- Tennis ()
- Traditional sports
  - Kabaddi ()
  - Kho kho ()
  - Sepak takraw ()
- Triathlon ()
- Volleyball ()
- Weightlifting ()
- Wrestling ()

== Medal table ==
2024 National Games medal table
Rank	State	Gold	Silver	Bronze	Total
1	Bagmati Province	0	0	0	0
1	Gandaki Province	0	0	0	0
1	Karnali Province*	0	0	0	0
1	Koshi Province	0	0	0	0
1	Lumbini Province	0	0	0	0
1	Madhesh Province	0	0	0	0
1	NRNA	0	0	0	0
1	Nepal A.P.F. Club	0	0	0	0
1	Nepal Army	0	0	0	0
1	Nepal Police Club	0	0	0	0
1	Sudurpashchim Province	0	0	0	0
Totals (11 entries)		0	0	0	0
