= 1999 National Games of Nepal =

Sports event

4th National Games of Nepal
- Host city: Nepalgunj
- Country: Kingdom of Nepal
- Edition: 4th
- Teams: 7
- Athletes: ?
- Sport: 12
- Opening: 22 March 1999
- Closing: 28 March 1999
- Opened by: Crown Prince Dipendra
- Main venue: Nepalgunj Stadium, Banke

The 1999 National Games of Nepal, also known as the 4th National Games of Nepal was a national multi-sport event, held from 22 March 1999 to 28 March 1999 in Nepalgunj, Lumbini Zone.

== Venues ==
- Nepalgunj Stadium

== Participating teams ==
Teams from all 5 regions and two department sides Nepal Army & Nepal Police Club participated in this edition of National Games of Nepal.

- Central Region
- Western Region
- Eastern Region
- Mid-Western Region
- Far-Western Region
- Nepal Army
- Nepal Police Club

== Medal table ==
1999 National Games medal table
Rank	Team	Gold	Silver	Bronze	Total
1	Central Region	49	31	32	112
2	Tribhuvan Army Club	29	38	21	88
3	Nepal Police Club	25	14	20	59
4	Western Region	13	18	21	52
5	Eastern Region	12	27	39	78
6	Mid-Western Region*	7	15	32	54
7	Far-Western Region	5	7	24	36
Total (7 teams)		140	150	189	479
