= Far-Western Development Region, Nepal =

Coordinates: 29°16′N 80°56′E

Far-Western Development Region सुदुर-पश्चिमाञ्चल विकास क्षेत्र
- Former Development Region
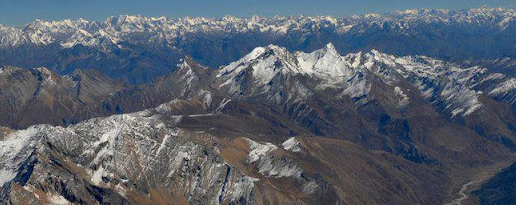
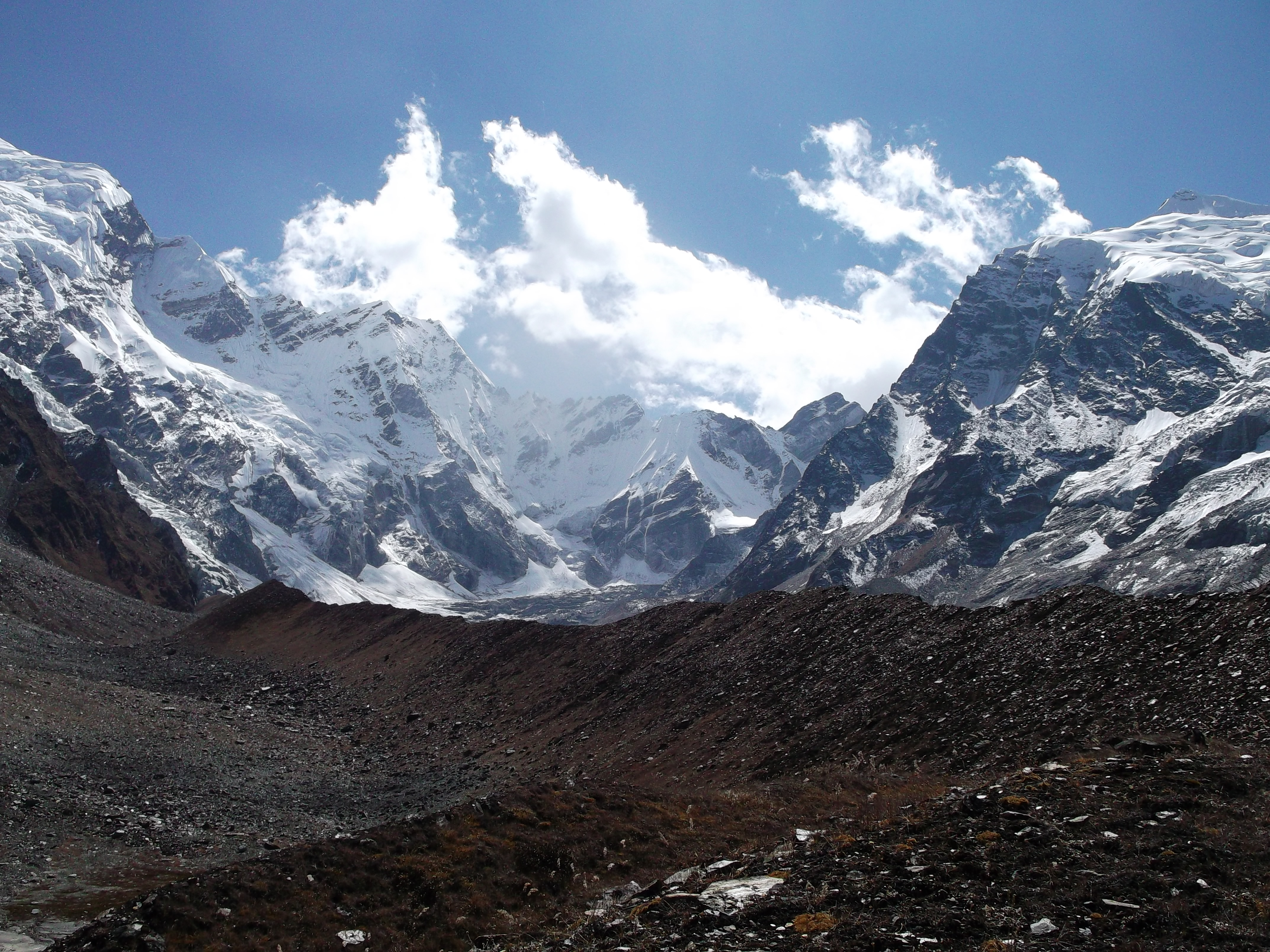
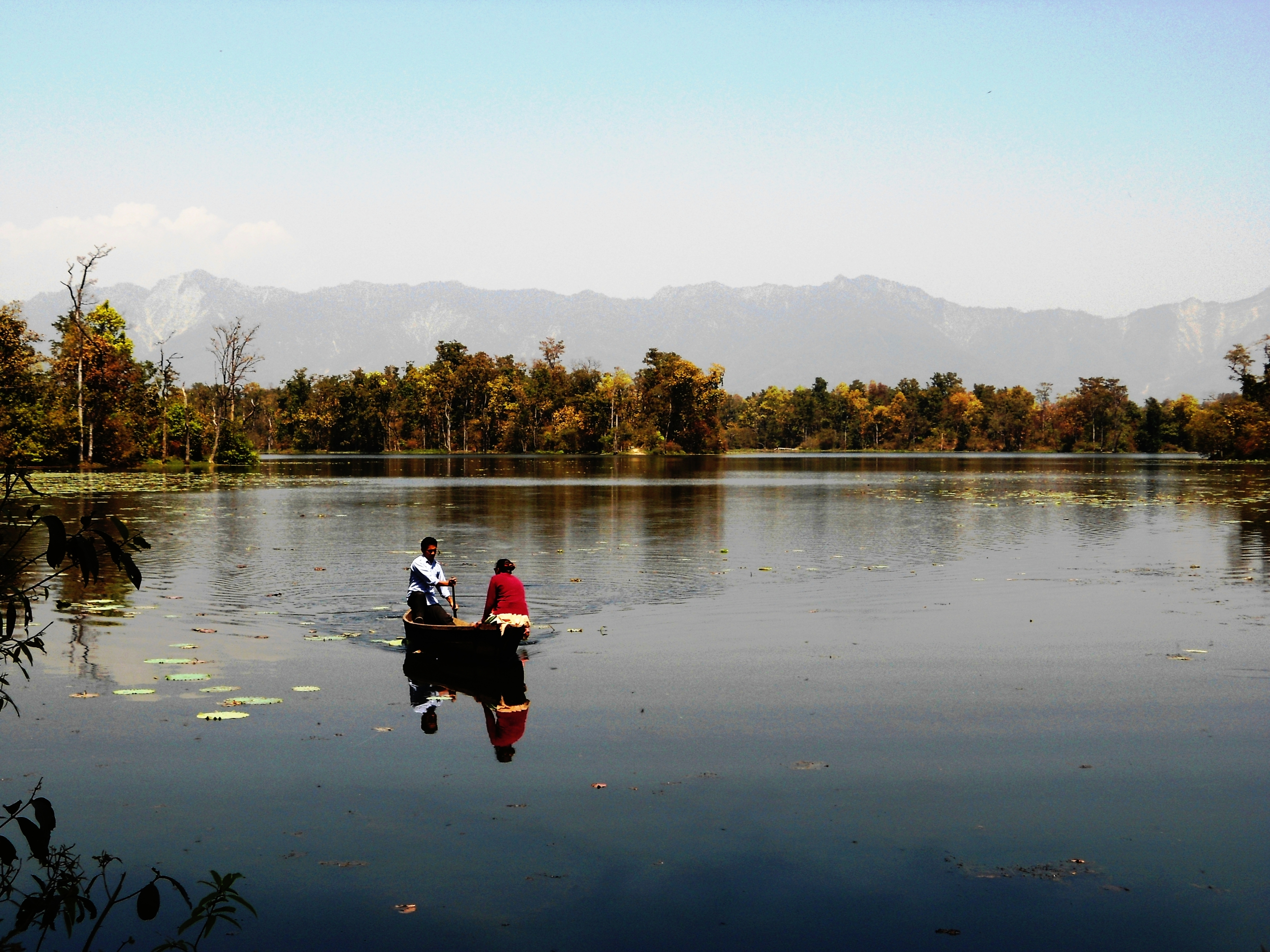
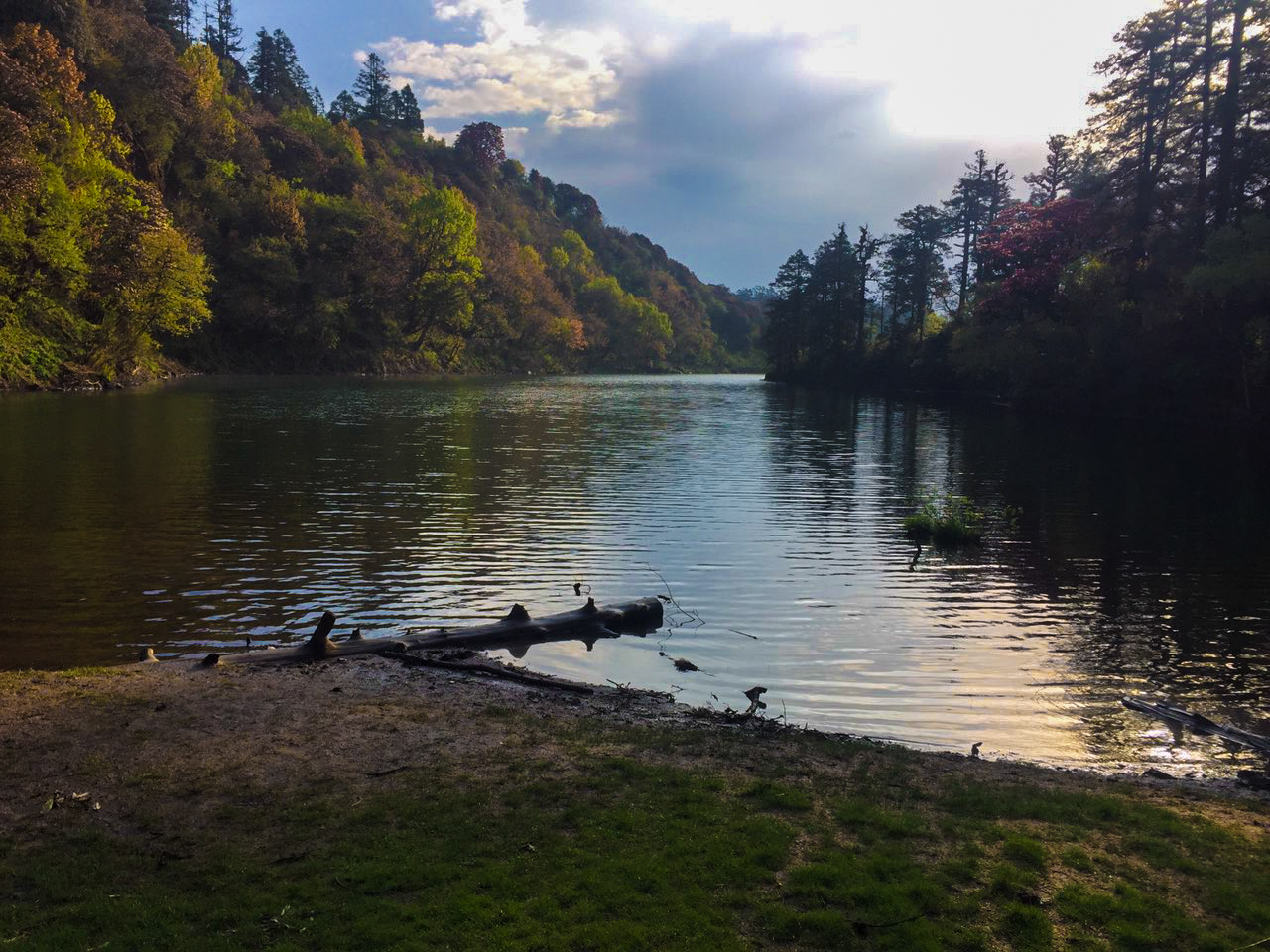
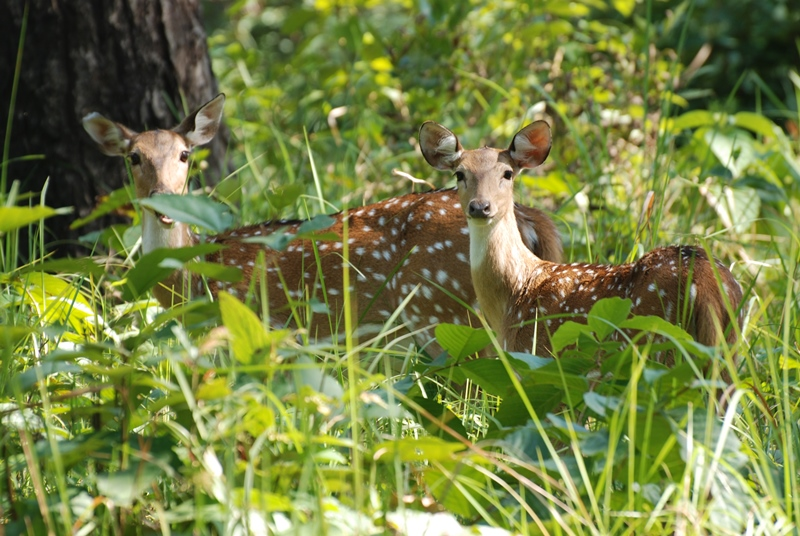
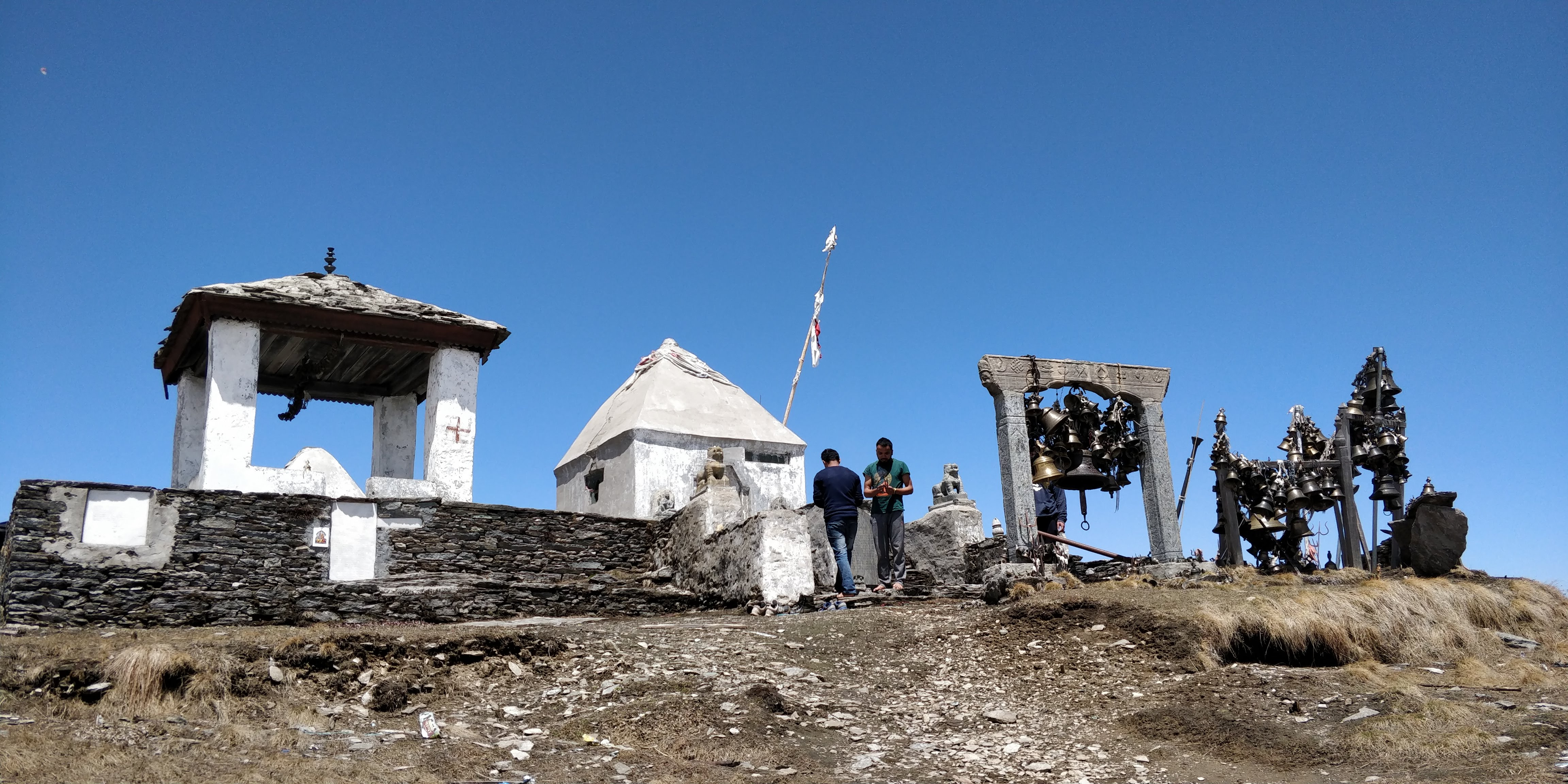
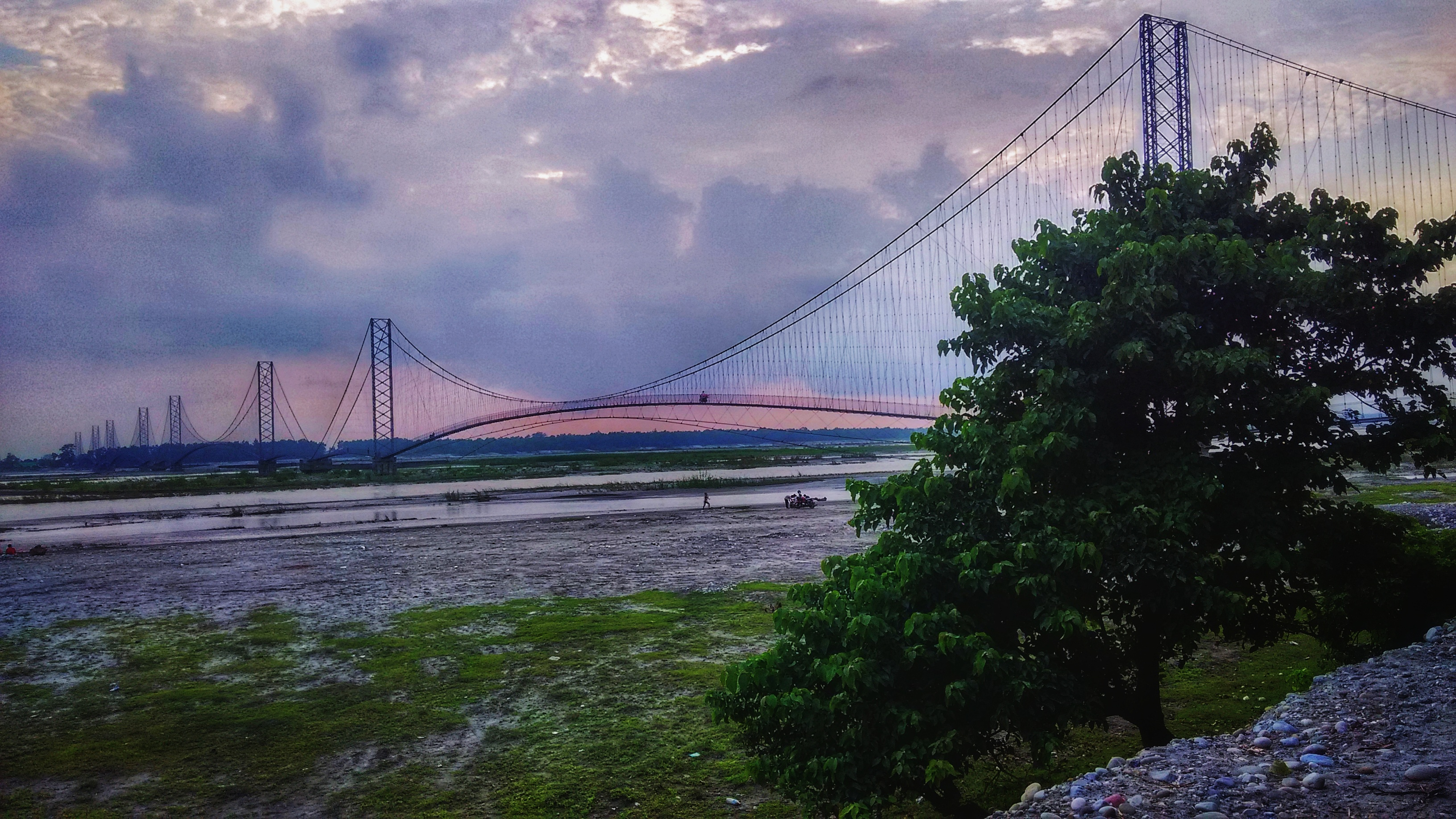
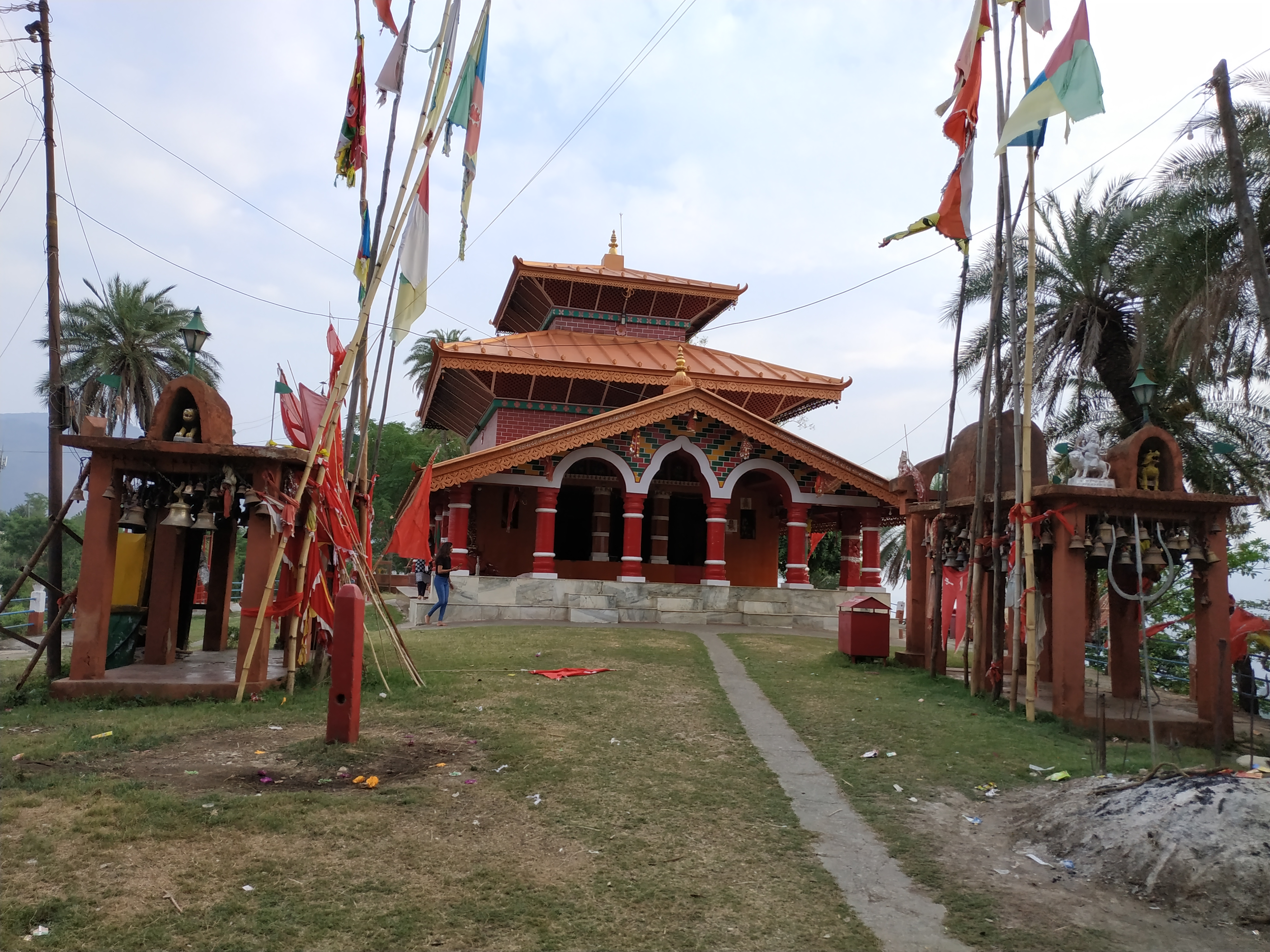
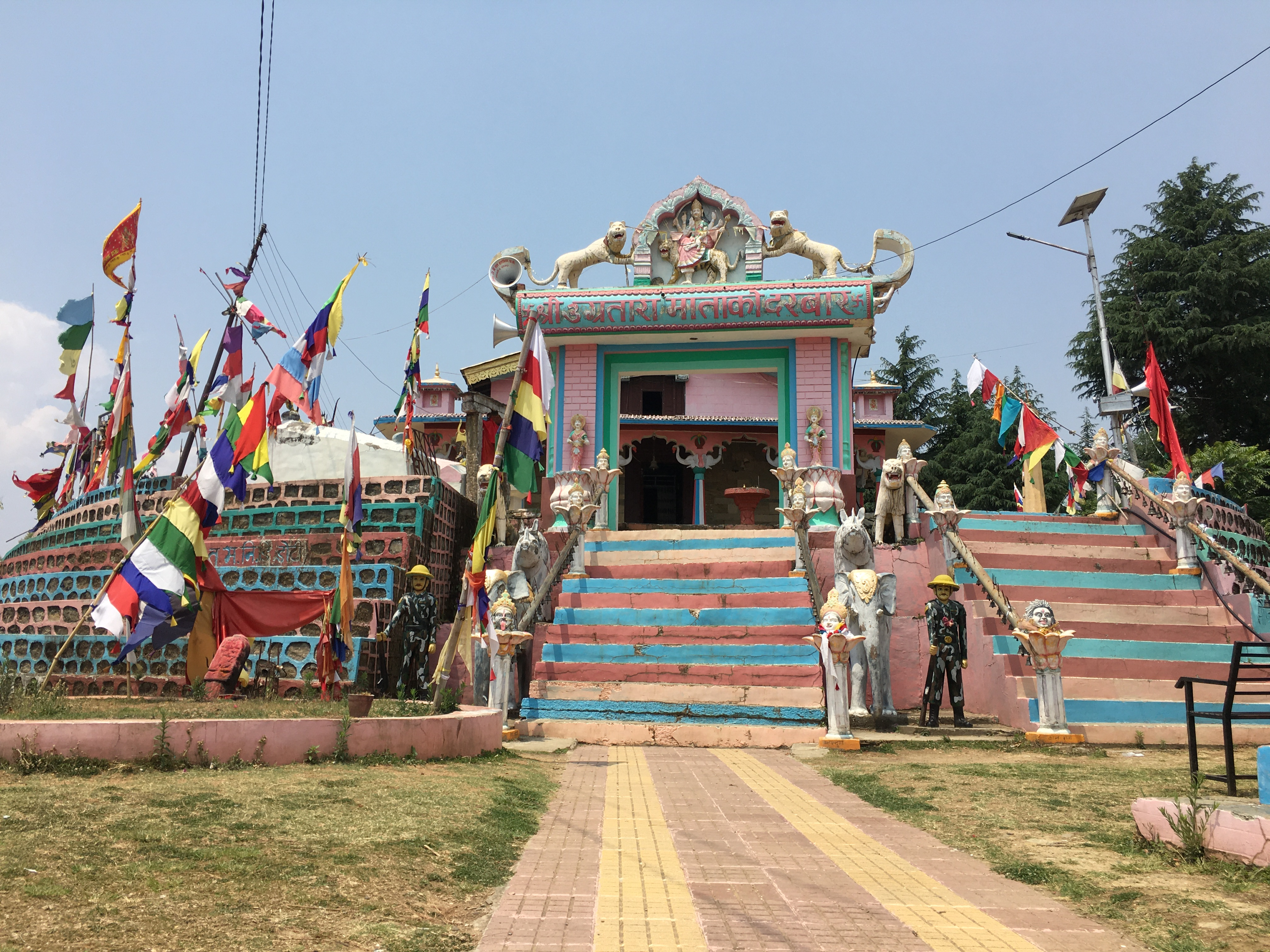
- Clockwise from top Saipal, Api Himal, Ghodaghodi Lake, Khaptad Lake, Swamp deer at Shuklaphanta National Park, Badimalika Temple, Dodhara Chandani Bridge, Tripurasundari, Baitadi, Ugratara Temple
- Interactive map of Far-Western Development Region
- Country: Nepal
- Headquarters: Dipayal Silgadhi, Doti District, Seti Zone
- Largest city: Dhangadhi

Area
  - Total: 19,539 km^{2} (7,544 sq mi)
- Highest elevation (Mt Api): 7,132 m (23,399 ft)
- Lowest elevation: 109 m (358 ft)

Population (2011 Census)
  - Total: 2,552,517
  - Density: 131/km^{2} (340/sq mi)
- pop. note
- Time zone: UTC+5:45 (NPT)
- Official language: Nepali
- Other Official language(s): 1. Doteli; 2. Tharu (Rana)
- HDI (2021): 0.583 (medium)
- Literacy: ▲76.2% (2024)
- Sex ratio: 91.25 ♂ /100 ♀ (2011)

The Far-Western Development Region (Nepali: सुदुर पश्चिमाञ्चल विकास क्षेत्र, romanized: Sudura Paścimāñcala Vikāsa Kṣētra, lit. 'Far Western Development Region') was one of Nepal's five development regions. It was located at the western end of the country and had its headquarters in Dipayal.

The Far-Western Region covered 19,999.28 km^{2} (7,721.77 sq mi) square kilometers. It had nine districts with the regional headquarters at Dipayal, Doti district. The Far-Western Region was remote and developmentally challenged. Some 44% of people in the Far West Hills and 49% in the Himalayan districts lived below the poverty line. The region had limited basic services. The difficult topography complicated development. The region had complex socio-economic structures. Traditional systems associated with religion, culture and customs had limited overall development.

It comprised two zones:

- Mahakali
- Seti

The region was sometimes called the Doti region, which some believe originated from 'Dovati' meaning land between two rivers. Others believed it originated from the Hindu god Dev and Aatavi, meaning the place of re-creation. History went back to the 13th century when Niranjan Malldeo founded the Doti Kingdom following the fall of the Katyuri Kings. Dotiyali and Khas language were spoken there. Deuda, Jhoda, Chhpeli, Chhaliya, Bhada etc. were traditional regional dances and Gaura/Gamara is the biggest festival.

== History ==
Doti was an ancient kingdom of the Far-Western region of Nepal which was formed after disintegration of the Katyuri kingdom of Kumaon and the Far-Western region during the 13th century. Doti was one of eight princely states formed after the Kurmanchal Kingdom broke up. The others were Baijnath-Katyuri, Dwarahat, Doti, Baramandal, Askot, Sira, Sora and Sui (Kali kumaon). The kingdom broke up because of the invasion of Khas kings Ashoka challa and Krachalla from Karnali Zone (Dullu) of Nepal in 1191 and 1223 respectively. Later on, the land between Ramganga on the west (Uttarakhand) and the Karnali on the east came under Raikas after the origin of Raikas of Katyuris in Doti. "Brahma Dev Mandi" at Kanchanpur District of Mahakali Zone was established by Katyuri king Brahma Dev.

=== Raikas ===
Niranjan Malla Dev founded Doti Kingdom around the 13th century after the fall of Katyuris Kingdom. He was the son of Last Katyuris of united Katyuris kingdom. Kings of Doti were known as Raikas (also known as Rainka Maharaj). The Raikas, after the overthrow Khas Malla of Karnali Zone, formed a Raikas Kingdom in the Far-Western Region and Kumaun that was called Doti. So far, the historical evidence for the following Raikas has been discovered:

Niranjan Malla Dev (Founder of Doti Kingdom), Nagi Malla (1238), Ripu Malla (1279), Nirai Pal (1353 may be of Askot and historical evidence of him from 1354 AD has been found in Almoda), Nag Malla (1384), Dhir Malla (1400), Ripu Malla (1410), Anand Malla (1430), Balinarayan Malla (not known), Sansar Malla (1442), Kalyan Malla (1443), Suratan Malla (1478), Kriti Malla (1482), Prithivi Malla (1488), Medini Jay Malla (1512), Ashok Malla (1517), Raj Malla (1539), Arjun Malla/Sahi (not known but he was ruling Sira as Malla and Doti as Shahi), Bhupati Malla/Shahi (1558), Sagaram Shahi (1567), Hari Malla/Shahi (1581 Last Raikas King of Sira and adjoining part of Nepal), Rudra Shahi (1630), Vikram Shahi (1642), Mandhata Shahi (1671), Raghunath Shahi (1690), Hari Shahi (1720), Krishna Shahi (1760), Deep Shahi (1785), Prithivi pati Shahi (1790, 'he had fought against the Nepali Ruler (Gorkhali Ruler) with British in 1814 A.D').

The historic place of war between the Doti Kingdom and Nepal (Gorkha kingdom) during the period of Gorkha Expansion in 1790, according to the history of Nepal, is Nari-Dang, on the bank of the Seti River. The Dumrakot was the base of Doti Kingdom for fighting against Gorkhali.

=== Mongol/Mughal invasion ===
During the period of Akbar, 16th century, Mongols (Mughals) attacked the Raikas. They invaded Ajemeru, capital of the Raikas Kingdom. Ajemeru is now in Dadeldhura District in the Far-Western region. According to Indo-Persian historian Abd-ul-Qadir Bada'uni (c. 1540 – 1615), Army Chief of Akbar, Khan, lured by the wealth and treasury of the Raikas state, attempted to plunder the state, but did not succeed.

== Major cities ==
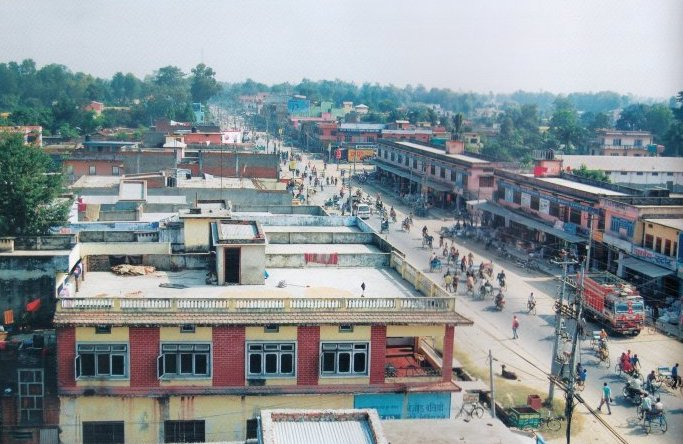
Dhangadhi, Kailali District

Dhangadhi is a sub metropolitan city in Far-Western Nepal (Sudurpashchim Province) is located in Kailali District of Seti Zone.

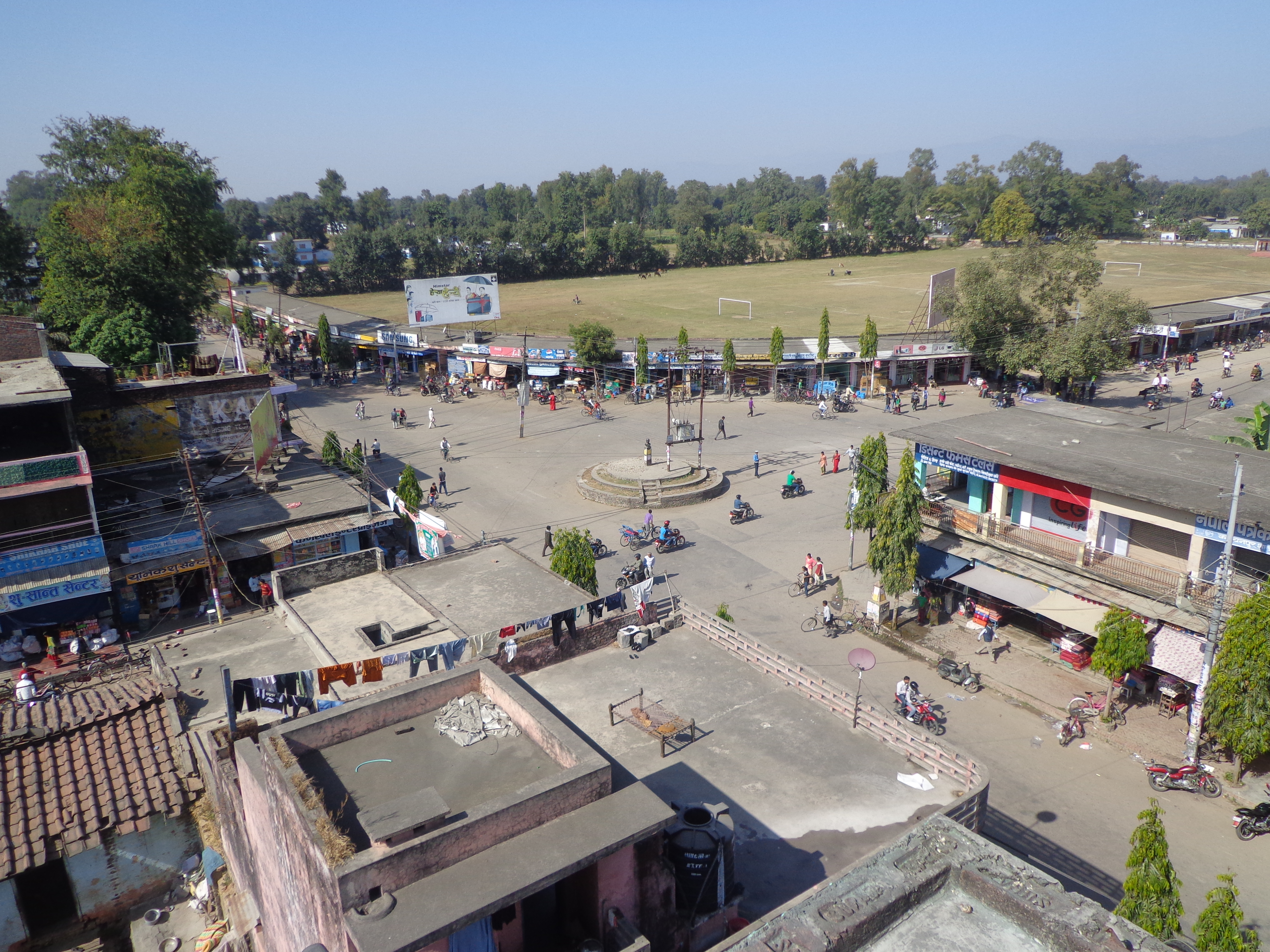
Madan chowk, Mahendranagar

Mahendranagar is the headquarters of the Kanchanpur District in Mahakali Zone. It is located nearby Mahakali River, 6 km north of the India border, and is inhabited by the indigenous Tharu people and other groups.

Tikapur is another biggest city in the Far-Western region. It was popular for tourism and trade as it serves the best transit point for Nepal-India border in the Far-Western region.

Dipayal-Silgadhi Municipality is the headquarters of Doti District and the Far-Western Region. It was within trekking distance of Khaptad National Park. Dipayal was also the name of the valley encompassing the Seti River.

Amargadhi was the headquarters of Dadeldhura District.

== Major National Highways ==
S#	Highway No.	Length	Terminus	Notes
1	NH01	130	Karnali Bridge, Gadda Chauki	Interprovincial NH
2	NH03	262	Belkhet, Jhulaghat	Interprovincial NH
3	NH05	155	Rajapur, Chandani	Interprovincial NH
4	NH09	124	Bini, Jogbuda	Interprovincial NH
5	NH62	228	Khakraula, Gothalakhet	Provincial NH
6	NH63	111	Sanfebagar, Okhartola	Provincial NH
7	NH64	108	Khopde, Chainpur	Provincial NH
8	NH65	296	Khutiya, Taklakot	Provincial NH
9	NH66	350	Dhangadhi, Tinkar	Provincial NH
10	NH67	201	Gadda Chauki, Datu	Provincial NH

== Akhand Sudurpaschim ==
Akhand Sudurpaschim (अखण्ड सुदूरपश्चिम) is a movement orchestrated by the natives of Far Western Region aiming to create a separate province and self-determination rights for the native population. Natives have claimed two districts of Madhesh plain region: Kailali and Kanchanpur, while Madheshi based parties want a separate Madhesh province along with the two districts that geographically lie in the Terai-Madhesh Plains. A movement against the central State “half-blood behavior" began on 26 April 2012, effectively halting state services, and ended upon the dissolution of the constitutional assembly on 28 May 2012.
