= Dipayal Silgadhi =

Dipayal Silgadhi दिपायल सिलगढी नगरपालिका
- Municipality
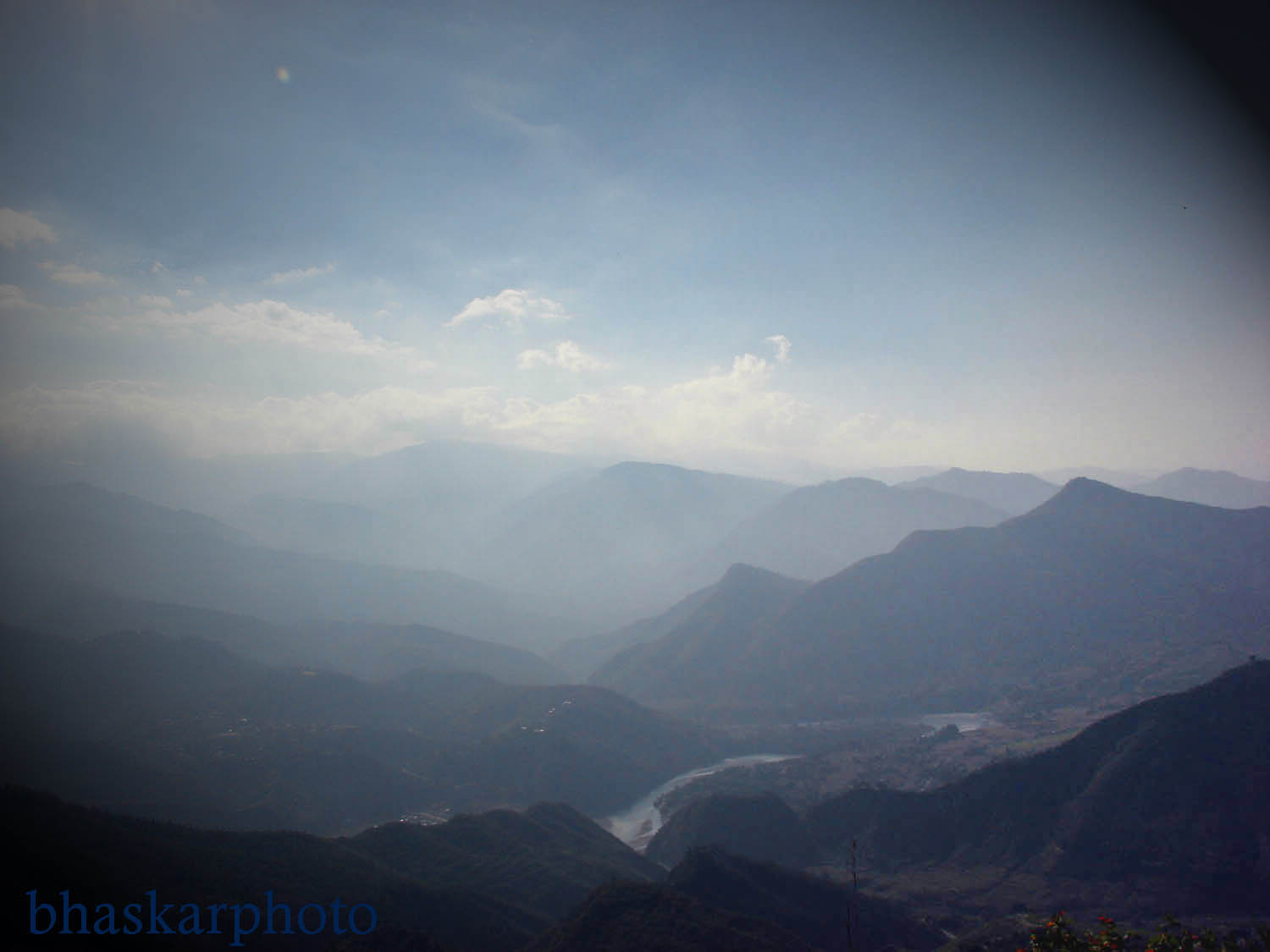
- Seti River valley with Dipayal (left side)

- Location in Nepal
- Coordinates: 29°16′N 80°56′E
- Country: Nepal
- Province: Sudurpashchim Province
- District: Doti District

Government
  - Mayor: Baji singh khadka (Nepali Congress)
  - Deputy Mayor: Kalpana Mahar Saud (Nepali Congress)

Area
  - Total: 72 km^{2} (28 sq mi)
- Elevation: 1,310 m (4,300 ft)

Population (2021)
  - Total: 33,968
  - Density: 470/km^{2} (1,200/sq mi)
- Time zone: UTC+5:45 (Nepal Time)
- Postal code: 10801
- Area code: 094
- Website: http://dipayalsilgadhimun.gov.np

Dipayal Silgadhi (Nepali: दिपायल सिलगढी) is a municipality and the district headquarters of Doti District in Sudurpashchim Province of Nepal. Previously, it also served as the headquarters of the Far-Western Development Region. It lies in the Lesser Himalayas on the bank of Seti River. At the time of the 2011 Nepal census it had a population of 32,941 people living in 7,447 individual households.

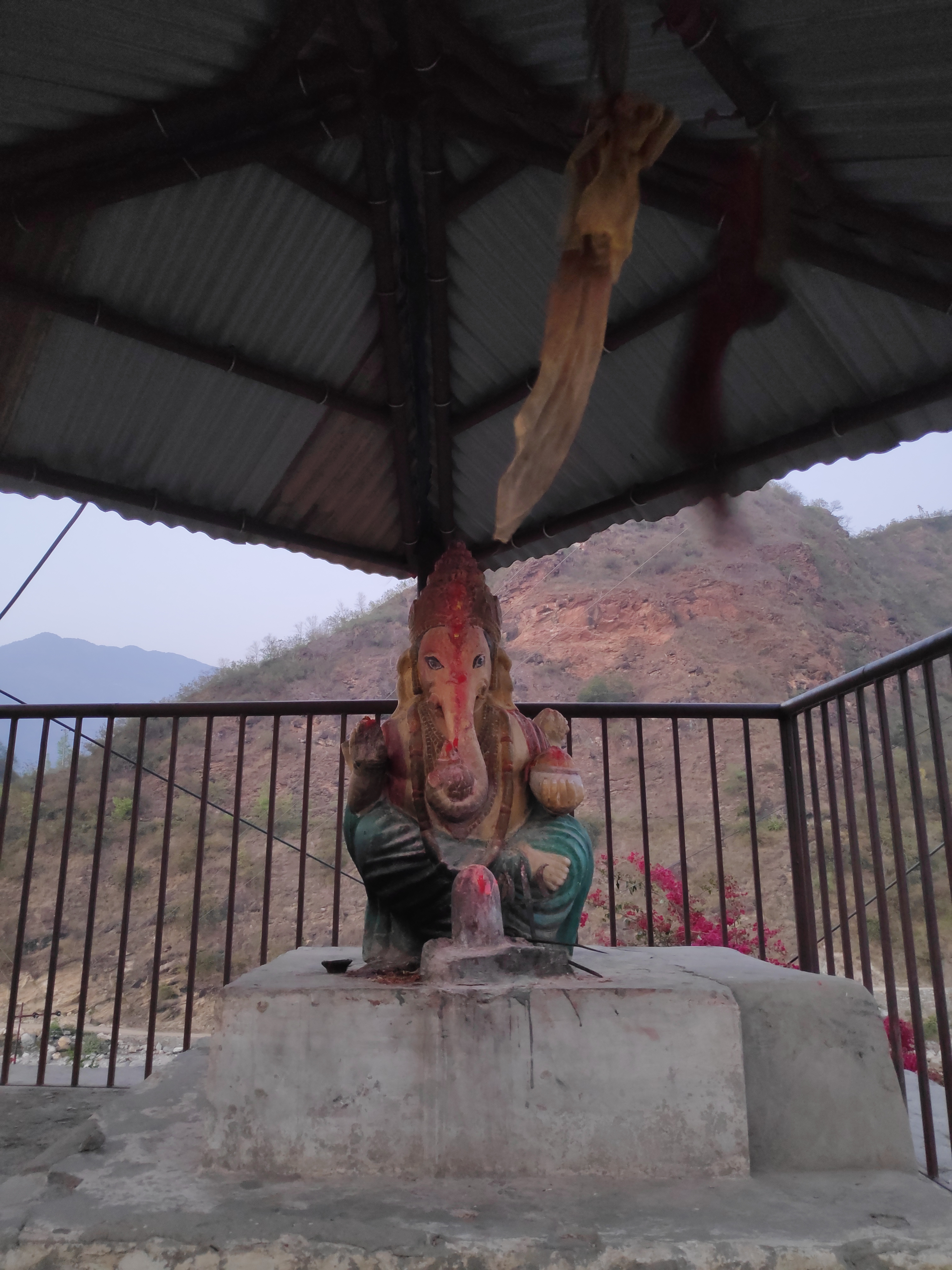
Ganesh at Pipalla Bazaar

Dipayal Silgadhi is a Municipality, which is located in Doti district, Sudurpashchim Province of Nepal. Dipayal Silgadhi has total 9 wards, which are scattered across 163 square kilometers of geographical area. According to 2011 Census conducted by Central Bureau of Statistics (CBS), Dipayal Silgadhi Municipality had total population of 32,941.

== Demographics ==
At the time of the 2011 Nepal census, Dipayal Silgadhi Municipality had a population of 36,038. Of these, 85.8% spoke Doteli, 12.2% Nepali, 0.4% Maithili, 0.4% Tharu, 0.2% Hindi, 0.2% Magar, 0.2% Baitadeli, 0.1% Newar, 0.1% Urdu and 0.2% other languages as their first language.

In terms of ethnicity/caste, 61.9% were Chhetri, 9.9% Kami, 6.5% Damai/Dholi, 5.2% Hill Brahmin, 3.3% other Dalit, 2.3% Lohar, 2.2% Newar, 1.9% Thakuri, 1.7% Badi, 1.4% Sarki, 0.6% Magar, 0.5% Tharu, 0.4% Kumal, 0.4% Majhi, 0.3% Gurung, 0.2% Sanyasi/Dasnami, 0.2% Musalman, 0.1% other Terai, 0.1% Rai, 0.1% Tamang, 0.1% Hajam/Thakur, 0.1% Bengali, 0.1% Halwai and 0.2% others.

In terms of religion, 99.3% were Hindu, 0.4% Christian, 0.2% Muslim and 0.1% Buddhist.

In terms of literacy, 61.2% could read and write, 2.6% could only read and 36.2% could neither read nor write.

== Climate ==
Climate data for Dipayal Silgadhi, elevation 563 m (1,847 ft), (1991–2020 normals, extremes 1982–2017)
Month	Jan	Feb	Mar	Apr	May	Jun	Jul	Aug	Sep	Oct	Nov	Dec	Year
Record high °C (°F)	30.3 (86.5)	33.5 (92.3)	39.2 (102.6)	43.0 (109.4)	45.0 (113.0)	45.2 (113.4)	42.5 (108.5)	38.4 (101.1)	38.8 (101.8)	37.4 (99.3)	35.2 (95.4)	30.0 (86.0)	45.2 (113.4)
Mean daily maximum °C (°F)	22.3 (72.1)	25.4 (77.7)	30.0 (86.0)	34.6 (94.3)	36.7 (98.1)	36.5 (97.7)	34.1 (93.4)	33.8 (92.8)	33.4 (92.1)	31.6 (88.9)	27.6 (81.7)	23.7 (74.7)	30.8 (87.4)
Daily mean °C (°F)	13.7 (56.7)	16.7 (62.1)	20.6 (69.1)	25.1 (77.2)	28.2 (82.8)	29.8 (85.6)	29.3 (84.7)	28.9 (84.0)	27.8 (82.0)	24.1 (75.4)	19.0 (66.2)	14.8 (58.6)	23.2 (73.8)
Mean daily minimum °C (°F)	5.0 (41.0)	7.9 (46.2)	11.1 (52.0)	15.5 (59.9)	19.6 (67.3)	23.1 (73.6)	24.4 (75.9)	23.9 (75.0)	22.2 (72.0)	16.5 (61.7)	10.4 (50.7)	5.9 (42.6)	15.5 (59.9)
Record low °C (°F)	−0.6 (30.9)	0.4 (32.7)	3.2 (37.8)	7.6 (45.7)	10.8 (51.4)	14.6 (58.3)	15.0 (59.0)	14.0 (57.2)	12.0 (53.6)	8.5 (47.3)	5.0 (41.0)	0.2 (32.4)	−0.6 (30.9)
Average precipitation mm (inches)	45.7 (1.80)	50.9 (2.00)	34.8 (1.37)	36.7 (1.44)	68.0 (2.68)	165.0 (6.50)	230.6 (9.08)	224.8 (8.85)	142.6 (5.61)	39.1 (1.54)	4.9 (0.19)	11.2 (0.44)	1,054.3 (41.51)
Average precipitation days (≥ 0.1 mm)	3.4	4.2	3.6	4.9	8.4	11.7	17.0	16.1	9.4	1.9	0.6	0.7	82.0
Source 1: Department of Hydrology and Meteorology
Source 2: World Meteorological Organization

== Transportation ==
Seti Highway begins in Dipayal Silgadhi, linking it to Amargadhi, from where the Terai region of Nepal can be reached on Mahakali Highway.

Doti Airport is now functional operating twice a week lies in Dipayal Silgadhi.

== Media ==
Radio Nepal has a regional station in Dipayal Silgadhi which transmits various programs of mass interest. Silgadhi based Tribeni FM 94.4 MHz, Radio Shaileswori 105.9 MHz are the F.M. station here to serve people. Among them Tribeni FM and Radio Shaileswori are Community radio Station.

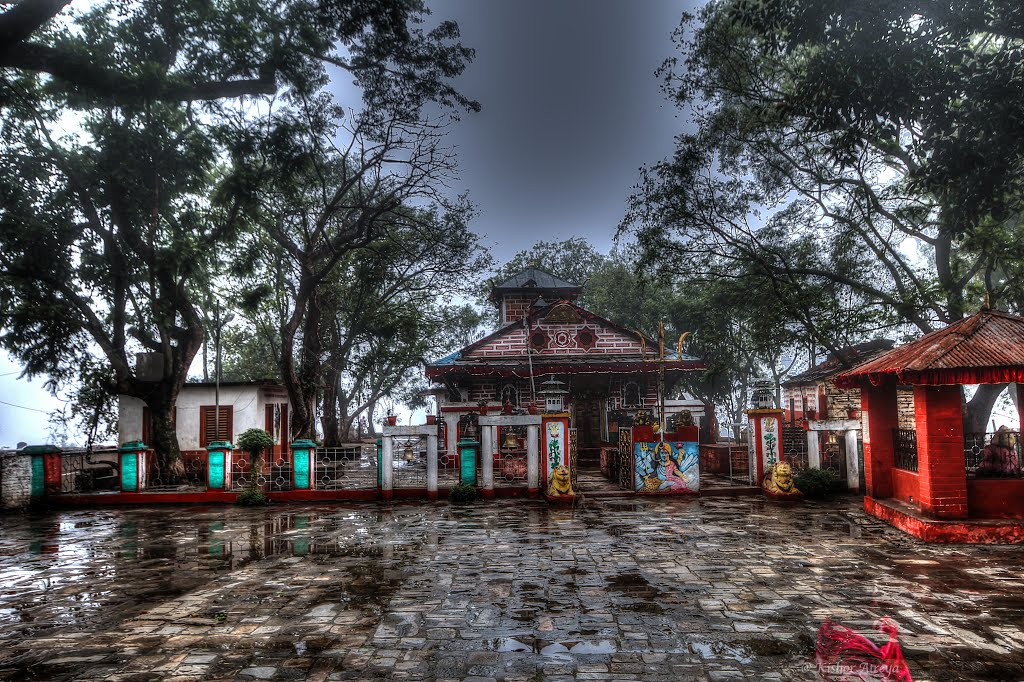
Saileswori Temple
