= Jamuna Gurung =

Jamuna Gurung may refer to

- Jamuna Gurung (footballer)
- Jamuna Gurung (entrepreneur)
