= 2009 National Games of Nepal =

Sports event

5th National Games of Nepal
- Host city: Kathmandu
- Country: Nepal
- Edition: 5th
- Teams: 8
- Athletes: 4,713
- Sport: 34
- Opening: 6 April 2009
- Closing: 12 April 2009
- Opened by: Ram Baran Yadav (President of Nepal)
- Main venue: Dasarath Stadium Kathmandu

The 2009 National Games of Nepal, also known as the 5th National Games of Nepal was a national level multi-sport event, held from 6 April 2009 to 12 April 2009 in Kathmandu, Central Region.

== Venues ==
- Dasarath Stadium

== Participating teams ==
Teams from all 5 Regions and four department sides Nepal Army, Nepal Police Club, Nepal A.P.F. Club & Liberation Army participated in this edition of National Games of Nepal.

- Central Region
- Western Region
- Eastern Region
- Mid-Western Region
- Far-Western Region
- Nepal Army
- Nepal Police Club
- Nepal A.P.F. Club
- People's Liberation Army

== Medal table ==
2009 National Games medal table (Regional category)
Rank	Team	Gold	Silver	Bronze	Total
1	Central Region*	71	35	32	138
2	Armed Police Force Club	32	17	15	64
3	Nepal Police Club	27	39	23	89
4	Western Region	20	23	43	86
5	Eastern Region	13	25	55	93
6	Tribhuvan Army Club	9	7	12	28
7	Far-Western Region	8	18	41	67
8	Mid-Western Region	7	20	46	73
9	People's Liberation Army	0	1	5	6
Total (9 teams)		187	185	272	644

2009 National Games medal table (Open category)
Rank	Team	Gold	Silver	Bronze	Total
1	Central Region*	52	44	53	149
2	Armed Police Force Club	12	6	6	24
3	Nepal Police Club	11	0	2	13
4	Tribhuvan Army Club	9	10	10	29
5	Western Region	6	9	16	31
6	Far-Western Region	3	10	7	20
7	Eastern Region	1	10	7	18
8	Mid-Western Region	0	5	9	14
9	People's Liberation Army	0	0	0	0
Total (9 teams)		94	94	110	298
