= Manish Timsina =

Nepalese footballer

Personal information
- Date of birth: 20 June 1988 (age 38)
- Place of birth: Biratnagar, Nepal

Senior career*
| Years | Team | Apps | (Gls) |
- Eastern Development Region
- Swayambhu Club
- Bansbari Club
- Brigade Boys Club
- Himalayan Sherpa Club
- Ranipokhari Corner Team
- Three Star Club

Managerial career
- 2018: Nepal u15
- 2023: Manang Marshyangdi Club
- 2021 – 2024: Gokulam Kerala
- 2024: Nepal U23
- 2024: Nepal
- 2024 – 2025: Punjab
- 2025–: Afghanistan
- * Club domestic league appearances and goals

Manish Timsina (born 20 June 1988) is a Nepali Football coach and former professional goalkeeper. His the first Nepali to obtain the AFC Goalkeeping "A" Diploma License and the first Nepali to serve as a goalkeeping coach for a foreign national team. As of 2025, he is the goalkeeping coach of the Afghanistan national football team and Punjab FC in India.

== Early life and playing career ==
Timsina was born in Biratnagar, Nepal. He began his football career as a goalkeeper and played for several clubs in Nepal, including Three Star Club, Ranipokhari Corner Team (RCT) and Himalayan Sherpa Club. He also represented Eastern Development Region (now Koshi Province) in the 5th National Games of Nepal, where he won a gold medal.

== Coaching career ==
AFC Goalkeeping License In January 2024, Timsina became the first Nepali to earn the AFC Goalkeeping "A" Diploma License, the highest certification for goalkeeping coaches in Asia. He completed the course under the Malaysian Football Association.

He has worked under several prominent coaches, including Vincenzo Alberto Annese, Domingo Oramas, Francesc Bonet, and Richard Towa.

== Legacy and impact ==
Timsina is widely regarded as a pioneer in Nepali football coaching, particularly in the specialized field of goalkeeping. His international appointments and AFC certification have set new benchmarks for Nepali coaches. He has publicly advocated for improved youth development and goalkeeping infrastructure in Nepal.

== See also ==
- Nepal national football team
- All Nepal Football Association (ANFA)
