= 1982 National Games of Nepal =

Sports event in Nepal

1st National Games of Nepal
- Host city: Kathmandu
- Country: Kingdom of Nepal
- Teams: 14
- Athletes: 1,543
- Sport: 16
- Opening: 11 September 1982
- Closing: 19 September 1982
- Opened by: King Birendra Bir Bikram Shah Dev
- Main venue: Dasarath Rangasala, Kathmandu

The 1982 National Games of Nepal, also known as the 1st National Games of Nepal was a national multi-sport event, held from 11 to 19 September 1982 in Kathmandu, Bagmati Zone. It was a innagural edition of the National Games of Nepal, and was officially innagurated by King Birendra and Queen Aishwarya in Dasarath Rangasala in 11 September 1982.

== Venues ==
- Dasarath Rangasala

== Participating teams ==
Teams from all 14 Zones participated in the 1st National Games of Nepal.

- Mechi Zone
- Kosi Zone
- Sagarmatha Zone
- Janakpur Zone
- Narayani Zone
- Bagmati Zone
- Gandaki Zone
- Dhaulagiri Zone
- Lumbini Zone
- Rapti Zone
- Bheri Zone
- Karnali Zone
- Seti Zone
- Mahakali Zone

== Medal table ==
1982 National Games medal table
| Rank | Zone | Gold | Silver | Bronze | Total |
|---|---|---|---|---|---|
| 1 | Bagmati Zone* | 44 | 33 | 25 | 102 |
| 2 | Gandaki Zone | 8 | 7 | 9 | 24 |
| 3 | Kosi Zone | 6 | 13 | 6 | 25 |
| 4 | Narayani Zone | 5 | 4 | 8 | 17 |
| 5 | Janakpur Zone | 3 | 1 | 2 | 6 |
| 6 | Seti Zone | 3 | 0 | 7 | 10 |
| 7 | Bheri Zone | 2 | 6 | 3 | 11 |
| 8 | Dhaulagiri Zone | 2 | 2 | 1 | 5 |
| 9 | Mahakali Zone | 2 | 2 | 0 | 4 |
| 10 | Lumbini Zone | 2 | 0 | 2 | 4 |
| 11 | Sagarmatha Zone | 1 | 6 | 5 | 12 |
| 12 | Mechi Zone | 0 | 6 | 3 | 9 |
| 13 | Rapti Zone | 0 | 0 | 2 | 2 |
| 14 | Karnali Zone | 0 | 0 | 0 | 0 |
| Total (14 zones) | | 78 | 80 | 73 | 231 |
