= Seti Highway =

Road in Nepal

H15
- सेती राजमार्ग
- Seti Highway
- Seti Highway in red

Route information
- Maintained by MoPIT (Department of Roads)
- Length: 66 km (41 mi)

Major junctions
- From: Amargadhi, Nepal
- To: Dipayal Silgadhi, Nepal

Location
- Country: Nepal

Highway system
- Roads in Nepal
← H14	→ H16

Seti Highway (Nepali: सेती राजमार्ग, also referred to as H15) was a national highway in the western region of Nepal before 2021. This highway linked the towns of Amargadhi, the district headquarter of Dadeldhura, and Dipayal Silgadhi, the district headquarter of Doti.

The Seti Highway (H15) merged with NH03 (Pushpalal Highway) in 2021.
