= 2019 National Games of Nepal =

Sports event

8th National Games of Nepal
- Host city: Nepalgunj, Lumbini
- Country: Nepal
- Motto: Unified Country, Message of Sports एकताबद्ध देश, खेलकुदको सन्देश
- Teams: 11
- Athletes: 5,211
- Sport: 35
- Opening: 18 April 2019
- Closing: 24 April 2019
- Opened by: Nanda Bahadur Pun, (Vice President of Nepal)
- Main venue: Nepalgunj Rangasala, Nepalgunj

The 2019 National Games of Nepal, also known as the 8th National Games of Nepal and informally Lumbini 2019 was a national multi-sport event, held from 18 April 2019 to 24 April 2019 in Nepalgunj, Lumbini Province.

== Venues ==
- Nepalgunj Rangasala

== Participating teams ==
Teams from all 7 Provinces and 3 departmental Clubs of Nepal as well as a team representing Non-Resident Nepali, NRNA.

- Bagmati Province
- Gandaki Province
- Karnali Province
- Koshi Province
- Lumbini Province
- Madhesh Province
- Nepal Armed Police Force Club
- Nepal Army Club
- Nepal Police Club
- Non-Resident Nepali Association (NRNA)
- Sudurpashchim Province

== Medal table ==
2019 National Games medal table
Rank	State	Gold	Silver	Bronze	Total
1	Nepal Army	140	82	67	289
2	Nepal Police Club	62	49	46	157
3	Nepal APF Club	54	69	80	203
4	Bagmati Province	22	40	60	122
5	Gandaki Province (Host)*	12	21	44	77
6	Lumbini Province	11	26	48	85
7	Koshi Province	9	20	59	88
8	Sudurpashchim Province	8	12	34	54
9	Madhesh Province	6	7	20	33
10	Non-Resident Nepali Association	6	2	5	13
11	Karnali Province	3	4	17	24
Totals (11 entries)		333	332	480	1,145
