= Karnali Province Stadium =

Multi-purpose stadium in Nepal

Karnali Province International Stadium
- कर्णाली प्रदेश रङ्गशाला
- Interactive map of Karnali Province International Stadium
- Full name: Karnali Province Stadium
- Location: Surkhet, Nepal
- Coordinates: 28°35′34″N 81°37′19″E
- Elevation: 895 m (2,936 ft)
- Owner: All Nepal Football Association
- Operator: Karnali Sports Development Council
- Capacity: 20,000

Construction
- Built: 2024
- Cost: Rs. 1.594 Billion

Website
- https://sports.karnali.gov.np

The Karnali Province Stadium also known as Surkhet Stadium (Nepali: कर्णाली प्रदेश रङ्गशाला) is a multi-purpose stadium in Surkhet, Karnali Province, Nepal. It has a capacity of 20,000 spectators. This stadium will be Nepal's one of the largest football stadium by capacity.

== History ==
The construction of this stadium began on 21 December 2024 by laying the foundation stone by Province CM Jeevan Bahadur Shahi. The facility comprises a football stadium as per the FIFA Standard, 8 lane athletics synthetic track of 400m, swimming pool, covered hall for games like badminton, karate and other indoor sports, a volleyball court, a basketball court, and TV broadcasting Platform as well as the Olympic Torch Stand.

The administrative buildings of Surkhet district sports office and Karnali Sports Development Council are located here.

The construction of Stadium only begin after the conclusion of 9th National Games in Pokhara.

== Hosted events ==
International games:

Football:

- 10th National Games of Nepal

== See also ==
- Football in Nepal
- List of football stadiums in Nepal
