= Argus Building =

Building in Melbourne, Victoria

Coordinates: 37.8101°S 144.9610°E

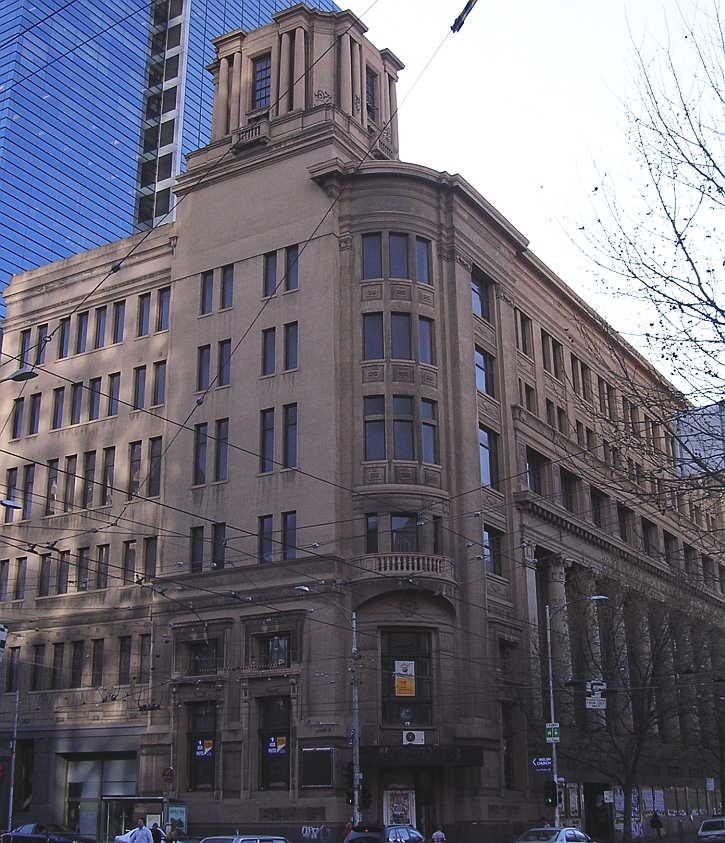
The Argus Building, designed by Godfrey & Spowers, opened in 1926 on La Trobe Street as the newspaper's headquarters.

The Argus Building on the corner of La Trobe and Elizabeth streets in Melbourne, Australia, is notable as the former premises of The Argus newspaper for 30 years (1926–1956). It is classified by the National Trust and is listed on the Victorian Heritage Register. In 2012 it was assessed as one of Australia's top ten endangered heritage buildings. As of October 2016 it is the Melbourne campus of the Melbourne Institute of Technology.

== History ==
An 1855 map shows St John's church and school at this location. Documents from 1880 and 1905 show an enlarged church and a row of two-storey shops along Elizabeth Street.

The site was acquired by the publishers of The Argus and The Australasian for the development of a six-storey purpose-built building to accommodate the numerous workers and massive composing and printing plant deployed in producing high-circulation letterpress newspapers, as expounded in a special supplement, "Entering the New Home", published on 9 September 1926.

After twenty years of financial losses, the last issue of The Argus emerged from the building on Saturday 19 January 1957. After the paper's closure, It was announced that the company's other activities would continue, including The Australasian Post, Your Garden and other operations in radio and commercial printing.

In 2004 La Trobe University bought the Argus Building for $8 million with the intention to redevelop the building to house its legal and business schools as well as a ground-floor shopping precinct. Owing to the high estimated cost of renovating the building, La Trobe University sold the site for $15 million in 2010 to Shesh Ghale, owner of the Melbourne Institute of Technology, who converted the site into its Melbourne campus which re-opened in October 2016.
