= Jiba Lamichhane =

- जीवा लामिछाने
- Born: 13 February 1967 (age 59); Padampur, Chitwan, Nepal
- Education: Moscow State University
- Occupation: Entrepreneur
- Spouse: Dr. Bindita Pokharel
- Children: 2

Jiba Lamichhane (Nepali: जीवा लामिछाने) is an entrepreneur and former president of International Coordination Council (ICC) of Non Resident Nepali Association (NRNA). He was one of the founder members of NRNA (Non Resident Nepali Association).

== Education ==
He graduated with a MSc in Civil Engineering from Moscow State University in Moscow, Russia.

== Award ==
He was awarded “Prawal Janasewshree”, one of the highest states of honor in Nepal, by the President of Nepal Dr Ram Baran Yadav for his outstanding contribution to Nepal and Nepali Diaspora.

== Bibliography ==
He has published a travel memoir ‘Sarsarti Sansaar’.

== See also ==
- Shesh Ghale
