= Melbourne Institute of Technology =

College in Melbourne, Australia

Coordinates: 37°48′36.1″S 144°57′39″E

- Motto: Practical Excellence
- Type: Private Higher Education Provider
- Established: 1996
- Administrative staff: 500 (October 2020)
- Students: 4,000 (March 2020)
- Location: Melbourne, Victoria, Australia
- Campus: Urban (Melbourne & Sydney)
- Colours: Red & white
- Nickname: MIT
- Website: mit.edu.au

The Melbourne Institute of Technology (MIT) is a private tertiary educational institution catering to local and international students in Australia at campuses in Melbourne and Sydney. It has a NEAS-accredited English Language Centre and offers undergraduate and postgraduate courses in business, accounting, management, marketing, information technology, data analytics, research, software engineering, computer networking and telecommunications engineering.

== History ==
Founded in 1996 by Nepali-Australian Businessman Shesh Ghale and his wife Jamuna Gurung, Melbourne Institute of Technology initially offered diploma-level courses in business, information technology and English from its Melbourne campus. In partnership with the University of New England, in 2003 MIT opened a Sydney campus offering UNE courses. In October 2016, a new Melbourne campus was opened in the historic Argus Building.

== Governance ==
Melbourne Institute of Technology is governed by a board of directors which is responsible for overseeing the higher education operations and the general direction and superintendence of the institute. As of April 2021 the board chair is former Federation University Deputy Vice-Chancellor Emeritus Professor Wayne Robinson. The board of directors delegates responsibility for the management of MIT's operations to the appointed CEO. As of April 2021 the CEO is co-founder Shesh Ghale.

== Partnership with Federation University ==
Melbourne Institute of Technology is an affiliated institute of the Federation University Australia and offers a range of FedUni undergraduate and postgraduate programs at its Melbourne and Sydney campuses. The partnership between the FedUni and MIT involves FedUni controlling the quality of the courses and conferring the qualifications, whilst MIT provides the facilities, lecturers, tutors and student services. All academic staff at MIT are approved to teach by FedUni. Students enrolled in FedUni courses at MIT attend as FedUni-enrolled students. Upon successful completion they are awarded FedUni degrees. Students can undertake FedUni undergraduate and postgraduate degrees at MIT in:

- Bachelor of Commerce (Accounting) - Teachout
- Bachelor of Professional Accounting
- Bachelor of Information Technology (Business Information Systems)
- Bachelor of Information Technology
- Bachelor of Business (Management)
- Graduate Diploma of Professional Accounting
- Graduate Diploma of Management
- Graduate Diploma of Technology (Enterprise Systems & Business Analytics)
- Graduate Diploma of Technology (Software Engineering)
- Master of Business Administration (MM9) - Teachout
- Master of Business Administration (International Business)
- Master of Professional Accounting
- Master of Technology (Software Engineering)
- Master of Technology (Enterprise Systems & Business Analytics)

== University goal ==
In October 2020, CEO Shesh Ghale announced that it was MIT's goal to transition to university status in its own right within five years.
