= Prashna Shakya =

Nepali pop singer

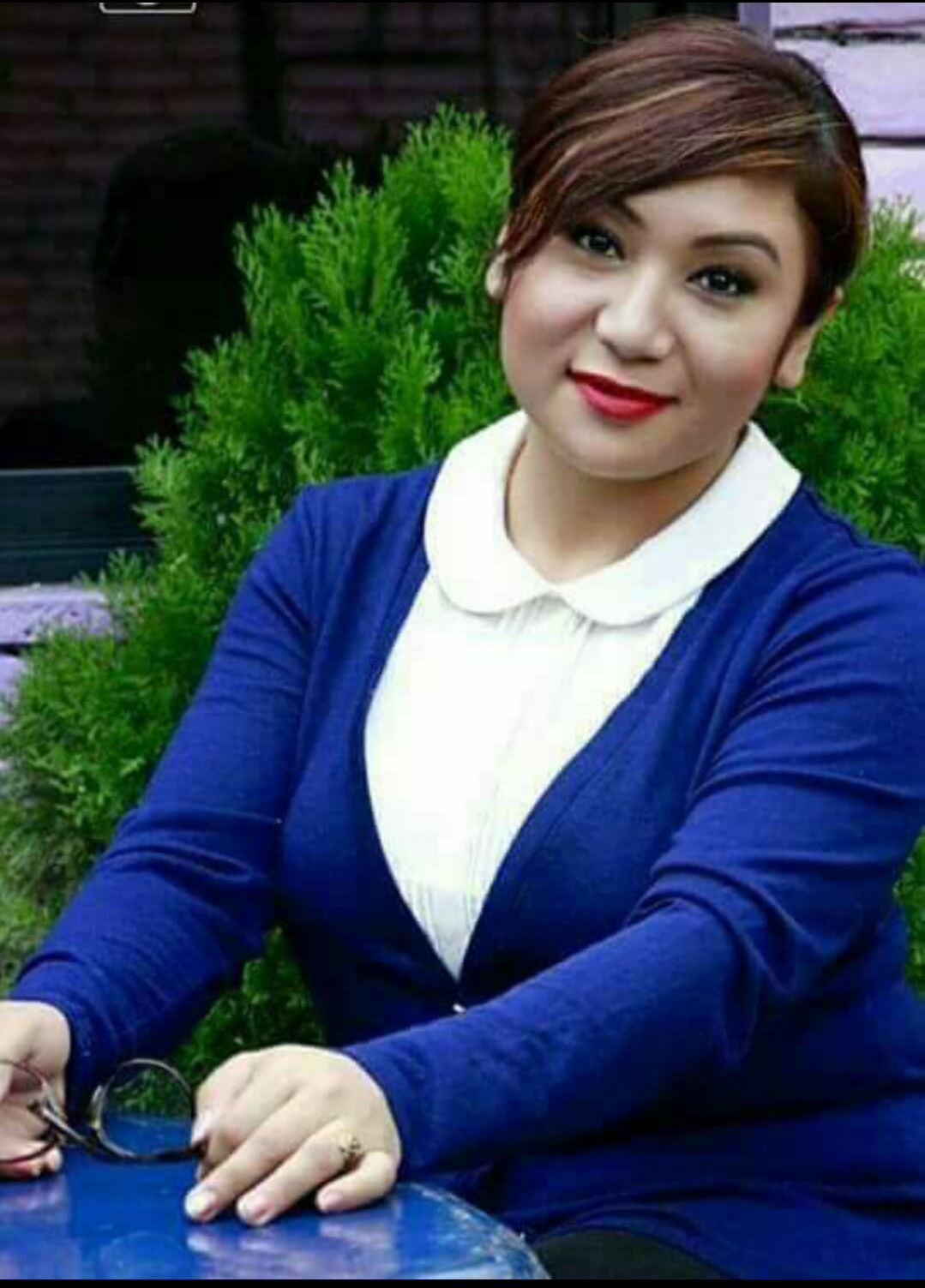
- Born: April 26; Dharan, Nepal
- Style: Pop music
- Spouse: Araj Keshav (2009-2015)

Prashna Shakya is a Nepali pop singer. In 2003, Hits FM awarded her Best Pop Performance Female.

== Early life and education ==
Prashna Shakya was born in Dharan, Nepal. Her parents are Sumitra and Binod Shakya. She has a sister and brother. When she was a teenager, her parents wanted her to pursue sports in school. Shakya preferred music and performed at school and began taking music lessons, including studying under Dibya Khaling. She participated in a singing contest by Radio Nepal and was named a finalist.

== Career ==
Shakya released her first album, Hi! Hello, in 1997. Her second album, Aaawaz, was released in 2003. She was awarded the title "Best Pop Performance Female" by Hits FM.

In 2015, Shakya released the song Mutu. Shakya, alongside Sumit Kadka, performed the theme song for the 2016 National Games of Nepal. In 2017, Shakya performed on behalf of the Embassy of Nepal, alongside Anand Karki, at the Pakistan National Council of Arts.

== Albums ==
- Hi! Hello (1997)
- Aaawaz (2003)
- Udayan (2008)
- Prashna (2015)

== Awards and nominations ==
- Timro Sur Mero Geet 2056 BS: Competition Winner
- Hits FM Music Award 2003: Best Pop Performance Female (WINNER)
- 11th Yamaha Kalika FM Music Award 2071 BS: Best Pop Singer Female (WINNER)
- 2nd Video Award in UAE, Abu Dhabi 2017 AD: Best Female Singer (WINNER)
- 7th Musical Khabar Music Award 2075 BS: Best Modern Female Singer for the song Kaidi Banau (WINNER)
- Bindabasini Award 2075: Best Singer of the Year Female Modern (WINNER)

== Personal life ==
Shakya married film director and singer Araj Keshav in 2009. The relationship ended in divorce in 2015.
