= 1984 National Games of Nepal =

Sports event

2nd National Games of Nepal
- Host city: Pokhara
- Country: Kingdom of Nepal
- Teams: 14
- Athletes: 2,507
- Sport: 19
- Opened by: King Birendra Bir Bikram Shah Dev
- Main venue: Pokhara Rangasala, Pokhara

The 1984 National Games of Nepal, also known as the 2nd National Games of Nepal was a national multi-sport event, held in Pokhara, Gandaki Zone.

== Venues ==
- Pokhara Rangasala

== Participating teams ==
Teams from all 14 Zones participated in this edition of National Games of Nepal.

- Mechi Zone
- Kosi Zone
- Sagarmatha Zone
- Janakpur Zone
- Narayani Zone
- Bagmati Zone
- Gandaki Zone
- Dhaulagiri Zone
- Lumbini Zone
- Rapti Zone
- Bheri Zone
- Karnali Zone
- Seti Zone
- Mahakali Zone

== Medal table ==
1984 National Games medal table
Rank	Zone	Gold	Silver	Bronze	Total
1	Bagmati Zone	55	33	25	108
2	Gandaki Zone*	21	7	9	37
3	Kosi Zone	18	13	6	37
4	Bheri Zone	7	4	2	13
5	Narayani Zone	5	10	13	28
6	Mechi Zone	5	7	7	19
7	Dhaulagiri Zone	5	0	6	11
8	Sagarmatha Zone	4	5	6	15
9	Janakpur Zone	2	4	7	13
10	Lumbini Zone	1	5	8	14
11	Mahakali Zone	1	1	2	4
12	Seti Zone	0	3	3	6
13	Rapti Zone	0	0	1	1
13	Karnali Zone	0	0	1	1
Total (14 zones)		124	92	96	307
