= National Highway 69 (Nepal) =

Highway in Nepal

Waling–Chapakot–Gajarkot Highway वालिङ-चापाकोट-गाजरकोट राजमार्ग
- राष्ट्रिय राजमार्ग ६९
- National Highway 69
- NH69 in red

Route information
- Maintained by MoPIT (Department of Roads)
- Length: 41.47 km (25.77 mi)

Major junctions
- East end: Gajarkot
- West end: Mirdi, Walling

Location
- Country: Nepal
- Provinces: Gandaki Province
- Districts: Syangja District

Highway system
- Roads in Nepal
← NH68	→ NH70

National Highway 69 (NH69) is a national highway in Nepal located in Gandaki province. The total length of the highway is 41.47 kilometres (25.77 mi)

The road is paved up to Chapakot Municipality Five crore Nepali Rupees has been allocated to construct the Jagatbhanjyang-Kewre, Chapakot-Gajarkot road section. The track of this road was opened in 1994/95 (2051/052 BS)
