= Panchkoshi Highway =

Highway in Nepal

Panchkoshi Highway पञ्चकोशी राजमार्ग
- राष्ट्रिय राजमार्ग ६०
- National Highway 60
- NH60 in red
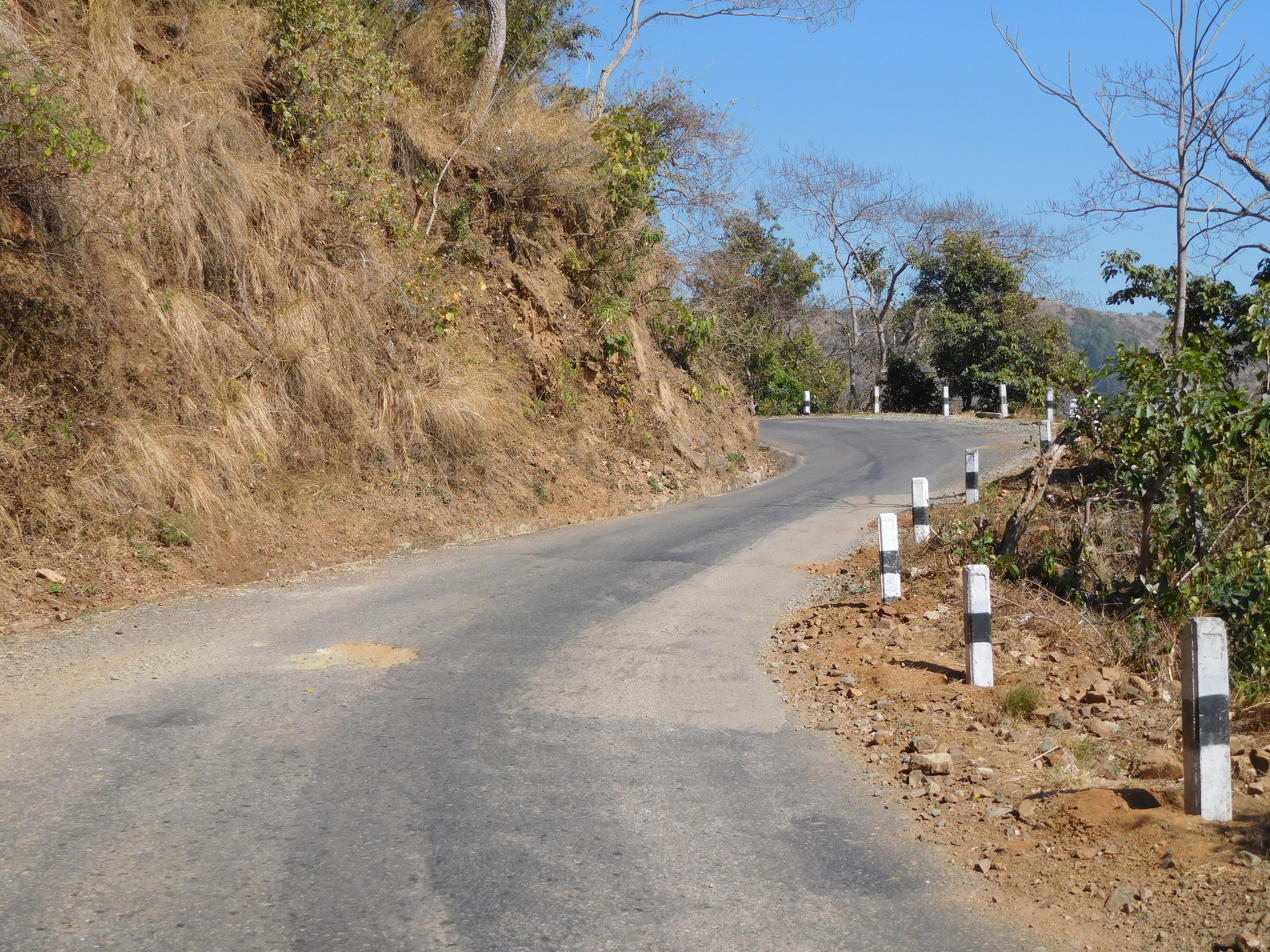
- NH60 in Dailekh

Route information
- Maintained by MoPIT (Department of Roads)
- Length: 288.23 km (179.10 mi)

Major junctions
- North end: Nakchelagna
- Duikhamba, Pallo Kalimati
- Sourh end: Surkhet

Location
- Country: Nepal
- Provinces: Karnali Province
- Districts: Surkhet District, Dailekh District, Kalikot District, Jumla District and Mugu District

Highway system
- Roads in Nepal
← NH59	→ NH61

Panchkoshi Highway (National Highway 60, NH60) is a proposed national highway in Nepal which is being constructed in Karnali Province. The total length of the highway is supposed to be 288.23 kilometres (179.10 mi). According to SNH2020-21 125.67 kilometres (78.09 mi) of the road has already been opened and 60.67 km (37.70 mi) of the road has been paved.

The Highway NH59 named Panchkoshi after The Panchkoshi pilgrimage sites located in Dailekh District. The highway will link the southern part of the country with Nankche-Nagla (Nepa-China border).

The highway is mainly divided into 4 sections:

1. Surkhet – Dailekh road
2. Dailekh - Odhari road
3. Nagma - Gamgadhi road
4. Gamgadhi – Nakchelagna road

The 67-km road linking Dailekh to the mid-western hub of Surkhet has been in a miserable condition ever since it was opened in 1993. The Gamgadhi-Nakchelagna road construction project that was started in the fiscal year 2072–73 BS (2015–16) has reported the construction of just an 18-kilometre section. However, its detailed survey was concluded a decade earlier in 2062–63 BS.

== Gallery ==
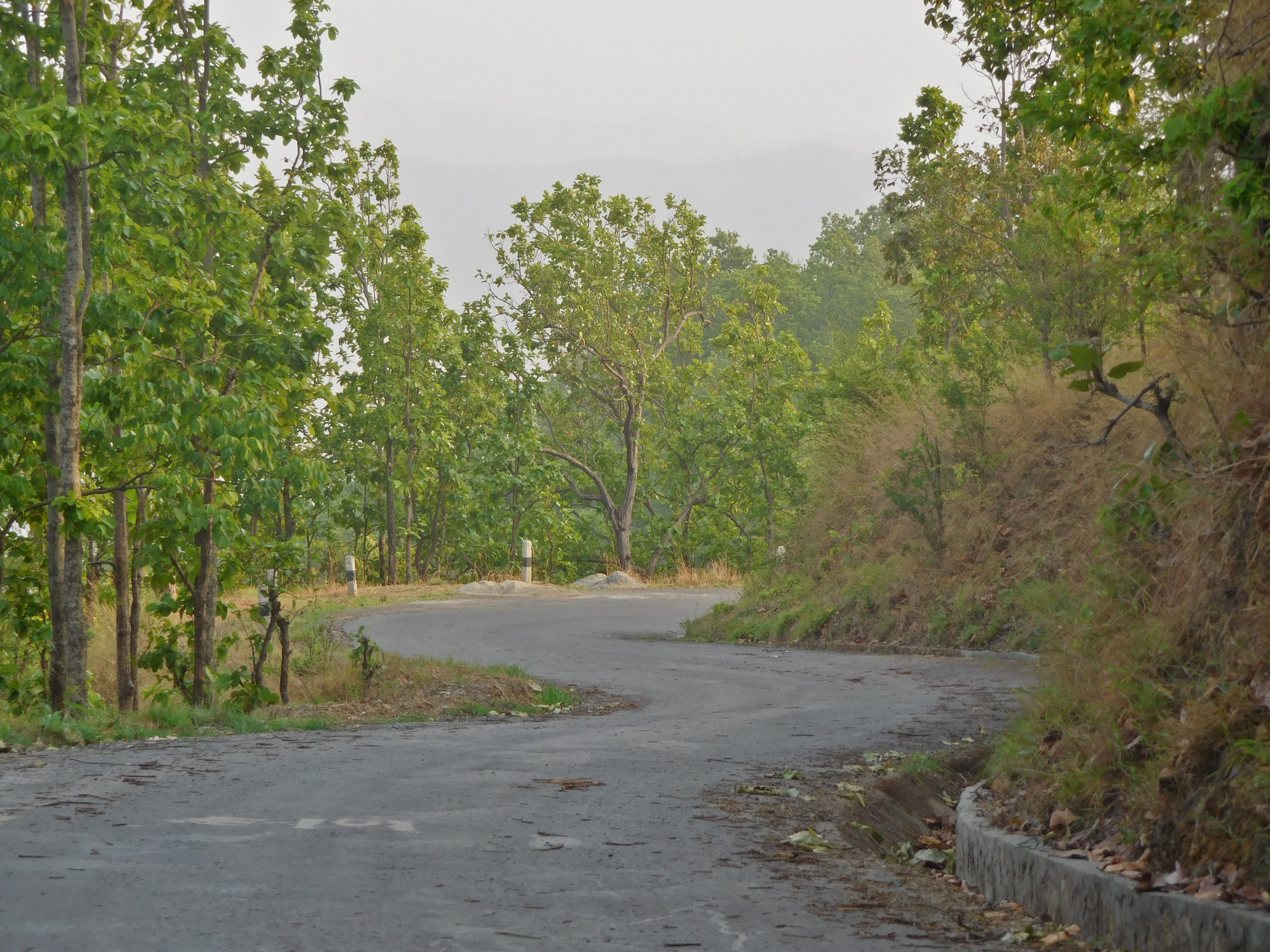
NH60 in Dailekh

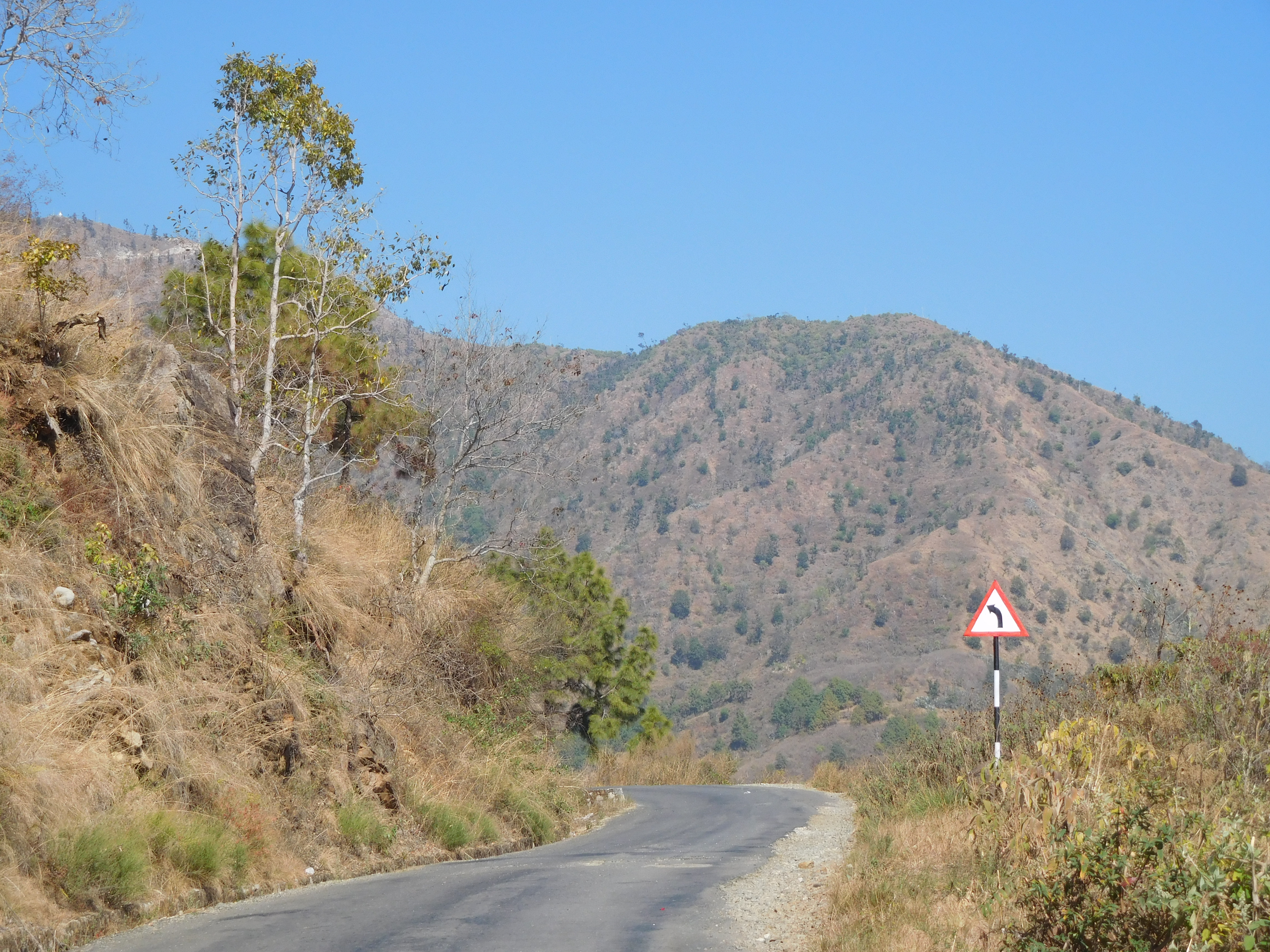
NH60 at mighty hills of Dailekh
