= National Highway 70 (Nepal) =

Highway in Nepal

Seti Dovan–Panchmul–Deurali Highway सेती दोभान-पञ्चमूल-देउराली राजमार्ग
- राष्ट्रिय राजमार्ग ७०
- National Highway 70
- NH70 in red

Route information
- Maintained by MoPIT (Department of Roads)
- Length: 52.31 km (32.50 mi)
- History: Feeder Road F185

Major junctions
- East end: Putalibazar
- Karkineta
- West end: Kushma

Location
- Country: Nepal
- Provinces: Gandaki Province
- Districts: Syangja District, Parbat District

Highway system
- Roads in Nepal
← NH69	→ NH71

National Highway 70 (NH70) is a national highway in Nepal located in Gandaki province. The total length of the highway is 52.31 kilometres (32.50 mi)

Setidovan–Bejang–Panchamool–Aruchaur–Ghante Deurali Road Syangja (NH70) has been allocated Rs 40 million for upgrades.
