= National Highway 59 (Nepal) =

Highway in Nepal

Murtiya-Surkhet-Nagma Highway मूर्तिया-सुर्खेत-नाग्मा राजमार्ग
- राष्ट्रिय राजमार्ग ५९
- National Highway 59
- NH59 in red

Route information
- Maintained by MoPIT (Department of Roads)
- Length: 187.91 km (116.76 mi)

Location
- Country: Nepal
- Provinces: Karnali Province, Lumbini Province
- Districts: Bardiya District, Surkhet District, Dailekh District, Kalikot District

Highway system
- Roads in Nepal
← NH58	→ NH60

National Highway 59, NH59 is a proposed national highway in Nepal which is being constructed in Karnali Province. The total length of the highway is supposed to be 187.91 kilometres (116.76 mi). According to SNH2020-21 53.74 kilometres (33.39 mi) of the road has already been opened and 33.74 km (20.97 mi) of the road has been paved.

NH59 in detail
Sections	Length	Status
Murtiya - Gulariya	3 km (1.86 mi)	paved
Gulariya - Rammapur	22 km (13.67 mi)	paved
Bhurigau - Telpani	21 km (13.05 mi)	uc
Telpani - Bangesimal	31 km (19.26 mi)	uc
Bangesimal - Lekhfarha	16.84 km (10.46 mi)	uc
Mathilo Dungeswor - Puraini	10.52 km (6.54 mi)	uc
Puraini - Taraghat	7.74 km (4.81 mi)	paved
Taraghat - Mahabudham	19.81 km (12.31 mi)	uc
Mahabudham - Talsera	24.2 km (15.04 mi)	uc

The 51-km Bhuri Gaun-Telpani road (Bhurigau-Telpani-Bangesimal), linking Birendranagar, the provincial capital of Karnali Province, to Bhuri Gaun in Bardiya District of Lumbini Province was opened in 1968 but never paved. The route was not so important for people as it passes through jungle of Bardiya National Park. Also the park authorities had banned construction of a road inside the park but after interfere of apex court the upgradation of road is going to take place.

The federal government has earmarked Rs. 200 million for the Mahabu road section of the district headquarters. the road connecting Kalikot and Jumla via Surkhet-Upper Dugeshwor, Dullu-Bhairabi-Kalikot and Jumla is being built by the Provincial and the Central governments.
