= National Highway 68 (Nepal) =

Highway in Nepal

Bhimkali Highway भीमकाली राजमार्ग
- राष्ट्रिय राजमार्ग ६८
- National Highway 68
- NH68 in red

Route information
- Maintained by MoPIT (Department of Roads)
- Length: 83.10 km (51.64 mi)

Major junctions
- North end: Bhimad
- Sourh end: Arunkhola

Location
- Country: Nepal
- Provinces: Gandaki Province, Lumbini Province
- Districts: Tanahun District, Syangja District, Palpa District, Nawalparasi East District

Highway system
- Roads in Nepal
← NH67	→ NH69

National Highway 68 (NH68) is a proposed national highway in Nepal located in Gandaki and Lumbini Provinces of Nepal. The total length of the highway is 83.10 kilometres (51.64 mi) in which 10.17 km (6.32 mi) of the track has been opened.

The provincial government, in collaboration with the central government, has allocated a budget of 16 crore 20 lakhs to continue the projects of Greater Pokhara Ring Road, Bhimad-Dedhgaon-Arunkhola Road, Shaligram Corridor and Arughat-Sirdibas-Ruila Bhanjyang. Lack of quality and irregularities in the work by the contractor is the main reason for not finishing work on time. Local people have demanded action against the contractor.
