= Doti Airport =

- IATA: SIH; ICAO: VNDT

Summary
- Airport type: Public
- Owner: Government of Nepal
- Operator: Civil Aviation Authority of Nepal
- Serves: Dipayal Silgadhi, Nepal
- Elevation AMSL: 1,893 ft / 577 m
- Coordinates: 29°15′47″N 80°56′10″E

Map
- Location of airport in Nepal

Runways
| Direction | Length | | Surface |
| Direction | m | ft | Surface |
|---|---|---|---|
| 14/32 | 490 | 1,608 | Asphalt |

Doti Airport (IATA: SIH, ICAO: VNDT), also known as Silgadhi Airport, is a domestic airport located in Dipayal Silgadhi serving Doti District, a district in Sudurpashchim Province in Nepal.

== History ==
The airport started operations on 24 September 1973, but the runway was only blacktopped and upgraded in 2020 for Nepalese Rupees 50 million. It was reinaugurated on 3 October 2020. Scheduled flights to Dhangadhi started in 2022.

== Facilities ==
The airport resides at an elevation of 1,893 feet (577 m) above mean sea level. It has one runway which is 490 metres (1,608 ft) in length.

== Airlines and destinations ==
| Airlines | Destinations |
|---|---|
| Nepal Airlines | Dhangadhi |

== See also ==
List of airports in Nepal
