= National Highway 61 (Nepal) =

Highway in Nepal

Jumla-Dungeshwar Highway जुम्ला-डुंगेश्वर राजमार्ग
- राष्ट्रिय राजमार्ग ६१
- National Highway 61
- NH61 in red

Route information
- Maintained by MoPIT (Department of Roads)
- Length: 164.62 km (102.29 mi)

Major junctions
- North end: Jumla
- Ghiyatidu, Chagatra Bazar, Khidki Jyula, Khulalu, Nagma-NH60
- Sourh end: Lower Dungeshwor

Location
- Country: Nepal
- Provinces: Karnali Province
- Districts: Dailekh District, Kalikot District, Jumla District

Highway system
- Roads in Nepal
← NH60	→ NH62

National Highway 61, NH61 is a proposed national highway in Nepal which is being conducted in Karnali Province. The total length of the highway is supposed to be 164.62 kilometres (102.29 mi). According to SNH2020-21 115 kilometres (71 mi) of the road has already been opened and 100 km (62.14 mi) of the road has been paved.

For the financial year 2022/23, 100 million Nepali Rupees have been allocated for the "Lower Dungeshwar-Satkhamba-Dullu Peepleboat road"
