= Seti Corridor =

Highway in Nepal

Seti Corridor सेती करिडोर
- राष्ट्रिय राजमार्ग ६५
- National Highway 65
- NH65 in red

Route information
- Maintained by MoPIT (Department of Roads)
- Length: 304.94 km (189.48 mi)

Major junctions
- North end: Uraibhanjyang
- Sourh end: Khutiya

Location
- Country: Nepal
- Provinces: Sudur Province
- Districts: Kailali District, Doti District, Bajhang District

Highway system
- Roads in Nepal
← NH64	→ NH66

National Highway 65, NH65 is a proposed national highway in Nepal, located in Sudurpashchim Province. The total length of the highway is 304.94 kilometres (189.48 mi) of which 64 km (39.77 mi) has been opened.

== Background ==
The project to construct a road from Khutiya to Dipayal as an expressway was inaugurated on 16 December 2015. The road was supposed to be 96 km (59.65 mi) expressway. Delays by the contractor, controversies over the forest, disputes between the federal and provincial governments over the jurisdiction, and other reasons has left the project in limbo. On the other hand, the road project from Chainpur to Urai Bhanjyang (Nepal-China border) was separately established as North Seti Highway while the road project from Chainpur to Khakraula (Indo-Nepal border) was established as South Seti Highway. Later, South Seti became (NH62) and North Seti Highway merged with Khutiya–Dipayal Expressway and became NH65.
