= National Highway 63 (Nepal) =

Highway in Nepal

Sanfebagar-Martadi Highway साँफेबगर-मार्तडी राजमार्ग
- राष्ट्रिय राजमार्ग ६३
- National Highway 63
- NH63 in red

Route information
- Maintained by MoPIT (Department of Roads)
- Length: 55.24 km (34.32 mi)

Major junctions
- North end: Martadi
- Sourh end: Sanfebagar

Location
- Country: Nepal
- Provinces: Sudur Province
- Districts: Achham District, Bajura District

Highway system
- Roads in Nepal
← NH62	→ NH64

National Highway 63, NH63 is a national highway in Nepal located in Sudurpashchim Province. The total length of the highway is 55.24 kilometres (34.32 mi). There is a plan to extend the road by another 55 km from Martadi to Okhartola. 42 km (26.10 mi) track from Martadi to Kolti has already been opened.
