= Jamuna Gurung (entrepreneur) =

Australian Businesswomen

- जमुना गुरुङ
- Born: Nepal
- Education: Swinburne University of Technology
- Occupation: Entrepreneur
- Known for: Co-founder, Melbourne Institute of Technology
- Spouse: Shesh Ghale

Jamuna Gurung (Nepali: जमुना गुरुङ) is an Australian businesswomen of Nepalese origin, and is executive director and managing director of the Melbourne Institute of Technology, in Victoria, Australia, which she co-founded with her husband, Shesh Ghale.

Gurung was born in Nepal and came to Australia in 1991 to undertake studies. She completed her Bachelor of Business degree with a focus on Marketing and Management at Swinburne University of Technology.

== Net worth ==
Gurung and her husband, Ghale, were the first billionaires in the global Nepalese diaspora and the only second billionaire of Nepalese origin.

Gurung and Ghale first appeared on the BRW Rich 200 in 2009, and jointly appeared on subsequent rich lists. As of May 2023, the net worth of Gurung and Ghale was assessed by The Australian Financial Review in the 2023 Rich List as approximately A$900 million.

Year	Financial Review Rich List		Forbes Australia's 50 Richest	
Year	Rank	Net worth (A$)^{[note 1]}	Rank	Net worth (US$)
2014		$335 million ▲		
2015	99 ▲	$528 million ▲		
2016	105 ▼	$586 million ▲		
2017	101 ▲	$647 million ▲		
2018	81 ▲	$876 million ▲		
2019	78 ▲	$1.18 billion ▲		
2020	105 ▼	$994 million ▼		
2021	111 ▼	$1.01 billion ▲		
2022	136 ▼	$1.00 billion ▼		
2023	157 ▼	$900 million ▼		

Legend
Icon	Description
Steady	Has not changed from the previous year
▲	Has increased from the previous year
▼	Has decreased from the previous year

=== Note ===
- ^1: Net worth held jointly with Shesh Ghale.
