= Jayaprithvi Highway =

Highway in Nepal

Jayaprithvi Highway जयपृथ्वी राजमार्ग
- राष्ट्रिय राजमार्ग ६४
- National Highway 64
- NH64 in red

Route information
- Maintained by MoPIT (Department of Roads)
- Length: 113.05 km (70.25 mi)

Major junctions
- North end: Chainpur
- Sourh end: Khopde

Location
- Country: Nepal
- Provinces: Sudur Province
- Districts: Baitadi District, Bajhang District

Highway system
- Roads in Nepal
← NH63	→ NH65

Jayaprithvi Highway (National Highway 64, NH64) is a national highway in Nepal located in Sudurpashchim Province. The total length of the highway is 113.05 kilometres (70.25 mi).

The highway named after Jaya Prithvi Bahadur Singh who was a humanist, peace advocate, writer and social activist from Nepal.

The road upgradation work of the 108-km long highway from Khodpe in Baitadi district to Chainpur started last fiscal year in 2020 at the cost of Rs 200 million.
