= National Highway 67 (Nepal) =

Highway in Nepal

Mahakali Corridor महाकाली करिडोर
- राष्ट्रिय राजमार्ग ६७
- National Highway 67
- NH67 in red

Route information
- Maintained by MoPIT (Department of Roads)
- Length: 198.14 km (123.12 mi)

Major junctions
- North end: Datu, Darchula
- Jogbudha, Parshuram
- Sourh end: Gaddachauki, Bhimdatta

Location
- Country: Nepal
- Provinces: Sudur Province
- Districts: Kanchanpur District, Dadeldhura District, Baitadi District, Darchula District

Highway system
- Roads in Nepal
← NH66	→ NH68

National Highway 67 (NH67) is a proposed national highway in Nepal located in Sudurpashchim Province. The total length of the highway is 198.14 kilometres (123.12 mi), of which 25.79 km (16.03 mi) has been opened. The road from Brahmadev (Kanchanpur District) to Dattu (Darchula Khalanga) is marked as National Highway 67.

== Mahakali Corridor ==
NH67 is being constructed under the Mahakali Corridor Project, which is 425 km (264 mi) in total length. The Mahakali Corridor Project includes NH67 (198.14 kilometres [123.12 mi], from Brahmev to Datu) and part of NH66 (from Datu to Tinkar).

The Mahakali Corridor project was proposed in 2015.

Highway	Section	Length
National Highway 66	Dattu–Tinkar	100 km (62.14 mi)
National Highway 67	Brahmdev–Dattu	198.14 km (123.12 mi)
Mahakali Corridor	Brahmdev–Tinkar	??

The Mahakali Corridor is a road project that runs along the Mahakali River in Nepal from Kanchanpur to Darchula. It is intended to improve transportation and regional growth in the Sudurpaschim province. It is about 425 km long.

The corridor connects settlements along the Mahakali River. It passes through the districts of Kanchanpur, Dadeldhura, Baitadi, and Darchula. It aims to connect more than half of the hilly areas of Sudurpaschim with the Terai region.

The project began in fiscal year 2008-9 as the Darchula-Tinkar road project. It was renamed the Mahakali Corridor Road Project in fiscal year 2020-21.

The project includes construction of a 334-km-long road from Brahmadev to Tusarpani of Darchula.

The Nepali Army is opening a 91-km-long track from Tusarpani-Tinkar.
