= Amargadhi =

Place in Nepal

Amargadhi अमरगढी
- Municipality
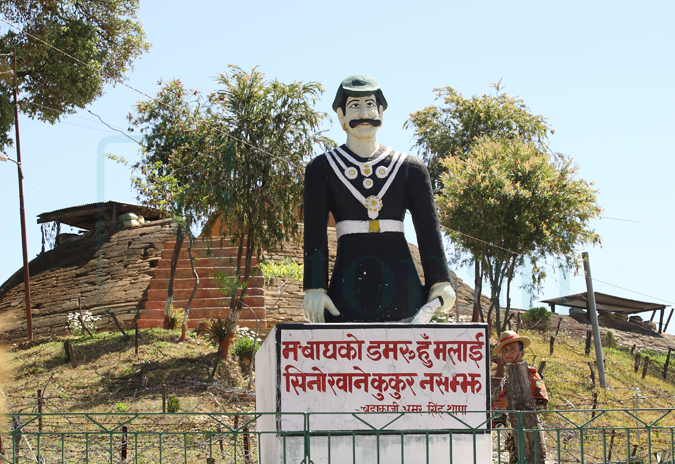
- Statue of Amar Singh Thapa at Amaragadhi Fort

- Location in Nepal
- Coordinates: 29°18′07″N 80°35′19″E
- Country: Nepal
- Province: Sudurpashchim
- District: Dadeldhura
- Incorporated: January 24, 1997

Government
  - Mayor: Dilli Prasad Joshi
  - Deputy Mayor: Parbati Jhukal
- Elevation: 1,848 m (6,063 ft)

Population (2011)
  - Total: 21,245
- Time zone: UTC+5:45 (Nepal Time)
- Postal code: 10300
- Area code: 096
- Website: amargadhimun.gov.np

Amargadhi is a municipality and the district headquarters of Dadeldhura District in Sudurpashchim Province in western Nepal. It was named after Gorkha General Amar Singh Thapa, who fought in the Gurkha War between 1814 and 1816. At the time of the 2011 Nepal census, it had a population of 21,245 people living in 4,778 individual households.

== Transportation ==
Mahakali Highway links Amargadhi to the Terai region of Nepal as well as Api Municipality in the Lesser Himalayas. Seti Highway branches off Mahakali Highway at Amargadhi towards Dipayal Silgadhi.

== Media ==
To promote the local culture, Amargadhi has three community radio stations: Radio Amargadhi – 97.4 MHz, Radio Sudur Awaz – 95 MHz, and Radio Aafno – 104.8 MHz.

== Ghatal Temple ==
Ghatal Temple is a significant Hindu pilgrimage site located in Amargadhi Municipality-3, Sudurpaschim Province. The temple is dedicated to Ghatal Baba, a revered deity with deep local significance. Every year, the temple attracts thousands of devotees, especially during the Ghatal Devta Jatra (fair), which is celebrated with great enthusiasm. The fair involves various traditional rituals and processions, showcasing the region’s cultural and spiritual heritage.

The temple is historically linked to the Malla kings of Doti, with a local legend suggesting that Ghatal Baba was brought by the seventh queen of King Nagi Malla. Today, Ghatal Temple continues to serve as a vital center of worship and community gathering, playing a crucial role in the cultural identity of Amargadhi.

== Climate ==
Climate data for Amargadhi (Dadeldhura District), elevation 1,879 m (6,165 ft), (1991–2020 normals, extremes 1978–present)
Month	Jan	Feb	Mar	Apr	May	Jun	Jul	Aug	Sep	Oct	Nov	Dec	Year
Record high °C (°F)	25.5 (77.9)	25.5 (77.9)	33.3 (91.9)	33.5 (92.3)	32.3 (90.1)	34.3 (93.7)	32.4 (90.3)	30.1 (86.2)	28.5 (83.3)	28.8 (83.8)	25.0 (77.0)	25.0 (77.0)	34.3 (93.7)
Mean daily maximum °C (°F)	14.6 (58.3)	16.2 (61.2)	20.4 (68.7)	24.2 (75.6)	26.3 (79.3)	26.4 (79.5)	24.6 (76.3)	24.4 (75.9)	24.3 (75.7)	22.7 (72.9)	19.5 (67.1)	16.6 (61.9)	21.7 (71.1)
Daily mean °C (°F)	9.2 (48.6)	10.7 (51.3)	14.5 (58.1)	18.2 (64.8)	20.5 (68.9)	21.6 (70.9)	21.1 (70.0)	20.9 (69.6)	20.0 (68.0)	17.2 (63.0)	13.7 (56.7)	10.9 (51.6)	16.5 (61.7)
Mean daily minimum °C (°F)	3.7 (38.7)	5.2 (41.4)	8.6 (47.5)	12.2 (54.0)	14.6 (58.3)	16.7 (62.1)	17.5 (63.5)	17.3 (63.1)	15.7 (60.3)	11.7 (53.1)	7.9 (46.2)	5.1 (41.2)	11.3 (52.3)
Record low °C (°F)	−5.0 (23.0)	−2.5 (27.5)	−1.0 (30.2)	3.0 (37.4)	6.8 (44.2)	7.8 (46.0)	8.0 (46.4)	10.8 (51.4)	10.6 (51.1)	1.4 (34.5)	3.0 (37.4)	−4.2 (24.4)	−5.0 (23.0)
Average precipitation mm (inches)	50.4 (1.98)	65.2 (2.57)	50.2 (1.98)	46.2 (1.82)	82.0 (3.23)	183.1 (7.21)	327.8 (12.91)	309.5 (12.19)	183.2 (7.21)	31.7 (1.25)	7.5 (0.30)	13.4 (0.53)	1,350.2 (53.16)
Average precipitation days (≥ 0.1 mm)	4.1	4.6	4.7	6.0	9.2	13.0	20.0	20.5	11.2	1.9	1.0	1.2	97.4
Source 1: Department Of Hydrology and Meteorology
Source 2: NOAA
