= 2022 National Games of Nepal =

Sports event

9th National Games of Nepal
- Host city: Pokhara, Gandaki
- Country: Nepal
- Motto: ‘Unified Country, Message of Sports’
- Edition: 9th
- Teams: 11
- Athletes: 6,102
- Sport: 36
- Opening: 5 June 2022
- Closing: 11 June 2022
- Opened by: Nanda Bahadur Pun, (Vice President of Nepal)
- Main venue: Pokhara Rangasala, Pokhara

The 2022 National Games of Nepal, also known as the 9th National Games of Nepal and informally Gandaki 2022 was a national multi-sport event, held from 5 June 2022 to 11 June 2022 in Pokhara, Gandaki Province, Nepal.

== Venues ==
Among 36 events 9 were held outside the provincial capital Pokhara.

=== Pokhara ===
- Pokhara Stadium
  - Archery Ground
  - Badminton Hall
  - Cricket Ground
  - Multipurpose Covered Hall
  - Old Badminton Hall
  - Squash Hall
  - Semi Covered Hall
  - Tennis Court
- Auditorium Hall, Pokhara
- Bhandardhik Playground, Pokhara
- Exhibition Hall, Pokhara
- Fishtail Academy, Pokhara
- Gandaki Boarding School, Pokhara
- Gaurishankar Sports Ground, Hemza
- Handball Academy, Pokhara
- Himalayan Golf Course, Pokhara
- Industry and Commerce Association, Pokhara
- Kolmabahkot Society Hall, Pokhara
- Lakeside, Pokhara
- PN Campus, Pokhara
- Raniban, Pokhara
- Ranjit Party Palace, Pokhara
- Sarangkot, Pokhara (Paragliding)

=== Kathmandu ===
- TU Cricket Ground, Kirtipur
- Mulpani International Cricket Ground, Mulpani

=== Syanja ===
- Waling Rangasala (women's football)

=== Myagdi ===
- Myagdi Covered Hall (Taekwondo)
- Myagdi Sports Ground (Women's Volleyball)

=== Gorkha ===
- Gorkha (Chess)

=== Nawalpur ===
- Kawasoti, Nawalpur (Wrestling)
- Tharu Museum, Kawasoti, Nawalpur (Sepaktakro)

=== Parbat ===
- Parbat Semi Covered Hall, Kusma

=== Baglung ===
- Baglung Covered Hall, Baglung (ITF Taekwondo)

=== Tanahu ===
- Tanahu

=== Lalitpur ===
- Satdobato Swimming Hall, Satdobato

== Participating teams ==
Teams from all 7 Provinces and 3 departmental clubs of Nepal as well as a team representing Non-Resident Nepali, NRNA participated in the tournament in various sports.

- Bagmati Province
- Gandaki Province
- Karnali Province
- Koshi Province
- Lumbini Province
- Madhesh Province
- Nepal A.P.F. Club
- Nepal Army Club
- Nepal Police Club
- NRNA
- Sudurpashchim Province

== Sports ==
36 disciplines were contested in the 2022 National Games.

9th National Games of Nepal
- Aquatics ()
  - Diving
  - Swimming
  - Water polo
- Archery ()
- Athletics ()
- Badminton ()
- Basketball ()
- Beach sports
  - Beach football ()
  - Beach handball ()
  - Beach volleyball ()
- Bodybuilding ()
- Boxing ()
- Canoeing ()
- Chess ()
- Cricket ()
- Cue sports ()
  - Billiards
  - Snooker
- Cycling ()
- Fencing ()
- Field hockey ()
- Football ()
- Golf ()
  - Lawn golf
- Gymnastics ()
- Handball ()
- Karate ()
  - Full contact karate
- Martial arts
  - ITF Taekwondo
  - Judo ()
  - Taekwondo ()
  - Wushu ()
- Netball ()
- Paragliding ()
- Rugby union ()
- Shooting ()
- Skateboarding ()
- Softball ()
- Soft tennis ()
- Squash ()
- Swimming ()
- Table tennis ()
- Tennis ()
- Traditional sports
  - Kabaddi ()
  - Kho kho ()
  - Sepak takraw ()
- Triathlon ()
- Volleyball ()
- Weightlifting ()
- Wrestling ()

== Medal table ==
2022 National Games medal table
Rank	State	Gold	Silver	Bronze	Total
1	Nepal Army	172	110	89	371
2	Nepal A.P.F. Club	65	73	89	227
3	Nepal Police Club	61	61	73	195
4	Gandaki Province*	32	31	57	120
5	Bagmati Province	24	47	74	145
6	Koshi Province	10	23	50	83
7	Sudurpashchim Province	10	10	43	63
8	NRNA	10	9	7	26
9	Lumbini Province	6	22	40	68
10	Madhesh Province	5	8	26	39
11	Karnali Province	2	4	12	18
Totals (11 entries)		397	398	560	1,355
