= National Highway 62 (Nepal) =

Highway in Nepal

Southern Seti Highway दक्षिणी सेती राजमार्ग
- राष्ट्रिय राजमार्ग ६२
- National Highway 62
- NH62 in red

Route information
- Maintained by MoPIT (Department of Roads)
- Length: 240.98 km (149.74 mi)

Major junctions
- North end: Chainpur
- Sourh end: Khakraula

Location
- Country: Nepal
- Provinces: Sudur Province
- Districts: Kailali District, Doti District, Achham District, Bajura District and Bajhang District

Highway system
- Roads in Nepal
← NH61	→ NH63

National Highway 62, NH62 (Southern Seti Highway) is a proposed national highway in Nepal which is being constructed in Sudurpashchim Province. The total length of the highway is supposed to be 240.98 kilometres (149.74 mi). According to SNH2020-21 70.98 kilometres (44.10 mi) of the road has already been opened and 54.47 km (33.85 mi) of the road has been paved.

The Highway passes through Khakraula (Indo-Nepal border)-Tikapur-Lamki-Lodeghat-Bayalpata, Saphebagar-Chainpur
