= Shesh Ghale =

Australian-Nepali Businessman

- Born: Lamjung, Nepal, 1963
- Education: Kharkiv National Automobile and Highway University; Victoria University
- Occupation: Entrepreneur
- Spouse: Jamuna Gurung

Shesh Ghale is a Nepalese Australian businessman and the former president of Non Resident Nepali Association (NRNA). Based in Melbourne, Victoria, Ghale is the CEO of Melbourne Institute of Technology (MIT), which he co-founded with his wife, Jamuna Gurung.

== Biography ==
Born in the western Nepal village of Lamjung in 1963, Ghale undertook his initial tertiary education in the former USSR (1979 to 1986) graduating with a Master of Civil Engineering degree from the Kharkiv National Automobile and Highway University. He undertook his studies on a Nepalese Government scholarship and, on returning to Nepal, worked as a highway project engineer for the Nepalese Government's transport department. Ghale relocated to Melbourne in 1990 to undertake further studies and to settle his family in Australia. He graduated from Victoria University in 1994 with a Master of Business Administration.

Ghale is the CEO and co-founder of the Melbourne Institute of Technology.
