= List of zones of Nepal =

Former administrative areas of Nepal

Kingdom of Nepal नेपाल अधिराज्य
- Zones of Nepal
- 1961–2015
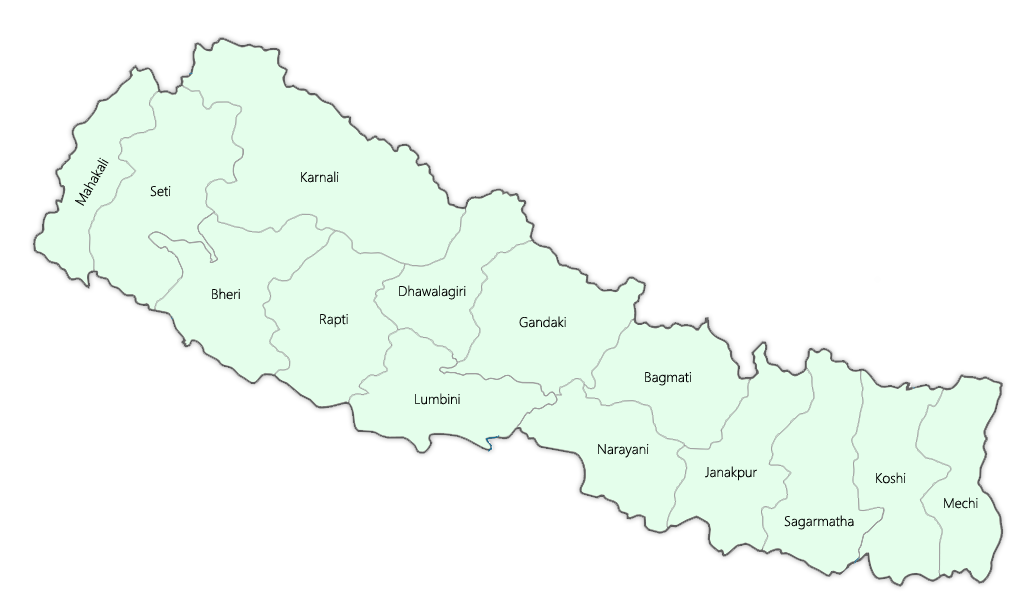
- Former zones
- Capital: Kathmandu
- History
  - Established: 1961
  - Disestablished: 2015

Until the establishment of seven new provinces in 2015, Nepal was divided into 14 administrative zones (Nepali: अञ्चल; anchal) and 75 districts (Nepali: जिल्ला; jillā). The 14 administrative zones were grouped into five development regions (Nepali: विकास क्षेत्र; vikās kṣetra). Each district was headed by a chief district officer (CDO), who was responsible for maintaining law and order and coordinating the work of field agencies of the various government ministries.

== List ==
From east to west:

- Eastern Development Region:
  - Mechi Zone, named after the Mechi River
  - Kosi Zone, named after the Kosi River
  - Sagarmatha Zone, named after Sagarmatha (Mount Everest)
- Central Development Region:
  - Janakpur Zone, named after holy city Janakpur
  - Bagmati Zone, named after the Bagmati River
  - Narayani Zone, named after the Narayani (lower Gandaki) River
- Western Development Region:
  - Gandaki Zone, named after the Gandaki River
  - Lumbini Zone, named after Lumbini, a pilgrimage site, birthplace of Gautama Buddha
  - Dhaulagiri Zone, named after Dhaulagiri mountain
- Mid-Western Development Region:
  - Rapti Zone, named after the West Rapti River
  - Karnali Zone, named after the Karnali River
  - Bheri Zone, named after the Bheri River
- Far-Western Development Region:
  - Seti Zone, named after the Seti River
  - Mahakali Zone, named after the Mahakali River

== Clickable map ==
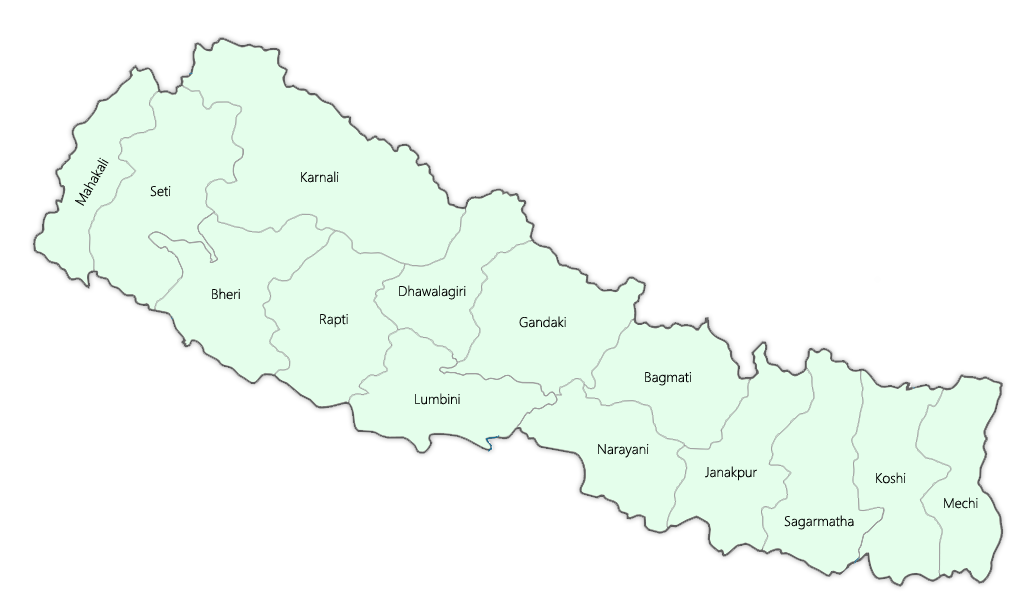
Districts of Nepal

== See also ==
- Development Regions of Nepal (former)
- List of districts of Nepal
- List of village development committees of Nepal (former)
- ISO 3166-2:NP
