= Mahakali Highway =

Road in Nepal

Mahakali Highway महाकाली राजमार्ग
- राष्ट्रिय राजमार्ग ६६
- National Highway 66
- NH66 in red

Route information
- Maintained by MoPIT (Department of Roads)
- Length: 364.94 km (226.76 mi)

Major junctions
- From: Mahakali Khalanga
- To: Dhangadhi

Location
- Country: Nepal
- Provinces: Sudurpashchim
- Districts: Kailali District, Doti District, Dadeldhura District, Baitadi District, Darchula District
- Primary destinations: Patan Municipality, Amargadhi

Highway system
- Roads in Nepal
← NH65	→ NH67

Mahakali Highway (National Highway 66, NH66) is a National Highway of Nepal located in Sudur Province. The total length of the highway is 364.93 km (226.76 mi), in which 234.93 km (145.98 mi) of the road has been paved.

== History ==
Mahakali Highway formerly was a 325 km (201.95 mi) long Highway with the old number H14 connecting Dhangadhi of Kailali District (Western Terai region) to Mahakali Municipality of Darchula District (Lesser Himalayas) passing through Doti District, Dadeldhura District and Baitadi District. The road from Syaule (Dadeldhura) to Satbanj (Darchula) was built with the assistance of USA between 1967 and 1985.

On the closure of roads from Darchula to India by the Indian side on various excuses, Nepal decided to extend the road from Darchula Khalanga (Headquarters) to Chhangru and Tinkar (Great Himalayas). Chhangru, Tinkar and Khalanga are all inside Nepali territory, but one has to pass through Indian territory to get from Khalanga to these two villages, as there were no roads or foot trails on the Nepali side. Nepal Army is working to open a track from Tusarpani to Tinkar in Darchula district. Around 92 km of dirt track—31 km in Dadeldhura, 34 km in Baitadi and 27 km in Darchula—is yet to be opened.

The extension work of Mahakali Highway, NH66 (from Dattu to Tinkar) is being done under the Mahakali Corridor Project.
