= Non-Resident Nepali Association =

Nepalese diaspora organization

Non Resident Nepali Association
गैरआवासीय नेपाली संघ

Regions with significant populations
- United States: 70,000
- United Kingdom: 50,000

Languages
- Nepali, English

Religion
- Hinduism, Buddhism

The Non Resident Nepali Association (गैर-आवासीय नेपाली संघ) is an association of Non Resident Nepalis (NRN).

== International Coordination Council ==
International Coordination Council (ICC) is the highest global representative executive body of the NRNA and provides overall guidance and directives to the executive committee. Each NCC nominates its members, in a number as prescribed by the NRNA Charter, to represent itself to the ICC. ICC also includes additional members co-opted by the ICC through its meetings. To seek advice on various issues of the NRNs, the ICC also nominates a number of recognized individuals as ICC Advisors.

| Name | Duration | Remarks | Ref. |
|---|---|---|---|
| Dr. Upendra Mahato | (2003–2009) | He was the first president of the ICC. | |
| Mr. Dev Man Hirachan | (2009–2011) | | |
| Mr. Jiba Lamichhane | (2011–2013) | | |
| Mr. Shesh Ghale | (2013–2015 and 2015–2017) | | |
| Mr. Kumar Panta | (2019–2021) | | |
| Dr. Badri K.C. | (2021–2023 and 2023–2025) | Supreme court of Nepal dismisses all the elected Executives from 2021 and ordered to have new election of ICC under the coordination of Shesh Ghale. He was reelected on 20 October 2023 and incubated as president for the ICC (2023–2025). | |
| Mr. Mahesh Kumar Shrestha | (2025–2026) | Elected President of the NRNA ICC during the unity convention held in Kathmandu; later signed a unity agreement with the faction led by Dr. Badri KC to reunify the organisation. | |
| Dr. Hem Raj Sharma | (2026–) | Unanimously elected president. | |

== National Coordination Councils ==
The National Coordination Councils (NCC) serve as the NRNA organization's global network of its chapters, which are currently established in 90 countries around the world. NRNs residing in any country with the exception of SAARC countries can establish a NCC of the NRNA if there are more than 10 individual. Most of the NCCs are independently registered as the national organizations of Nepali Diaspora with the respective Governments in the countries of their residence.

== Membership of the NRNA ==
The NRNA Charter has provision for the following types of membership:

1. General Member: Any Nepali residing in any foreign country for more than 2 years or the people of Nepali origin possessing any other citizenship can be a general member. The foreign country and other citizenship cannot be of the SAARC countries.

2. Registered Member: Any general member registered with a National Coordination Council (NCC) or registered with the International Coordination Council (ICC) is a registered member. In case of a country where there is no NCC, one needs to pay the pre-determined membership fee.

3. Associate Member; Non-Nepali individuals or institutions interested in helping and promoting Nepal can be an associate member.

4. Honorary Member: A person with recognized contributions to the NRN movement can be conferred as the honorary member by the ICC.

== Functions ==
The NRNA carries out various activities to serve the interests of Nepali Diaspora. Some functions it carries out are:

1. Organizes global and regional conferences and interaction programs for its stakeholders.

2. Facilitates strong networking among the NRNs, resident Nepalis and Nepali organizations worldwide.

3. Liaise with the National Coordination Councils, Nepali associations abroad, government and international organizations.

4. Acts as a forum for the promotion and protection of the interests of the NRN community both in Nepal and abroad.

== See also ==
- Nepalese Americans
- Nepalese Canadians
- Nepalese Australians
- Nepalese in the United Kingdom
- Nepalis in Germany
