= Central Development Region, Nepal =

Coordinates: 27°42′N 85°20′E

Central Development Region मध्यमाञ्चल विकास क्षेत्र
- Former Development Region
- Interactive map of Central Development Region
- Country: Nepal
- Headquarters: Hetauda, Makwanpur District, Bagmati Province

Area
  - Total: 27,410 km^{2} (10,580 sq mi)

Population (2011)
  - Total: 9,656,985
  - Density: 352.3/km^{2} (912.5/sq mi)
- Time zone: UTC+5:45 (NPT)
- HDI (2021): 0.557 (medium)

The Central Development Region (Nepali: मध्यमाञ्चल विकास क्षेत्र, Madhyamānchal Bikās Kshetra) was one of Nepal's five development regions. It was located in the east-central part of the country consisting of the capital city Kathmandu, along with its headquarters at Hetauda.

Before the adoption of provinces in 2015, it comprised three zones:

- Bagmati
- Narayani
- Janakpur
