= Western Development Region, Nepal =

Coordinates: 28°15′50″N 83°58′20″E

Western Development Region पश्चिमाञ्चल विकास क्षेत्र
- Former Development Region
- Interactive map of Western Development Region
- Country: Nepal
- Headquarter: Pokhara, Kaski District, Gandaki Zone

Area
  - Total: 29,398 km^{2} (11,351 sq mi)

Population (2011 Census)
  - Total: 4,926,765
  - Density: 167.59/km^{2} (434.1/sq mi)
- Time zone: UTC+5:45 (NPT)
- HDI: ▲0.659 (medium)

The Western Development Region (Nepali: पश्चिमाञ्चल विकास क्षेत्र, Pashchimānchal Bikās Kshetra) was formerly one of Nepal's five development regions. It was located in the west-central part of the country, with its headquarters located in Pokhara. The region was divided into three parts, from south to north in order of increasing altitude: Terai, Hilly and Himalayan. Mustang, Damodar, Peri, Thaple, Ganesh are among the major ranges of the Himalayas.

It comprised three zones:

- Dhawalagiri (or Dhaualagiri)
- Gandaki
- Lumbini
