= List of monuments in Seti Zone =

Seti Zone was one of the fourteen zones of Nepal, comprising five districts, namely, Achham, Bajhang, Bajura, Doti and Kailali. All these districts are now part of the province known as Sudurpashchim Province. Here are district wise lists of Monuments which were in the Seti Zone.

== Seti Zone ==
- List of monuments in Achham District
- List of monuments in Bajhang District
- List of monuments in Bajura District
- List of monuments in Doti District
- List of monuments in Kailali District
