= List of monuments in Mahakali Zone =

Mahakali Zone was one of the fourteen zones of Nepal, comprising four districts, namely, Baitadi, Dadeldhura, Darchula and Kanchanpur. Here is district wise List of Monuments which are in the Mahakali Zone.

== Mahakali Zone ==
- List of monuments in Baitadi District
- List of monuments in Dadeldhura District
- List of monuments in Darchula District
- List of monuments in Kanchanpur District
