= List of forts in Nepal =

This is a list of notable forts in Nepal (Nepali: गढी or किल्ला). Many served as strategic military outposts, royal residences, or administrative centers during various dynasties including the Katyuri, Malla, Sen, and Shah kingdoms.

== Forts ==
Name	Location	Coordinates	Ref(s)
Ajaymerukot	Ajaymeru Rural Municipality, Dadeldhura, Sudurpashchim Province	29.304°N 80.591°E	
Amar Gadhi	Dadeldhura, Sudurpashchim Province	29.299791517847478°N 80.58633114015421°E	
Bairagi Khola Gadhi	Syangja, Gandaki Province	28.046°N 83.944°E	
Balden Gadhi	Rainadevi Chhahara, Lumbini Province	27.875763534914334°N 83.36524008029613°E	
Bara Gadhi	Baragadhi, Province No. 2	26.98410321864227°N 85.12261869772574°E	
Belkot Gadhi	Nuwakot, Bagmati Province	27.834241017337078°N 85.12344945676499°E	
Bhanu Gadhi	Tanahun, Gandaki Province	27.917°N 84.421°E	
Chandrabhoga Gadhi	Saptari, Province No. 2	26.64°N 86.48°E	
Chaudandi Gadhi	Udayapur, Province No. 1	26.811095181529208°N 86.8835807824531°E	
Chisankhu Gadhi	Chisankhugadhi, Province No. 1	27.313146248894345°N 86.61955643221934°E	
Chisapani Gadhi	Makwanpur, Bagmati Province	27.55818839504965°N 85.13775478919716°E	
Dhanpal Gadhi	Belbari, Province No. 1	26.59768777603545°N 87.3951003673009°E	
Duguna Gadhi	Sindhupalchowk, Bagmati Province	27.915989013975622°N 85.91816229979874°E	
Gadhi Mai	Bara, Province No. 2	27.052°N 85.004°E	
Gadhilek Fort	Rolpa, Lumbini Province	–	
Gharpajhong Fort	Gharpajhong, Gandaki Province	28.785008008141187°N 83.730092580849°E	
Gorkha Palace Fort	Gorkha, Gandaki Province	28.004555466744627°N 84.62922580879068°E	
Hariharpur Gadhi	Sindhuli, Bagmati Province	27.316788935400933°N 85.48343376255879°E	
Hatuwa Gadhi	Hatuwagadhi, Province No. 1	27.038345223757965°N 87.1131699567868°E	
Jit Gadhi	Butwal, Lumbini Province	27.703138791326353°N 83.4595701625654°E	
Kagbeni Fort	Mustang, Gandaki Province	28.843517958225583°N 83.74382324637227°E	
Kandrang Gadhi	Dhading, Bagmati Province	–	
Kankre Bihar Fort	Surkhet, Karnali Province	28.599°N 81.646°E	
Karma Gadhi	Lumbini, Lumbini Province	27.506457433634388°N 83.43786827241263°E	
Kaski Fort	Kaski, Gandaki Province	28.271992885388727°N 83.90446989842297°E	
Kot Gadhi	Dailekh, Karnali Province	28.652889538956842°N 81.55387169148402°E	
Liglig Kot	Palungtar, Gandaki Province	28.062244592715988°N 84.52699044991128°E	
Lo Manthang Fort	Mustang, Gandaki Province	29.18319567268602°N 83.9576207405819°E	
Majhuwa Gadhi	Rupakot Majhuwagadhi, Province No. 1	27.199921482097597°N 86.79546376957043°E	
Makwanpur Gadhi	Makwanpur, Bagmati Province	27.411003535091428°N 85.1474539586797°E	
Nuwakot Gadhi	Nuwakot, Bagmati Province	27.913746601425814°N 85.16464792210367°E	
Padudanda Fort	Dhading, Bagmati Province	28.000205735881075°N 84.9184567121493°E	
Palpa Gadhi	Palpa, Lumbini Province	27.869°N 83.539°E	
Parsa Gadhi	Parsagadhi, Province No. 2	27.188800582476667°N 84.87858892908488°E	
Rani Mahal Fort	Palpa, Lumbini Province	27.939°N 83.423°E	
Rasuwa Fort	Rasuwa, Bagmati Province	28.27771573631759°N 85.37786187669766°E	
Sanguri Gadhi (Dhankuta)	Dhankuta, Province No. 1	26.86009940211047°N 87.32110698589761°E	
Sangurigadhi (Sangurigadhi)	Sangurigadhi, Province No. 1	26.89322680211097°N 87.20734325615014°E	
Satahun Gadhi	Saptari, Province No. 2	26.600°N 86.733°E	
Sharmali Gadhi	Baitadi, Sudurpashchim Province	29.397945209532875°N 80.35113390980435°E	
Shiva Gadhi	Shivagadhi, Lumbini Province	27.755074058192022°N 82.80300893749279°E	
Simraungadh Fort	Bara, Province No. 2	26.889346948643524°N 85.11635739785926°E	
Sindhuli Gadhi	Sindhuli, Bagmati Province	27.28075089842321°N 85.95523216594425°E	
Surya Gadhi	Suryagadhi, Bagmati Province	27.947980979713662°N 85.2309285154187°E	
Tansen Fort	Tansen, Lumbini Province	27.867°N 83.546°E	
Udayapur Gadhi	Ichchhakamana, Province No. 1	26.94832944379797°N 86.53037276292834°E	
Upardang Gadhi	Chitwan, Bagmati Province	27.767100275620876°N 84.5664499595685°E	

== See also ==
- List of World Heritage Sites in Nepal
- Military history of Nepal
