= 1981 Nepal census =

8th national census of Nepal

1981 Nepal Census
- 1981

General information
- Country: Nepal
- Authority: Central Bureau of Statistics
- Website: www.cbs.gov.np

Results
- Total population: 15,022,839 (▲30.00%)
- Most populous Development Region: Central (4,909,357)
- Least populous Development Region: Far-Western (1,320,089)

The 1981 Nepal census was the 8th national census of Nepal. The census was conducted by Central Bureau of Statistics. According to the census the total population of Nepal was 15,022,839.

This census was followed by the 1991 Nepal census.

== Key findings ==
The key findings of 1981 census are as follows:

Total population	15,022,839
Intercensal change	3,466,856
Intercensal change percentage	30.00%
Annual growth rate	2.62%
Population density (per km^{2})	102.1
Male population	7,695,336
Female population	7,327,503
Gender ratio	105.0
Literacy rate	23.3%

== Population distribution ==
Population by ecological region (1981)
Ecological region	Population	Percentage (%)	Sex ratio	Annual growth rate (%)	Population density (per km^{2})
Mountain	1,302,896	8.7	104.71	1.35	25.14
Hill	7,163,115	47.7	102.14	1.65	116.76
Terai	6,556,828	43.6	108.33	4.11	192.71
Nepal	15,022,839	100	105.02	2.62	102.07

Population by development region (1981)
Development region	Population	Percentage (%)	Sex ratio	Population density (per km^{2})
Eastern	3,708,923	24.69	105	130.32
Central	4,909,357	32.68	107	179.10
Western	3,128,859	20.83	103	106.43
Mid-Western	1,955,611	13.02	103	46.14
Far-Western	1,320,089	8.78	105	67.56
Nepal	15,022,839	100	105	102.07

Population by zone (1981)
S.N	Development region	Zone	Population	Sex ratio	Density (per km^{2})
1	Eastern	Mechi	932,625	107	113.79
2	Eastern	Koshi	1,423,624	106	147.24
3	Eastern	Sagarmatha	1,352,674	104	127.72
4	Central	Janakpur	1,688,115	105	174.59
5	Central	Bagmati	1,782,439	109	189.06
6	Central	Narayani	1,438,803	107	173.08
7	Western	Gandaki	1,107,569	97	90.23
8	Western	Dhaulagiri	453,462	102	55.65
9	Western	Lumbini	1,567,828	107	174.69
10	Mid-Western	Rapti	876,723	100	83.64
11	Mid-Western	Bheri	836,402	106	79.32
12	Mid-Western	Karnali	242,486	108	11.36
13	Far-Western	Seti	794,911	102	63.34
14	Far-Western	Mahakali	525,178	110	75.14
Nepal			15,022,839	105	102.07

== Population by district ==
Population by district (1981)
S.N	Zone	District	Population	Sex ratio	Density (per km^{2})
1	Mechi	Taplejung	120,780	101	33.10
2	Mechi	Panchthar	153,746	99	123.67
3	Mechi	Ilam	178,356	107	104.73
4	Mechi	Jhapa	479,743	111	298.72
5	Koshi	Sankhuwasabha	129,414	102	37.18
6	Koshi	Tehrathum	92,454	98	136.16
7	Koshi	Dhankuta	129,781	104	145.65
8	Koshi	Bhojpur	192,689	102	127.86
9	Koshi	Morang	534,692	108	288.24
10	Koshi	Sunsari	344,594	107	274.14
11	Sagarmatha	Solukhumbu	88,245	102	26.64
12	Sagarmatha	Khotang	212,571	101	133.61
13	Sagarmatha	Okhaldhunga	137,640	96	128.15
14	Sagarmatha	Udayapur	159,805	105	77.46
15	Sagarmatha	Saptari	379,055	105	278.10
16	Sagarmatha	Siraha	375,358	108	315.95
17	Janakpur	Dolakha	150,576	99	68.72
18	Janakpur	Ramechhap	161,445	93	104.43
19	Janakpur	Sindhuli	183,705	103	73.74
20	Janakpur	Dhanusha	432,569	108	366.58
21	Janakpur	Mahottari	361,054	107	360.33
22	Janakpur	Sarlahi	398,766	107	316.73
23	Bagmati	Sindhupalchok	232,326	112	91.39
24	Bagmati	Kavrepalanchok	307,150	103	220.02
25	Bagmati	Rasuwa	30,241	108	19.58
26	Bagmati	Nuwakot	202,976	106	181.06
27	Bagmati	Dhading	243,401	105	126.37
28	Bagmati	Kathmandu	422,237	117	1068.95
29	Bagmati	Lalitpur	184,341	113	478.80
30	Bagmati	Bhaktapur	159,767	105	1342.58
31	Narayani	Makwanpur	243,411	106	100.33
32	Narayani	Chitwan	259,571	106	117.03
33	Narayani	Rautahat	332,526	108	295.32
34	Narayani	Bara	318,957	107	268.03
35	Narayani	Parsa	284,338	106	210.15
36	Gandaki	Manang	7,021	102	3.13
37	Gandaki	Gorkha	231,294	98	64.07
38	Gandaki	Lamjung	152,720	90	90.26
39	Gandaki	Kaski	221,272	102	109.70
40	Gandaki	Tanahun	223,438	103	144.52
41	Gandaki	Syangja	271,824	91	233.52
42	Dhaulagiri	Mustang	12,930	112	3.62
43	Dhaulagiri	Myagdi	96,904	115	42.19
44	Dhaulagiri	Parbat	128,400	94	259.91
45	Dhaulagiri	Baglung	215,228	99	120.64
46	Lumbini	Palpa	214,442	103	156.18
47	Lumbini	Gulmi	238,113	94	207.23
48	Lumbini	Arghakhanchi	157,304	122	131.85
49	Lumbini	Nawalparasi	308,828	106	142.84
50	Lumbini	Rupandehi	379,096	108	278.74
51	Lumbini	Kapilvastu	270,045	113	155.37
52	Rapti	Rukum	132,432	103	46.03
53	Rapti	Rolpa	168,166	96	89.49
54	Rapti	Salyan	152,063	100	104.01
55	Rapti	Pyuthan	157,669	96	120.45
56	Rapti	Dang	266,393	104	90.15
57	Bheri	Jajarkot	99,312	109	44.53
58	Bheri	Dailekh	166,527	100	110.87
59	Bheri	Surkhet	166,196	101	67.81
60	Bheri	Banke	205,323	109	87.86
61	Bheri	Bardiya	199,044	109	98.29
62	Karnali	Humla	20,303	109	3.59
63	Karnali	Dolpa	22,043	108	2.79
64	Karnali	Mugu	43,705	108	12.36
65	Karnali	Kalikot	87,638	106	50.34
66	Karnali	Jumla	68,797	109	27.18
67	Seti	Bajura	74,649	102	34.11
68	Seti	Bajhang	124,010	101	36.24
69	Seti	Achham	185,212	94	110.24
70	Seti	Doti	153,135	96	75.62
71	Seti	Kailali	257,905	112	79.72
72	Mahakali	Darchula	90,218	105	38.85
73	Mahakali	Baitadi	179,136	103	117.93
74	Mahakali	Dadeldhura	86,853	106	56.47
75	Mahakali	Kanchanpur	168,971	123	104.95
Nepal			15,022,839	105	102.07

== Population by language ==
Languages by number of native speakers (1981)
S.N.	Language	Number of speakers	Percentage (%)
1	Nepali	8,767,361	58.36
2	Maithili	1,668,309	11.11
3	Bhojpuri	1,142,805	7.61
4	Tharu	545,685	3.63
5	Tamang	522,416	3.48
6	Newar	448,746	2.99
7	Awadhi	234,343	1.56
8	Rai, Kirat	221,353	1.47
9	Magar	212,681	1.42
10	Gurung	174,464	1.16
11	Limbu	129,234	0.86
12	Bhote, Sherpa	73,589	0.49
13	Rajbansi	59,383	0.40
14	Satar	22,403	0.15
15	Danuwar	13,522	0.09
16	Sunuwar	10,650	0.07
17	Santhali	5,804	0.04
18	Thakali	5,289	0.04
Other		7,64,802	5.09
Total		15,022,839	100

== See also ==
- Census in Nepal
- 1971 Nepal census
- 1991 Nepal census
