= 2021 Nepal census =

12th national census of Nepal

2021 Nepal Census
- 11 – 25 November 2021

General information
- Country: Nepal
- Authority: Central Bureau of Statistics
- Website: censusresults.nsonepal.gov.np

Results
- Total population: 29,164,578 (▲10.08%)
- Most populous Province: Bagmati (6,116,866)
- Least populous Province: Karnali (1,688,412)

The 2021 Nepal Census is the twelfth nationwide census of Nepal conducted by the Central Bureau of Statistics. It is the first census conducted after the adoption of new federal structure of 7 provinces, 77 districts and 753 local bodies. The census was originally scheduled from 8 to 22 June 2021, but was postponed to November 2021 due to a surge in COVID-19 cases in the country.

== Background ==
In Nepal, the work of conducting a census started in 1911 A.D. (1968 B.S.) and a census has been carried out approximately every 10 years since then. The main objective of the first and second census was to prepare a list of property owners, tenants, and buildings. Until the census conducted in 1998 B.S (1941/42 A.D), the enumeration exercise was limited to a short census questionnaire. However, the censuses conducted since 2009/11 B.S. (1952/54 A.D.) have been recognized as modern (scientific) censuses, including the collection of demographic characteristics. After the establishment of the Central Bureau of Statistics in 2015 B.S (1959 A.D), all censuses since then have been conducted by this bureau. In this sequence, the national census of 2078 B.S (2021 A.D) is the first census conducted under Nepal's federal system according to the provisions of the Constitution of Nepal issued in 2072 B.S (2015 A.D).

== Planning ==
The National Census of 2078 was conducted in two phases, with the first phase being carried out by supervisors who went to every home and family and prepared a household registration form, detailing information about the house and household, the number of members in the family, the family's agriculture-related details, whether the family had received government funding for building a residential house, the number of individuals who had bank or financial institution accounts, and details about technical and vocational education or training received by members of the family, as well as information about credit facilities obtained from cooperative or financial institutions.

In the second phase, enumerators went to every family and collected information about demographic, educational, residential, economic, disability, reproductive health, and other details using a main questionnaire. During the second phase, detailed monitoring of the collection of site-specific data was carried out by the supervisor, and each ward office collected ward-level community questionnaire-based information on the basis of sources, resources, capacity, precedent, and disaster risk.

== Questionnaire ==
https://commons.wikimedia.org/wiki/File:Census_2021_Questionnaire_Community.pdf

https://commons.wikimedia.org/wiki/File:Census_2021_Questionnaire_Main.pdf

== Key findings ==
The key findings of the 2021 census are as follows:

Population	Total	29,164,578
Population	Male	14,253,551
Population	Female	14,911,027
Intercensal change		2,670,074 (▲10.08%)
Population density (per km^{2})		198
Annual growth rate (%)		0.92%
Sex ratio (males per 100 females)		95.59
Number of households		6,666,937
Literacy rate	Total	76.2%
Literacy rate	Male	83.6%
Literacy rate	Female	69.4%

== Population distribution ==
Urban/rural population (2021)
Urban/rural	Population	Percentage (%)	Sex ratio	Density (per km^{2})	Annual growth rate (%)
Urban municipalities	19,296,788	66.17	96.06	373	1.36
Rural municipalities	9,867,790	33.83	94.68	105	0.11
Nepal	29,164,578	100	95.59	198	0.92

Population by ecological belt (2021)
Ecological belt	Population	Percentage (%)	Sex ratio	Density (per km^{2})	Annual growth rate (%)
Mountain	1,772,948	6.08	97.28	34	-0.05
Hill	11,757,624	40.31	94.65	192	0.30
Terai	15,634,006	53.61	96.11	460	1.54
Nepal	29,164,578	100	95.59	198	0.92

Population by province (2021)
S.N	Province	Population	Percentage (%)	Sex ratio	Density (per km^{2})	Annual growth rate (%)
1	Koshi	4,961,412	17.01	95.02	192	0.86
2	Madhesh	6,114,600	20.97	100.55	633	1.19
3	Bagmati	6,116,866	20.97	99.36	301	0.97
4	Gandaki	2,466,427	8.46	90.37	115	0.25
5	Lumbini	5,122,078	17.56	92.01	230	1.24
6	Karnali	1,688,412	5.79	95.27	60	0.70
7	Sudurpashchim	2,694,783	9.24	89.51	138	0.52
Nepal		29,164,578	100	95.59	198	0.92

== Population by district ==
Population by district (2021)
S.N	Province	District	Population	Sex ratio	Density (per km^{2})	Annual growth rate (%)
1	Koshi	Taplejung	120,590	101.60	33	-0.53
2	Koshi	Sankhuwasabha	158,041	101.42	45	-0.04
3	Koshi	Solukhumbu	104,851	101.23	32	-0.09
4	Koshi	Okhaldhunga	139,552	95.25	130	-0.56
5	Koshi	Khotang	175,298	97.72	110	-1.56
6	Koshi	Bhojpur	157,923	98.12	105	-1.39
7	Koshi	Dhankuta	150,599	96.16	169	-0.78
8	Koshi	Tehrathum	88,731	96.52	131	-1.30
9	Koshi	Panchthar	172,400	98.81	139	-1.02
10	Koshi	Ilam	279,534	99.52	164	-0.36
11	Koshi	Jhapa	998,054	92.10	621	1.97
12	Koshi	Morang	1,148,156	94.39	619	1.66
13	Koshi	Sunsari	926,962	93.95	737	1.86
14	Koshi	Udayapur	340,721	92.52	165	0.68
15	Madhesh	Saptari	706,255	99.01	518	0.96
16	Madhesh	Siraha	739,953	96.68	623	1.43
17	Madhesh	Dhanusha	867,747	98.18	735	1.34
18	Madhesh	Mahottari	706,994	97.58	706	1.14
19	Madhesh	Sarlahi	862,470	101.82	685	1.09
20	Madhesh	Rautahat	813,573	100.80	723	1.63
21	Madhesh	Bara	763,137	104.40	641	1.00
22	Madhesh	Parsa	654,471	106.99	484	0.82
23	Bagmati	Dolakha	172,767	94.02	79	-0.74
24	Bagmati	Sindhupalchok	262,624	96.84	103	-0.88
25	Bagmati	Rasuwa	46,689	106.10	30	0.72
26	Bagmati	Dhading	325,710	95.43	169	-0.30
27	Bagmati	Nuwakot	263,391	95.99	235	-0.50
28	Bagmati	Kathmandu	2,041,587	102.97	5169	1.51
29	Bagmati	Bhaktapur	432,132	102.20	3631	3.35
30	Bagmati	Lalitpur	551,667	100.95	1433	1.58
31	Bagmati	Kavrepalanchok	364,039	96.64	261	-0.46
32	Bagmati	Ramechhap	170,302	90.33	110	-1.67
33	Bagmati	Sindhuli	300,026	96.15	120	0.12
34	Bagmati	Makwanpur	466,073	100.67	192	0.99
35	Bagmati	Chitwan	719,859	95.58	325	2.07
36	Gandaki	Gorkha	251,027	88.92	70	-0.74
37	Gandaki	Manang	5,658	129.44	3	-1.39
38	Gandaki	Mustang	14,452	121.72	4	0.69
39	Gandaki	Myagdi	107,033	95.03	47	-0.57
40	Gandaki	Kaski	600,051	95.29	297	1.90
41	Gandaki	Lamjung	155,852	90.59	92	-0.70
42	Gandaki	Tanahu	321,153	87.74	208	-0.06
43	Gandaki	Nawalparasi (East)	378,079	88.86	265	1.86
44	Gandaki	Syangja	253,024	85.57	217	-1.28
45	Gandaki	Parbat	130,887	89.12	265	-1.09
46	Gandaki	Baglung	249,211	87.35	140	-0.72
47	Lumbini	Rukum (East)	56,786	94.01	34	0.63
48	Lumbini	Rolpa	234,793	87.95	125	0.43
49	Lumbini	Pyuthan	232,019	81.43	177	0.16
50	Lumbini	Gulmi	246,494	83.31	215	-1.23
51	Lumbini	Arghakhanchi	177,086	83.67	148	-1.05
52	Lumbini	Palpa	245,027	85.25	178	-0.61
53	Lumbini	Nawalparasi (West)	386,868	94.71	527	1.47
54	Lumbini	Rupandehi	1,121,957	96.33	825	2.33
55	Lumbini	Kapilbastu	682,961	96.10	393	1.70
56	Lumbini	Dang	674,993	90.45	228	1.92
57	Lumbini	Banke	603,194	96.83	258	1.97
58	Lumbini	Bardiya	459,900	89.15	227	0.72
59	Karnali	Dolpa	42,774	99.85	5	1.47
60	Karnali	Mugu	64,549	100.66	18	1.49
61	Karnali	Humla	55,394	101.37	10	0.82
62	Karnali	Jumla	118,349	100.18	47	0.80
63	Karnali	Kalikot	145,292	98.90	83	0.57
64	Karnali	Dailekh	252,313	91.82	168	-0.35
65	Karnali	Jajarkot	189,360	98.71	85	0.96
66	Karnali	Rukum (West)	166,740	94.68	137	0.68
67	Karnali	Salyan	238,515	93.08	163	-0.16
68	Karnali	Surkhet	415,126	92.74	169	1.62
69	Sudurpashchim	Bajura	138,523	93.87	63	0.25
70	Sudurpashchim	Bajhang	189,085	87.93	55	-0.30
71	Sudurpashchim	Darchula	133,310	93.52	57	0.00
72	Sudurpashchim	Baitadi	242,157	88.75	159	-0.34
73	Sudurpashchim	Dadeldhura	139,602	89.40	91	-0.17
74	Sudurpashchim	Doti	204,831	84.16	101	-0.32
75	Sudurpashchim	Achham	228,852	85.26	136	-1.13
76	Sudurpashchim	Kailali	904,666	91.99	280	1.48
77	Sudurpashchim	Kanchanpur	513,757	88.14	319	1.25
Nepal			29,164,578	95.59	198	0.92

== Population by caste/ethnicity ==
However, there were 146 castes/ethnicities in Nepal according to the 2021 census, out of which 125 were previously reported in the earlier 2011 census and 17 were newly found in the 2021 census.

The newly added castes/ethnicities were Ranatharu, Bhumihar, Bankariya, Surel, Chumba/Nubri, Phree, Mugal/Mugum, Pun, Rauniyar, Baniyan, Gondh/Gond, Karmarong, Khatik, Beldar, Chai/Khulaut, Done and Kewarat.

Population by caste/ethnicity (2021)
S.N	Caste/ethnicity	Population	Percentage (%)
1	Chhetri	4,796,995	16.45
2	Brahmin - Hill	3,292,373	11.29
3	Magar	2,013,498	6.9
4	Tharu	1,807,124	6.2
5	Tamang	1,639,866	5.62
6	Bishwakarma	1,470,010	5.04
7	Musalman	1,418,677	4.86
8	Newa: (Newar)	1,341,363	4.6
9	Yadav	1,228,581	4.21
10	Rai	640,674	2.2
11	Pariyar	565,932	1.94
12	Gurung	543,790	1.86
13	Thakuri	494,470	1.7
14	Mijar	452,229	1.55
15	Teli	431,347	1.48
16	Yakthung/Limbu	414,704	1.42
17	Chamar/Harijan/Ram	393,255	1.35
18	Kushwaha(koiri)	355,707	1.22
19	Kurmi	277,786	0.95
20	Musahar	264,974	0.91
21	Dhanuk	252,105	0.86
22	Dusadh/Pasawan/Pasi	250,977	0.86
23	Brahman - Terai	217,774	0.75
24	Mallaha	207,006	0.71
25	Sanyasi/Dasnami	198,849	0.68
26	Kewat	184,298	0.63
27	Kanu	152,868	0.52
28	Hajam	136,487	0.47
29	Kalwar	134,914	0.46
30	Rajbansi	132,564	0.45
31	Sherpa	130,637	0.45
32	Kumal	129,702	0.44
33	Tatma/Tatwa	126,018	0.43
34	Khatwe	124,062	0.43
35	Gharti/Bhujel	120,245	0.41
36	Majhi	111,352	0.38
37	Nuniya	108,723	0.37
38	Sundi	107,380	0.37
39	Dhobi	101,089	0.35
40	Lohar	100,680	0.35
41	Bin	96,974	0.33
42	Kumhar	95,724	0.33
43	Sonar	93,380	0.32
44	Chepang/Praja	84,364	0.29
45	Ranatharu	83,308	0.29
46	Danuwar	82,784	0.28
47	Sunuwar	78,910	0.27
48	Haluwai	71,796	0.25
49	Baraee	68,011	0.23
50	Bantar/Sardar	61,687	0.21
51	Kahar	59,882	0.21
52	Santhal	57,310	0.2
53	Baniyan	53,655	0.18
54	Kathabaniyan	52,466	0.18
55	Badhaee/Badhee	52,437	0.18
56	Oraon/Kudukh	46,840	0.16
57	Rajput/Thakur	46,577	0.16
58	Amat	46,471	0.16
59	Gangai	41,446	0.14
60	Lodh	39,872	0.14
61	Gaderi/Bhediyar	35,497	0.12
62	Ghale	35,434	0.12
63	Marwadi	33,803	0.12
64	Kayastha	33,502	0.11
65	Kulung	33,388	0.11
66	Thami	32,743	0.11
67	Bhumihar	32,199	0.11
68	Rajbhar	29,240	0.1
69	Rauniyar	27,258	0.09
70	Dhimal	25,643	0.09
71	Khawas	22,551	0.08
72	Tajpuriya	20,989	0.07
73	Kori	20,670	0.07
74	Dom	19,901	0.07
75	Mali	19,605	0.07
76	Darai	18,695	0.06
77	Yakkha	17,460	0.06
78	Bhote	15,818	0.05
79	Bantawa	15,719	0.05
80	Rajdhob	15,391	0.05
81	Dhunia	15,033	0.05
82	Pahari	15,015	0.05
83	Bangali	13,800	0.05
84	Gondh/Gond	12,267	0.04
85	Chamling	12,178	0.04
86	Chhantyal/Chhantel	11,963	0.04
87	Thakali	11,741	0.04
88	Badi	11,470	0.04
89	Bote	11,258	0.04
90	Hyolmo/Yholmopa	9,819	0.03
91	Khatik	9,152	0.03
92	Yamphu	9,111	0.03
93	Kewarat	8,809	0.03
94	Baram / Baramu	7,859	0.03
95	Dev	7,418	0.03
96	Nachhiring	7,300	0.03
97	Gaine	6,971	0.02
98	Bahing	6,547	0.02
99	Thulung	6,239	0.02
100	Jirel	6,031	0.02
101	Khaling	5,889	0.02
102	Aathpahariya	5,878	0.02
103	Dolpo	5,818	0.02
104	Sarbaria	5,793	0.02
105	Mewahang	5,727	0.02
106	Byasi/Sauka	5,718	0.02
107	Dura	5,581	0.02
108	Meche	5,193	0.02
109	Raji	5,125	0.02
110	Sampang	4,841	0.02
111	Chai/Khulaut	4,805	0.02
112	Chumba/Nubri	4,414	0.02
114	Dhankar/ Dharikar	4,090	0.01
114	Munda	3,589	0.01
115	Lepcha	3,578	0.01
116	Patharkatt / Kushwadiya	3,343	0.01
117	Hayu	3,069	0.01
118	Beldar	3,037	0.01
119	Halkhor	2,929	0.01
120	Natuwa	2,896	0.01
121	Loharung	2,598	0.01
122	Kamar	2,532	0.01
123	Dhandi	2,339	0.01
124	Done	2,125	0.01
125	Mugal/Mugum	2,124	0.01
126	Punjabi/Sikh	1,846	0.01
127	Karmarong	1,663	0.01
128	Chidimar	1,615	0.01
129	Kisan	1,479	0.01
130	Lhopa	1,390	0
131	Kalar	931	0
132	Phree	921	0
133	Koche	847	0
134	Topkegola	642	0
135	Raute	566	0
136	Walung	481	0
137	Lhomi	355	0
138	Surel	318	0
139	Kusunda	253	0
140	Bankariya	180	0
141	Nurang	36	0
Others		5,888	0.02
Foreigner		137,407	0.47
Not stated		4,436	0.02
Total		29,164,578	100

== Population by language ==
=== Mother tongues ===
There were 124 mother tongues reported in the 2021 census. 111 languages were previously reported in the earlier 2011 census and 13 were newly found in the 2021 census. Some of the foreign languages reported in 2011 census have been included in "Other Language" category due very few number of speakers.

The newly added mother tongues were Bhote, Lowa, Chum/Nubri, Baragunwa, Nar-Phu, Ranatharu, Karmarong, Mugali, Tichhurong Poike, Sadri, Done, Munda/Mudiyari and Kewarat.

Languages by number of native speakers (2021)
S.N	Language	Number of speakers	Percentage (%)
1	Nepali	13,084,457	44.86
2	Maithili	3,222,389	11.05
3	Bhojpuri	1,820,795	6.24
4	Tharu	1,714,091	5.88
5	Tamang	1,423,075	4.88
6	Bajjika	1,133,764	3.89
7	Avadhi	864,276	2.96
8	Nepal Bhasha (Newar)	863,380	2.96
9	Magar Dhut	810,315	2.78
10	Doteli	494,864	1.7
11	Urdu	413,785	1.42
12	Yakthung/Limbu	350,436	1.2
13	Gurung	328,074	1.12
14	Magahi	230,117	0.79
15	Baitadeli	152,666	0.52
16	Rai	144,512	0.5
17	Achhami	141,444	0.48
18	Bantawa	138,003	0.47
19	Rajbanshi	130,163	0.45
20	Sherpa	117,896	0.4
21	Khash	117,511	0.4
22	Bajhangi	99,631	0.34
23	Hindi	98,399	0.34
24	Magar Kham	91,753	0.31
25	Chamling	89,037	0.31
26	Ranatharu	77,766	0.27
27	Chepang	58,392	0.2
28	Bajureli	56,486	0.19
29	Santali	53,677	0.18
30	Danuwar	49,992	0.17
31	Darchuleli	45,649	0.16
32	Uranw/Urau	38,873	0.13
33	Kulung	37,912	0.13
34	Angika	35,952	0.12
35	Majhi	32,917	0.11
36	Sunuwar	32,708	0.11
37	Thami	26,805	0.09
38	Ganagai	26,281	0.09
39	Thulung	24,405	0.08
40	Bangla	23,774	0.08
41	Ghale	23,049	0.08
42	Sampang	21,597	0.07
43	Marwadi	21,333	0.07
44	Dadeldhuri	21,300	0.07
45	Dhimal	20,583	0.07
46	Tajpuriya	20,349	0.07
47	Kumal	18,435	0.06
48	Khaling	16,514	0.06
49	Musalman	16,252	0.06
50	Wambule	15,285	0.05
51	Bahing/Bayung	14,449	0.05
52	Yakkha	14,241	0.05
53	Sanskrit	13,906	0.05
54	Bhujel	13,086	0.04
55	Bhote	12,895	0.04
56	Darai	12,156	0.04
57	Yamphu/Yamphe	10,744	0.04
58	Nachhiring	9,906	0.03
59	Hyolmo/Yholmo	9,658	0.03
60	Dumi	8,638	0.03
61	Jumli	8,338	0.03
62	Bote	7,687	0.03
63	Mewahang	7,428	0.03
64	Puma	6,763	0.02
65	Pahari	5,946	0.02
66	Athpahariya	5,580	0.02
67	Dungmali	5,403	0.02
68	Jirel	5,167	0.02
69	Tibetan	5,053	0.02
70	Dailekhi	4,989	0.02
71	Chum/Nubri	4,284	0.01
72	Chhantyal	4,282	0.01
73	Raji	4,247	0.01
74	Thakali	4,220	0.01
75	Meche	4,203	0.01
76	Koyee	4,152	0.01
77	Lohorung	3,884	0.01
78	Kewarat	3,469	0.01
79	Dolpali	3,244	0.01
80	Done	3,100	0.01
81	Mugali	2,834	0.01
82	Jero/Jerung	2,817	0.01
83	Karmarong	2,619	0.01
84	Chhintang	2,564	0.01
85	Lhopa	2,348	0.01
86	Lapcha	2,240	0.01
87	Munda/Mudiyari	2,107	0.01
88	Manange	2,022	0.01
89	Chhiling	2,011	0.01
90	Dura	1,991	0.01
91	Tilung	1,969	0.01
92	Sign Language	1,784	0.01
93	Byansi	1,706	0.01
94	Balkura/Baram	1,539	0.01
95	Baragunwa	1,536	0.01
96	Sadri	1,347	0
97	English	1,323	0
98	Magar Kaike	1,225	0
99	Sonaha	1,182	0
100	Hayu/Vayu	1,133	0
101	Kisan	1,004	0
102	Punjabi	871	0
103	Dhuleli	786	0
104	Khamchi(Raute)	741	0
105	Lungkhim	702	0
106	Lowa	624	0
107	Kagate	611	0
108	Waling/Walung	545	0
109	Nar-Phu	428	0
110	Lhomi	413	0
111	Tichhurong Poike	410	0
112	Kurmali	397	0
113	Koche	332	0
114	Sindhi	291	0
115	Phangduwali	247	0
116	Belhare	177	0
117	Surel	174	0
118	Malpande	161	0
119	Khariya	132	0
120	Sadhani	122	0
121	Hariyanwi	114	0
122	Sam	106	0
123	Bankariya	86	0
124	Kusunda	23	0
Others		4,201	0.01
Not stated		346	0
Total		29,164,578	100

=== Second Language ===
There were 25 languages that were being used as second language by more than 10 thousand population on each in the 2021 census in Nepal, whereas there were only 18 such languages reported as second language in the earlier 2011 census.

Languages by number of second-language speakers (2021)
S.N	Language	Number of speakers	Percentage (%)
1	No Second Language	14,023,086	48.08
2	Nepali	13,482,904	46.23
3	Maithili	267,621	0.92
4	Hindi	223,106	0.76
5	Bhojpuri	138,572	0.48
6	English	102,561	0.35
7	Tharu	89,606	0.31
8	Bajjika	86,062	0.3
9	Avadhi	75,651	0.26
10	Urdu	72,128	0.25
11	Tamang	71,569	0.25
12	Magar Dhut	54,143	0.19
13	Bhote	45,292	0.16
14	Bantawa	43,536	0.15
15	Nepal Bhasa (Newar)	32,604	0.11
16	Chamling	29,253	0.1
17	Magahi	29,191	0.1
18	Gurung	23,698	0.08
19	Yakthung/Limbu	19,705	0.07
20	Thulung	17,187	0.06
21	Magar Kham	16,814	0.06
22	Bahing/Bayung	15,104	0.05
23	Rai	14,398	0.05
24	Doteli	14,344	0.05
25	Sampang	14,261	0.05
26	Khaling	10,370	0.04
27	Baitadeli	9,521	0.03
28	Sherpa	9,435	0.03
29	Sanskrit	6,615	0.02
30	Achhami	6,522	0.02
31	Angika	6,127	0.02
32	Musalman	6,084	0.02
33	Kulung	6,039	0.02
34	Dumi	5,870	0.02
35	Dadeldhuri	5,535	0.02
36	Bangla	5,447	0.02
37	Wambule	5,227	0.02
38	Darchuleli	4,272	0.01
39	Puma	4,271	0.01
40	Rajbanshi	4,103	0.01
41	Bote	3,891	0.01
42	Mewahang	3,669	0.01
43	Marwadi	3,449	0.01
44	Nachhiring	3,176	0.01
45	Tibetan	3,134	0.01
46	Bajhangi	2,641	0.01
47	Khash	2,607	0.01
48	Chhintang	2,135	0.01
49	Tilung	1,762	0.01
50	Sunuwar	1,597	0.01
51	Belhare	1,491	0.01
52	Punjabi	1,274	0
53	Dungmali	1,271	0
54	Jero/Jerung	1,245	0
55	Jumli	1,125	0
56	Bajureli	1,076	0
57	Dhimal	999	0
58	Majhi	971	0
59	Ghale	963	0
60	Koyee	928	0
61	Ranatharu	871	0
62	Thami	859	0
63	Danuwar	845	0
64	Chepang	833	0
65	Sign Language	828	0
66	Bhujel	740	0
67	Thakali	733	0
68	Yakkha	704	0
69	Santali	703	0
70	Chhiling	685	0
71	Ganagai	644	0
72	Lohorung	622	0
73	Kumal	615	0
74	Kagate	615	0
75	Darai	591	0
76	Khamchi(Raute)	526	0
77	Magar Kaike	515	0
78	Hyolmo/Yholmo	508	0
79	Yamphu/Yamphe	494	0
80	Dailekhi	434	0
81	Chhantyal	394	0
82	Hayu/Vayu	349	0
83	Koche	335	0
84	Jirel	332	0
85	Athpahariya	320	0
86	Balkura/Baram	307	0
87	Waling/Walung	304	0
88	Manange	304	0
89	Dura	278	0
90	Uranw/Urau	245	0
91	Lapcha	242	0
92	Sindhi	217	0
93	Tajpuriya	209	0
94	Dhuleli	187	0
95	Pahari	142	0
96	Lhopa	129	0
97	Dolpali	127	0
98	Sadhani	125	0
99	Sadri	106	0
100	Baragunwa	89	0
101	Phangduwali	85	0
102	Hariyanwi	84	0
103	Sam	79	0
104	Malpande	78	0
105	Raji	76	0
106	Meche	75	0
107	Tichhurong Poike	72	0
108	Surel	64	0
109	Kurmali	60	0
110	Bankariya	42	0
111	Kewarat	38	0
112	Sonaha	35	0
113	Karmarong	34	0
114	Kisan	33	0
115	Byansi	32	0
116	Kusunda	32	0
117	Lungkhim	28	0
118	Mugali	23	0
Others		159	0
Not stated		8,105	0.03
Total		29,164,578	100

== Population by religion ==
Population by religion (2021)
S.N	Religion	Population	Percentage (%)
1	Hinduism	23,677,744	81.19
2	Buddhism	2,393,549	8.21
3	Islam	1,483,066	5.09
4	Kirat	924,204	3.17
5	Christianity	512,313	1.76
6	Prakriti (Nature Worship/Animism)	102,048	0.35
7	Bon	67,223	0.23
8	Jain	2,398	0.01
9	Sikh	1,496	0.01
10	Bahai Faith	537	0.00
Total		29,164,578	100

== Controversies ==
The enumerators of the census have been alleged to use pencil while filling out the forms, instead of ink pen.

The Kayat community of Baglung declared boycotting from the census. The Nepal Federation of Indigenous Nationalities issued a statement alleging the census enumerators not asking the questions on language and religion. The federation has alleged enumerators of filling the form without asking these questions. The enumerators have also been alleged for noting second language as "Nepali", without asking the person. An enumerator was captured by the locals in Lamjung alleging that they noted their religion as Hindu, despite informing them that they are Buddhists.

The Wambule community expressed its concern over census enumeration form having their language mentioned as "Yambule". Rai organizations also drew attention of the authorities citing that there is a Rai ethnicity, but no Rai language and that Rai people speak 26 languages which census enumeration form has incorrectly listed.

People of Nisikhola Rural Municipality demanded to re-take the census after enumerators noted information in their notebooks instead of the official enumeration form. The deputy house speaker of Bagmati Province Assembly alleged census enumerators not even asking basic questions. She also alleged that census enumerators enlisted her second language as 'Nepali', when told them to write down 'Gurung'. She also demanded that the census should be conducted by local government.

It has also been reported that census enumerators were chased away in Saptari, Siraha and Dhanusha of Madhesh Province. Many people from the Dalit community reported of having to lie about their caste due to the fear of eviction by the landlords.

The final census report of Nepal Census did not included data of Kuti, Gunji and Nabi villages of the Kalapani area, which was included in the preliminary census report released in January 2022.

== See also ==
- Census in Nepal
