= 1961 Nepal census =

6th national census of Nepal

1961 Nepal Census
- 1961

General information
- Country: Nepal
- Authority: Central Bureau of Statistics
- Website: www.cbs.gov.np

Results
- Total population: 9,412,996 (▲14.01%)

The 1961 Nepal census was the 6th national census of Nepal. It was the first census conducted by Central Bureau of Statistics after its establishment in 1958. According to the census the total population of Nepal was 9,412,996.

This census was followed by the 1971 Nepal census.

== Key findings ==
The key findings of 1961 census are as follows:

Total population	9,412,996
Intercensal change	1,156,371
Intercensal change percentage	14.01%
Annual growth rate	1.64%
Population density (per km^{2})	64.0
Male population	4,636,033
Female population	4,776,963
Gender ratio	97.0
Literacy rate	8.9%

== Population distribution ==
Population by ecological region (1961)
Ecological region	Population	Percentage (%)
Mountain & Hill	5,991,297	63.6
Terai (Note: Including Inner Terai)	3,421,699	36.4
Nepal	9,412,996	100

Population by region (1961)
Region	Population	Percentage (%)
Eastern Hills	1,886,722	20.04
Eastern Inner Terai	193,666	2.06
Eastern Terai	2,213,282	23.51
Kathmandu Valley	459,990	4.89
Central Inner Terai	244,236	2.59
Western Hills	1,946,502	20.68
Western Inner Terai	98,607	1.05
Western Terai	400,357	4.25
Far Western Hills	1,698,083	18.04
Far Western Terai	271,551	2.88
Nepal	9,412,996	100

== Population by district ==
Population by district (1961)
S.N	Region	District name	District name in Nepali	Population
1	Eastern Hills	Kabhrepalanchok	काभ्रेपलाञ्चोक	216,440
2	Eastern Hills	Sindhupalchok	सिन्धुपाल्चोक	186,492
3	Eastern Hills	Dolakha	दोलखा	132,112
4	Eastern Hills	Chisankhu (Ramechhap)	चिसङ्खु (रामेछाप)	123,357
5	Eastern Hills	Chisankhu (Okhaldhunga)	चिसङ्खु (ओखलढुङ्गा)	164,429
6	Eastern Hills	Majhkirat	माझकिरात	128,404
7	Eastern Hills	Bhojpur	भोजपुर	252,660
8	Eastern Hills	Chhathum	छथूम	135,351
9	Eastern Hills	Tehrathum	तेह्रथूम	422,952
10	Eastern Hills	Ilam	इलाम	124,525
11	Eastern Inner Terai	Udayapur	उदयपुर	89,429
12	Eastern Inner Terai	Sindhuligadhi	सिन्धुलीगढी	104,237
13	Eastern Terai	Jhapa	झापा	119,700
14	Eastern Terai	Biratnagar	विराटनगर	325,645
15	Eastern Terai	Hanumannagar	हनुमाननगर	299,869
16	Eastern Terai	Siraha	सिराहा	210,532
17	Eastern Terai	Mahottari	महोत्तरी	488,218
18	Eastern Terai	Sarlahi	सर्लाही	162,979
19	Eastern Terai	Rautahat	रौतहट	218,661
20	Eastern Terai	Bara	बारा	250,054
21	Eastern Terai	Parsa	पर्सा	137,624
22	Kathmandu Valley	Kathmandu	काठमाडौँ	224,867
23	Kathmandu Valley	Lalitpur	ललितपुर	145,301
24	Kathmandu Valley	Bhaktapur	भक्तपुर	89,822
25	Central Inner Terai	Chisapanigadhi	चिसापानीगढी	158,530
26	Central Inner Terai	Chitawan	चितवन	67,882
27	Central Inner Terai	Nawalpur	नवलपुर	17,824
28	Western Hills	Nuwakot	नुवाकोट	162,981
29	Western Hills	Dhading	धादिङ	203,039
30	Western Hills	Gorkha	गोरखा	151,264
31	Western Hills	Tanahun	तनहुँ	127,642
32	Western Hills	Lamjung	लम्जुङ	130,935
33	Western Hills	Kaski	कास्की	127,515
34	Western Hills	Syangja	स्याङ्जा	339,634
35	Western Hills	Baglung	बाग्लुङ	228,769
36	Western Hills	Gulmi	गुल्मी	301,730
37	Western Hills	Palpa	पाल्पा	172,993
38	Western Inner Terai	Dang	दाङ	55,858
39	Western Inner Terai	Deukhuri	देउखुरी	42,749
40	Western Terai	Palhi	पाल्ही	96,227
41	Western Terai	Majhkhanda	माझखण्ड	141,627
42	Western Terai	Khajahani	खजहनी	125,036
43	Western Terai	Shivaraj	शिवराज	37,467
44	Far Western Hills	Pyuthan	प्यूठान	212,481
45	Far Western Hills	Salyan	सल्यान	415,524
46	Far Western Hills	Jumla	जुम्ला	184,505
47	Far Western Hills	Dailekh	दैलेख	208,745
48	Far Western Hills	Achham	अछाम	152,520
49	Far Western Hills	Doti	डोटी	282,637
50	Far Western Hills	Baitadi	बैतडी	158,962
51	Far Western Hills	Dadeldhura	डडेल्धुरा	82,709
52	Far Western Terai	Banke	बाँके	95,148
53	Far Western Terai	Bardiya	बर्दिया	67,731
54	Far Western Terai	Kailali	कैलाली	89,795
55	Far Western Terai	Kanchanpur	कञ्चनपुर	18,877
Nepal			नेपाल	9,412,996

== Population by language ==
Languages by number of native speakers (1961)
S.N.	Language	Number of speakers	Percentage (%)
1	Nepali	4,796,528	50.96
2	Maithili	1,130,401	12.01
3	Bhojpuri	577,357	6.13
4	Tamang	518,812	5.51
5	Awadhi	447,090	4.75
6	Tharu	406,907	4.32
7	Newar	377,727	4.01
8	Magar	254,675	2.71
9	Rai, Kirat	239,749	2.54
10	Gurung	157,778	1.68
11	Limbu	138,705	1.47
12	Bhote, Sherpa	84,229	0.89
13	Morang dialects (Note: Dehati (Rural Terai) dialect spoken in Biratnagar and Jhapa. Included in Maithili in later censuses.)	83,986	0.89
14	Rajbanshi	55,803	0.59
15	Satar	18,840	0.20
16	Sunuwar	13,362	0.14
17	Danuwar	11,624	0.12
18	Santhali	10,645	0.11
19	Bengali	9,915	0.11
20	Chepang	9,247	0.10
21	Jhangar	9,140	0.10
22	Thami	9,049	0.10
23	Dhimal	8,188	0.09
24	Marwadi	6,716	0.07
25	Majhi	5,895	0.06
26	Thakali	4,134	0.04
27	Pahari	3,002	0.03
28	Hindi	2,867	0.03
29	Jirel	2,757	0.03
30	Urdu	2,650	0.03
31	Kumal	1,724	0.02
32	Darai	1,645	0.02
33	Lepcha/Lapche	1,272	0.01
34	Meche	938	0.01
35	Raji	801	0.01
36	Odiya	782	0.01
Others		1,627	0.02
Not stated		6,432	0.07
Total		9,412,996	100

== See also ==
- Census in Nepal
- 1952−54 Nepal census
- 1971 Nepal census
