= 1971 Nepal census =

7th national census of Nepal

1971 Nepal Census
- 1971
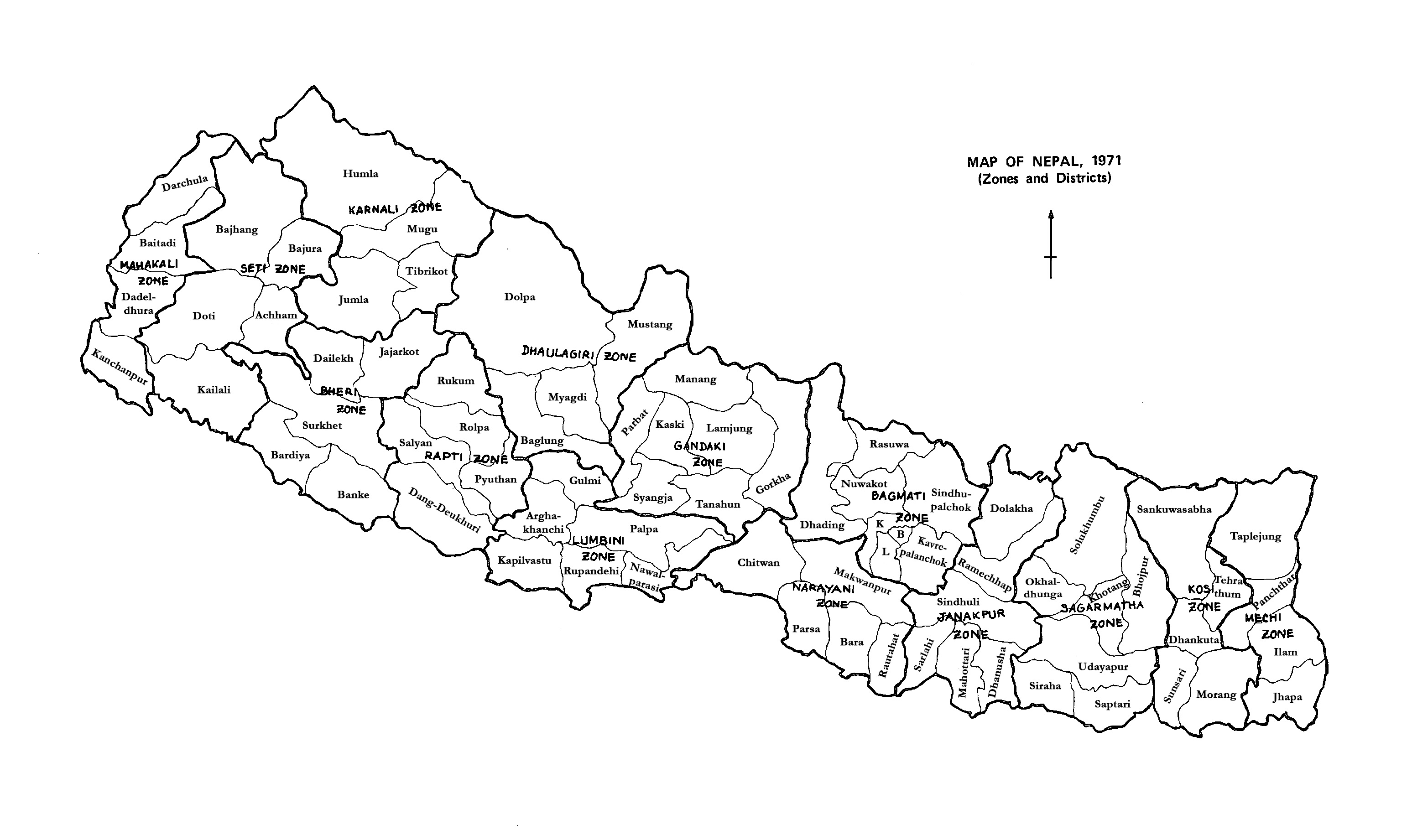
- Map of Nepal (1971)

General information
- Country: Nepal
- Authority: Central Bureau of Statistics
- Website: www.cbs.gov.np

Results
- Total population: 11,555,983 (▲22.77%)
- Most populous Zone: Bagmati (1,496,971)
- Least populous Zone: Karnali (188,012))

The 1971 Nepal census was the 7th national census of Nepal. It was conducted by Central Bureau of Statistics. It was the first census to be conducted after the division of Nepal into 14 zones and 75 districts in 1962. It was also the first census to use computer for data processing. According to the census the total population of Nepal was 11,555,983.

This census was followed by the 1981 Nepal census.

== Key findings ==
The key findings of 1971 census are as follows:

Total population	11,555,983
Intercensal change	2,142,987
Intercensal change percentage	22.77%
Annual growth rate	2.05%
Population density (per km^{2})	78.5
Male population	5,817,203
Female population	5,738,780
Gender ratio	101.4
Literacy rate	13.9%

== Population distribution ==
Population by ecological region (1971)
Ecological region	Population	Percentage (%)	Density (per km^{2})
Mountain	1,138,610	9.9	22
Hill	6,071,407	52.5	99
Terai	4,345,966	37.6	128
Nepal	11,555,983	100	79

Population by zone (1971)
S.N	Zone	Population	Percentage (%)	Density (per km^{2})
1	Mechi	617,760	5.35	86
2	Koshi	866,260	7.50	106
3	Sagarmatha	1,313,480	11.37	104
4	Janakpur	1,265,755	10.95	138
5	Bagmati	1,496,971	12.95	140
6	Narayani	1,103,027	9.55	132
7	Gandaki	1,023,110	8.85	84
8	Dhaulagiri	276,729	2.39	18
9	Lumbini	1,165,701	10.10	130
10	Rapti	705,813	6.11	72
11	Bheri	575,071	4.98	55
12	Karnali	188,012	1.63	14
13	Seti	597,124	5.17	48
14	Mahakali	361,170	3.13	53
Nepal		11,555,983	100	79

In 1972, Nepal was divided into four development regions by grouping zones. Population figures for those development regions are as follows:

Development region	Population	Percentage (%)	Density (per km^{2})
Eastern	2,797,500	24.21	100
Central	3,865,753	33.45	137
Western	2,465,540	21.34	68
Far Western (Note: In 1980, Mid Western Development Region was carved out of Far Western Development Region, making total number of development regions 5.)	2,427,190	21.00	46
Nepal	11,555,983	100	79

== Population by district ==
Population by district (1971)
S.N	Zone	District	Population	Density (per km^{2})
1	Mechi	Taplejung	84,715	28
2	Mechi	Panchthar	145,809	121
3	Mechi	Ilam	139,538	91
4	Mechi	Jhapa	247,698	172
5	Koshi	Sankhuwasabha	114,313	36
6	Koshi	Tehrathum	119,307	135
7	Koshi	Dhankuta	107,649	120
8	Koshi	Morang	301,557	154
9	Koshi	Sunsari	223,434	188
10	Sagarmatha	Solukhumbu	105,324	28
11	Sagarmatha	Bhojpur (Note: Moved to Koshi Zone in 1975)	194,506	97
12	Sagarmatha	Khotang	163,297	146
13	Sagarmatha	Okhaldhunga	122,862	112
14	Sagarmatha	Udayapur	112,622	50
15	Sagarmatha	Saptari	312,565	226
16	Sagarmatha	Siraha	302,304	287
17	Janakpur	Dolakha	130,022	65
18	Janakpur	Ramechhap	157,349	98
19	Janakpur	Sindhuli	147,409	63
20	Janakpur	Dhanusha	330,601	291
21	Janakpur	Mahottari	324,831	274
22	Janakpur	Sarlahi	175,543	197
23	Bagmati	Sindhupalchok	206,384	81
24	Bagmati	Rasuwa	17,517	14
25	Bagmati	Nuwakot	172,718	143
26	Bagmati	Dhading	236,276	75
27	Bagmati	Kavrepalanchok	245,165	168
28	Bagmati	Kathmandu	353,756	647
29	Bagmati	Lalitpur	154,998	393
30	Bagmati	Bhaktapur	110,157	831
31	Narayani	Makwanpur	163,766	73
32	Narayani	Chitwan	183,644	73
33	Narayani	Rautahat	320,093	293
34	Narayani	Bara	233,401	185
35	Narayani	Parsa	202,123	160
36	Gandaki	Manang	7,436	4
37	Gandaki	Gorkha	178,265	69
38	Gandaki	Lamjung	140,226	65
39	Gandaki	Kaski	151,749	118
40	Gandaki	Parbat (Note: Moved to Dhaulagiri Zone in 1975)	118,689	95
41	Gandaki	Tanahun	158,139	106
42	Gandaki	Syangja	268,606	208
43	Lumbini	Palpa	212,633	90
44	Lumbini	Gulmi	227,746	181
45	Lumbini	Arghakhanchi	130,212	95
46	Lumbini	Nawalparasi	146,548	118
47	Lumbini	Rupandehi	243,346	205
48	Lumbini	Kapilvastu	205,216	133
49	Dhaulagiri	Mustang	26,944	8
50	Dhaulagiri	Dolpa (Note: Moved to Karnali Zone in 1975)	19,110	2
51	Dhaulagiri	Myagdi	57,946	38
52	Dhaulagiri	Baglung	172,729	78
53	Rapti	Rukum	96,243	52
54	Rapti	Rolpa	162,955	96
55	Rapti	Salyan	141,457	75
56	Rapti	Pyuthan	137,338	99
57	Rapti	Dang	167,820	56
58	Karnali	Humla	29,524	5
59	Karnali	Mugu	25,718	8
60	Karnali	Tibrikot (Note: In 1975, Tibrikot District was merged with Jumla District. At the same time new district of Kalikot was carved out of western part of Jumla District, thus keeping the total number of districts 75.)	10,017	7
61	Karnali	Jumla	122,753	43
62	Bheri	Jajarkot	86,564	39
63	Bheri	Dailekh	156,072	95
64	Bheri	Surkhet	104,933	33
65	Bheri	Banke	125,709	67
66	Bheri	Bardiya	101,793	65
67	Seti	Bajura	61,342	29
68	Seti	Bajhang	108,623	38
69	Seti	Achham	132,212	57
70	Seti	Doti	166,070	100
71	Seti	Kailali	128,877	45
72	Mahakali	Darchula	68,868	38
73	Mahakali	Baitadi	128,696	72
74	Mahakali	Dadeldhura	94,743	61
75	Mahakali	Kanchanpur	68,863	43
Nepal			11,555,983	79

== Population by language ==
Languages by number of native speakers (1971)
S.N.	Language	Number of speakers	Percentage (%)
1	Nepali	6,060,758	52.45
2	Maithili	1,327,242	11.49
3	Bhojpuri	806,480	6.98
4	Tharu	495,881	4.29
5	Tamang	555,056	4.80
6	Newar	454,979	3.94
7	Awadhi	316,950	2.74
8	Magar	288,383	2.50
9	Rai, Kirat	232,264	2.01
10	Gurung	171,609	1.49
11	Limbu	170,787	1.48
12	Bhote, Sherpa	79,218	0.69
13	Rajbanshi	55,124	0.48
14	Satar	20,660	0.18
15	Sunuwar	20,380	0.18
16	Danuwar	9,959	0.09
17	Santhali	3,193	0.03
Local district languages		394,374	3.41
Other languages		92,686	0.80
Total		11,555,983	100

== See also ==
- Census in Nepal
- 1961 Nepal census
- 1981 Nepal census
