= 1911 Nepal census =

First national census of Nepal

1911 Nepal Census
- 1911

General information
- Country: Nepal

Results
- Total population: 5,638,749

The 1911 Nepal census was the first official national census in the history of Nepal. It was conducted during the period of Rana Prime Minister Chandra Shumsher. The government issued an official order to the people through Istihar (government notification) to cooperate with the enumerators who were to visit door to door for census enumeration. Patwaris (land revenue collectors) were engaged in data collection all over the country. The census had established a milestone in the tradition of census taking in Nepal. It recorded a total population of 5,573,788.

== Key findings ==
The key findings of 1911 census are as follows:

Total population	5,638,749
Male population	2,820,220
Female population	2,818,529
Gender ratio	100.1
Population density (per km^{2})	38.3

== Population distribution ==
Population by region (1911)
Region	Population	Percentage (%)
Eastern Hill	1,321,511	23.44
Kathmandu Valley	290,879	5.16
Western Hill	1,971,400	34.96
Terai	2,054,959	36.44
Nepal	5,638,749	100

== See also ==
- Census in Nepal
- 1920 Nepal census
