= List of monuments in Dadeldhura, Nepal =

Update on Dadeldhura District Monument

This is a list of monuments in Dadeldhura District, Nepal as officially recognized by and available through the website of the Department of Archaeology, Nepal. Dadeldhura is a district of Sudurpashchim Province and is located in western Nepal. Hindu temples are the main attraction of this district.

== List of monuments ==
ID	Name	Type	Location	District	Coordinates	Image
NP-DD-01	Dibyapurka Dewals			Dadeldhura		Dibyapurka Dewals Upload Photo
NP-DD-02	Manilek Dewals			Dadeldhura		Upload Photo Upload Photo
NP-DD-03	Jannath Temple			Dadeldhura		Upload Photo Upload Photo
NP-DD-04	Ajaimerukot		Ajaymeru	Dadeldhura		Ajaimerukot Upload Photo
NP-DD-05	Hatgaunka Dewal			Dadeldhura		Upload Photo Upload Photo
NP-DD-06	Birkhmbako Dharmasala			Dadeldhura		Upload Photo Upload Photo
NP-DD-07	Koteliko Dewal			Dadeldhura		Upload Photo Upload Photo
NP-DD-08	Amargadhi Fort			Dadeldhura		Amargadhi Fort Upload Photo
NP-DD-09	Nilpnal Temple			Dadeldhura		Upload Photo Upload Photo
NP-DD-10	Conference Stage of Chipur			Dadeldhura		Upload Photo Upload Photo
NP-DD-11	Dharmasala Amargadhi 1			Dadeldhura		Upload Photo Upload Photo
NP-DD-12	Gorel Bhagawati Temple			Dadeldhura		Upload Photo Upload Photo
NP-DD-13	Bhudhi Ghatal			Dadeldhura		Upload Photo Upload Photo
NP-DD-14	Khujakot			Dadeldhura		Upload Photo Upload Photo
NP-DD-15	Dageshor Temple			Dadeldhura		Upload Photo Upload Photo
NP-DD-16	Dadeldhura Fort			Dadeldhura		Upload Photo Upload Photo
NP-DD-17	Dudeshor Temple			Dadeldhura		Upload Photo Upload Photo
NP-DD-18	Ugratara Bhagabati Temple			Dadeldhura		Ugratara Bhagabati Temple Upload Photo

== See also ==
- List of monuments in Sudurpashchim Province
- List of monuments in Nepal
