= 1952−54 Nepal census =

5th national census of Nepal

1952−54 Nepal Census
- 1952−54
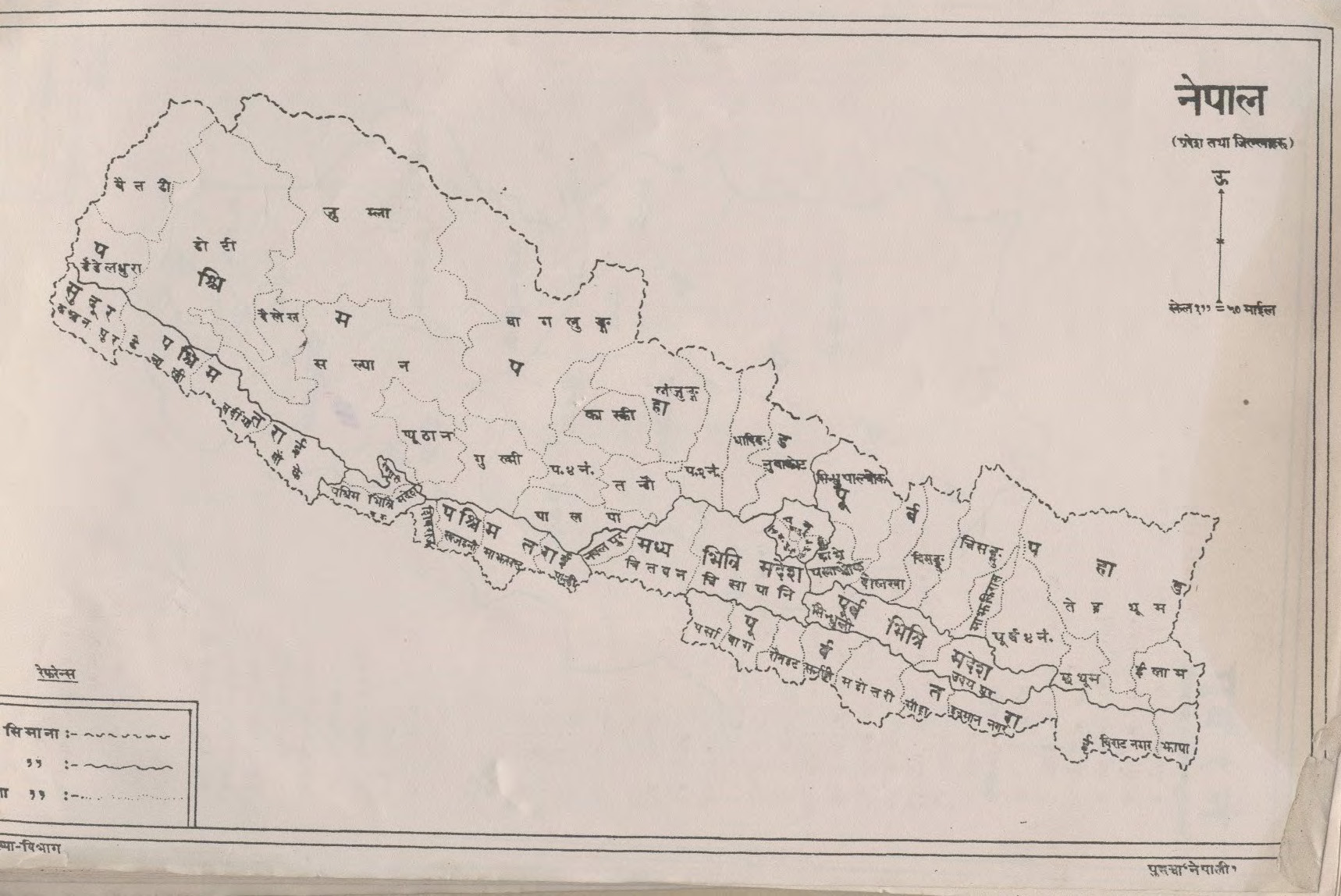
- Map of Nepal (1952)

General information
- Country: Nepal
- Authority: Department of Statistics

Results
- Total population: 8,256,625 (▲31.40%)

The 1952−54 Nepal census was the 5th national census and first modern census of Nepal. It was conducted after the advent of the democracy in 1951. The census recorded a total population of 8,256,625.

The census was conducted by the then Department of Statistics (Sankhya Bibhag) that had been established in 1950. The department was established with a core of five officers who had received training on census methods at the International Training Center on Censuses and Statistics sponsored by the United Nations and the Government of India, in New Delhi in 1949.

The census was planned taking into consideration the concepts recommended by the U.N. for the world census of 1950. The Census was carried out in two stages: the Eastern part of the country except Mahottari District was enumerated in 1952 whereas the Western part and Mahottari District were enumerated in 1954.

== Key findings ==
The key findings of 1952−54 census are as follows:

Total population	8,256,625
Intercensal change	1,972,976
Intercensal change percentage	31.40%
Annual growth rate	2.27%
Population density (per km^{2})	56.1
Male population	4,050,607 (Note: 21,546 individual census schedules were damaged by rain during transport and therefore excluded from tabulations of many individual and economic characteristics.)
Female population	4,184,472
Gender ratio	96.8
Literacy rate	5.3%

== Population distribution ==
Population by ecological region (1952−54)
Ecological region	Population	Percentage (%)
Mountain & Hill	5,349,988	64.8
Terai (Note: Including Inner Terai)	2,906,637	35.2
Nepal	8,256,625	100

There were nine regions in Nepal during the time of 1952−54 census. Population figures for those regions are as follows:

Population by region (1952−54)
Region	Population	Percentage (%)
Eastern Hills	1,708,816	20.70
Eastern Inner Terai	189,228	2.29
Eastern Terai	1,806,049	21.87
Kathmandu Valley	410,995	4.98
Central Inner Terai	239,677	2.90
Western Hills	3,229,177	39.11
Western Inner Terai	89,315	1.08
Western Terai	348,179	4.22
Far Western Terai	235,189	2.85
Nepal	8,256,625	100

== Population by district ==
The census districts of 1952−54 census were based on revenue districts, known as Mal or Ilaka. However, some census district boundaries differed from the actual revenue district boundaries because of unclear boundary demarcation or to facilitate enumeration where parts of a district were more easily accessible from a neighboring district. Some revenue districts were split into two census districts. For the census purposes, the districts of Kathmandu Valley were further subdivided into urban and rural blocks.

Population by district (1952−54)
S.N	Region	District name	District name in Nepali	Population
1	Eastern Hills	Sindhupalchok	सिन्धुपाल्चोक	174,630
2	Eastern Hills	Kabhrepalanchok	काभ्रेपलाञ्चोक	187,685
3	Eastern Hills	Dolakha	दोलखा	125,384
4	Eastern Hills	Chisankhu (Ramechhap)	चिसङ्खु (रामेछाप)	116,577
5	Eastern Hills	Chisankhu (Okhaldhunga)	चिसङ्खु (ओखलढुङ्गा)	145,147
6	Eastern Hills	Majhkirat	माझकिरात	120,168
7	Eastern Hills	Bhojpur	भोजपुर	229,231
8	Eastern Hills	Dhankuta (Tehrathum) (Note: Including parts of Ilam)	धनकुटा (तेह्रथूम)	375,246
9	Eastern Hills	Dhankuta (Chhathum)	धनकुटा (छथूम)	121,900
10	Eastern Hills	Ilam	इलाम	112,848
11	Eastern Inner Terai	Sindhuli	सिन्धुली	100,663
12	Eastern Inner Terai	Udayapur	उदयपुर	88,565
13	Eastern Terai	Parsa	पर्सा	114,107
14	Eastern Terai	Bara	बारा	210,007
15	Eastern Terai	Rautahat	रौतहट	189,223
16	Eastern Terai	Sarlahi	सर्लाही	134,340
17	Eastern Terai	Mahottari	महोत्तरी	418,436
18	Eastern Terai	Saptari (Siraha)	सप्तरी (सिराहा)	176,747
19	Eastern Terai	Saptari (Hanumannagar)	सप्तरी (हनुमाननगर)	254,285
20	Eastern Terai	Biratnagar	विराटनगर	228,746
21	Eastern Terai	Jhapa	झापा	80,158
22	Kathmandu Valley	Kathmandu (urban)	काठमाडौँ (शहर)	105,247
23	Kathmandu Valley	Kathmandu (rural)	काठमाडौँ (गाँउ)	88,535
24	Kathmandu Valley	Lalitpur (urban)	ललितपुर (शहर)	41,334
25	Kathmandu Valley	Lalitpur (rural)	ललितपुर (गाँउ)	92,419
26	Kathmandu Valley	Bhaktapur (urban)	भक्तपुर (शहर)	32,118
27	Kathmandu Valley	Bhaktapur (rural)	भक्तपुर (गाँउ)	51,342
28	Central Inner Terai	Chisapani (Note: Including parts of Dhading and Lalitpur)	चिसापानी	180,554
29	Central Inner Terai	Chitawan	चितवन	42,724
30	Central Inner Terai	Nawalpur	नवलपुर	16,399
31	Western Hills	Nuwakot	नुवाकोट	147,496
32	Western Hills	Dhading	धादिङ	133,562
33	Western Hills	Gorkha	गोरखा	135,975
34	Western Hills	Tanahun	तनहुँ	113,677
35	Western Hills	Lamjung	लम्जुङ	125,329
36	Western Hills	Kaski	कास्की	111,747
37	Western Hills	Syangja	स्याङ्जा	317,785
38	Western Hills	Palpa	पाल्पा	147,551
39	Western Hills	Gulmi	गुल्मी	272,805
40	Western Hills	Baglung	बाग्लुङ	207,538
41	Western Hills	Pyuthan	प्यूठान	198,138
42	Western Hills	Salyan	सल्यान	375,507
43	Western Hills	Dailekh	दैलेख	259,834
44	Western Hills	Jumla	जुम्ला	165,298
45	Western Hills	Doti	डोटी	315,168
46	Western Hills	Baitadi	बैतडी	132,148
47	Western Hills	Dadeldhura	डडेल्धुरा	69,619
48	Western Inner Terai	Deukhuri	देउखुरी	38,789
49	Western Inner Terai	Dang	दाङ	50,526
50	Western Terai	Palhi	पाल्ही	81,158
51	Western Terai	Majhkhanda	माझखण्ड	117,575
52	Western Terai	Khajahani	खजहनी	116,039
53	Western Terai	Shivaraj	शिवराज	33,407
54	Far Western Terai	Banke	बाँके	82,449
55	Far Western Terai	Bardiya	बर्दिया	58,389
56	Far Western Terai	Kailali	कैलाली	76,606
57	Far Western Terai	Kanchanpur	कञ्चनपुर	17,745
Nepal			नेपाल	8,256,625

== Population by language ==
The 1952−54 census recorded details for 53 languages/dialects but final tabulations were made only for 36 languages. There were significant problems while collecting details of Terai languages. Often the answer for the question about language was Dehati, which is not an actual language rather a generic term for rural dialects of various languages spoken in Terai region. These Dehati (rural Terai) dialects were classified according to the region.

Languages by number of native speakers (1952−54)
S.N.	Language	Number of native speakers	Percentage (%)
1	Nepali	4,013,567	48.74
2	Maithili Pradesh Dialects (Note: Dehati (rural Terai) dialects) (Note: Dialects spoken in the districts of Hannumanagar, Siraha, Mahottari and Sarlahi.)	617,443	7.50
4	Tamang/Lama	494,745	6.01
5	Eastern Terai Dialects (Note: Dialects spoken in the districts of Rautahat, Bara and Parsa.)	460,946	5.60
6	Newari	383,184	4.65
7	Tharu	359,594	4.37
8	Maithili	300,768	3.65
9	Magar	273,780	3.32
10	Western Terai Dialects	259,015	3.15
11	Rai Kirat	236,049	2.87
12	Gurung	162,192	1.97
13	Limbu	145,511	1.77
14	Morang Pradesh Dialects (Note: Dialects spoken in the districts of Jhapa and Biratnagar.)	106,569	1.29
15	Hindi	80,181	0.97
16	Bhote, Sherpa	70,132	0.85
17	Far Western Terai Dialects	69,446	0.84
18	Rajbanshi/Tajpuriya	35,543	0.43
19	Urdu	32,545	0.40
20	Sunuwar	17,299	0.21
21	Satar	16,751	0.20
22	Bhojpuri	16,335	0.20
23	Chepang	14,261	0.17
24	Thami	10,240	0.12
25	Bengali	9,375	0.11
26	Danuwar	9,138	0.11
27	Majhi	5,729	0.07
28	Dhimal	5,671	0.07
29	Jhangar	4,812	0.06
30	Marwadi	4,244	0.05
31	Kumhale/Kumal	3,510	0.04
32	Thakali	3,307	0.04
33	Darai	3,084	0.04
34	Jirel	2,721	0.03
35	Byansi	1,786	0.02
36	Raji	1,514	0.02
Other languages		3,340	0.04
Unknown		752	0.01
Total		8,235,079	100

== See also ==
- Census in Nepal
- 1961 Nepal census
- 1941–42 Nepal census
