= 1920 Nepal census =

2nd national census of Nepal

1920 Nepal Census
- 1920

General information
- Country: Nepal

Results
- Total population: 5,573,788 (▼-1.15%)

The 1920 Nepal census was the second national census of Nepal. It was conducted 9 years after the first census. It recorded a total population of 5,573,788.

The census showed the decline in population compared to the previous census. The decrease in population has been attributed to the 1918–1920 influenza pandemic and the deaths of Nepali soldiers who fought from the British side during First World War.

== Key findings ==
The key findings of 1920 census are as follows:

Total population	5,573,788
Intercensal change	-64,961
Intercensal change percentage	-1.15%
Annual growth rate	-0.13%
Population density (per km^{2})	37.9
Male population	2,800,042 (Note: The reported male and female populations do not add up to the stated total population.)
Female population	2,774,714
Gender ratio	100.9

== Population distribution ==
Population by region (1920)
Region	Population	Percentage (%)
Eastern Hill	1,209,086	21.69
Eastern Inner Terai	48,913	0.88
Eastern Terai	1,475,112	26.47
Kathmandu Valley	306,909	5.51
Central Inner Terai	137,137	2.46
Western Hill	1,935,757	34.73
Western Terai	306,864	5.51
Far Western Terai	154,010	2.76
Nepal	5,573,788	100

== Population by district ==
Population by district (1920)
Region	District	Population
Eastern Hill	East No. 1 (Chautara)	213,703
Eastern Hill	East No. 2 (Ramechhap)	177,072
Eastern Hill	East No. 3 (Okhaldhunga)	108,106
Eastern Hill	East No. 4 (Bhojpur)	269,668
Eastern Hill	Dhankuta	353,062
Eastern Hill	Ilam	87,475
Eastern Inner Terai	Sindhuli (Note: Different parts of Sindhuli were enumerated under its neighbouring districts.)	N/A
Eastern Inner Terai	Udayapur	48,913
Eastern Terai	Parsa-Bara-Rautahat	414,657
Eastern Terai	Sarlahi-Mahottari	471,292
Eastern Terai	Saptari	377,855
Eastern Terai	Morang	211,308
Kathmandu Valley	Kathmandu	108,805
Kathmandu Valley	Lalitpur	93,176
Kathmandu Valley	Bhaktapur	104,928
Central Inner Terai	Chisapani	116,617
Central Inner Terai	Chitawan	20,520
Western Hill	West No. 1 (Nuwakot)	174,810
Western Hill	West No. 2 (Gorkha)	79,203
Western Hill	West No. 3 (Pokhara)	221,725
Western Hill	West No. 4 (Syangja)	183,417
Western Hill	Palpa (including Gulmi & Baglung)	376,900
Western Hill	Pyuthan	122,063
Western Hill	Dang-Salyan	292,733
Western Hill	Dailekh (including Surkhet)	101,500
Western Hill	Jumla	89,022
Western Hill	Doti	216,489
Western Hill	Baitadi-Dadeldhura	77,895
Western Terai	Palhi-Majhkhanda	184,581
Western Terai	Khajahani-Shivaraj	122,283
Far Western Terai	Banke-Bardiya	107,194
Far Western Terai	Kailali-Kanchanpur	46,816
Nepal		5,573,788

== See also ==
- Census in Nepal
- 1930 Nepal census
- 1911 Nepal census
