= Malikarjun Temple =

Temple in Nepal

Shree Shailya Shikhar Malikarjun Temple
- मालिकार्जुन मन्दिर

Religion
- Affiliation: Hinduism
- District: Darchula District
- Festival: Gaura Festival

Location
- Location: MalikarjunVDC
- State: Sudurpashchim Province
- Country: Nepal

Specifications
- Temple: 1
- Monument: 4

Situated 46 km (29 mi) from Khalanga in Malikarjun VDC, the Malikarjun Temple contains idols of Lord Shiva and Goddess Parvati.Malika is worshipped as Parbati while Arjun represents Shiva. Devotees throng this temple every year during the months of Ashadh and Kartik by Nepali calendar. Gaura Festival is also celebrated here with highly population of darchula in this temple. This temple is also famous for a journey which is done by walking a long and ending it in this temple. It is very famous in Darchula District. & Sudurpashchim Province
