= 1930 Nepal census =

3rd national census of Nepal

1930 Nepal Census
- 1930

General information
- Country: Nepal

Results
- Total population: 5,532,574 (▼-0.74%)

The 1930 Nepal census was the third national census of Nepal. It was conducted during a time of war rhetoric and preparation between Nepal and Tibet. The population count was therefore thought to be grossly undercounted because of the fear of compulsory recruitment in the army. The census recorded a total population of 5,532,574.

Very limited details are known about this census. It was conducted after the death of Prime Minister Chandra Shumsher. His successor, Prime Minister Bhim Shumsher gave limited importance to the census. Thus the census is regarded as mere population listing, conducted primarily to maintain the decennial practice.

== Key findings ==
The key findings of 1930 census are as follows:

| Total population | 5,532,574 |
| Intercensal change | -41,214 |
| Intercensal change percentage | -0.74% |
| Annual growth rate | -0.07% |
| Population density (per km^{2}) | 37.6 |

== Population distribution ==
Population by region (1930)
| Region | Population | Percentage (%) |
|---|---|---|
| Hill | 3,139,854 | 56.75 |
| Terai | 2,130,487 | 38.51 |
| Kathmandu Valley | 262,233 | 4.74 |
| Nepal | 5,532,574 | 100 |

== See also ==
- Census in Nepal
- 1941–42 Nepal census
- 1920 Nepal census
