= 1941–42 Nepal census =

4th national census of Nepal

1941–42 Nepal Census
- 1941–42
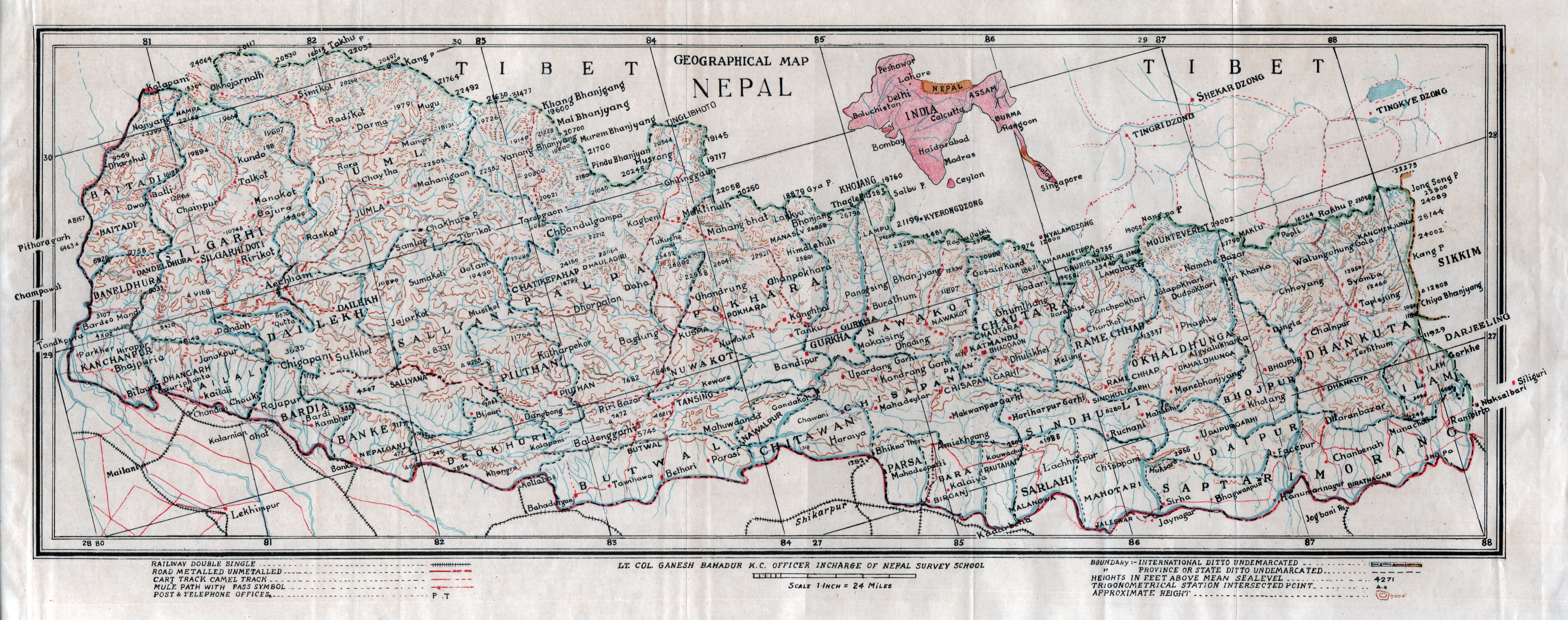
- Map of Nepal (1942)

General information
- Country: Nepal
- Authority: Janasankhya Goswara

Results
- Total population: 6,283,649 (▲13.58%)

The 1941−42 Nepal census was the fourth national census of Nepal. It was the first census conducted by a permanent statistical office named Janasankhya Goswara (Department of Population), during the period of Rana Prime Minister Juddha Shumsher. The department had attempted to improve census coverage by improving the schedule, by recruiting more enumerators and also by reducing the census areas. The census recorded a total population of 6,283,649.

== Key findings ==
The key findings of 1941–42 census are as follows:

Total population	6,283,649
Intercensal change	751,075
Intercensal change percentage	13.58%
Annual growth rate	1.16%
Population density (per km^{2})	42.7
Male population	3,207,709
Female population	3,075,940
Gender ratio	104.3

== Population distribution ==
Population by region
Region	Population	Percentage (%)
Eastern Hill	1,270,589	20.22
Eastern Inner Terai	39,486	0.63
Eastern Terai	1,518,028	24.16
Kathmandu Valley	325,139	5.17
Central Inner Terai	128,790	2.05
Western Hill	2,549,342	40.57
Western Terai	286,262	4.56
Far Western Terai	166,013	2.64
Nepal	6,283,649	100

== Population by district/sub-district ==
Population by district/sub-district (1941-42)
Region	District / sub-district (जिल्ला / इलाका)		Population
Eastern Hill	East No. 1 (Chautara)	Sindhupalchok	134,782
Eastern Hill	East No. 1 (Chautara)	Kavrepalanchok	114,005
Eastern Hill	East No. 2 (Ramechhap)		159,705
Eastern Hill	East No. 3 (Okhaldhunga)		193,002
Eastern Hill	East No. 4 (Bhojpur) (Note: Including Majhkirat Ilaka. It was moved from East No. 4 to East No. 3 around 1923/24 (1980 B.S). However, it was still counted under East No. 4 in the 1941−42 census.)		195,768
Eastern Hill	Dhankuta	Tehrathum	276,461
Eastern Hill	Dhankuta	Chhathum	105,504
Eastern Hill	Ilam		91,362
Eastern Inner Terai	Sindhuli (Note: Most parts of Sindhuli were enumerated under East No. 2 (Ramechhap) except three Thums which were enumerated Mahottari.)		N/A
Eastern Inner Terai	Udayapur		39,486
Eastern Terai	Birgunj	Parsa	104,820
Eastern Terai	Birgunj	Bara	178,624
Eastern Terai	Birgunj	Rautahat	168,226
Eastern Terai	Mahottari-Sarlahi	Mahottari	330,999
Eastern Terai	Mahottari-Sarlahi	Sarlahi	129,944
Eastern Terai	Saptari	Siraha	163,894
Eastern Terai	Saptari	Hanumannagar	200,047
Eastern Terai	Morang	Biratnagar	172,429
Eastern Terai	Morang	Jhapa	69,045
Kathmandu Valley	Kathmandu		124,143 (Note: Including 1803 Nepalese living in Tibet.)
Kathmandu Valley	Lalitpur		119,499
Kathmandu Valley	Bhaktapur		81,497
Central Inner Terai	Chisapani		102,551
Central Inner Terai	Chitawan		26,239
Western Hill	West No. 1 (Nuwakot)	Nuwakot	120,019
Western Hill	West No. 1 (Nuwakot)	Dhading	119,109
Western Hill	West No. 2 (Gorkha)		97,386
Western Hill	West No. 3 (Pokhara)	Tanahun	72,878
Western Hill	West No. 3 (Pokhara)	Lamjung	107,543
Western Hill	West No. 3 (Pokhara)	Kaski	94,358
Western Hill	West No.4 (Syangja)		256,941
Western Hill	Palpa	Palpa	104,720
Western Hill	Palpa	Gulmi-Baglung	371,121
Western Hill	Pyuthan		173,228
Western Hill	Salyan		306,922
Western Hill	Dang (Note: Dang is geographically in Inner Terai region but included in Hill since it was enumerated under Salyan in previous censuses.)		75,341
Western Hill	Jumla		118,896
Western Hill	Dailekh	Dailekh	183,670
Western Hill	Dailekh	Surkhet	26,963
Western Hill	Doti		207,562
Western Hill	Baitadi		75,457
Western Hill	Dadeldhura		37,228
Western Terai (Butwal)	Palhi-Majhkhanda	Palhi (including Nawalpur)	82,227
Western Terai (Butwal)	Palhi-Majhkhanda	Majkhanda	103,846
Western Terai (Butwal)	Khajahani-Shivaraj	Khajahani	69,199
Western Terai (Butwal)	Khajahani-Shivaraj	Shivaraj	30,990
Far Western Terai	Banke-Bardiya	Banke	72,969
Far Western Terai	Banke-Bardiya	Bardiya	43,842
Far Western Terai	Kailali-Kanchanpur	Kailali	37,435
Far Western Terai	Kailali-Kanchanpur	Kanchanpur	11,767
Nepal			6,283,649

== See also ==
- Census in Nepal
- 1952−54 Nepal census
- 1930 Nepal census
