= List of monuments in Darchula, Nepal =

This is a list of monuments in Darchula District, Nepal as officially recognized by and available through the website of the Department of Archaeology, Nepal. Darchula is a district of Sudurpashchim Province and is located in western Nepal. Hindu temples are the main attraction of this district.

== List of monuments ==
ID	Name	Type	Location	District	Coordinates	Image
NP-DH-01	Ukula bhagnabesharu			Darchula		Upload Photo Upload Photo
NP-DH-02	Patika Naula (Bhapi)			Darchula		Upload Photo Upload Photo
NP-DH-03	Latinath Madou (Temple)		Latinath	Darchula		Upload Photo Upload Photo
NP-DH-04	Malikaarjun deewalka Bhagnabesh		Malikarjun	Darchula		Upload Photo Upload Photo
NP-DH-05	Gallakedar Madou Temple			Darchula		Upload Photo Upload Photo
NP-DH-06	Malikaarjun Madou Temple		Malikarjun	Darchula		Upload Photo Upload Photo

== See also ==
- List of monuments in Sudurpashchim Province
- List of monuments in Nepal
