= List of monuments in Sudurpashchim Province =

Sudurpashchim Province (Nepali: सुदुरपश्चिम प्रदेश) is one of the seven federal provinces of Nepal established by the country's new constitution of 20 September 2015, comprising nine districts, namely, Achham, Baitadi, Bajhang, Bajura, Dadeldhura, Darchula, Doti, Kailali and Kanchanpur. This province was formerly known as Province No. 7, and then as Sudurpashchim Pradesh. There are many categorized monuments sites in Sudurpashchim Province. Here are district wise lists of monuments which are in Sudurpashchim Province.

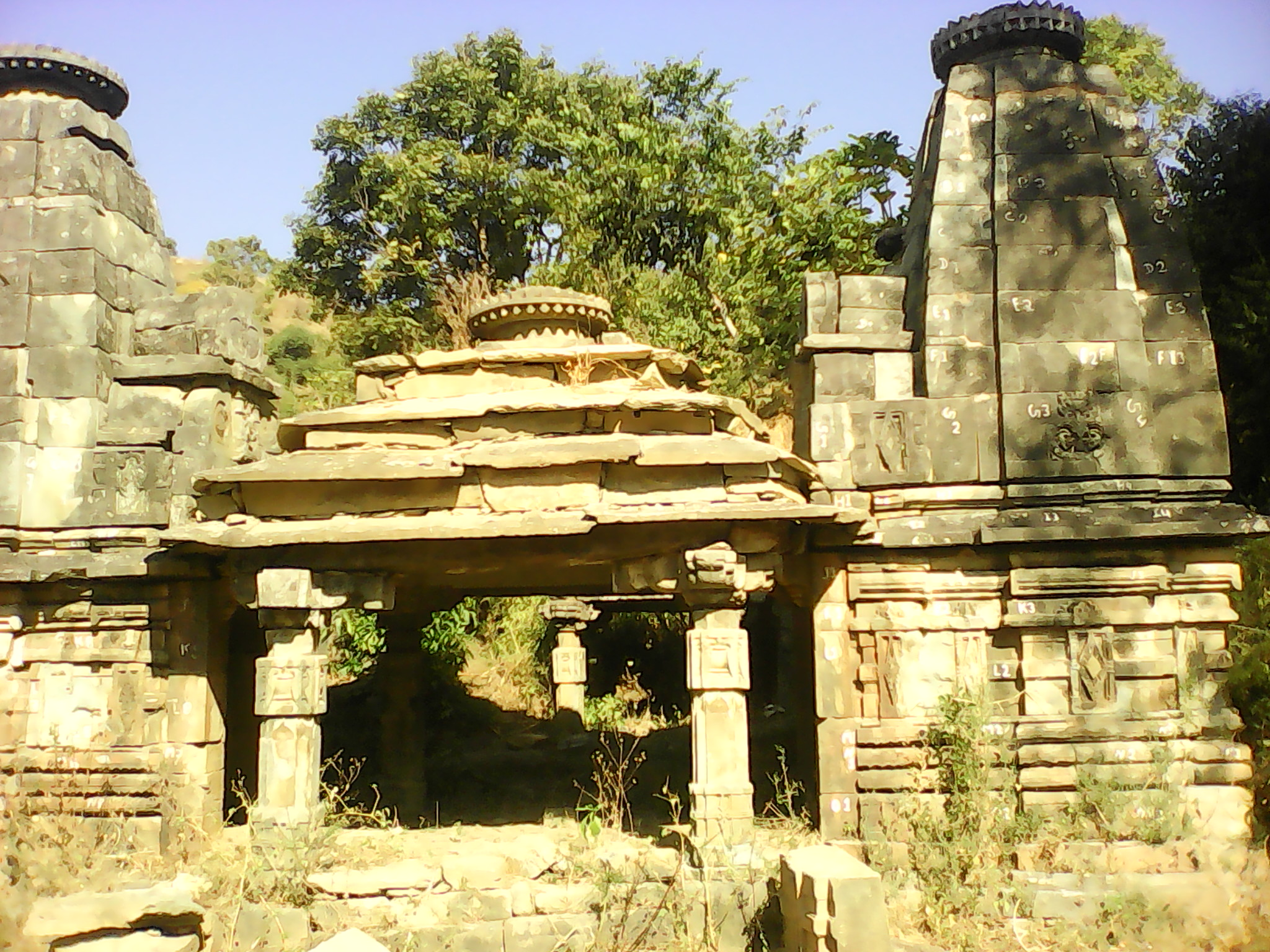
Ajayamerukot

== Lists per district of Sudurpashchim Province ==
- List of monuments in Achham District
- List of monuments in Baitadi District
- List of monuments in Bajhang District
- List of monuments in Bajura District
- List of monuments in Dadeldhura District
- List of monuments in Darchula District
- List of monuments in Doti District
- List of monuments in Kailali District
- List of monuments in Kanchanpur District
