= List of monuments in Kailali, Nepal =

This is a list of monuments in Kailali District, Nepal as officially recognized by and available through the website of the Department of Archaeology, Nepal. Kailali is a district of Sudurpashchim Province and is located in south-western Nepal. During Rana Rule there were four Bazzar Adda (market center) - Sati, Bajani, Kailali, and Dhangadhi. Rana palaces and Hindu temples are the main attraction of this district.

== List of monuments ==
ID	Name	Type	Location	District	Coordinates	Image
NP-KAI-01	Garva Palace			Kailali		Upload Photo Upload Photo
NP-KAI-02	Dhangadhi Palace			Kailali		Upload Photo Upload Photo
NP-KAI-03	Narindra Padma Prakashwer Temple			Kailali		Upload Photo Upload Photo
NP-KAI-04	Bardagoriyababa Temple			Kailali		Upload Photo Upload Photo

== See also ==
- List of monuments in Sudurpashchim Province
- List of monuments in Nepal
