= Nepal Indigenous Nationalities Students' Federation =

NINSF symbol

Nepal Indigenous Nationalities Students' Federation (Nepali: नेपाल आदिवासी जनजाती विद्यार्थी महासंघ) is a janajati students movement in Nepal, linked to the Nepal Federation of Indigenous Nationalities.

The second national convention of NINSF was held in January 2006. As of 2010, Nabin Wanem Limbu was the chairman of NINSF. As of 2011 Dozang Sherpa served as the vice chairman of the organization, Arjun Yakkha as its secretary and Dekendra Rai as its treasurer.
