= Latinath =

Latinath Chapakhana लाटीनाथ
- Village development committee
- Location in Nepal
- Coordinates: 29.72°N 80.77°E
- Country: Nepal
- Zone: Mahakali Zone
- District: Darchula District

Population (1991)
  - Total: 3,392
- Time zone: UTC+5:45 (Nepal Time)

Latinath is a village development committee in Darchula District in the Mahakali Zone of western Nepal. At the time of the 1991 Nepal census it had a population of 3392 people living in 587 individual households. In this development region one of the famous temple of this district is located which is called "latainath" or "latinath".
