= Doti Palace =

Old Palace in Nepal

Doti Palace (Nepali: डोटी दरबार) is a historical palace located in Doti district of western Nepal. The palace was built during 15th century. Currently, the palace is in ruins.

== History ==
The palace was built during the reign of king Bhupati Shah to conduct state administrative works in the era of Baisya-Chaubisya states. The palace was then used by his son, king Deep Shahi, however he was defeated by the Gorkhali Army led by Amar Singh Thapa in 1847 BS.

During Rana reign, the palace was used for administrative work and resident of the officials. When Bahadhur Shumsher was the in charge of Doti district, he sold the palace to local citizen name Surat Bahadur at around 1990 BS in NPR 10,000. After the demise of Surat Bahadur, the palace was inherited by his son Basanta Amatya and later to his sons. Currently, the Palace is owned by Niranjan, Nirakar, Kamala and Nirbikar Amatya.

After it was sold, the palace was used by various governmental offices such as Land Reform Department, Doti Court and Doti Municipality. In 2038 BS, it was used by Seti Project and in 2041 BS, it was proposed to be technical school and later by Doti Campus. However, Amatya family were reluctant to sell the palace due to land dispute. A road was also proposed passing through the palace land, however court ordered to stop the construction.

== Architecture ==
The palace is built in a land area of about 46 Ropanis with two main buildings and a temple of Bhairava. The walls are constructed with stones measuring up to 11 feet long. The walls are cladded with brick masonry and the roof is tiled with slate. A tunnel from the palace is connected to Seti River which served for queen to reach Seti river for a bath. The tunnel has been buried now.

The palace had 40 rooms, servant quarters, entertainment hall and alter rooms.

== Conservation effort ==
Owing to lack of protection, the stones, wood and roofing materials have been stolen. However, now, the palace is being renovated by the Department of Archaeology (Nepal). Awareness programs are also conducted by organizing festivals around the palace.

== See also ==
- Garva Palace
