= List of monuments in Bajura, Nepal =

This is a list of monuments in Bajura District, Nepal as officially recognized by and available through the website of the Department of Archaeology, Nepal. Bajura is a district of Sudurpashchim Province and is located in western Nepal. Rana palaces and Hindu temples are the main attraction of this district.

== List of monuments ==
ID	Name	Type	Location	District	Coordinates	Image
NP-BJ-01	Badimalika			Bajura	29°25′21″N 81°22′47″E	Badimalika Upload Photo
NP-BJ-02	Dudimugra			Bajura		Upload Photo Upload Photo
NP-BJ-03	Naula (Traditional tap)			Bajura		Upload Photo Upload Photo
NP-BJ-04	Chandranath Temple			Bajura		Upload Photo Upload Photo
NP-BJ-05	Panekhit Masto			Bajura		Upload Photo Upload Photo
NP-BJ-06	Kailasmandu			Bajura		Upload Photo Upload Photo
NP-BJ-07	Mugra Devi			Bajura		Upload Photo Upload Photo
NP-BJ-08	Bhawani Madu			Bajura		Upload Photo Upload Photo
NP-BJ-09	Barjukot			Bajura		Upload Photo Upload Photo

== See also ==
- List of monuments in Sudurpashchim Province
- List of monuments in Nepal
