= Malikarjun =

Malikarjun मालिकार्जुन
- Gaunpalika
- Location in Nepal
- Coordinates: 29.75°N 80.49°E
- Country: Nepal
- Province: Sudurpashchim Province
- District: Darchula District

Population (1991)
  - Total: 1,814
- Time zone: UTC+5:45 (Nepal Time)
- Postal code: 10100

Malikarjun is a former village development committee that is now a Rural Municipality in Darchula District in Sudurpashchim Province of far western Nepal. Mallikarjun is named after the famous temple of lord Shiva Shree Shailyn shikar Malikarjun . At the time of the 1991 Nepal census it had a population of 1814 people living in 331 individual households.

== Media ==
To promote local culture Malikarjun has one FM radio station Radio Naya Nepal, 104.5 MHz, a community radio station.
