= List of monuments in Bajhang, Nepal =

This is a list of monuments in Bajhang District, Nepal as officially recognized by and available through the website of the Department of Archaeology, Nepal. Jalapa Devi Temple is one of the important cultural heritage of Bajhang district which is located in Rithapata V.D.C. of Dewal. Besides Jalapa Devi Temple, there is Masta Devi temple located in Jayaprithvinagar and Surmadevi temple in Chainpur which are also famous temples. Rana palaces and Hindu temples are the main attraction of this district.

== List of monuments ==
ID	Name	Type	Location	District	Coordinates	Image
NP-BH-01	Dewal Baj			Bajhang		Upload Photo Upload Photo
NP-BH-02	Bhopur Palace			Bajhang		Upload Photo Upload Photo
NP-BH-03	Dhantarmasto			Bajhang		Upload Photo Upload Photo
NP-BH-04	Jalapadevi Temple			Bajhang		Upload Photo Upload Photo
NP-BH-05	Banni Masto Mad			Bajhang		Upload Photo Upload Photo
NP-BH-06	Chainpur Palace			Bajhang		Upload Photo Upload Photo
NP-BH-07	Palace of the Bajhangi King			Bajhang		Upload Photo Upload Photo
NP-BH-08	Shaileshwori Temple			Bajhang		Upload Photo Upload Photo
NP-BH-09	Kot Bhairav & Kalika Temple			Bajhang		Upload Photo Upload Photo
NP-BH-10	Masto Madu			Bajhang		Upload Photo Upload Photo
NP-BH-11	lhasain Madu			Bajhang		Upload Photo Upload Photo
NP-BH-12	Dumrakot			Bajhang		Upload Photo Upload Photo
NP-BH-13	Thalarakot			Bajhang		Upload Photo Upload Photo
NP-BH-14	Talkot			Bajhang		Upload Photo Upload Photo

== See also ==
- List of monuments in Sudurpashchim Province
- List of monuments in Nepal
