= List of monuments in Achham, Nepal =

This is a list of monuments in Achham District, Nepal as officially recognized by and available through the website of the Department of Archaeology, Nepal. Achham is a district of Sudurpashchim Province and is located in western Nepal. Dewals and Hindu temples are the main attraction of this district.

== List of monuments ==
ID	Name	Type	Location	District	Coordinates	Image
NP-ACH-01	Kalagaon Dewal			Achham		Upload Photo Upload Photo
NP-ACH-02	Panchadewal of Vinayak			Achham		Upload Photo Upload Photo
NP-ACH-03	Dewal of Talkot			Achham		Upload Photo Upload Photo
NP-ACH-04	Two dewal of Vinayak			Achham		Upload Photo Upload Photo
NP-ACH-05	Kuchivihar			Achham		Upload Photo Upload Photo
NP-ACH-06	Darnakot Palace			Achham		Upload Photo Upload Photo
NP-ACH-07	Bhageshwor's ek dewal			Achham		Upload Photo Upload Photo
NP-ACH-08	Banssain dewal			Achham		Upload Photo Upload Photo
NP-ACH-09	One dewal of Dewalgada			Achham		Upload Photo Upload Photo
NP-ACH-10	Kalagaon Stone tap			Achham		Upload Photo Upload Photo
NP-ACH-11	Naigoun Stone Tap			Achham		Upload Photo Upload Photo
NP-ACH-12	Mangaleshwori Temple			Achham		Upload Photo Upload Photo
NP-ACH-13	Stone Tap at sera			Achham		Upload Photo Upload Photo
NP-ACH-14	One Dewal			Achham		Upload Photo Upload Photo
NP-ACH-15	Two Dewal of Dhamali			Achham		Upload Photo Upload Photo
NP-ACH-16	Five Dewal near Darnakot			Achham		Upload Photo Upload Photo
NP-ACH-17	Masto Temple at Vinayak			Achham		Upload Photo Upload Photo
NP-ACH-18	Okhal at stone			Achham		Upload Photo Upload Photo
NP-ACH-19	Kalika Temple			Achham		Upload Photo Upload Photo
NP-ACH-20	Stone Tap of Dhaku			Achham		Upload Photo Upload Photo
NP-ACH-21	Mandali Masto temple			Achham		Upload Photo Upload Photo
NP-ACH-22	Mane wall			Achham		Upload Photo Upload Photo
NP-ACH-23	Dhamali Stone Inscription			Achham		Upload Photo Upload Photo
NP-ACH-24	Baijanath Dham			Achham		Upload Photo Upload Photo
NP-ACH-25	Jalpadevi Temple			Achham		Upload Photo Upload Photo
NP-ACH-26	Tripurasundari			Achham		Upload Photo Upload Photo
NP-ACH-27	Rithinawa			Achham		Upload Photo Upload Photo
NP-ACH-28	Hadasaina Mada			Achham		Upload Photo Upload Photo

== See also ==
- List of monuments in Sudurpashchim Province
- List of monuments in Nepal
