= Garva Palace =

Old Palace in Nepal

Garbha Durbar
- गर्भा दरबार
- Garbha Durbar

General information
- Status: Dilapidated
- Location: Chure Rural Municipality, Kailali District, Nepal
- Completed: 1984 B.S.

Technical details
- Material: Bricks from Chaumala, sal wood from the Terai–Bhabar region, and tin
- Floor count: 3

Garva Palace (Nepali: गर्भा दरबार) is a historical site located in Chure Rural Municipality in Kailali district of western Nepal. Currently, the palace is in derelict condition due to lack of necessary conservation. The palace is spread over 10 Ropanis of land.

== History ==
The palace was built by Khadga Shamsher Jang Bahadur Rana between 1979 and 1984 BS. Special craftsmen were brought from India to build the palace. The palace used to serve the purpose of collecting taxes and settling cases in Kailali, Kanchanpur and Doti districts. Later, the Palace was used by Bahadur Shumsher, son of Khadak Shumsher.

After the Rana reign was over, a post office and a village development committee office was set up in the palace. During the civil war, Maoist set fire in the palace. Since then the building has been uninhabited.

Currently, most of the doors and windows of the palace have been damaged.

== Architecture ==
The palace is three-storey tall. It has 83 carved wooden windows and 53 doors. The walls are painted with artistic figures. There is a tunnel in the palace for security purposes.

== Conservation effort ==
Sudurpashchim Province government has allocated budget for renovation of the palace. However, no work has been done so far.

The locals have rallied across the country to highlight the need of renovation.

== See also ==
- Rana palaces of Nepal
- Doti Palace
