= Ajaymeru Rural Municipality =

Ajaymeru Rural Municipality(Nahal Bist Niwas) अजयमेरु गाउँपालिका
- Rural Municipality
- अजयमेरु गाउँपालिका Ajaymeru Rural Municipality(Nahal Bist Niwas) (Nepal)
- Coordinates: 29.361°N 80.519°E
- Country: Nepal
- Province: Sudurpashchim Province
- District: Dadeldhura District

Government
  - Type: Local government
  - Chairperson: Umesh Prasad Bhatta (BIKAS)
  - Administravite Head: Ganga Ram Sapkota

Area
  - Total: 148.9 km^{2} (57.5 sq mi)

Population (2021 census)
  - Total: 15,161
  - Density: 101.8/km^{2} (263.7/sq mi)
- Time zone: UTC+05:45 (Nepal Standard Time)
- Website: http://ajayamerumun.gov.np

Ajaymeru (Nepali: अजयमेरु)) is a Gaupalika in Dadeldhura District in the Sudurpashchim Province of far-western Nepal. Ajaymeru has a population of 15,161.The land area is 148.9 km^{2}. It was formed by merging Samaiji, Ajaymeru, Bhadrapur, Chipur and Dewal Divayapuri VDCs.

== See also ==
- Ajaymerukot Palace
