= 1991 Nepal census =

9th national census of Nepal

1991 Nepal Census
- 1991

General information
- Country: Nepal
- Authority: Central Bureau of Statistics
- Website: www.cbs.gov.np

Results
- Total population: 18,491,097 (▲23.09%)
- Most populous Development Region: Central (6,183,955)
- Least populous Development Region: Far-Western (1,679,301)

The 1991 Nepal census was the 9th national census of Nepal. The census was conducted by Central Bureau of Statistics. It was the first census to formally collect data about caste and ethnicity. According to the census the total population of Nepal was 18,491,097.

Working with Nepal's Village Development Committees at a district level, they recorded data from all the main towns and villages of each district of the country. The data included statistics on population size, households, sex and age distribution, place of birth, residence characteristics, literacy, marital status, religion, language spoken, caste/ethnic group, economically active population, education, number of children, employment status, and occupation.

This census was followed by the 2001 Nepal census.

== Key findings ==
The key findings of 1991 census are as follows:

Total population	18,491,097
Intercensal change	3,468,258
Intercensal change percentage	23.09%
Annual growth rate	2.08%
Population density (per km^{2})	125.6
Male population	9,220,974
Female population	9,270,123
Gender ratio	99.5
Literacy rate	39.6%

== Population distribution ==
Population by ecological region (1991)
Ecological region	Population	Percentage (%)	Sex ratio	Annual growth rate (%)	Population density (per km^{2})
Mountain	1,443,130	7.8	98.43	1.02	27.85
Hill	8,419,889	45.5	95.34	1.61	137.25
Terai	8,628,078	46.7	103.85	2.75	253.58
Nepal	18,491,097	100	99.47	2.08	125.63

Population by development region (1991)
Development region	Population	Percentage (%)	Sex ratio	Annual growth rate (%)	Population density (per km^{2})
Eastern	4,446,749	24.05	100	1.81	156.25
Central	6,183,955	33.44	104	2.31	225.61
Western	3,770,678	20.39	93	1.87	128.26
Mid-Western	2,410,414	13.04	99	2.09	56.87
Far-Western	1,679,301	9.08	96	2.41	85.95
Nepal	18,491,097	100	99	2.08	125.63

== Population by district ==
Population by district (1991)
S.N	Eco-Development Region (Note: Development regions further sub-divided according to ecological belts.)	District	Population	Sex ratio	Annual growth rate (%)	Density (per km^{2})
1	Eastern Mountain	Taplejung	120,053	95	−0.06	32.9
2	Eastern Mountain	Sankhuwasabha	141,903	96	0.92	40.8
3	Eastern Mountain	Solukhumbu	97,200	97	0.97	29.4
4	Eastern Hill	Panchthar	175,206	97	1.31	141.2
5	Eastern Hill	Ilam	229,214	101	2.51	134.6
6	Eastern Hill	Dhankuta	146,386	97	1.20	164.3
7	Eastern Hill	Tehrathum	102,870	95	1.07	151.5
8	Eastern Hill	Bhojpur	198,784	93	0.31	131.9
9	Eastern Hill	Okhaldhunga	139,457	95	0.13	129.9
10	Eastern Hill	Khotang	215,965	94	0.16	135.7
11	Eastern Hill	Udayapur	221,256	98	3.25	107.3
12	Eastern Terai	Jhapa	593,737	102	2.13	369.7
13	Eastern Terai	Morang	674,823	103	2.33	363.8
14	Eastern Terai	Sunsari	463,481	102	2.96	368.7
15	Eastern Terai	Saptari	465,668	103	2.06	341.6
16	Eastern Terai	Siraha	460,746	105	2.05	387.8
17	Central Mountain	Dolakha	173,236	96	1.40 (1.54) (Note: Values in parentheses are annual growth rates adjusted for 1982 district boundary changes.)	79.1
18	Central Mountain	Rasuwa	36,744	107	1.95	23.8
19	Central Mountain	Sindhupalchok	261,025	101	1.16 (1.05)	102.7
20	Central Hill	Ramechhap	188,064	93	1.53 (1.40)	121.7
21	Central Hill	Kavrepalanchok	324,329	97	0.54 (0.79)	232.3
22	Central Hill	Nuwakot	245,260	99	1.89 (1.53)	218.8
23	Central Hill	Dhading	278,068	98	1.33 (1.61)	144.4
24	Central Hill	Kathmandu	675,341	108	4.70 (4.60)	1,709.7
25	Central Hill	Lalitpur	257,086	103	3.32 (2.53)	667.8
26	Central Hill	Bhaktapur	172,952	100	0.79 (1.80)	1,453.4
27	Central Hill	Makwanpur	314,599	103	2.56	129.7
28	Central Hill	Sindhuli	223,900	99	1.98	89.9
29	Central Terai	Dhanusha	543,672	107	2.28 (2.36)	460.7
30	Central Terai	Mahottari	440,146	107	1.98 (1.89)	439.3
31	Central Terai	Sarlahi	492,798	107	2.12	391.4
32	Central Terai	Rautahat	414,005	107	2.19	367.7
33	Central Terai	Bara	415,718	107	2.64	349.3
34	Central Terai	Parsa	372,524	108	2.70	275.3
35	Central Terai	Chitwan	354,488	98	3.11	159.8
36	Western Mountain	Manang	5,363	108	−2.69	2.4
37	Western Mountain	Mustang	14,292	109	1.00	4.0
38	Western Hill	Gorkha	252,524	92	0.80	70.0
39	Western Hill	Lamjung	153,697	90	0.06	90.8
40	Western Hill	Tanahun	268,073	90	1.82	173.4
41	Western Hill	Syangja	293,526	86	0.77	252.2
42	Western Hill	Kaski	292,945	93	2.81	145.2
43	Western Hill	Baglung	232,486	87	0.77	130.3
44	Western Hill	Myagdi	100,552	90	0.37	43.8
45	Western Hill	Parbat	143,547	86	1.12	290.6
46	Western Hill	Gulmi	266,331	83	1.12	231.8
47	Western Hill	Arghakhanchi	180,884	87	1.40	151.6
48	Western Hill	Palpa	236,313	87	0.97	172.1
49	Western Terai	Nawalparasi	436,217	99	3.45	201.8
50	Western Terai	Rupandehi	522,150	103	3.20	383.9
51	Western Terai	Kapilvastu	371,778	106	3.20	213.9
52	Mid-Western Mountain	Jumla	75,964	103	0.99	30.0
53	Mid-Western Mountain	Humla	34,383	106	5.27 (1.80)	6.1
54	Mid-Western Mountain	Mugu	36,364	104	−1.84 (0.30)	10.3
55	Mid-Western Mountain	Kalikot	88,805	101	0.13 (1.08)	51.0
56	Mid-Western Mountain	Dolpa	25,013	103	1.26	3.2
57	Mid-Western Hill	Pyuthan	175,469	87	1.07	134.1
58	Mid-Western Hill	Rolpa	179,621	92	0.66	95.6
59	Mid-Western Hill	Rukum	155,554	98	1.61	54.1
60	Mid-Western Hill	Jajarkot	113,958	101	1.38	51.1
61	Mid-Western Hill	Dailekh	187,400	99	1.18 (1.24)	124.8
62	Mid-Western Hill	Salyan	181,785	98	1.78 (1.23)	124.3
63	Mid-Western Hill	Surkhet	225,768	98	3.06 (3.01)	92.1
64	Mid-Western Terai	Dang	354,413	98	2.85	119.9
65	Mid-Western Terai	Banke	285,604	102	3.77 (3.80)	122.2
66	Mid-Western Terai	Bardiya	290,313	107	3.30 (3.71)	143.4
67	Far-Western Mountain	Bajura	92,010	96	2.00 (1.18)	42.1
68	Far-Western Mountain	Bajhang	139,092	92	1.15	40.7
69	Far-Western Mountain	Darchula	101,683	97	1.20	43.8
70	Far-Western Hill	Achham	198,188	89	0.68 (0.64)	118.0
71	Far-Western Hill	Doti	167,168	93	0.88 (0.89)	82.6
72	Far-Western Hill	Dadeldhura	104,647	93	1.86	68.0
73	Far-Western Hill	Baitadi	200,716	92	1.14	132.1
74	Far-Western Terai	Kailali	417,891	101	4.83 (4.82)	129.2
75	Far-Western Terai	Kanchanpur	257,906	102	4.23	160.2
Nepal			18,491,097	99	2.08	125.6

== Population by caste/ethnicity ==
Population by caste/ethnicity (1991)
S.N.	Caste/ethnicity	Population	Percentage (%)
1	Chhetri/Kshetri	2,968,082	16.05
2	Brahmin-Hill (Bahun)	2,388,455	12.92
3	Magar	1,339,308	7.24
4	Tharu	1,194,224	6.46
5	Newar	1,041,090	5.63
6	Tamang	1,018,252	5.51
7	Kami	963,655	5.21
8	Yadav	765,137	4.14
9	Muslim	653,055	3.53
10	Rai	525,551	2.84
11	Gurung	449,189	2.43
12	Damai/Dholi	367,989	1.99
13	Thakuri	299,473	1.62
14	Limbu	297,186	1.61
15	Sarki	276,224	1.49
16	Teli	250,732	1.36
17	Kushwaha	205,797	1.11
18	Chamar/Harijan/Ram	203,919	1.10
19	Sanyasi	181,726	0.98
20	Kurmi	166,718	0.90
21	Brahmin-Terai	162,886	0.88
22	Sudhi/Kalwar	162,046	0.88
23	Musahar	141,980	0.77
24	Dhanuk	136,944	0.74
25	Mallaha	110,413	0.60
26	Sherpa	110,358	0.60
27	Baniya	101,868	0.55
28	Kewat	101,482	0.55
29	Dushad/Paswan/Pasi	93,242	0.50
30	Rajbanshi	82,177	0.44
21	Kumal	76,635	0.41
32	Dhobi	76,594	0.41
33	Kumhar	72,008	0.39
34	Kanu	70,634	0.38
35	Khatwe	66,612	0.36
36	Rajput	55,712	0.30
37	Majhi	55,050	0.30
38	Kayastha	53,545	0.29
39	Danuwar	50,754	0.27
40	Halwai	44,417	0.24
41	Sunuwar	40,943	0.22
42	Chepang (Praja)	36,656	0.20
43	Rajbhar	33,433	0.18
44	Marwadi	29,173	0.16
45	Gangai	22,526	0.12
46	Thami	19,103	0.10
47	Dhimal	16,781	0.09
48	Thakali	13,731	0.07
49	Bhote	12,463	0.07
50	Darai	10,759	0.06
51	Punjabi/Sikh	9,292	0.05
52	Bengali	7,909	0.04
53	Badi	7,082	0.04
54	Bote	6,718	0.04
55	Jirel	4,889	0.03
56	Lepcha	4,826	0.03
57	Gaine	4,484	0.02
58	Raji	3,274	0.02
59	Raute	2,878	0.02
60	Churaute	1,778	0.01
Others-Terai		627,514	3.39
Others-Hill		184,216	1.00
Others-Mountain		1,741	0.01
No caste (Foreigners)		2,951	0.02
Not stated		4,858	0.03
Total		18,491,097	100

== Population by language ==
Languages by number of native speakers (1991)
S.N.	Language	Number of speakers	Percentage (%)
1	Nepali	9,302,880	50.31
2	Maithili	2,191,900	11.85
3	Bhojpuri	1,379,717	7.46
4	Tharu	993,388	5.37
5	Tamang	904,456	4.89
6	Newar	690,007	3.73
7	Rai, Kirat	439,312	2.38
8	Magar	430,264	2.30
9	Awadhi	374,635	2.03
10	Gurung	227,918	1.23
11	Limbu	254,088	1.37
12	Urdu	202,208	1.09
13	Hindi	170,997	0.92
14	Bhote, Sherpa	121,819	0.66
15	Rajbansi	85,558	0.46
16	Bengali/Bangla	27,712	0.15
17	Satar	25,302	0.14
18	Chepang	25,097	0.14
19	Danuwar	23,721	0.13
20	Rajasthani	16,514	0.09
21	Jhangar/Dhanga	15,175	0.08
22	Dhimal	15,014	0.08
23	Thami	14,400	0.08
24	Majhi	11,322	0.06
25	Santhali	8,030	0.04
26	Thakali	7,113	0.04
27	Darai	6,520	0.04
28	Jirel	4,229	0.02
29	Raji	2,959	0.02
30	English	2,784	0.02
31	Kumal	1,413	0.01
32	Byansi	1,314	0.01
Other local language		495,862	2.68
Other foreign language		8,309	0.04
Not stated		9,157	0.05
Total		18,491,097	100

== See also ==
- Census in Nepal
- 1981 Nepal census
- 2001 Nepal census
