= List of monuments in Baitadi, Nepal =

This is a list of monuments in Baitadi District, Nepal as officially recognized by and available through the website of the Department of Archaeology, Nepal. Baitadi is a district of Sudurpashchim Province and is located in western Nepal. Hindu temples are the main attraction of this district.

== List of monuments ==
ID	Name	Type	Location	District	Coordinates	Image
NP-BA-01	Dewalhatka Naula Bhapi			Baitadi		Upload Photo Upload Photo
NP-BA-02	Dewalhatka Dewalharu			Baitadi		Upload Photo Upload Photo
NP-BA-03	Rimgaunka Dewalharu			Baitadi		Upload Photo Upload Photo
NP-BA-04	Magargaun Chamsali Bohara ko Dungedhara			Baitadi		Upload Photo Upload Photo
NP-BA-05	Kullekot			Baitadi		Upload Photo Upload Photo
NP-BA-06	Talladehi Dilasheeni Bhagawati Temple			Baitadi		Upload Photo Upload Photo
NP-BA-07	Dehimadou (Ninglasaini) Bhagabati Temple			Baitadi		Upload Photo Upload Photo
NP-BA-08	Jagannath Mandir			Baitadi		Jagannath Mandir Upload Photo
NP-BA-09	Tripurasundari (Rajseeni) Temple			Baitadi		Tripurasundari (Rajseeni) Temple Upload Photo
NP-BA-10	Melauli Bhagawati Temple			Baitadi		Upload Photo Upload Photo
NP-BA-11	Gaura Temple Danshili			Baitadi		Upload Photo Upload Photo

== See also ==
- List of monuments in Sudurpashchim Province
- List of monuments in Nepal
