= Nepal Federation of Indigenous Nationalities =

- President: Nima Lama Hyolmo
- General Secretary: Mr Bimal Saru
- Website: https://nefin.org.np/

Nepal Federation of Indigenous Nationalities (NEFIN) is a national level umbrella organisation of indigenous peoples/nationalities in Nepal founded in 1991 as the Nepal Federation of Nationalities (NEFEN).

In 2003, the organization was renamed as the Nepal Federation of Indigenous Nationalities.

In 2019 the organisation consists of 56 indigenous member organizations.

Current President of the NEFIN is Nima Lama Hyolmo.

== See also ==
- Nepal Indigenous Nationalities Students' Federation
