= List of monuments in Kanchanpur, Nepal =

This is a list of monuments in Kanchanpur District, Nepal as officially recognized by and available through the website of the Department of Archaeology, Nepal. Kanchanpur is a district of Sudurpashchim Province and is located in western Nepal. Hindu temples are the main attraction of this district.

== List of monuments ==
ID	Name	Type	Location	District	Coordinates	Image
NP-KP-01	Itahababa's archaeological site			Kanchanpur		Upload Photo Upload Photo
NP-KP-02	Sinhapur's archaeological site			Kanchanpur		Upload Photo Upload Photo
NP-KP-03	Baijanath Temple of Rautela			Kanchanpur		Upload Photo Upload Photo
NP-KP-04	Itahababa's archaeological site			Kanchanpur		Upload Photo Upload Photo
NP-KP-05	Sihapur's archaeological site			Kanchanpur		Upload Photo Upload Photo

== See also ==
- List of monuments in Sudurpashchim Province
- List of monuments in Nepal
