= List of monuments in Doti, Nepal =

This is a list of monuments in Doti District, Nepal as officially recognized by and available through the website of the Department of Archaeology, Nepal. Doti is a district of Sudurpashchim Province and is located in western Nepal. Rana palaces and Hindu temples are the main attraction of this district.

== List of monuments ==
ID	Name	Type	Location	District	Coordinates	Image
NP-DO-01	Badimalika			Doti		Upload Photo Upload Photo
NP-DO-02	Malika Fort & Temple			Doti		Upload Photo Upload Photo
NP-DO-03	Wall of Ujeli Village			Doti		Upload Photo Upload Photo
NP-DO-04	Naula (Traditional tap)			Doti		Upload Photo Upload Photo
NP-DO-05	Saileshwori Temple			Doti		Saileshwori Temple Upload Photo
NP-DO-06	Rani Pauwa			Doti		Upload Photo Upload Photo
NP-DO-07	Dipayalkot & Kot Bhairav			Doti		Upload Photo Upload Photo
NP-DO-08	Malika Temple			Doti		Upload Photo Upload Photo
NP-DO-09	Shiv Temple			Doti		Upload Photo Upload Photo
NP-DO-10	Ranighara			Doti		Upload Photo Upload Photo
NP-DO-11	Saraswati Temple			Doti		Upload Photo Upload Photo
NP-DO-12	Dilipeshwor Mahadev Temple			Doti		Upload Photo Upload Photo
NP-DO-13	Dmkhola Ghara			Doti		Upload Photo Upload Photo
NP-DO-14	Mandau Chautaro			Doti		Upload Photo Upload Photo
NP-DO-15	nanko pinaro			Doti		Upload Photo Upload Photo
NP-DO-16	Mangraun Ghara			Doti		Upload Photo Upload Photo
NP-DO-17	Nirauliko thulaghar ra nau			Doti		Upload Photo Upload Photo
NP-DO-18	Dhurkot			Doti		Upload Photo Upload Photo

== See also ==
- List of monuments in Sudurpashchim Province
- List of monuments in Nepal
