= Ajaymerukot =

- अजयमेरुकोट (Nepali)
- Ajayamerukot, Ajaymeru Fort
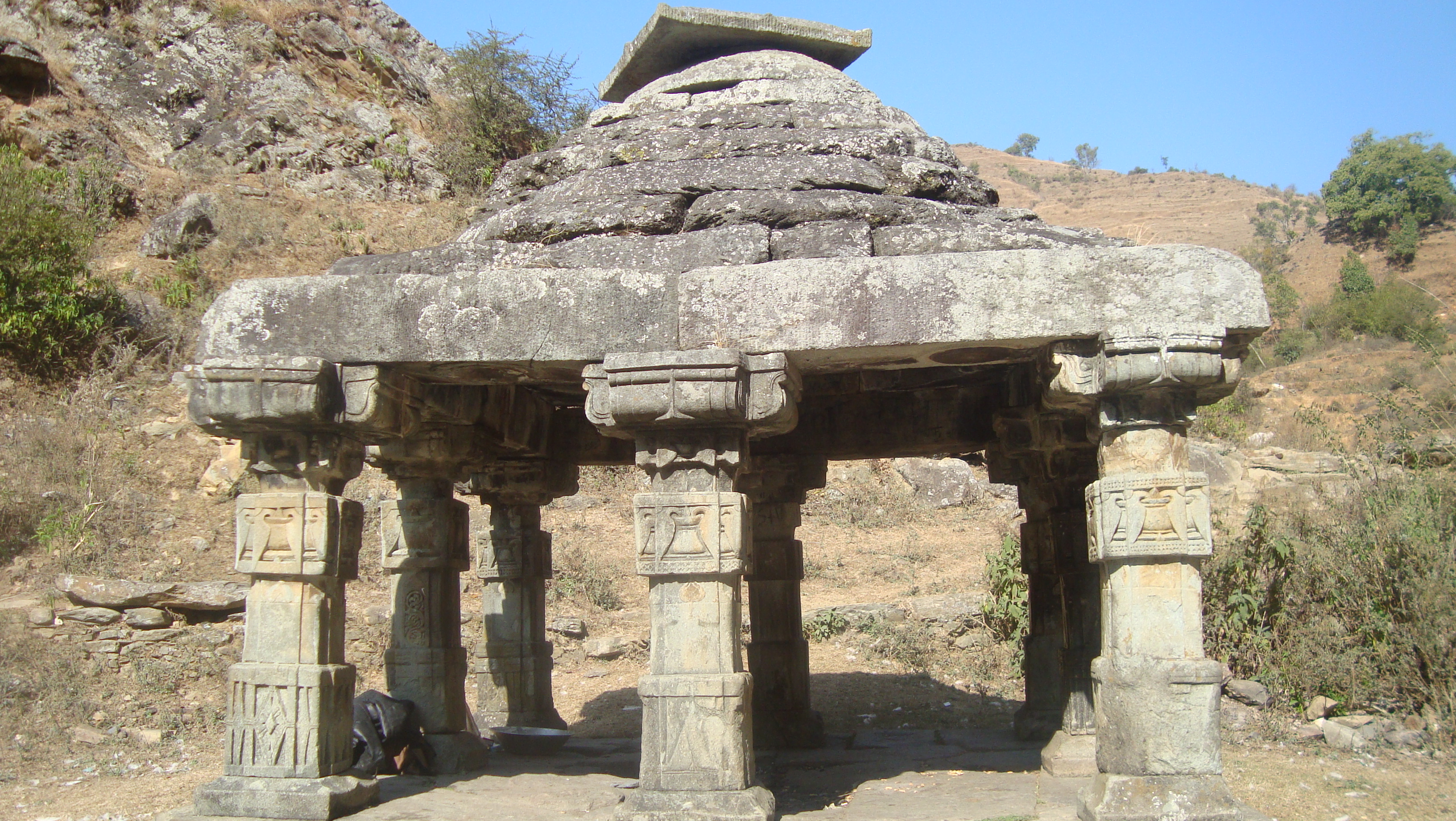
- Assembly place at Ajaymerukot

- Location in Nepal
- 29.304°N 80.591°E
- Type: Palace and fort complex
- Periods: Medieval Nepal
- Associated with: Doti kingdom
- Location: Ajaymeru Rural Municipality, Dadeldhura District, Sudurpashchim Province, Nepal

History
- Built: 13th century
- Built by: Katyuri dynasty / Malla kings
- Abandoned: 1790 (after Gorkha conquest)

Site notes
- Material: Stone, lime mortar
- Excavation dates: 2025
- Archaeologists: Bhaskar Gyawali (Department of Archaeology)
- Condition: Partially reconstructed
- Owner: Government of Nepal
- Management: Department of Archaeology
- Public access: Yes

Ajaymerukot (Nepali: अजयमेरुकोट) was one of the capitals of the Doti kingdom established by the Malla kings in the 13th century. The ruins of the palace are located in Ajaymeru Rural Municipality in Dadeldhura district, about 3.3 kilometres (2.1 mi) from Dadeldhura, Nepal.

== Etymology ==
The name Ajaymerukot is believed to derive from Sanskrit ajaya ("invincible") and meru ("mountain"), reflecting its strategic hilltop location. Local tradition sometimes associates the name with a King Ajay Pal, but no historical records have confirmed the existence of such a ruler in the Katyuri or Doteli dynasties.

== History ==
Ajaymerukot was one of the capitals of the Doti kingdom, which emerged after the fall of the Katyuri dynasty in the 13th century. The Katyuri kingdom, which ruled parts of present day Uttarakhand and western Nepal from the 7th to the 12th century, later got fragmented into several successor states, one of which was Doti.

The establishment of Ajaymerukot is not verified, but two theories exist. The first theory says that it was established in the 13th century by King Ranjana Paal, while another theory says it was established by princes Sahastra Paal and Niryapaldev of the Katyuri dynasty before 1411 BS (1354–1355 CE). During the reign of King Niranjan Pal in the Doti Kingdom, Ajaymerukot was developed into a strong political center. Inscriptions found there suggest it served as a major administrative center from the 16th century onward, under rulers such as Niranjan Pal, Nagi Malla, Ripu Malla, Niray Pal, and Nag Malla.

During the reign of Emperor Akbar in the 16th century, Ajaymerukot faced a devastating attack by Muslim forces, leading to its destruction. Following this, the capital was relocated to Silgadhi, Doti. The region remained in ruins until Nepal's unification in 1790 under Bahadur Shah, when it was annexed into the expanding Gorkha Empire.

== Architecture ==
The palace complex features a unique architectural style influenced by the Katyuri dynasty. Excavations in 2025 revealed that the main palace was a two storey structure with approximately 14 rooms, a central corridor, and a stone staircase. The walls were rebuilt to a height of 3 meters , and constructed using large stones hardened by mixing lime with stone dust. The site also includes a mandap (ceremonial hall), defensive towers, the Queen's cave, wells, and a horse stable known locally as Gholidans.

The stone carvings placed on the palace are believed to have been carved by Jaad artists from India. An assembly hall is situated in the lower section of the palace, and a paved staircase leads from the palace to a bathhouse.

== Inscriptions and archaeological findings ==
A copper inscription by King Niray Paldev, dated 1419 BS (1362–1363 CE), has been found in the ruins. Excavations in 2025 discovered inscriptions in eight locations, including records of King Niraya Pal from Saka Sambat 1250 (1420 BS) and King Nag Malla from Saka Sambat 1306 (1441 BS). However, a historical debate that exists regarding King Nagi Malla; while some accounts suggest he ruled in 1238, no inscriptions has been found confirming his presence, raising questions about the timeline of rulers in Ajaymerukot.

The inscriptions confirm that the region was an important center of the Katyuri dynasty. According to Bhaskar Gyawali, Chief Archaeological Officer at the Department of Archaeology, the distinct art and architecture of Ajaymerukot differ from the temples east of the Karnali River, representing one of the finest artistic examples in Nepal.

== Conservation and reconstruction ==
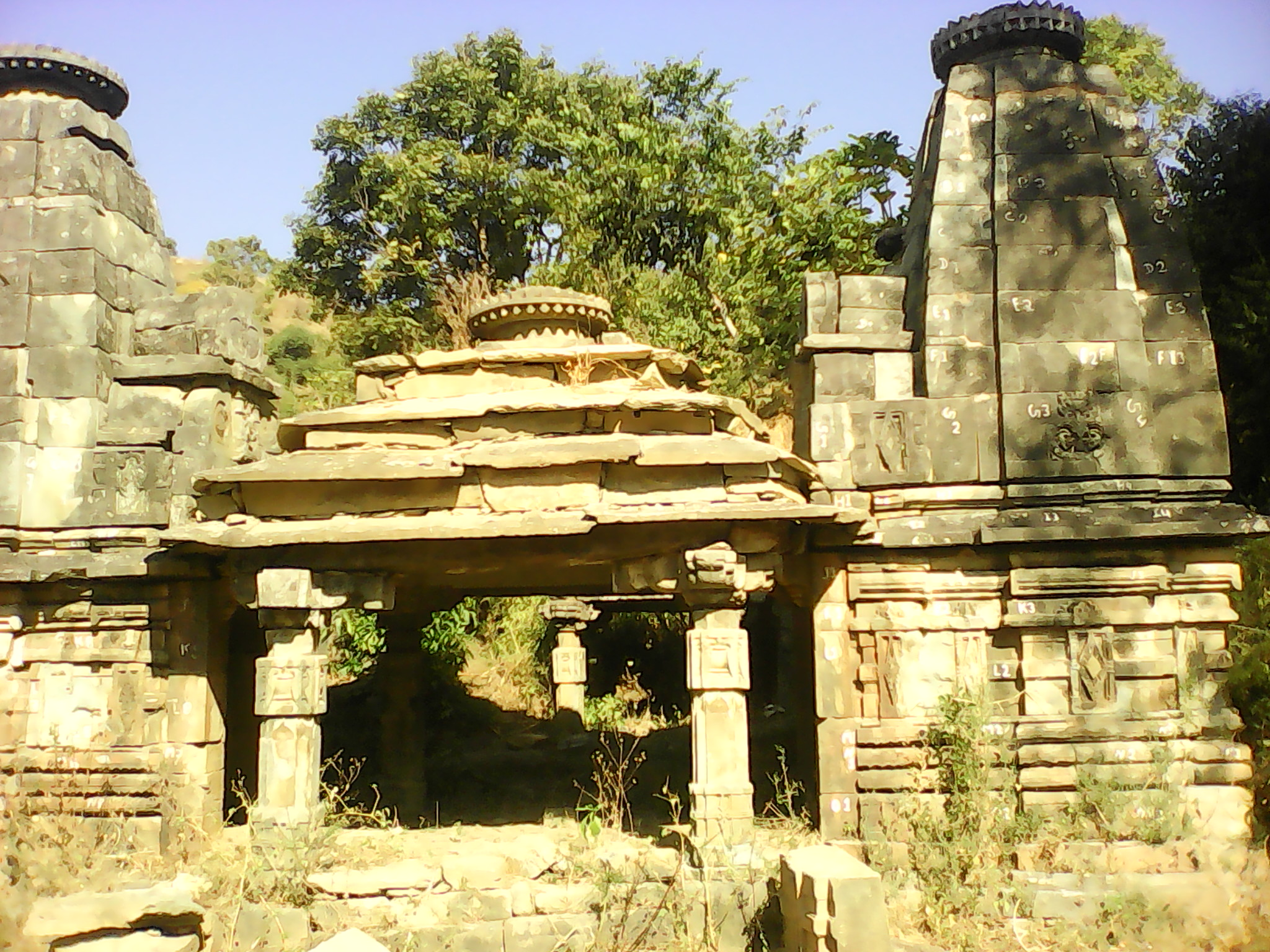
Ruins of the palace before reconstruction

For a long period, the ruins were ignored , and protest by locals affected conservation efforts. In 2017 (2074 BS), the government initiated a conservation plan. In 2025, the Department of Archaeology conducted the first detailed excavation of the main palace area, funded by a रू

9 million (NPR) allocation from Ajaymeru Rural Municipality. Reconstruction began in June 2025 with a budget of रू 7.8 million (NPR), following the architectural style found during the excavation. Artisans from Bhaktapur were brought in to match traditional craftsmanship.

The ground floor of the palace has been completed, though it remains unclear whether the original structure had two storeys or more, as thin stone slabs found in the area suggest a stone roof, but no wood was discovered. The reconstruction has been prioritized for preserving Doteli heritage and is expected to boost tourism in the region.

== Tourism ==
Ajaymerukot is an emerging tourist destination in far-western Nepal, offering a glimpse of the region's medieval history and architecture. The site is reachable with a short drive from Dadeldhura, and a 15–20 minute uphill climb. Nearby attractions include Risedi Kot, Ukukot, and the Amar Gadi Fort.

== See also ==
- Ajaymeru Rural Municipality
- Doti Kingdom
- Katyuri dynasty
- Dadeldhura District
