= National Statistics Office (Nepal) =

Central agency for statistics in Nepal

- राष्ट्रिय तथ्याङ्क कार्यालय

Agency overview
- Formed: 1959 (as Central Bureau of Statistics)
- Preceding agency: Department of Statistics
- Jurisdiction: Nepal
- Headquarters: Thapathali, Kathmandu, Nepal
- Agency executive: Dr. Kamal Prasad Pokhrel, Chief Statistician (2024–Present)
- Key document: Statistics Act, 2079 B.S (2022 A.D)
- Website: nsonepal.gov.np

The National Statistics Office (Nepali: राष्ट्रिय तथ्याङ्क कार्यालय) formerly known as Central Bureau of Statistics (Nepali: केन्द्रीय तथ्याङ्क विभाग), is the central agency for the collection, consolidation, processing, analysis, publication and dissemination of statistics in Nepal. The Office is under the Office of the Prime Minister and Council of Ministers. One of its core tasks is to research and publish censuses of Nepal, the most prominent one being the overall population census and Demographics of Nepal.

== History ==
The Central Bureau of Statistics was established on 1 January 1959 as per the Statistics Act, 2015 B.S (1958 A.D). It replaced the former Department of Statistics (Nepali: संख्या विभाग) established in 1950. The Bureau was initially under the Ministry of Finance and later moved under the National Planning Commission of Nepal, which is headed by the Prime Minister of Nepal.

After the April 2015 Nepal earthquake, the Bureau, in coordination with the United Nations, collected data regarding the damages in order for the Government of Nepal to support and compensate the victims.

Before 2015, different Nepalese governmental organisations gathered statistical information on their own. This led to inconsistencies in statistical information, for which the Bureau called for improvement of the processes, which, however, were not implemented as of 2017.

On 13 October 2022, the existing Central Bureau of Statistics was upgraded to National Statistics Office as per the new Statistics Act of 2079 B.S (2022 A.D) and brought under the Office of the Prime Minister and Council of Ministers.

The Office's main functions include providing its government with statistics to help with public policy planning, collecting and analyzing socioeconomic data, and developing methodologies for reliable data collection and implementation.
