= Census in Nepal =

National Census of Nepal राष्ट्रिय जनगणना
- Frequency: Decennial
- Country: Nepal
- Years active: 115
- Inaugurated: 1911
- Previous event: 2021; 5 years ago
- Next event: 2031; 5 years' time
- Organiser: Central Bureau of Statistics
- Website: www.cbs.gov.np

The National Census of Nepal is conducted every ten years to collect information about the demographic, social, economic and other parameters. The first census in Nepal was conducted in 1911. The first four censuses were conducted during Rana period using a traditional approach and merely considered as headcounts. The censuses since 1952-54 have been conducted using modern scientific methods. At present, the census is carried out by the Central Bureau of Statistics under the National Planning Commission. The census is a mandatory process to be carried out every 10 years as per the Article 281 of Constitution of Nepal.

== Rana period ==
=== 1911 ===
The 1911 census was the first official national census in the history of Nepal. It was conducted during the period of Rana Prime Minister Chandra Shumsher. The government issued an official order to the people through Istihar (government notification) to cooperate with the enumerators who were to visit door to door for census enumeration. Patwaris (land revenue collectors) were engaged in data collection all over the country. The census had established a milestone in the tradition of census taking in Nepal. The census recorded total population of 5,638,749.

=== 1920 ===
The 1920 census was the second census conducted in Nepal. It was aimed primarily to prepare an inventory of slaves (Servant, Bandha and Kariya, Kamara-Kamari). Another purpose was to count the number of taxable people as well as young people available to be recruited in the security forces.

=== 1930 ===
The third census was conducted in 1930 under Prime Minister Bhim Shumsher, during a time of war rhetoric and preparation between Nepal and Tibet. The population count was therefore thought to be grossly undercounted because of the fear of compulsory recruitment in the army.

=== 1941−42 ===
The census of 1941−42 was the fourth census of Nepal. It was the first census conducted by a permanent statistical office named Janasankhya Goswara (Department of Population), during the period of Prime Minister Juddha Shumsher. The department had attempted to improve census coverage by improving the schedule, by recruiting more enumerators and also by reducing the census areas.

== Modern censuses ==
=== 1952–54 ===
This was the fifth census and first modern census conducted in Nepal. It was conducted after the advent of democracy in 1951. The census was conducted in two phases: the Eastern part of the country except Mahottari District was enumerated in 1952 whereas the Western part and Mahottari District were enumerated in 1954.

=== 1961 ===
This was the sixth census conducted in Nepal. It was the first census conducted by Central Bureau of Statistics, established in 1958.

=== 1971 ===
This was the seventh census conducted in Nepal. It was the first census conducted after the division of Nepal into 14 zones and 75 districts in 1962. It was also the first census to use computer for data processing.

=== 1981 ===
This was the eighth census conducted in Nepal.

=== 1991 ===
This was the ninth census conducted in Nepal. This was the first census to formally collect and publish data on caste and ethnicity.

=== 2001 ===
This was the tenth census conducted in Nepal. Census enumeration was affected in different parts of the country due to then-ongoing Maoist insurgency.

=== 2011 ===
This was the eleventh census conducted in Nepal. It marked the 100 years of census taking in Nepal.

=== 2021 ===
This is the twelfth census conducted in Nepal. It is the first census conducted under the new federal structure of 7 provinces, 77 districts and 753 local bodies.

== Results ==
The population of Nepal as per the censuses is given in the table below.

Year	Population	Gender ratio	Annual growth rate (%)	Density (per km^{2})
1911	5,638,749	N/A	N/A	38
1920	5,573,788	N/A	-0.13	38
1930	5,532,574	N/A	-0.07	38
1941–42	6,283,649	N/A	1.16	43
1952–54	8,256,625	96.8	2.27	56
1961	9,412,996	97.0	1.64	64
1971	11,555,983	101.4	2.05	79
1981	15,022,839	105.0	2.62	102
1991	18,491,097	99.5	2.08	126
2001	23,151,423	98.8	2.25	157
2011	26,494,504	94.2	1.35	180
2021	29,164,578	95.6	0.92	198

== Controversies ==
Experts from various sectors have critiqued the census for producing wrong data.

=== Languages ===
The census has been critiqued for showing too many language speakers. They've laid issues with pointing foreign languages as mother tongue in Nepal. There are controversies around what consists of a language and what consists of a dialect.
