= Biruwa Rural Municipality =

Biruwa बिरुवा
- Gaupalika
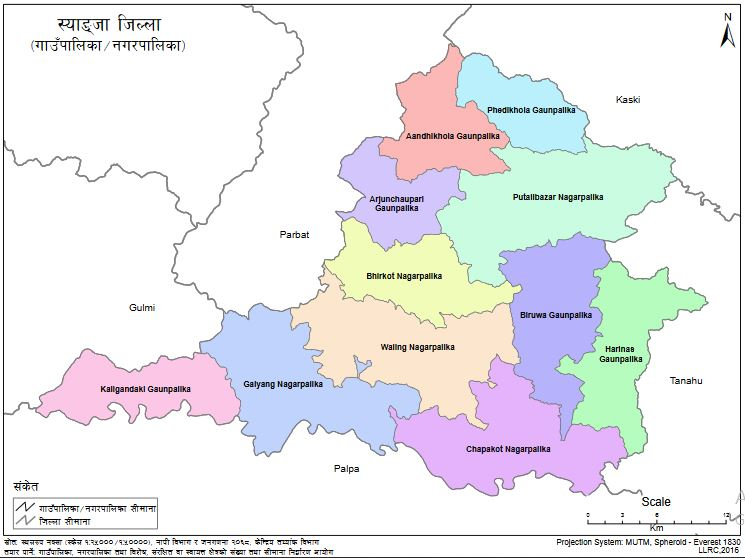
- Biruwa village council in the map of Syangja District

- Location in Nepal Biruwa (Nepal)
- Coordinates: 27.95°N 83.56°E
- Country: Nepal
- Nepalese Federal States: Gandaki Province
- District: Syangja District
- Established: 12 March 2017

Area
  - Total: 95.79 km^{2} (36.98 sq mi)

Population (2011 Nepal census)
  - Total: 18,413
  - Density: 192.2/km^{2} (497.9/sq mi)
- Time zone: UTC+5:45 (Nepal Time)
- Website: biruwamun.gov.np/

Biruwa (Nepali: बिरुवा) is a Village council in Syangja District in Gandaki Province, central Nepal.

== History ==
On 12 March 2017, the government of Nepal implemented a new local administrative structure consisting of 744 local units. In the new local administrative structure, VDCs have been replaced with municipal & village councils. Biruwa is one of these 744 local units. Biruwa was created by merging Biruwa Archale, (4–8) Wards of Rangvang, (3–9) Wards of Pelkachaur, Oraste, Manakamana, (1–6) Wards of Chinnebas & (1–5,7) wards of Kichnas.

== Political situation ==
Biruwa is divided into 8 Wards. It is surrounded by Putalibazar to the north, Harinas & Tanahun District to the east, Bhirkot & Waling to the west and Chapakot to the south. Biruwa Archale is its headquarter.

== Population ==
As Biruwa is created by merging Biruwa Archale, (4–8) Wards of Rangvang, (3,9) Wards of Pelkachaur, Oraste, Manakamana, (1–6) Wards of Chinnebas & (1–5,7) wards of Kichnas. The sum population of Biruwa, 18,413, is residing in an area of 95.79 km^{2}.
