= Galyang Municipality =

Galyang गल्याङ
- Municipality
- Galyang in Syangja District

- Ward level of Galyang

- Location in Gandaki Province Galyang (Nepal)
- Coordinates: 27.939422°N 83.635153°E
- Country: Nepal
- Nepalese Federal States: Gandaki Province
- District: Syangja District
- Established: 12 March 2017

Government
  - Mayor: Bhuparaj Adhikari (NCP)
  - Deputy Mayor: Devi Thapa Magar (CPN (US))

Area
  - Total: 122.69 km^{2} (47.37 sq mi)

Population (2011 Nepal census)
  - Total: 36,967
  - Density: 301.30/km^{2} (780.37/sq mi)
- Time zone: UTC+5:45 (Nepal Time)
- Website: galyangmun.gov.np

Galyang (Nepali: गल्याङ) is a Municipality in Syangja District in Gandaki Province, central Nepal. On 12 March 2017, the government of Nepal implemented the new local administrative structure consisting of 744 local units. With the implementation of this new local administrative structure, VDCs have been replaced with village councils. Galyang is one of these 744 local municipal units. Galyang is created by merging Malunga, Jagatradevi, (1-6,9) Wards of Pakwadi, (1,6-9) Wards of Tindobate, Tulsibhanjyang, Nibuwakharka, Pindikhola, Batuwa & (1-4,7-9) Wards of Pelakot.

== Political situation ==
Galyang is divided into 11 Wards. It is surrounded by Parbat District on the north, Chapakot Municipality & Waling on the east, Kaligandaki and Gulmi District one the west and Palpa District on the south. Jagatradevi is its headquarter.

== Population ==
Year	Population	Female	Male
2011	37,821	-	-
2021	31,034	16,880	14,154

== Merger ==
Galyang is created by merging Malunga, Jagatradevi, (1-6,9) Wards of Pakwadi, (1,6-9) Wards of Tindobate, Tulsibhanjyang, Nibuwakharka, Pindikhola & (1-4,7-9) Wards of Pelakot. The sum population of Galyang, 36,967, is residing in an area of 122.69 km^{2}.
