= Arjun Chaupari Rural Municipality =

Rural municipality in Gandaki Province, Nepal

Arjun Chaupari अर्जुनचौपारी
- Rural municipality
- Arjun Chaupari in Syangja District

- Location in Gandaki Province Arjun Chaupari (Nepal)
- Coordinates: 28.080765°N 83.761311°E
- Country: Nepal
- Nepalese Federal States: Gandaki Province
- District: Syangja District
- Established: 12 March 2017

Area
  - Total: 57.22 km^{2} (22.09 sq mi)

Population (2011 Nepal census)
  - Total: 16,176
  - Density: 282.7/km^{2} (732.2/sq mi)
- Time zone: UTC+5:45 (Nepal Time)
- Website: arjunchauparimun.gov.np

Arjun Chaupari (Nepali: अर्जुनचौपारी) is a rural municipality in Syangja District in Gandaki Province, central Nepal. On 12 March 2017, the government of Nepal implemented a new local administrative structure consisting of 744 local units. With the implementation of the new local administrative structure, VDCs have been replaced with municipal & village councils. Arjun Chaupari is one of these 744 local units. Arjun Chaupari was created by merging Rapakot, Aruchaur, Sataudarau & (3,7) Wards of Panchamul.

== Political situation ==
Arjun Chaupari is divided into 6 Wards. It is surrounded by Aandhikhola at northern side, Putalibazar from east, Parbat District from west and Bhirkot Municipality at south. The office of the village council is that of the former Arjun Chaupari.

== Population ==
The total population of Arjun Chaupari, 16,176, is residing in an area of 57.22 km^{2}.

== Notable People's ==
- Sandeep Lamichhane
