= Kaligandaki Rural Municipality, Syangja =

Kaligandaki कालिगण्डकी
- Gaupalika
- Kaligandaki in Syangja District

- Location in Gandaki Province Kaligandaki (Nepal)
- Coordinates: 27.953728°N 83.512351°E
- Country: Nepal
- Nepalese Federal States: Gandaki Province
- District: Syangja District
- Established: 12 March 2017

Area
  - Total: 73.51 km^{2} (28.38 sq mi)

Population (2011 Nepal census)
  - Total: 21,728
  - Density: 295.6/km^{2} (765.5/sq mi)
- Time zone: UTC+5:45 (Nepal Time)
- Website: kaligandakimunsyangja.gov.np

Kaligandaki (Nepali: कालिगण्डकी) is a Village council in Syangja District in Gandaki Province, central Nepal. On 12 March 2017, the government of Nepal implemented a new local administrative structure consisting of 744 local units. With the implementation of the new local administrative structure, VDCs have been replaced with municipal & village councils. Kaligandaki is one of these 744 local units. Kaligandaki is created by merging Alamdevi, Birgha Archale, Chandibhanjyang & Shreekrishna Gandaki.

== Political situation ==
Kaligandaki is divided into 7 Wards. It is surrounded by Galyang Municipality, Kaligandaki Rural Municipality, Gulmi, and Satyawati Rural Municipality at northern side, Galyang Municipality from east, Tansen Municipality from west and Tansen Municipality and Bagnaskali Rural Municipality at south. Birgha Archale is its headquarter.

== Population ==
As Kaligandaki is created by merging Alamdevi, Birgha Archale, Chandibhanjyang and Shreekrishna Gandaki. The total population of Kaligandaki, 21,728, is residing in an area of 73.51 km^{2}.
