= Harinas Rural Municipality =

Harinas हरिनास
- Gaupalika
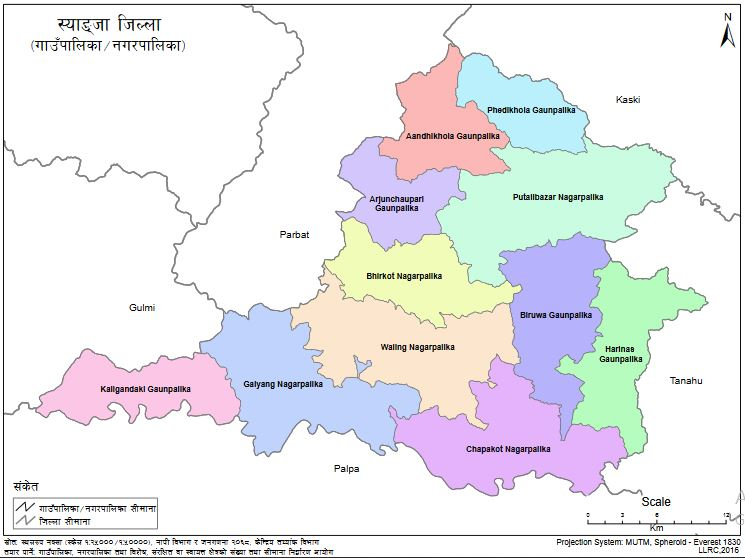
- Harinas village council in the map of Syangja Districtl

- Location in Nepal Harinas (Nepal)
- Coordinates: 28°0′N 83°59′E
- Country: Nepal
- Nepalese Federal States: Gandaki Province
- District: Syangja District
- Established: 12 March 2017

Area
  - Total: 87.48 km^{2} (33.78 sq mi)

Population (2011 Nepal census)
  - Total: 17,343
  - Density: 198.3/km^{2} (513.5/sq mi)
- Time zone: UTC+5:45 (Nepal Time)
- Website: http://harinasmun.gov.np/

Harinas (Nepali: हरिनास) is a Village council in Syangja District in Gandaki Province, central Nepal.

== History ==
On 12 March 2017, the government of Nepal implemented a new local administrative structure consisting of 744 local units. With the implementation of the new local administrative structure, VDCs have been replaced with municipal & village councils. Harinas is one of these 744 local units. Harinas is created by merging Magyam Chisapani, Chitre Bhanjyang, (7-9) wards of Chinnebas, Kyakami & (6,8,9) wards of Kichnas.

== Political situation ==
Harinas is divided into 7 Wards. It is surrounded by Tanahun District at northern side, Tanahun District from east, Chapakot & Biruwa from west and Chapakot & Tanahun District at south. Chitre Bhanjyang is its headquarter.

== Population ==
As Harinas is created by merging Magyam Chisapani, Chitre Bhanjyang, (7-9) wards of Chinnebas, Kyakami & (6,8,9) wards of Kichnas. The sum population of Harinas, 17,343, is residing in an area of 87.48 km^{2}.
