= Aandhikhola Rural Municipality =

Aandhikhola आँधिखोला
- Gaupalika
- Aandhikhola in Syangja District

- Location in Gandaki Province Aandhikhola (Nepal)
- Coordinates: 28°6′N 83°45′E
- Country: Nepal
- Province: Gandaki Province
- District: Syangja District
- Established: 12 March 2017

Area
  - Total: 69.61 km^{2} (26.88 sq mi)

Population (2011 Nepal census)
  - Total: 16,589
  - Density: 238.3/km^{2} (617.2/sq mi)
- Time zone: UTC+5:45 (Nepal Time)
- Website: aandhikholamun.gov.np

Aandhikhola (Nepali: आँधिखोला) is a Gaupalika in Syangja District in the Gandaki Province of central Nepal. On 12 March 2017, the government of Nepal implemented a new local administrative structure consisting of 753 local units. With the implementation of the new local administrative structure, the previous VDCs were replaced by municipal & village councils. Aandhikhola was created by merging Faparthum, Chilaunebas, Bichari Chautara, Wangsing Deurali, Setidobhan & (1,2,4-6,8,9) Wards of Panchamul.

== Political situation ==
Aandhikhola is divided into 6 Wards. It is surrounded by Fedikhola to the north, Putalibazar & Fedikhola to the east, Parbat District to the west and Putalibazar & Arjun Chaupari to the south. Krishee is its headquarter.

== Population ==
Aandhikhola was created by merging Faparthum, Chilaunebas, Bichari Chautara, Wangsing Deurali, Setidobhan & (1,2,4-6,8,9) Wards of Panchamul. The sum population of Aandhikhola, 16,589, is residing in an area of 69.61 km^{2}.
