= Phedikhola Rural Municipality =

Phedikhola फेदिखोला
- Gaupalika
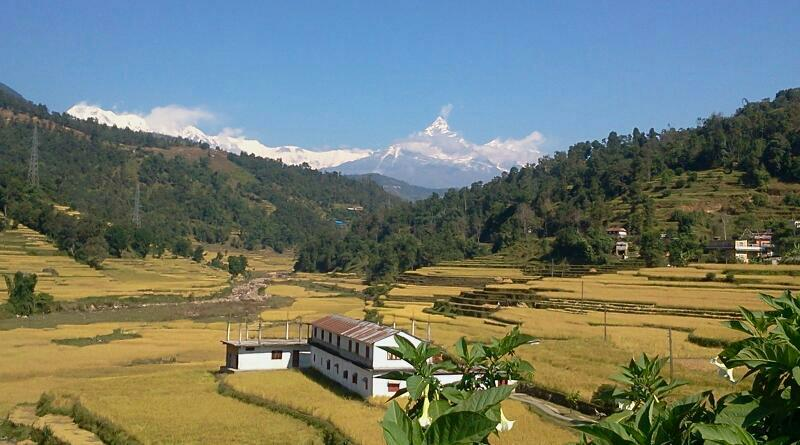
- Phedikhola

- Location within Gandaki Province Location within Nepal
- Coordinates: 28.16°N 83.91°E
- Country: Nepal
- Nepalese Federal States: Gandaki Province
- District: Syangja District
- Established: 12 March 2017

Area
  - Total: 56.73 km^{2} (21.90 sq mi)

Population (2011 Nepal census)
  - Total: 12,341
  - Density: 217.5/km^{2} (563.4/sq mi)
- Time zone: UTC+5:45 (Nepal Time)
- Website: phedikholamun.gov.np

Phedikhola (Nepali: फेदिखोला) is a Village council in Syangja District in Gandaki Province, central Nepal.

== History ==
Phedikhola was a village development committee in Syangja District in the Gandaki Zone of central Nepal. At the time of the 2011 Nepal census it had a population of 6183 people living in 1645 individual households. On 12 March 2017, the government of Nepal implemented a new local administrative structure consisting of 744 local units. With the implementation of the new local administrative structure, VDCs have been replaced with municipal & village councils. Phedikhola is one of those village councils out of 744 local units. Phedikhola is created by merging Bagephatake, Bhatkhola, Arukharka & Fedikhola itself.

== Political situation ==
Phedikhola is divided into 5 Wards. It is surrounded by Kaski District at northern side, Kaski District from east, Aandhikhola from west and Putalibazar & Aandhikhola at south. Fedikhola is its headquarter.

== Population ==
As Phedikhola is created by merging Bagephadke, Bhatkhola, Arukharka and Fedikhola itself. The sum population of Phedikhola, 12,341, is residing in an area of 56.73 km^{2}.
