= Bhirkot Municipality =

Bheerkot Municipality भीरकोट नगरपालिका
- Municipality
- Bheerkot in Syangja District

- Location in Gandaki Pradesh Bheerkot Municipality (Nepal)
- Coordinates (Bheerkot): 28°2′12″N 83°47′58″E
- Country: Nepal
- Region: Western Region
- Zone: Gandaki Zone
- District: Syangja District
- Established: 18 September 2015

Government
  - Mayor: Govinda Kumar Karmacharya
  - Deputy Mayor: Bhagawati Regmi Aryal

Area
  - Total: 78.23 km^{2} (30.20 sq mi)

Population (2011 Nepal census)
  - Total: 18,134
  - Density: 231.8/km^{2} (600.4/sq mi)
- Time zone: UTC+5:45 (NST)
- Postal code: 33811
- Area code: 063
- Website: http://bheerkotmun.gov.np/

Bheerkot is a municipality in Syangja District of Gandaki Zone of central Nepal. The new municipality was formed by merging four existing villages—Banethok Deurali, Darsing Dahathum, Dhapuk Simal Bhanjyang and Khilung Deurali—on 18 September 2015. It has 9 wards. The office of the municipality is that of the former Darsing Dahathum village development committee's Bayarghari Bazaar.

Bheerkot is formed by merging four village development committees (VDCs): Banethok Deurali, Darsing Dahathum, Dhapuk Simal Bhanjyang and Khilung Deurali. The total population of these four VDCs is 18,134.

== Background ==
Bheerkot was named by the locals of Banethok Deurali, Darsing Dahathum, Dhapuk Simal Bhanjyang-phoxing and Khilung Deurali. It is a famous historical place.
