= Keware =

Keware may refer to:

- Keware, Mawal, Pune district, Maharashtra, India
- Keware Bhanjyang, Nepal

== See also ==
- Ke ware, a type of Chinese cheladon
