= Bhatkhola (disambiguation) =

Bhatkhola may refer to:

- Bhatkhola, village development committee in Syangja District
- Bhotkhola Rural Municipality, rural municipality in Sankhuwasabha District
