= Saldanda Village (Kichanas) =

Saldanda
- village
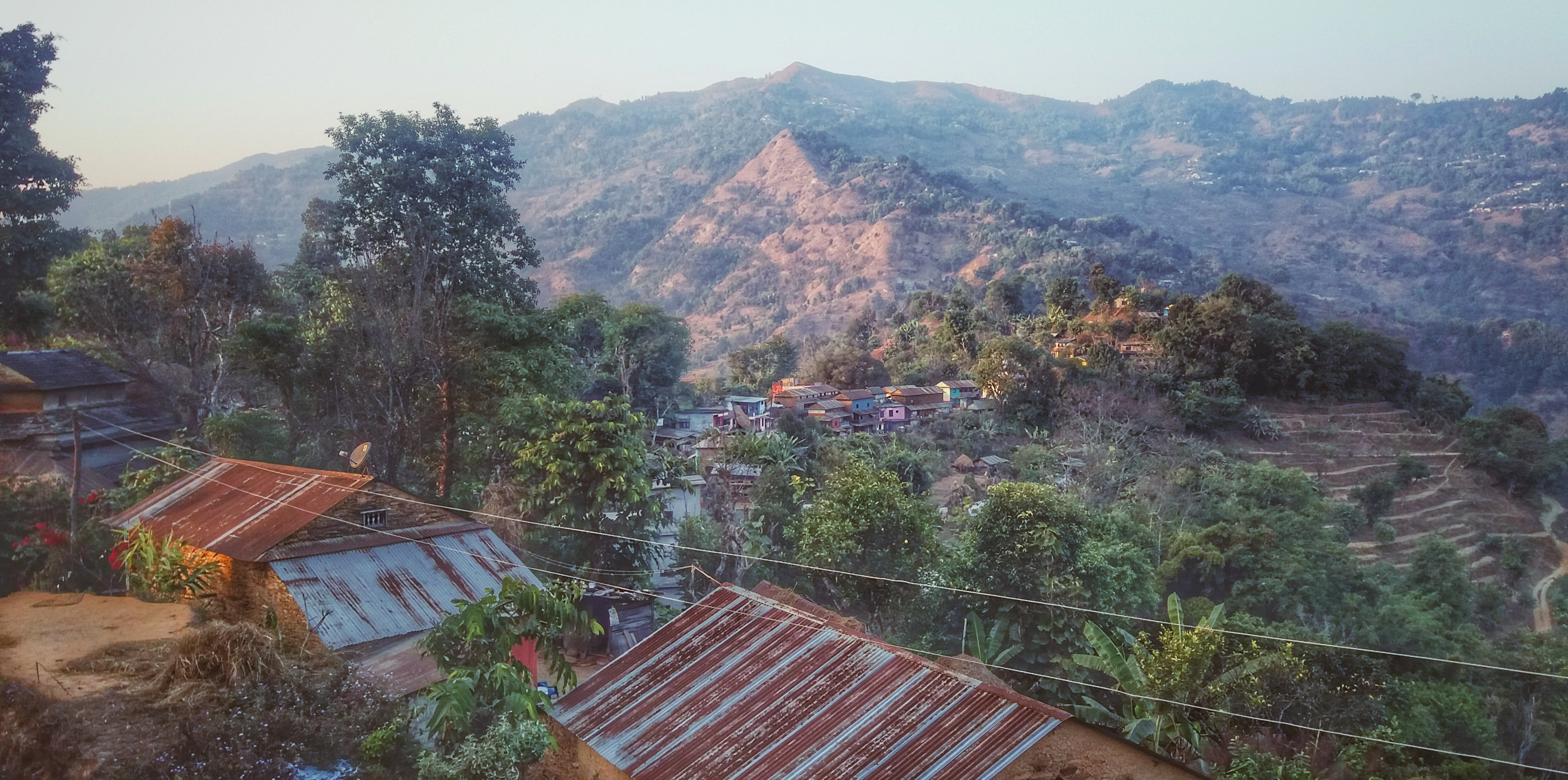
- Nickname: हट्टिया
- Motto: आजको निकास सालडाँडा गाउँको समग्र विकास
- Saldanda in Map of Nepal. Saldanda (Nepal)
- Coordinates: 28.015082°N 83.963843°E
- Country: Nepal
- Province: Gandaki Province
- District: Syangja District

Population (2068 BS)
  - Total: २०००
- Time zone: UTC+5:45 (Nepali Time)
- Area code: 063

Saldanda Village (Kichanas) (Nepali: नेपाली:सालडाँडा गाउँ) is a village of Nepal. This village is located in Kichanas VDC wad no: 9 and Syangja in the Gandaki Zone after present Nepali governmental policy. But saldanda Village located at Harinas Gaupalika wad no: 1.

== Population ==
More than 2000 people live in this village.

== Photos gallery ==
- Few famous picture collection of Saldanda Village

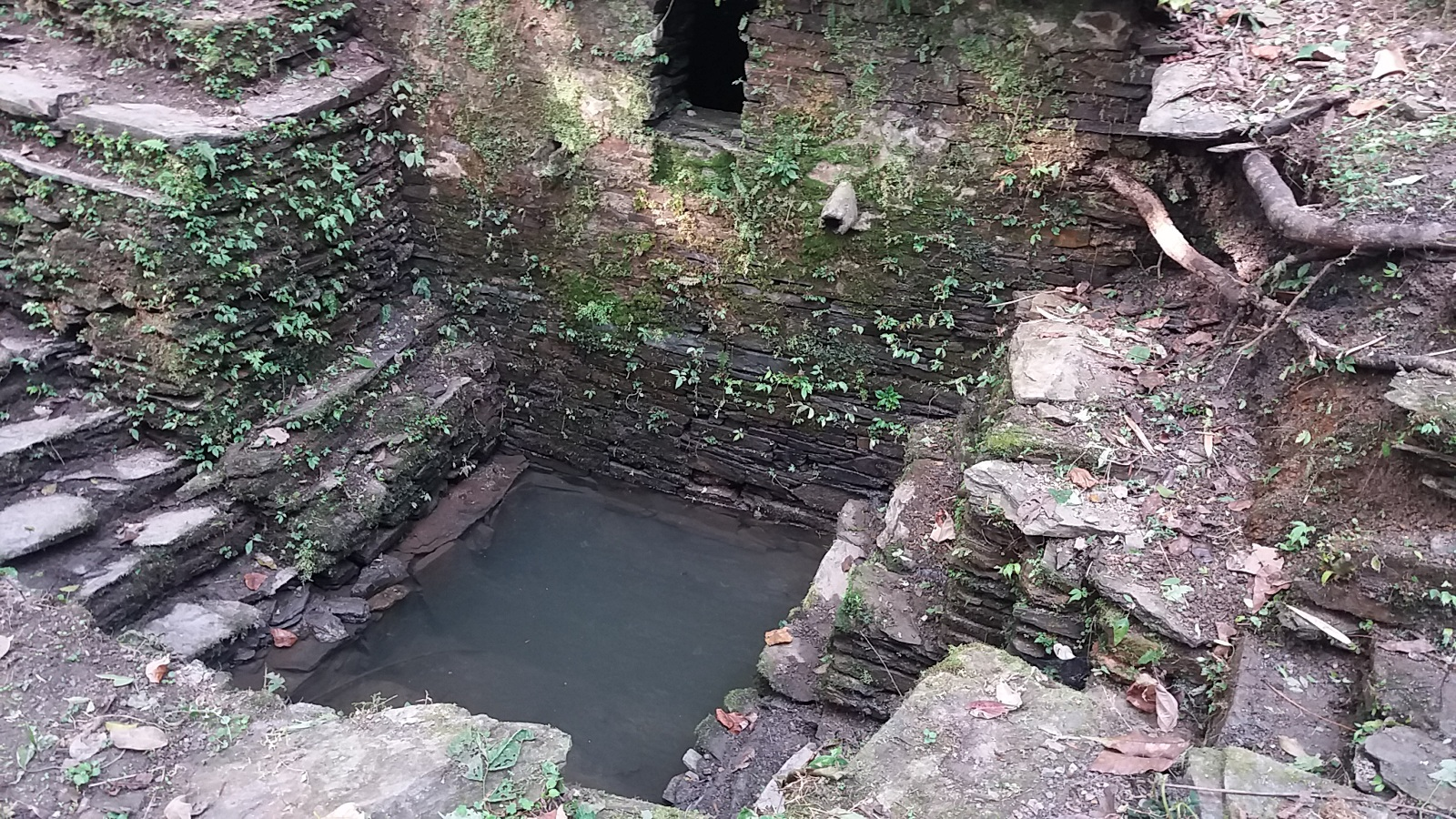
