= Dhanubase =

Coordinates: 27°56′N 83°41′E

Dhanubase धनुबासे
- Village development committee
- Location in Nepal Dhanubase (Nepal)
- Country: Nepal
- Zone: Gandaki Zone
- District: Syangja District

Population (1991)
  - Total: 3,509
- Time zone: UTC+5:45 (Nepal Time)

Dhanubase is a village development committee in Syangja District in the Gandaki Zone of central Nepal. At the time of the 1991 Nepal census it had a population of 3,509 people living in 666 individual households.
