= Rangethanti =

Rangethanti रंगेठाँटी
- Town
- Location in Nepal Rangethanti (Nepal)
- Coordinates: 28°9′1″N 83°49′25″E
- Country: Nepal
- Province: Gandaki
- District: Syangja District
- Rural Municipality: Aandhikhola
- Ward No: 5
- Lowest elevation: 928 m (3,045 ft)

Population
  - Ethnicities: Brahmin Chhetri Dalits Newar Gurung Magar
  - Religion: Hinduism
- Time zone: GMT +5:45
- Postal Code: 33807
- Area code: 063
- Website: www.facebook.com/rangethanti

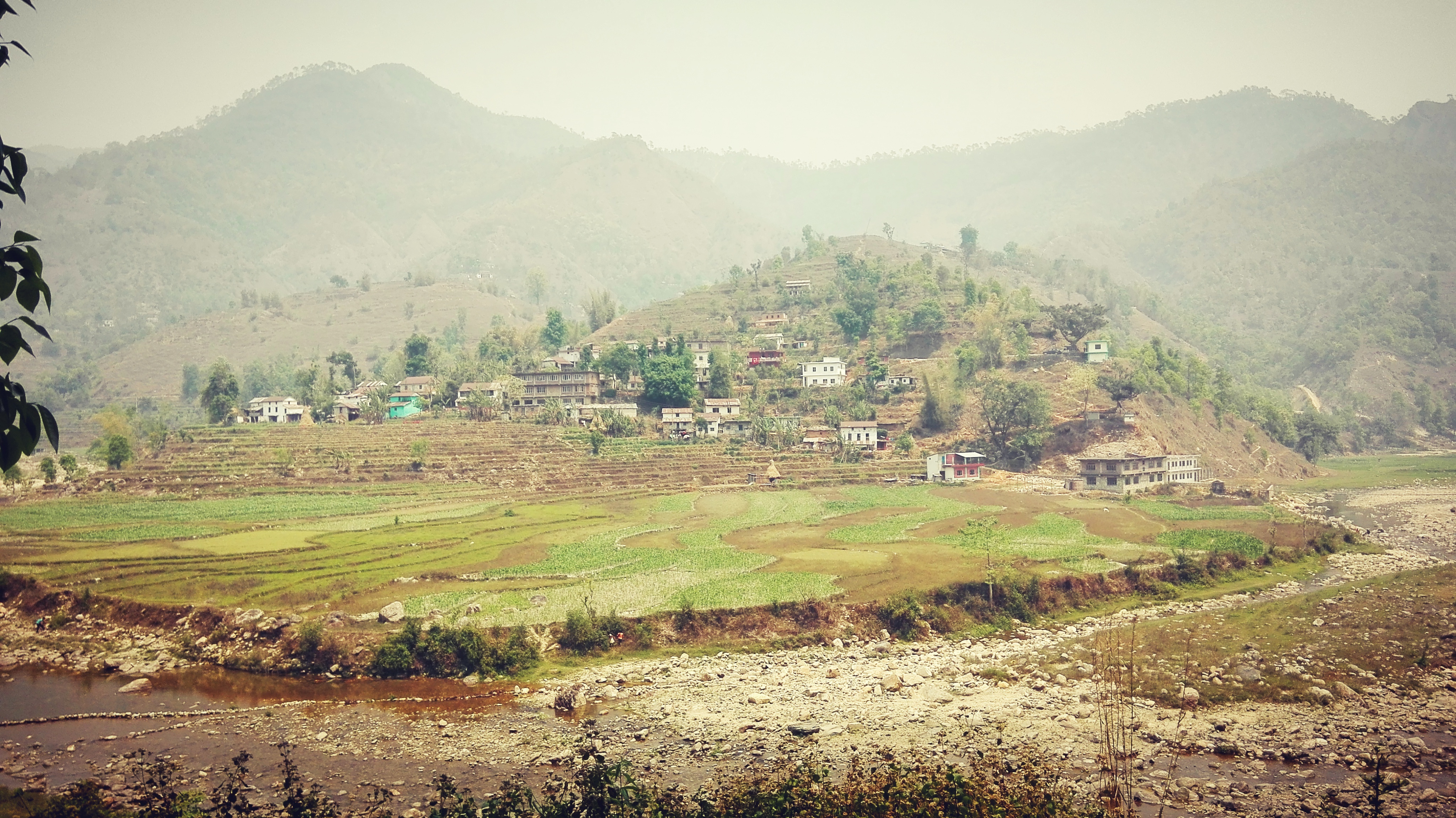
Panorama of Rangethanti. This photo was captured during the dry season before monsoon. At this time the water level on the Andhikhola river is at its minimum.

Rangethanti (Nepali: रंगेठाँटी) is a village town located in ward number 5 of Aandhikhola Rural Municipality in the Syangja District, Nepal. It is recognized as a major educational hub within the municipality. The village town lies approximately 15 kilometres northwest of the district headquarters, Putalibazar, and about 33 kilometres southwest of Pokhara, the second-largest city in Nepal and the capital of the Gandaki Province. The renowned religious river, Andhikhola (आंधीखोला), flows near the town.

Rangethanti's landscape includes forests, water bodies, cultivated lands, and religious landmarks. The village town also serves as a market centre, providing essential commodities for neighbouring villages such as SaniBarage, Baskot, Ranguwa, Chhapa, and Sera.

The settlement is segmented into Mathillo Rangethanti (Upper Rangethanti) and Tallo Rangethanti (Lower Rangethanti). Pradhyumna Paneru High School, a prominent educational institution, is located centrally between these two areas.

Historically, Tallo Rangethanti has been an older settlement along the famed Baglung-Batauli trade route. At the same time, Mathillo Rangethanti has developed more recently along the Nagdanda-Karkineta Motor Road, reflecting the town’s ongoing expansion.

== Geography ==
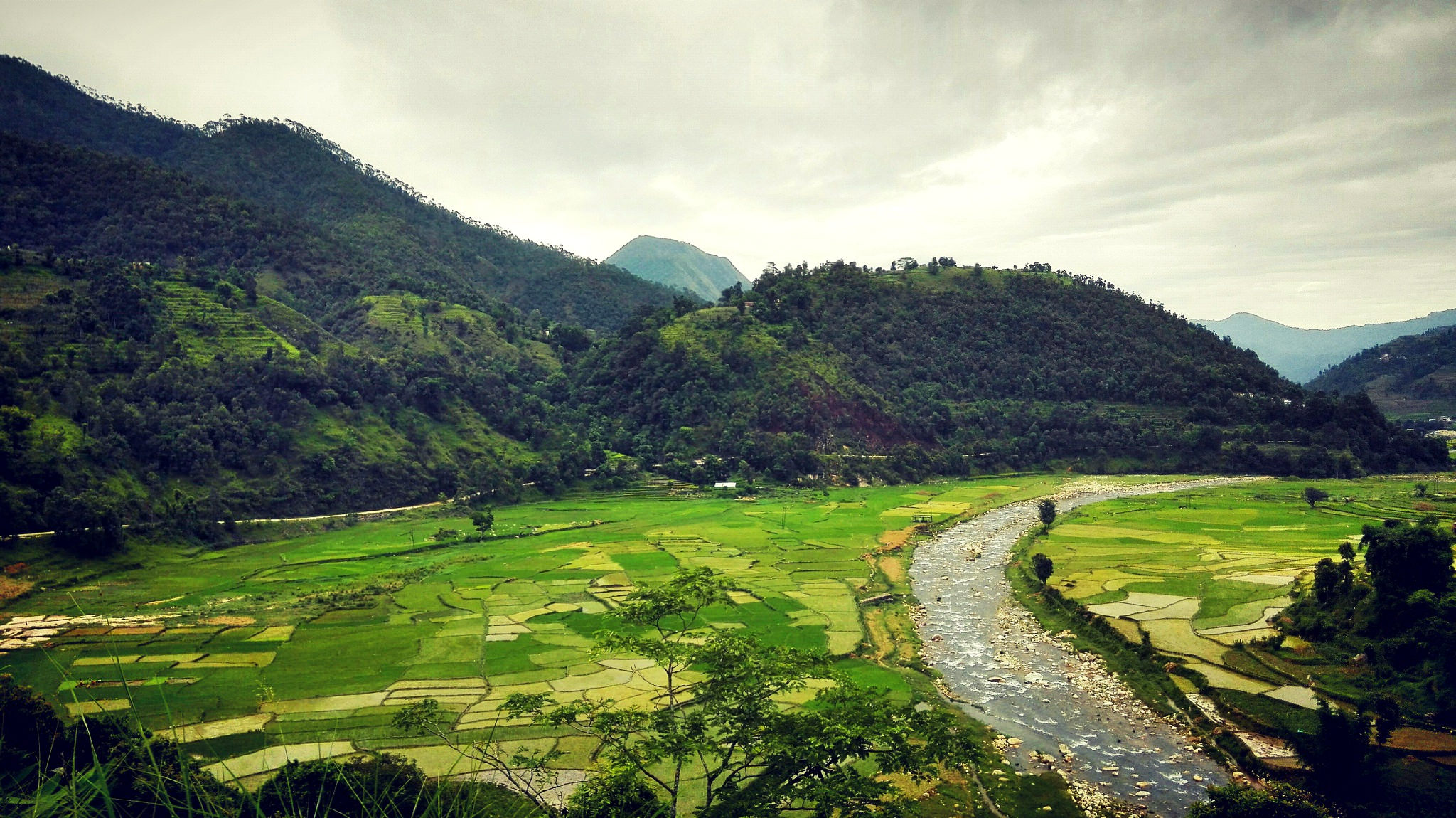
Paddy fields along Adhikhola river valley as seen from Rangethanti

Rangethanti lies in Andhikhola River Valley within middle hills of Nepal. Although, the elevation change is very rapid within the surrounding area, Rangethanti is at a considerable distance apart from the landslide prone areas and also considered comparatively safer from flood since it is at safer elevation from the river bed. Andhikhola is the main river flowing nearby the town and stretches west to east. Several other tributaries meet this river within short stretch from Rangethanti. Viewing south and north of the town, one can see very precipitous hilly range which is covered with lush green forests and holds some scattered villages.

Extending on both sides of the Andhikhola river, the land has been turned into terraced plots since generations for cultivation of crops.

== History ==
The date regarding the first human settlement around Rangethanti area is not obvious. But it is believed that it dates back earlier to 15th century. During the demolition of the very old inn built by Pradhyumna Paneru at Ranguwa Rangethanti, a wooden script marked with 1640 BS was found which suggests that the Paneru and people from various other clans and surnames had been living here before 15th century.

The belief on how this place was named as Rangethanti is linked with the same old inn that was built by Pradhyumna Paneru. The inn was very attractive and colourful in terms of its appearance and the wooden carvings used on the frames, pillars, doors and windows. In Nepali, colourful and attractive is termed as rangin(रंगीन) and the inn translates to Thanti(ठाँटी). Thus, giving a meaning as "colourful inn".

== Climate ==
Based on altitude, Rangethanti falls under sub tropical climate zone. It experiences warm and temperate climate. The temperature during summer ranges between 20 and 30 degree Celsius and the winter temperature ranges between 7-22 degree Celsius. The summer here is considered wet season since it experiences good deal of rainfall while winter is dry with very little rainfall. November witnesses the least amount of rainfall (monthly average of 2mm) whereas maximum precipitation occurs in July averaging 697 mm.

== Economy ==
Just a decade back, a majority of the families were involved in subsistence agriculture. However, there's a significant change lately. At least a family member is involved either as a government worker, local shop owner or migrant worker. The families are still involved in subsistence farming. However, people have growing interest towards cash crops (vegetables and fruits) over the conventional crops. Almost all of the families are above the poverty line. With the increasing access to the banking field through local cooperatives and mother groups, the families now have increased economic leverage.

== Transportation ==
Before there were any motorable roads, walking was the only way of transportation. Along the famous Baglung-Batauli trade route, people used to carry heavy loads on their backs using accessories like Doko and Namlo. People used to travel as far as Bhairahawa on the South and Thakkhola on the north for trading purposes. Limited wealthy people used to ride horses. Mules were used mainly for transporting the daily commodities from Batauli by traders. Alongside the trade route, several tea houses were sprawled that used to serve food and accommodation to the travellers and traders. Tallo Rangethanti saw boom in economic activities during the time with increasing number of shops and tea houses mainly for serving traders. The route witnessed daily flux of hundreds of travellers, traders, horses and mules.

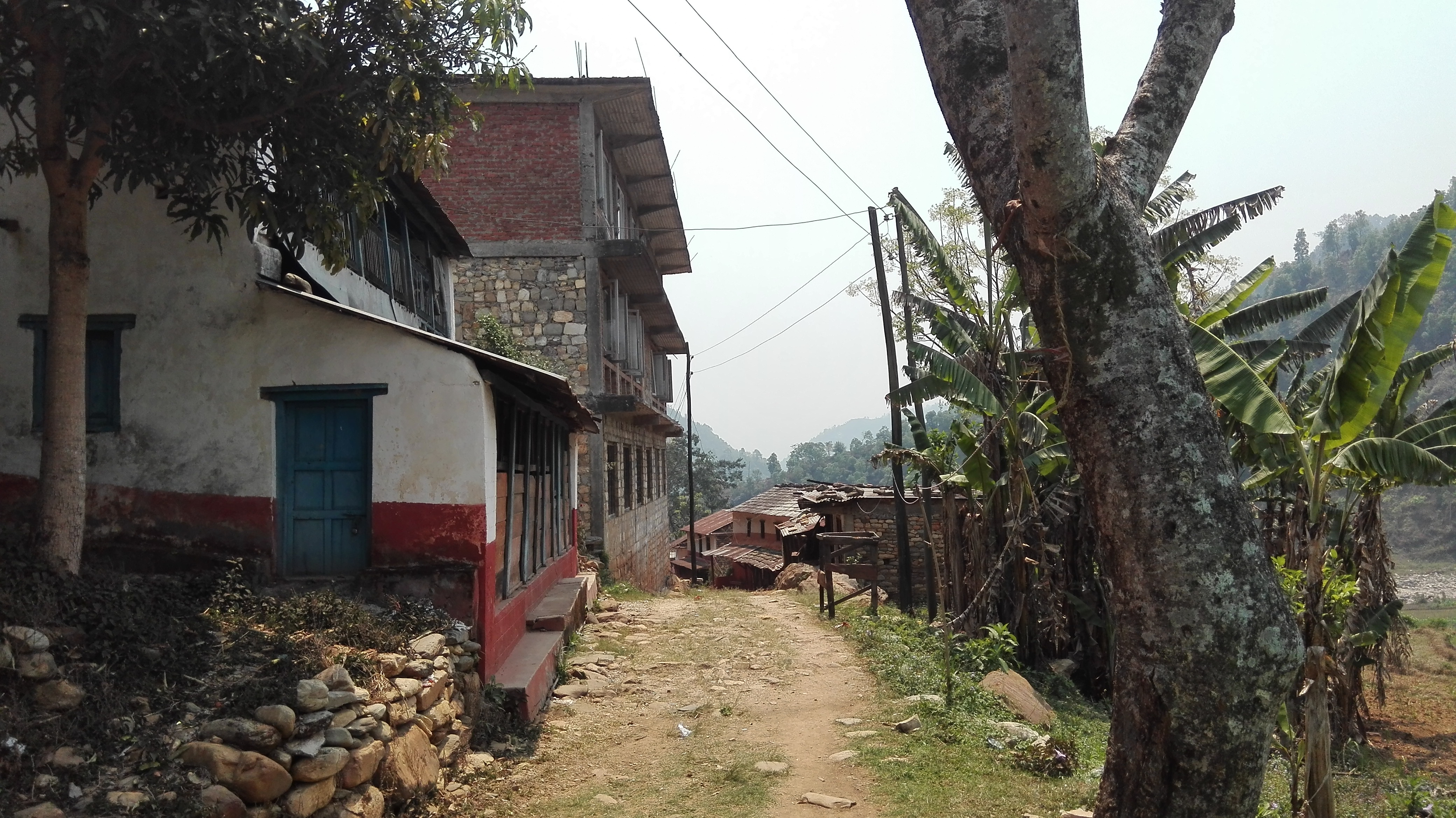
A section of old Baglung Batauli trade route at Rangethanti

After the commissioning of Siddhartha and Bhupi-Sherchan highway, the Baglung-Batauli route became obsolete. With further development of the Nagdanda-Karkineta motorable road, the settlement boom shifted alongside this new motorway. As the result, Mathillo Rangethanti sprawled out.

Currently, public buses operate regularly to and from Pokhara and as far as Lunkhu Deurali and Darau-Sirubari. Located 33 km away from Pokhara, Rangethanti is very accessible. Traders now own their private trucks, jeeps, tractors and two wheelers and can deliver their products up to the consumer's doorsteps.

== Culture ==
Inhabitants of the town actively follow and preserve their culture and traditions, rooted in their respective ethnic backgrounds, including diverse groups such as Brahmins, Chhetris, Magars, Gurungs, and Dalits. Each community celebrates its own festivals, rituals, and customs, reflecting the rich cultural mosaic of Nepal. However, with hundreds of years of peaceful coexistence and intercommunity interactions, cultural assimilation is widely observed. Traditions like Dashain, Tihar, and Maghe Sankranti are celebrated by nearly all, transcending ethnic lines. Shared practices, intermarriage, and mutual respect have fostered a harmonious blend of customs, creating a unique cultural identity that reflects both the diversity and unity of the people of Rangethanti and the wider Syangja district.

== Education ==
Rangethanti shares deep connection with education since it has served as an educational center for more than five decades. First educational institution established here was in form of a primitive Sasnskrit School before 2008 BS. With consecutive developments year after year, till this date, Rangethanti can be marked with well organized Pradhumna Paneru Secondary School (under the affiliation of Government of Nepal), Pradhumna Paneru Higher Secondary School (affiliated under Higher Secondary Education Board) and Pradhumna Paneru Multiple Campus (affiliated with Tribhuwan University).

=== Timeline on Development of Educational Institutions in Rangethanti ===
2007 Falgun 13 - Establishment of the first educational institute as Sanskrit School.

2008 Bhadrapada 16 - Establishment of Ranguwa Rangethanti Primary School

2016 - Ranguwa Rangethanti Primary School upgraded as Rangethanti Middle School

2025 Chaitra 14 - Establishment of Pradhyumna Paneru Secondary School.

2053 Shrawan 1 - Establishment of Pradhyumna Paneru Higher Secondary School.

2062 - Establishment of Pradhyumna Paneru Multiple Campus

== Sport ==
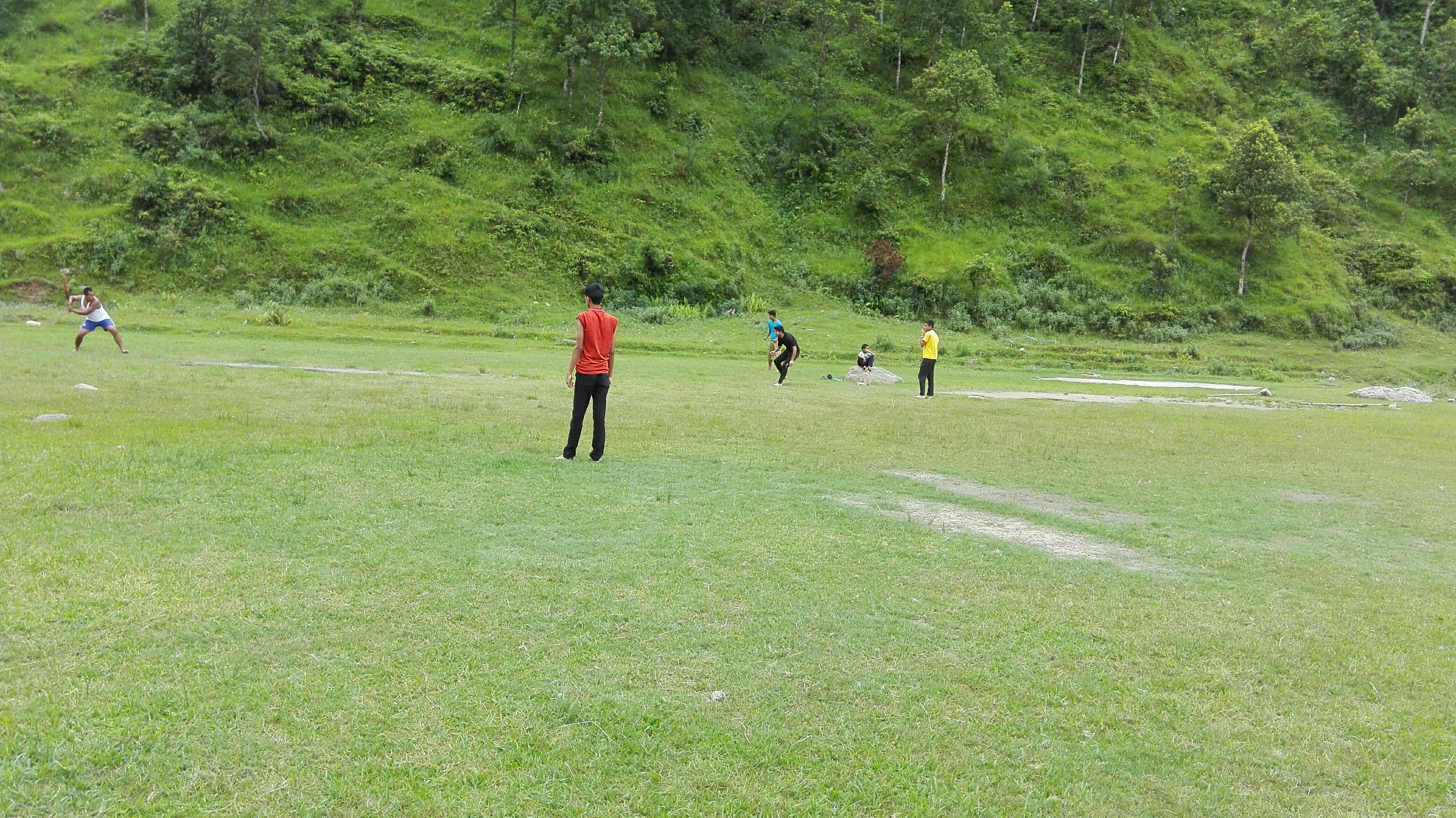
A group of teenagers seen playing cricket on the other side of the Andhikhola river.

The sport is limited within the kids and the teenagers. Only boys are seen playing games like football, volleyball, cricket, etc. There are no proper play grounds. The assembly ground of the school is often used for playing which is pretty rough and hard in nature. After the harvesting of rice, some of the farming fields are usually used as playing ground which are comparatively softer.
