= Pekhuwa Baghakhor =

Pekhu Baghkhor पेखु बाघखोर
- Village development committee
- Country: Nepal
- Zone: Gandaki Zone
- District: Syangja District

Population (1991)
  - Total: 4,436
- Time zone: UTC+5:45 (Nepal Time)

Pekhuwa Baghakhor is a village development committee in Syangja District in the Gandaki Zone of central Nepal. At the time of the 1991 Nepal census it had a population of 4436 people living in 805 individual households.
