= Karendanda =

Karendanda करेनडाँडा
- Village development committee
- Country: Nepal
- Zone: Gandaki Zone
- District: Syangja District

Population (1991)
  - Total: 4,217
- Time zone: UTC+5:45 (Nepal Time)

Karendanda is a village development committee in Syangja District in the Gandaki Zone of central Nepal. At the time of the 1991 Nepal census it had a population of 4217 people living in 826 individual households.
