= Sataudarau =

Coordinates: 28°7′N 83°48′E

Daraun दरौं
- Village development committee
- Location in Nepal Daraun (Nepal)
- Country: Nepal
- Zone: Gandaki Zone
- District: Syangja District

Population (1991)
  - Total: 2,808
- Time zone: UTC+5:45 (Nepal Time)
- Area code: 063

Daraun is a village development committee in Syangja District in the Gandaki Zone of central Nepal. At the time of the 1991 Nepal census it had a population of 2808 people living in 550 individual households.
