= Chandikalika =

Chandikalika चण्डिकालिका
- Village development committee
- Country: Nepal
- Zone: Gandaki Zone
- District: Syangja District

Population (1991)
  - Total: 4,264
- Time zone: UTC+5:45 (Nepal Time)

Chandikalika is a village development committee in Syangja District in the Gandaki Zone of central Nepal. At the time of the 1991 Nepal census it had a population of 4264 people living in 814 individual households.
