= Satupasal =

Satupasal सातुपसल
- Village development committee
- Country: Nepal
- Zone: Gandaki Zone
- District: Syangja District

Population (1991)
  - Total: 5,210
- Time zone: UTC+5:45 (Nepal Time)

Satupasal is a village development committee in Syangja District in the Gandaki Zone of central Nepal. At the time of the 1991 Nepal census it had a population of 5210 people living in 1040 individual households.
