= Bagephatake =

Bangephadke बाँगेफड्के
- Village development committee
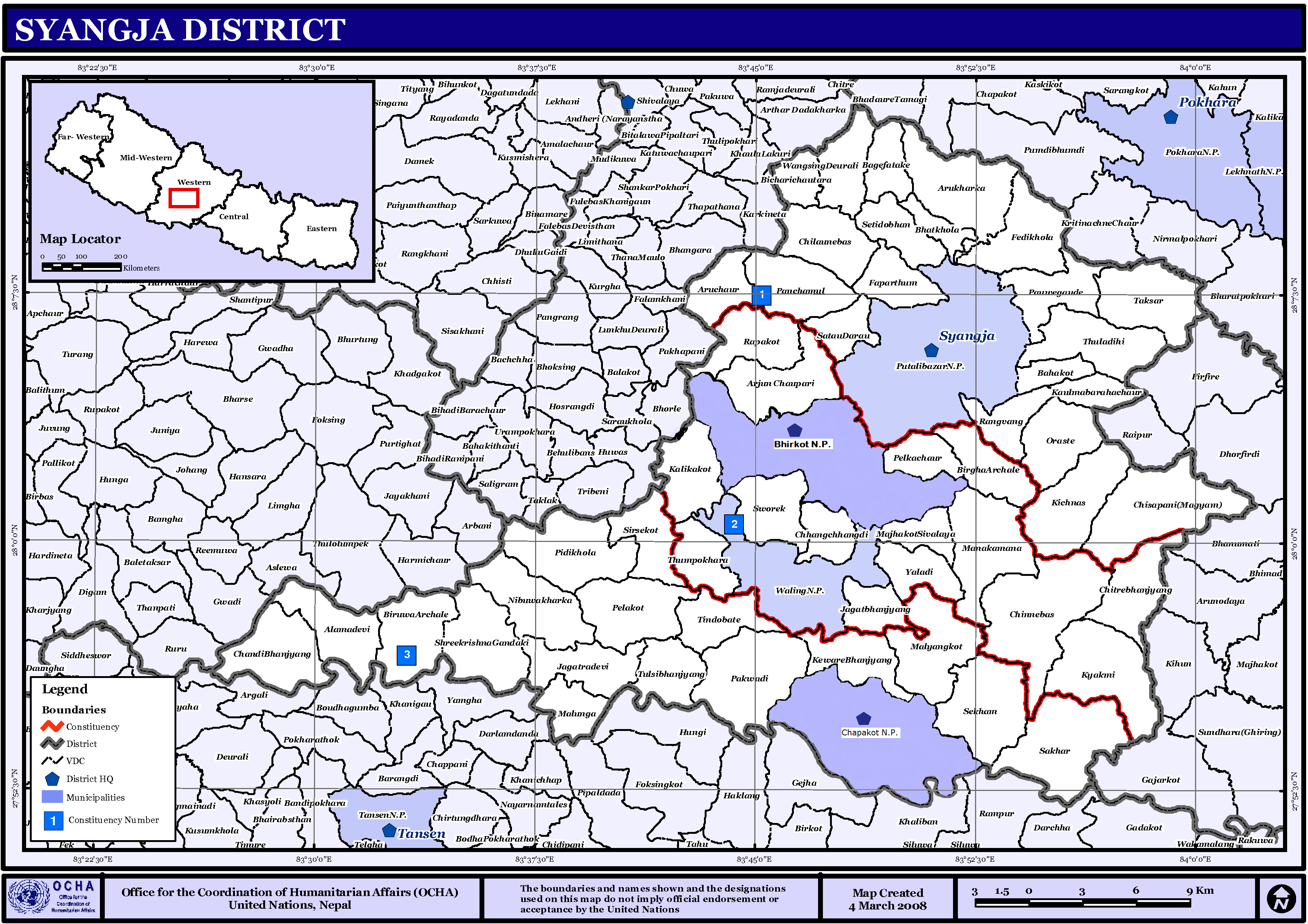

- Location in Nepal Bangephadke (Nepal)
- Coordinates: 28.19°N 83.82°E
- Country: Nepal
- Zone: Gandaki Zone
- District: Syangja District

Population (2011)
  - Total: 1,102
- Time zone: UTC+5:45 (Nepal Time)

Bangephadke is a village development committee in Syangja District in the Gandaki Zone of central Nepal. At the time of the 2011 Nepal census it had a population of 1,102 people living in 281 individual households.
