= Manakamana, Syangja =

Manakamana मनकामना
- Village development committee
- Location in Nepal Manakamana (Nepal)
- Coordinates: 28.00°N 83.88°E
- Country: Nepal
- Zone: Gandaki Zone
- District: Syangja District

Population (2011)
  - Total: 4,385
- Time zone: UTC+5:45 (Nepal Time)

Manakamana was a village development committee in Syangja District in the Gandaki Zone of central Nepal. At the time of the 2011 Nepal census it had a population of 4385 people living in 997 individual households. It is now merged to Biruwa Rural Municipality after the government of Nepal implemented a new local administrative structure in 12 March 2017.
