= Thumpokhara =

Thumpokhara थुमपोखरा
- Village development committee
- Location in Nepal Thumpokhara (Nepal)
- Coordinates: 27.99°N 83.72°E
- Country: Nepal
- Zone: Gandaki Zone
- District: Syangja District

Population (2011)
  - Total: 5,390
- Time zone: UTC+5:45 (Nepal Time)

Thumpokhara is a village development committee in Syangja District in the Gandaki Zone of central Nepal. At the time of the 2011 Nepal census it had a population of 5390 people living in 1220 individual households.
