= Sorek, Nepal =

Sworek स्वरेक
- Village development committee
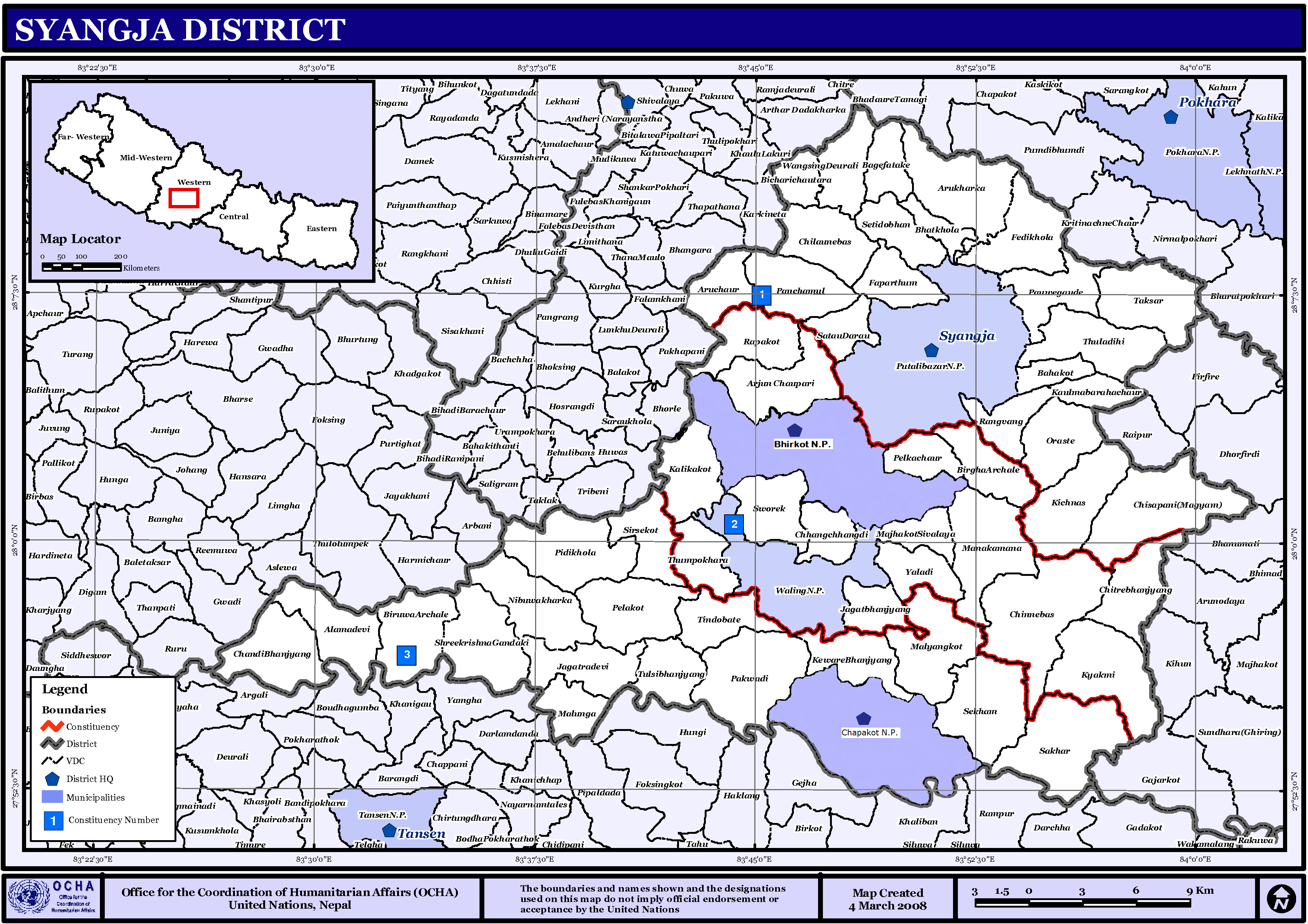

- Location in Nepal Sworek (Nepal)
- Coordinates: 28.00°N 83.75°E
- Country: Nepal
- Zone: Gandaki Zone
- District: Syangja District

Population (2011)
  - Total: 5,180
- Time zone: UTC+5:45 (Nepal Time)

Sworek is a village development committee in Syangja District in the Gandaki Zone of central Nepal. In Sworek there are 9 wards . But now according to the Nepal governments federal division Sworek VDC is converted to Municipality. Some of the part of sworek has been added to Walling municipality and some of the parts are added to the newly formed Bhirkot Municipality. At the time of the 2011 Nepal census it had a population of 5,180 people living in 1,197 individual households. Notable places in Sworek are: Maidan (paragliding spot) Bagare Bazar, Chidehar, Tapu, Thalekharka and Simle.
