= Iladi =

Iladi इलादी Yaladi
- Village development committee
- Country: Nepal
- Zone: Gandaki Zone
- District: Syangja District

Population (2011)
  - Total: 1,765
- Time zone: UTC+5:45 (Nepal Time)

Iladi is a village development committee in Syangja District in the Gandaki Zone of central Nepal. At the time of the 2011 Nepal census it had a population of 1765 people living in 417 individual households.
