= Jagat Bhanjyang =

Village development committee in Nepal

Coordinates: 27°59′N 83°49′E

Jagat Bhanjyang जगत भञ्ज्याङ
- Village development committee
- Interactive map of Jagat Bhanjyang
- Country: Nepal
- Zone: Gandaki Zone
- District: Syangja District

Population (2011)
  - Total: 3,310
- Time zone: UTC+5:45 (Nepal Time)
- Area code: 33880

Jagat Bhanjyang is a village development committee in Syangja District in the Gandaki Zone of central Nepal. At the time of the 2011 Nepal census it had a population of 3310 people living in 791 individual households.
