= Majhakot Sivalaya =

Majhkot Siwalaya माझकोट शिवालय
- Village development committee
- Location in Nepal Majhkot Siwalaya (Nepal)
- Coordinates: 28.01°N 83.84°E
- Country: Nepal
- Zone: Gandaki Zone
- District: Syangja District

Population (2011)
  - Total: 1,555
- Time zone: UTC+5:45 (Nepal Time)

Majhkot Siwalaya is a village development committee in Syangja District in the Gandaki Zone of central Nepal. At the time of the 2011 Nepal census it had a population of 1555 people living in 357 individual households.
