= Phaparthum =

Phaparthum फापरथुम
- Village development committee
- Location in Nepal Phaparthum (Nepal)
- Coordinates: 28.13°N 83.83°E
- Country: Nepal
- Zone: Gandaki Zone
- District: Syangja District

Population (2011)
  - Total: 2,412
- Time zone: UTC+5:45 (Nepal Time)

Phaparthum is situated in the northern part of Syangja. It was a Village Development Committee (VDC) in Syangja District in the Gandaki Zone of central Nepal before being incorporated into the Aandhikhola Gaunpalika, along with five other VDCs. At the time of the 2011 Nepal census, it had a population of 2,412 living in 603 households.
