= Kalikakot =

Kalikakot कालिकाकोट
- Village development committee
- Location in Nepal Kalikakot (Nepal)
- Coordinates: 28.04°N 83.71°E
- Country: Nepal
- Zone: Gandaki Zone
- District: Syangja District

Population (2011)
  - Total: 4,233
- Time zone: UTC+5:45 (Nepal Time)

Kalikakot is a village development committee in Syangja District in the Gandaki Zone of central Nepal. At the time of the 2011 Nepal census it had a population of 4233 people living in 913 individual households.
