= Chhangchhangdi =

Chhangchhangdi छाँगाछाङ्दी
- Village development committee
- Location in Nepal Chhangchhangdi (Nepal)
- Coordinates: 28.01°N 83.79°E
- Country: Nepal
- Zone: Gandaki Zone
- District: Syangja District

Population (2011)
  - Total: 2,844
- Time zone: UTC+5:45 (Nepal Time)

Chhangchhangdi (छाङ्गछाङ्ग्दि) is a village development committee in Syangja District in the Gandaki Zone of central Nepal. At the time of the 2011 Nepal census it had a population of 2844 people living in 652 individual households.

Chhangchhangdi got its name from Magar language. (Changchang=sound produced by water; di=Water).

== Puranic History ==
The temple holds great religious significance for Hindus. Every year, thousands of devotees from various places visit the site on different religious occasions, particularly on Maha Shivaratri and Thulo Ekadashi, to worship Lord Shiva and pay their respects at this sacred place.
