= Malengkot =

Malyangkot मल्यांकोट
- Village development committee
- Location in Nepal Malyangkot (Nepal)
- Coordinates: 27.9460°N 83.8526°E
- Country: Nepal
- Zone: Gandaki Zone
- District: Syangja District

Population (2011)
  - Total: 4,684
- Time zone: UTC+5:45 (Nepal Time)

Malyangkot is a village development committee in Syangja District in the Gandaki Zone of central Nepal. At the time of the 2011 Nepal census it had a population of 4684 people living in 1102 individual households.
