= Yaladi =

Eladi एलादी यूली
- Waling Municipality Ward No. 4
- Nickname: Yuli
- Location in Nepal Eladi (Nepal)
- Coordinates: 27.99°N 83.84°E
- Nepal: Nepal
- Gandaki Province: Gandaki Zone
- District: Syangja District

Population (2011)
  - Total: 1,765
- Time zone: UTC+5:45 (Nepal Time)

Eladi is a former village development committee later merged with Waling Municipality in 2017, located in Syangja District, Gandaki Province of Western Nepal. At the time of the 2011 Nepal census it had a population of 1765. It is now recognized as ward no 4 of Waling Municipality. Gurung, Brahmin, Chhetri, Magar, Kami, Damai are the major ethnicities residing in this area.
