= Sirsekot =

Sirsekot सिर्सेकोट
- Village development committee
- Location in Nepal Sirsekot (Nepal)
- Coordinates: 28.00°N 83.69°E
- Country: Nepal
- Zone: Gandaki Zone
- District: Syangja District

Population (2011)
  - Total: 3,581
- Time zone: UTC+5:45 (Nepal Time)

Sirsekot is a village development committee in Syangja District in the Gandaki Zone of central Nepal. At the time of the 2011 Nepal census it had a population of 3581 people living in 792 individual households.
