= Setidobhan =

Setidobhan सेतीदोभान
- Village development committee
- Location in Nepal Setidobhan (Nepal)
- Coordinates: 28.16°N 83.83°E
- Country: Nepal
- Zone: Gandaki Zone
- District: Syangja District

Population (2011)
  - Total: 3,098
- Time zone: UTC+5:45 (Nepal Time)

Setidobhan (Nepali: सेतीदोभान) is a village development committee in Syangja District in the Gandaki Zone of central Nepal. At the time of the 2011 Nepal census it had a population of 3098. The major centers within the VDC are Setidobhan, Rangethanti, Newabot, Krishi and Jugle. The VDC comprises total 10 wards.
