= Ratnapur, Syangja =

Ratnapur, Gandaki रत्नपुर
- Location in Nepal Ratnapur, Gandaki (Nepal)
- Coordinates: 27.90°N 83.85°E
- Country: Nepal
- Zone: Gandaki Zone
- District: Syangja District

Population (1991)
  - Total: 3,194
- Time zone: UTC+5:45 (Nepal Time)

Ratnapur, Gandaki is a Market center in Chapakot Municipality in Syangja District in the Gandaki Zone of central Nepal. At the time of the 1991 Nepal census it had a population of 3194 people living in 608 individual households.
