= Oraste =

Oraste ओरष्टे
- Village development committee
- Location in Nepal Oraste (Nepal)
- Coordinates: 28.05°N 83.92°E
- Country: Nepal
- Zone: Gandaki Zone
- District: Syangja District

Population (2011)
  - Total: 3,515
- Time zone: UTC+5:45 (Nepal Time)

Oraste is a village development committee in Syangja District in the Gandaki Zone of western Nepal. At the time of the 2011 Nepal census it had a population of 3515 people living in 835 individual households.
