= Biruwa Archale =

Biruwa Himal Archale विरुवा अर्चले
- Village development committee
- Location in Nepal Biruwa Himal Archale (Nepal)
- Coordinates: 27.95°N 83.56°E
- Country: Nepal
- Zone: Gandaki Zone
- District: Syangja District

Population (2011)
  - Total: 2,860
- Time zone: UTC+5:45 (Nepal Time)

Biruwa Archale is a village development committee in Syangja District in the Gandaki Zone of central Nepal. At the time of the 2011 Nepal census it had a population of 2860 people living in 674 individual households. Ward no. 1 Dara/Besardada village is a 100% Gurung Village. While the other Ward No. 2 Shree Danda and the remaining Ward No. 3-9 consists of Magar, Chhetri and Brahmins.
