= Tindobate =

Tindobate तीनदोबाटे
- Village development committee
- Location in Nepal Tindobate (Nepal)
- Coordinates: 27.96°N 83.73°E
- Country: Nepal
- Zone: Gandaki Zone
- District: Syangja District

Government

Population (2011)
  - Total: 4,596
- Time zone: UTC+5:45 (Nepal Time)

Tindobate is a village development committee in Syangja District in the Gandaki Zone of central Nepal. 9 km of the Siddartha Highway lies in this VDC. Karadi and Bayatatri are two small town of Tindobate on the Siddhartha Highway. At the time of the 2011 Nepal census it had a population of 4596 people living in 994 individual households.
