= Bichari Chautara =

Coordinates: 28°11′N 83°46′E

Bichari Chautara बिचारी चौतारा
- Village development committee
- Location in Nepal Bichari Chautara (Nepal)
- Country: Nepal
- Zone: Gandaki Zone
- District: Syangja District

Population (2011)
  - Total: 2,185
- Time zone: UTC+5:45 (Nepal Time)

Bichari Chautara is a village development committee in Syangja District in the Gandaki Zone of central Nepal. At the time of the 2011 Nepal census it had a population of 2185 people living in 563 individual households.
