= Jagatradevi =

Jagatradevi जागत्रादेवी
- Village development committee
- Location in Nepal Jagatradevi (Nepal)
- Coordinates: 27.94°N 83.65°E
- Country: Nepal
- Zone: Gandaki Zone
- District: Syangja District

Population (2011)
  - Total: 8,700
- Time zone: UTC+5:45 (Nepal Time)

Jagatradevi is a village development committee in Syangja District in the Gandaki Zone of central Nepal. At the time of the 2011 Nepal census it had a population of 8700 people living in 2050 individual households.
