= Banethok Deurali =

Banethok Deurali बनेथोक देउराली
- Village development committee
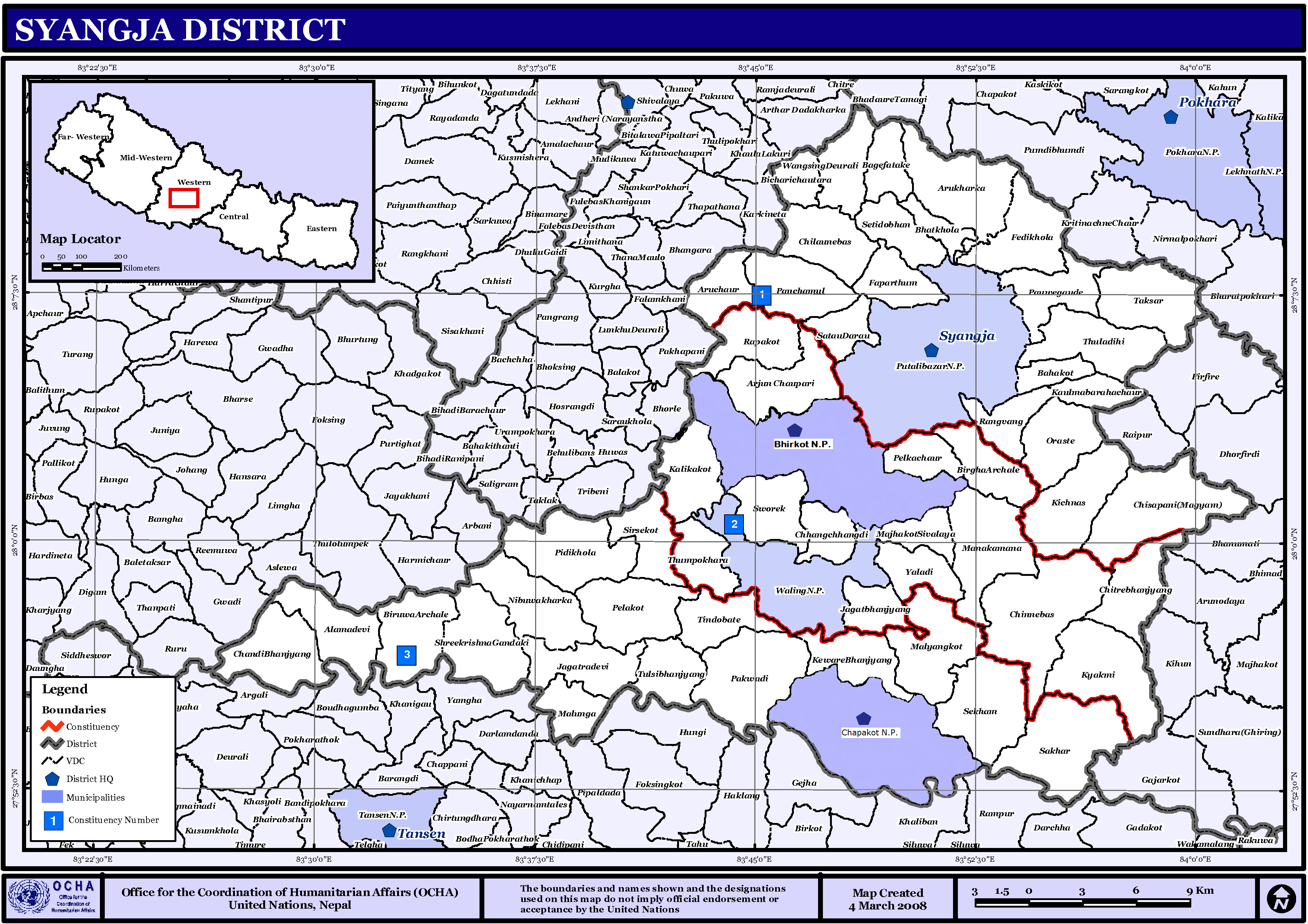

- Location in Nepal Banethok Deurali (Nepal)
- Coordinates: 28.026705°N 83.831392°E
- Country: Nepal
- Zone: Gandaki Zone
- District: Syangja District

Population (2011)
  - Total: 3,546
- Time zone: UTC+5:45 (Nepal Time)

Banethok Deurali is a village development committee (VDC) in Syangja District in the Gandaki Zone of central Nepal. At the time of the 2011 Nepal census it had a population of 3,546 people living in 864 individual households. The VDC is situated eight miles from district headquarters Syangja Bazaar. Siddhartha National Highway is the closest national highway to this VDC. With nearly 95% literate population, this VDC has one higher secondary school, one lower secondary school, four primary schools and one English medium school.
