= Darsing Dahathum =

Darsing Dahathum दारसिङ दहथुम
- Village development committee
- Location in Nepal Darsing Dahathum (Nepal)
- Coordinates: 28.03°N 83.80°E
- Country: Nepal
- Zone: Gandaki Zone
- District: Syangja District

Population (2011)
  - Total: 6,598
- Time zone: UTC+5:45 (Nepal Time)

Darsing Dahathum was a village development committee in Syangja District in the Gandaki Zone of central Nepal. At the time of the 2011 Nepal census it had a population of 6598 people living in 1671 individual households. Bayarghari Bazaar is the common market of this village development committee (VDC). The small bazaar Bayarghari is one of the fastest growing bazaars of Syangja District. Most of the people living in this VDC are in the Indian Army. The national highway Siddhartha Highway passes through this VDC. There are several government schools as well as four private schools. The main government school is Dahathum Higher Secondary School which is near Bayarghari.
