= Daraun =

Daraun दरौं
- Village development committee
- Country: Nepal
- Province: Gandaki Province
- District: Syangja District

Population (2011)
  - Total: 2,286
- Time zone: UTC+5:45 (Nepal Time)
- Area code: 063

Daraun is a village development committee in Syangja District in Gandaki Province of central Nepal. At the time of the 2011 Nepal census it had a population of 2286 people living in 582 individual households. Daraun is located at western part of the district. This VDC is joined with Arjun Chaupari VDC, Putalibazar municipality and Panchamul VDC.

In Daraun VDC there are nine different caste, they are presented according to Nepal census 2011

Caste/Ethnicity	Total	Male	Female
Chhetree	491	196	295
Brahman - Hill	879	374	505
Gharti/Bhujel	119	63	56
Gurung	57	23	34
Magar	64	22	42
Damai/Dholi	91	37	54
Sarki	248	96	152
Sanyasi/Dashnami	12	4	8
Kami	309	137	172
Others	16	6	10
total	2286	958	1328
