= Pelakot =

Pelakot पेलाकोट
- Village development committee
- Location in Nepal Pelakot (Nepal)
- Coordinates: 27.97°N 83.68°E
- Country: Nepal
- Zone: Gandaki Zone
- District: Syangja District

Population (2011)
  - Total: 5,748
- Time zone: UTC+5:45 (Nepal Time)

Pelakot is a village development committee in Syangja District in the Gandaki Zone of central Nepal. At the time of the 2011 Nepal census it had a population of 5748 people living in 1220 individual households.
