= Chilaunebas =

Chilaunebas चिलाउनेबास
- Village development committee
- Location in Nepal Chilaunebas (Nepal)
- Coordinates: 28.15°N 83.79°E
- Country: Nepal
- Zone: Gandaki Zone
- District: Syangja District

Population (2011)
  - Total: 2,722
- Time zone: UTC+5:45 (Nepal Time)

Chilaunebas is a village development committee in Syangja District in the Gandaki Zone of central Nepal. At the time of the 2011 Nepal census it had a population of 2722 people living in 662 individual households.
