= Pakwadi =

Pakwadi पकवादी
- Village development committee
- Location in Nepal Pakwadi (Nepal)
- Coordinates: 27.57°N 83.46°E
- Country: Nepal
- Zone: Gandaki Zone
- District: Syangja District

Population (2011)
  - Total: 5,958
- Time zone: UTC+5:45 (Nepal Time)

Pakwadi is a village development committee in Syangja District in the Gandaki Zone of central Nepal. At the time of the 2011 Nepal census it had a population of 5958 people living in 1284 individual households.
