= Nibuwakharka =

Nibuwakharka निबुवाखर्क
- Village development committee
- Location in Nepal Nibuwakharka (Nepal)
- Coordinates: 27.97°N 83.63°E
- Country: Nepal
- Zone: Gandaki Zone
- District: Syangja District

Population (2011)
  - Total: 3,875
- Time zone: UTC+5:45 (Nepal Time)

Nibuwakharka is a village development committee in Syangja District, Gandaki Zone, Nepal. At the time of the 2011 Nepal census it had a population of 3,875 living in 790 individual households. There are major 9 ward no/villages in this VDC. Magar and Bramhin are the major castes living in this village.
