= Chimnebas =

Coordinates: 27.9656°N 83.9003°E

Chinnebas चिन्नेबास
- Village development committee
- Location in Nepal Chinnebas (Nepal)
- Country: Nepal
- Zone: Gandaki Zone
- District: Syangja District

Population (2011)
  - Total: 4,753
- Time zone: UTC+5:45 (Nepal Time)

Chinnebas is a village development committee in Syangja District in the Gandaki Zone of central Nepal. At the time of the 2011 Nepal census it had a population of 4,753 people living in 1,059 individual households.
