= Rapakot =

Rapakot रापाकोट
- Village development committee
- Location in Nepal Rapakot (Nepal)
- Coordinates: 28.10°N 83.75°E
- Country: Nepal
- Zone: Gandaki Zone
- District: Syangja District

Population (2011)
  - Total: 3,827
- Time zone: UTC+5:45 (Nepal Time)

Rapakot is a village development committee in Syangja District in the Gandaki Zone of central Nepal. At the time of the 2011 Nepal census it had a population of 3827 people living in 904 individual households. There is a very famous Kalika temple.
