= Pelkachaur =

Pelkachaur पेल्काचौर
- Village development committee
- Location in Nepal Pelkachaur (Nepal)
- Coordinates: 28.04°N 83.84°E
- Country: Nepal
- Zone: Gandaki Zone
- District: Syangja District

Population (2011)
  - Total: 1,856
- Time zone: UTC+5:45 (Nepal Time)

Pelkachaur is a village development committee in Syangja District in the Gandaki Zone of central Nepal. At the time of the 1991 Nepal census it had a population of 1856 people living in 439 individual households.
