= Chandi Bhanjyang, Syangja =

Chandi Bhanjyang चण्डी भञ्ज्याङ
- Village development committee
- Location in Nepal Chandi Bhanjyang (Nepal)
- Coordinates: 27.95°N 83.48°E
- Country: Nepal
- Zone: Gandaki Zone
- District: Syangja District

Population (2011)
  - Total: 3,942
- Time zone: UTC+5:45 (Nepal Time)

Chandi Bhanjyang is a village development committee in Syangja District in the Gandaki Zone of central Nepal. At the time of the 2011 Nepal census it had a population of 3942 people living in 891 individual households. It is well known for its bullfighting events which are held twice every summer
