= Khilung Deurali =

Coordinates: 28°3′N 83°47′E

Khilung Deurali खिलुङ देउराली
- Village development committee
- Location in Nepal Khilung Deurali (Nepal)
- Country: Nepal
- Zone: Gandaki Zone
- District: Syangja District

Population (2011)
  - Total: 4,324
- Time zone: UTC+5:45 (Nepal Time)

Khilung Deurali is a village development committee in Syangja District in the Gandaki Zone of central Nepal. At the time of the 2011 Nepal census it had a population of 4324 people living in 1050 individual households.
