= Chitre Bhanjyang =

Coordinates: 28°0′N 83°59′E

Chitre Bhanjyang चित्रे भञ्ज्याङ
- Village development committee
- Location in Nepal Chitre Bhanjyang (Nepal)
- Country: Nepal
- Zone: Gandaki Zone
- District: Syangja District

Population (2011)
  - Total: 3,551
- Time zone: UTC+5:45 (Nepal Time)

Chitre Bhanjyang is a village development committee in Syangja District, in the Gandaki Zone of central Nepal. At the time of the 2011 Nepal census, it had a population of 3551 people living in 813 individual households.
