= Wangsing Deurali =

Wangsing Deurali वाङसिङ देउराली
- Village development committee
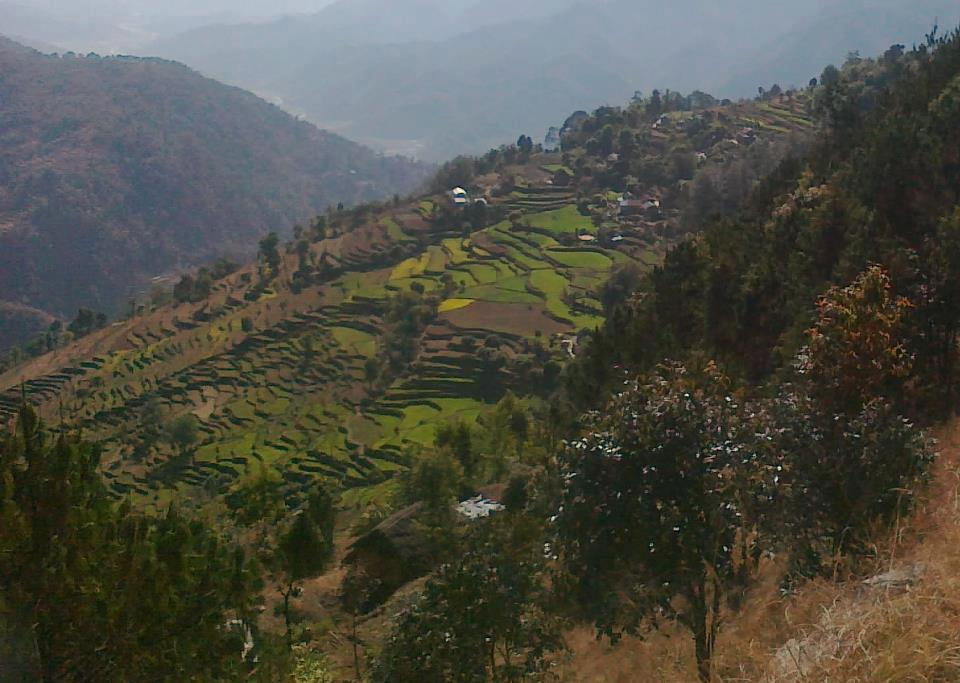

- Location in Nepal Wangsing Deurali (Nepal)
- Coordinates: 28.19°N 83.79°E
- Country: Nepal
- Zone: Gandaki Zone
- District: Syangja District

Population (2011)
  - Total: 2,374
- Time zone: UTC+5:45 (Nepal Time)
- Postal code: 33807

Wangsing Deurali is a village development committee in Syangja District in the Gandaki Zone of central Nepal. At the time of the 2011 Nepal census it had a population of 2374 people living in 624 individual households.
