= Alamdevi =

Place in Nepal

Alamdevi आलमदेवी
- Village development committee
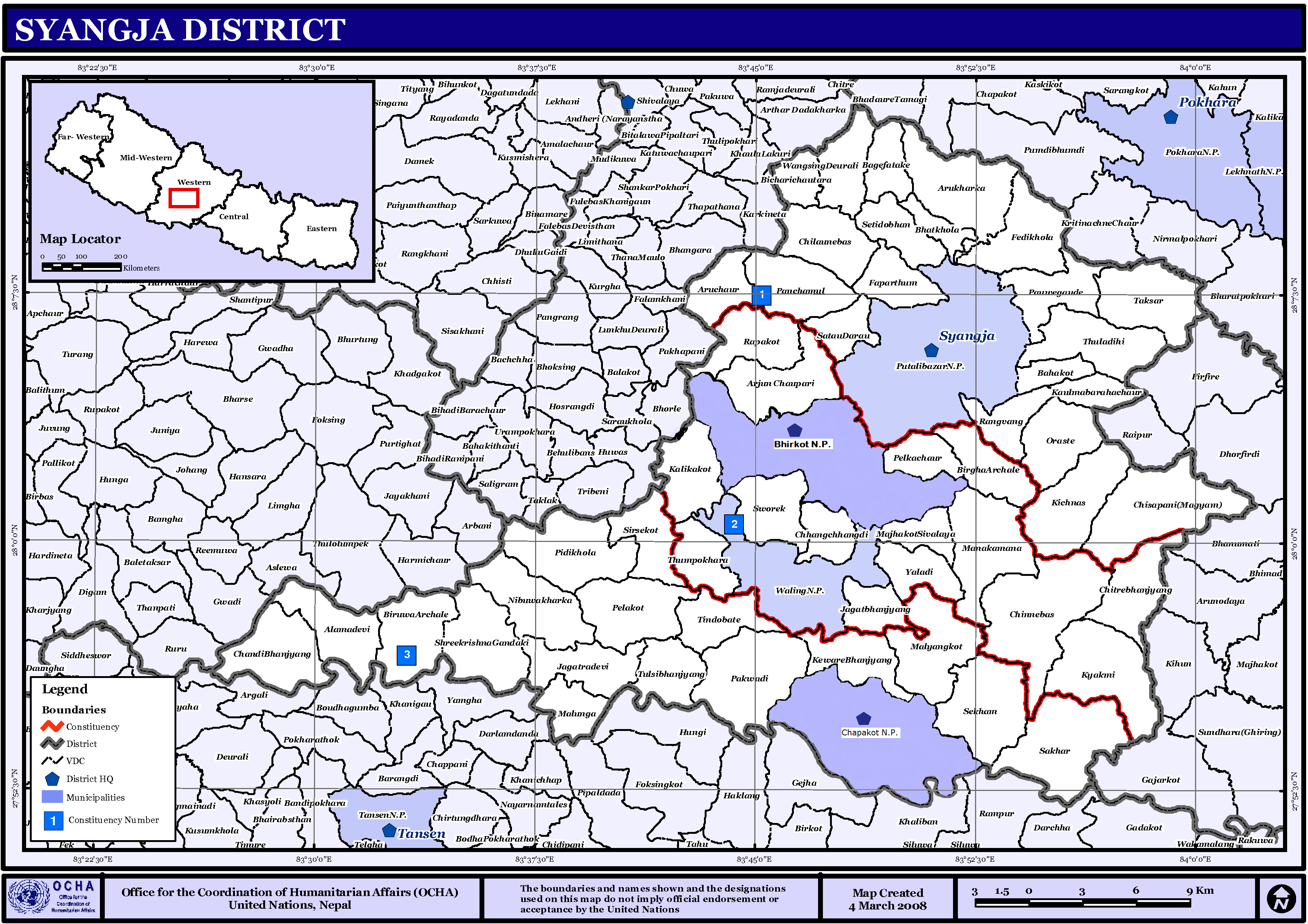

- Location in Nepal Alamdevi (Nepal)
- Coordinates: 27.953728°N 83.512351°E
- Country: Nepal
- Zone: Gandaki Zone
- District: Syangja District

Population (2011)
  - Total: 3,844
- Time zone: UTC+5:45 (Nepal Time)

Alamdevi is a village development committee in Syangja District in the Gandaki Zone of central Nepal. At the time of the 2011 Nepal census it had a population of 3844 people living in 908 individual households. Alamdevi Temple appeared on the national stamps in 2019.
