= Keware Bhanjyang =

Keware Bhanjyang केवरे भञ्ज्याङ
- Village development committee
- Location in Nepal Keware Bhanjyang (Nepal)
- Coordinates: 27.94°N 83.81°E
- Country: Nepal
- Zone: Gandaki Zone
- District: Syangja District

Population (2011)
  - Total: 2,902
- Time zone: UTC+5:45 (Nepal Time)

Keware Bhanjyang is a village development committee in Syangja District in the Gandaki Zone of central Nepal. At the time of the 2011 Nepal census it had a population of 2902 people living in 684 individual households.
