= Rangvang =

Rangvang राङवाङ
- Village development committee
- Location in Nepal Rangvang (Nepal)
- Coordinates: 28.06°N 83.89°E
- Country: Nepal
- Zone: Gandaki Zone
- District: Syangja District

Population (2011)
  - Total: 2,875
- Time zone: UTC+5:45 (Nepal Time)

Rangvang is a village development committee in Syangja District in the Gandaki Zone of central Nepal. At the time of the 2011 Nepal census it had a population of 2875 people living in 687 individual households.
