= Tulsibhanjyang =

Tulsibhanjyang तुलसीभञ्ज्याङ
- Village development committee
- Location in Nepal Tulsibhanjyang (Nepal)
- Coordinates: 27.94°N 83.70°E
- Country: Nepal
- Zone: Gandaki Zone
- District: Syangja District

Population (2011)
  - Total: 4,439
- Time zone: UTC+5:45 (Nepal Time)

Tulsibhanjyang is a village development committee in Syangja District in the Gandaki Zone of central Nepal. At the time of the 2011 Nepal census it had a population of 4439 people living in 961 individual households.
