= Dhapuk Simal Bhanjyang =

Coordinates: 28°3′0″N 83°44′0″E

Dhapuk Simal Bhanjyang धपुक सिमल भञ्ज्याङ
- Village development committee
- Location in Nepal Dhapuk Simal Bhanjyang (Nepal)
- Country: Nepal
- Zone: Gandaki Zone
- District: Syangja District

Population (2011)
  - Total: 3,666
- Time zone: UTC+5:45 (Nepal Time)

Dhapuk Simal Bhanjyang is a village development committee in Syangja District in the Gandaki Zone of central Nepal. At the time of the 1991 Nepal census it had a population of 3666 people living in 835 individual households.
