= Birgha Archale =

Birgha Archale बिर्घा अर्चले
- Village development committee
- Location within Gandaki Province Location within Nepal
- Coordinates: 27°57′37″N 83°32′30″E
- Country: Nepal
- Zone: Gandaki Zone
- District: Syangja District

Population (2011)
  - Total: 5,117
- Time zone: UTC+5:45 (Nepal Time)

Birgha Archale is a village development committee in Syangja District in the Gandaki Zone of central Nepal. At the time of the 2011 Nepal census it had a population of 5117 people living in 1180 individual households around the city. This village is situated in the west end district of Syangja. Two members of parliament are elected from the district's constituencies (Syangja 1 and Syangja 2).
