= Pindikhola =

Pindikhola पिंडीखोला
- Village development committee
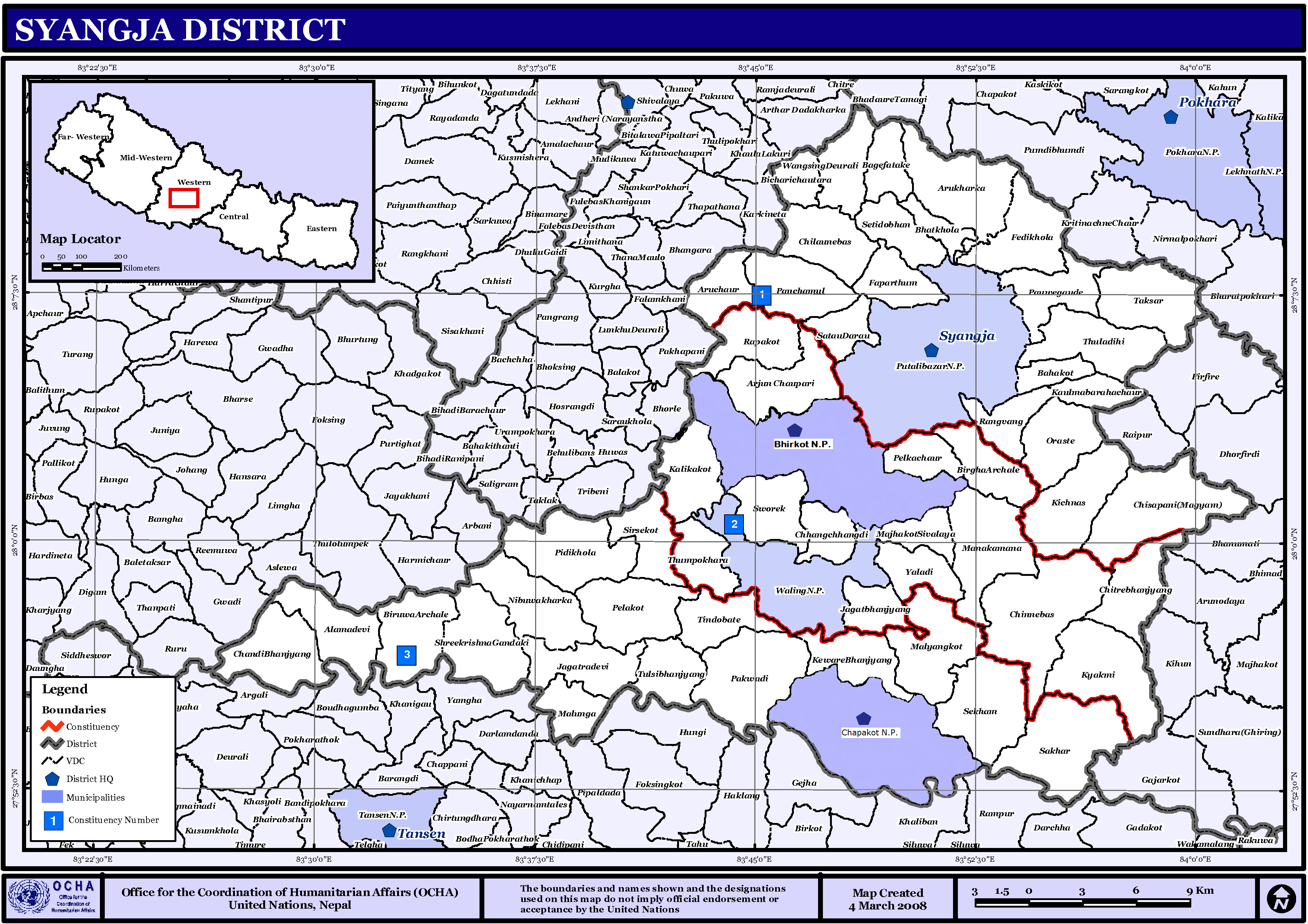

- Location in Nepal Pindikhola (Nepal)
- Coordinates: 28.00°N 83.65°E
- Country: Nepal
- Zone: Gandaki Zone
- District: Syangja District

Population (2011)
  - Total: 4,956
- Time zone: UTC+5:45 (Nepal Time)
- Area code: 063
- Website: http://pindikholaonline.blogspot.com/

Pindikhola was a village development committee in Syangja District in the Gandaki Zone of central Nepal. At the time of the 2011 Nepal census it had a population of 4,956 people living in 1,119 individual households.

== Profile ==
The study is mainly concentrated on Pindikhola VDC of Syangja district. Pindikhola VDC is one of the 60 VDCs of Syangja district, which is located 59 km ( 44 km from Putalibazar to Galyang and 15 km from Galyang to Chhabisebazar) far from district headquarters in western part of this district.

It is surrounded by Sirsekot VDC and some part of Pelakot VDC in the east, Niwuakharka VDC and some part of Pelakot VDC in the south, Kaligandaki river and some part Taklak and Shaligram VDC of the Parbat district in the west and Taklak, Triveni and Shaligram of the Parbat district in the North. Its altitude is about 700m to 2000m from the sea level. About 10% land is only plain which has been cultivated far from land and the rest land is sloppy with coverage of major human settlement, forest, shrub land, farming land, grazing land, small streams and so on.Total 18.45% area from the total area of Syangja district has covered by this VDC ( i.e. 19135 hector). Out of the total area of this VDC, 42.5% land has been covered by 2600 landowner for the purpose of housing, farming and grazing and followed by 19.5% of forest land. On the forest area, Sal, Katush Simal, Faledo, Jamuno, Fadiyar, Chiuri, Khalluk, Kadam, Dhairo, Sour, Chap, Siltemor etc. can be found.

So far the water resources is concerned, Pindikhola is major and permanent streams flows through the mid of the VDC. This stream starts from Chande choutari where two small streams i.e. Betiheni khola and Arfoudi khola of ward no. 1 and 2 meet and flows to end at Kaligandaki river at Setibeni. Several small streams of Pindikhola and Setikhola came from Parbat district also mix with this stream. This stream has been mainly tapped for irrigation and fishing. Almost all rice field situated on the plain area of this VDC has been irrigated from this stream. There are other 55 water resources including 83.63% permanent and 16.36% temporary sources, which have been utilized for source of drinking water. ( Pindikhola VDC profile 2058). Because some settlements such as Ranipokhari Majhgaun of ward no. 9, Bhalthum, Chitung, Padhera and Nigali of ward no. 4 and Bhanjyan of ward no. 6, are situated on higher altitude than location of source of water, drinking water has not been properly supplied there.

Climate of Pindikhola can not be assigned to any particular type because of the prevailing variation in altitude, topography and resulting temperature and precipitation. Mainly the features of subtropical, warm temperate and cool temperate zone meet in the VDC. On the basis of VDCs of Syangja with common climatic features, it can be mentioned in the case of Pindikhola also that temperature in this VDC varies between 9- 23 degree Celsius and rainfall average at 2665 ml.

== Demographic Profile ==
The total population of Pindikhola VDC is 5960 (i.e. 1.88% of total population of Syangja district), where the population of male and female is 2652 (44.49%) and 3308 (55.51%). The total number of household of this VDC is 1158 and average household size is 5.14.(Population Census, 2058 B.S.). This VDC contains a range of diverse and multi ethnic society. The VDC has 46.26% Brahmins which is followed by ethnic, Dalit and Chettri by 26.05%, 13.99%, and 13.54% respectively. The age structure of VDC is highly dominated by children and youth representing 29.71% (under 9 years age group) and 24.53% (10 to 19 year's age group) respectively. The economically active age group (i.e. 20 to 59 year's age group) represents 37.58% of the total population. The prevalent caste in the study area was Brahmin then followed by Ethnic, Chhetri and Dalit. The highest percentage (46.26%) of the population are Brahmin. Next to Brahmin are Magar (19.75%), Chhetri (11.73%) and Kami (7.79%), Gurung (5.67%) then Sarki (3.26%) and Dholi/Damai (2.95%). The total marital status of people above 10 years shows that 50.71% are married with single spouse and 1.64% with more than one spouse. About 4.01% are remarried population, 5.59% are widowed, 0.18% are separated. 36.97% population are not married. The study area has population with different religion, but the majority of population (95.20%) follow Hinduism and followed by Buddhism at 4.79%. The study area is also diverse from the point of view of languages spoken in the locality and by the mother tongue of different communities. Four fifth of the population (80.38%) speak Nepali, which is followed by Magar, Gurung, Newar by 13.32%, 5.38% and 0.30% respectively. Medium of communication between different set of people and community is Nepali. In terms of occupation, undoubtedly, the large faction of population depends upon agriculture for their livelihood. 94.67% household have their own land and other earn from rented land or field labour. Out of the total household, 50.17% household have their agricultural occupation depending upon farming land and livestock, 38.43% on farming land, livestock and poultry 0.34% have poultry and 0.34% have livestock respectively. Moreover, 14.33% household are involved in non agricultural economic activities also, out of which, major households (56.62%) have occupation on service sector, 19.87% on trade/ Business sector and the rest on other different non agricultural economic activities.

== Local People's Access on Basic Services ==
After completion of 23 km motorable road (not for rainy season) from Galyang to Setibeni, people of this VDC can meet Siddhartha Highway within one and half hour. This road, which has crossed through the heart of the VDC have now connected to big market center Galyang on one side and with the religious center Setibeni on the other side. This road will extend huge development potentialities after linking this road with nearby another market center Mirmi and Waling- Hwas road. Now, motorable road has touched in ward of this VDC. According to policy of Government of Nepal to extend telephone services to each VDCs of Nepal, this VDC have also been benefited with access of phone services. Now, no ward is without access of telephone service in this VDC. In addition to this, the VDC has one additional post office at Dudebazar, one health post at Pandethok, four private pharmaceutical shop at Dude, Pandethok, Setibeni and Ranipohari. It has nine primary school (including seven schools up to class five and two schools up to three class), one secondary school and one higher secondary school. Health post and schools have well facility building with toilet and drinking water facility on their own premises. Higher Secondary school has facility of library as well as computer education facility from the current year. The average distance of primary schools with the student's home is 20 minutes and the average distance of health post from health post from the villager's home is 42 minutes. In spite of insufficient intervention from Non Government Organization (NGO) in this VDC, support on drinking water projects from Helvatas and Red Cross, School Building project from JICA, some agricultural farming trainings from SIMI Nepal is praiseworthy. From local initiative, mothers group and club have been formed and executed which has reached in number of sixteen. Locally, small market centres has been developed to provide access of different services and to make linkage with hinterland villages. Dudebazar, located at the center area of this VDC have functional access of purchasing/ selling goods, school, health, postal facility and administration of VDC. Another market center, Setibeni, though located at the west corner of the VDC, has carried also religious significance due to celebration of Mela on the special occasion of Ekadash, and Sankranti. The vital role of intermediaries have been realized to generate more economic potentiality by linking the hinterland villages (which can produce and provide local products) with local and urban market center (which can give market to the product produced by villagers).
