= Srikrishna Gandaki =

Srikrishna Gandaki श्रीकृष्ण गण्डकी
- Village development committee
- Location in Nepal Srikrishna Gandaki (Nepal)
- Coordinates: 27.95°N 83.60°E
- Country: Nepal
- Zone: Gandaki Zone
- District: Syangja District

Population (2011)
  - Total: 8,815
- Time zone: UTC+5:45 (Nepal Time)

Srikrishna Gandaki is a village development committee in Syangja District in the Gandaki Zone of central Nepal. At the time of the 2011 Nepal census it had a population of 8815 people living in 1993 individual households.
