= Aruchaur =

Aaruchour आरुचौर
- Village development committee
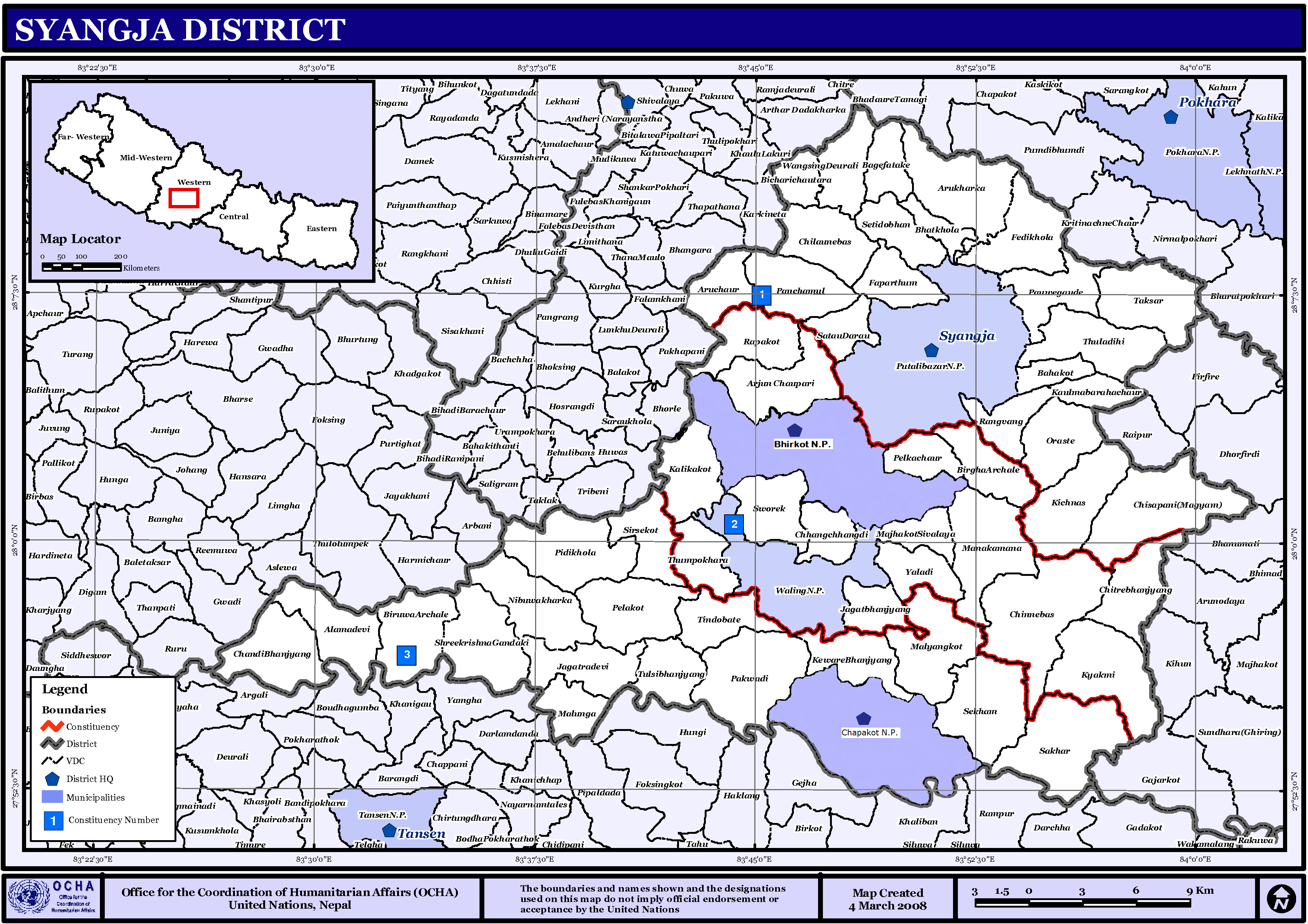
- Nickname: Arjunchaupari Rural Municipal ward number 5
- Location in Nepal Aaruchour (Nepal)
- Coordinates: 28.13°N 83.73°E
- Country: Syangja DistrictNepal
- Zone: Gandaki Zone
- District: Syangja District

Population (2011)
  - Total: 2,956
- Time zone: UTC+5:45 (Nepal Time)
- Postal code: 33805

Aaruchour is a former Village Development Committee in Syangja District Nepal. At the time of the 1991 Nepal census, it had a population of 2,956 people living in 760 individual households. Aaruchour is a village development committee in Syangja district of Gandaki zone of Nepal. When the local bodies were restructured, it was changed from Aaruchour Village Development Committee and turned into Ward No. 4 and 5 of Arjunchaupari Village Municipality. Karkineta, Shirubari, Ghantebazar are near from here. Dahare Devi Temple is located at a very high altitude and can be seen far and wide from here. In Talpokhari School, studies are conducted up to class 12. Buses run there from Chitwan and Pokhara. Mulpani road passing Carcineta and another Pakhapani, The road reaches Aaruch
