= Arukharka =

Arukharka आरुखर्क
- Village development committee
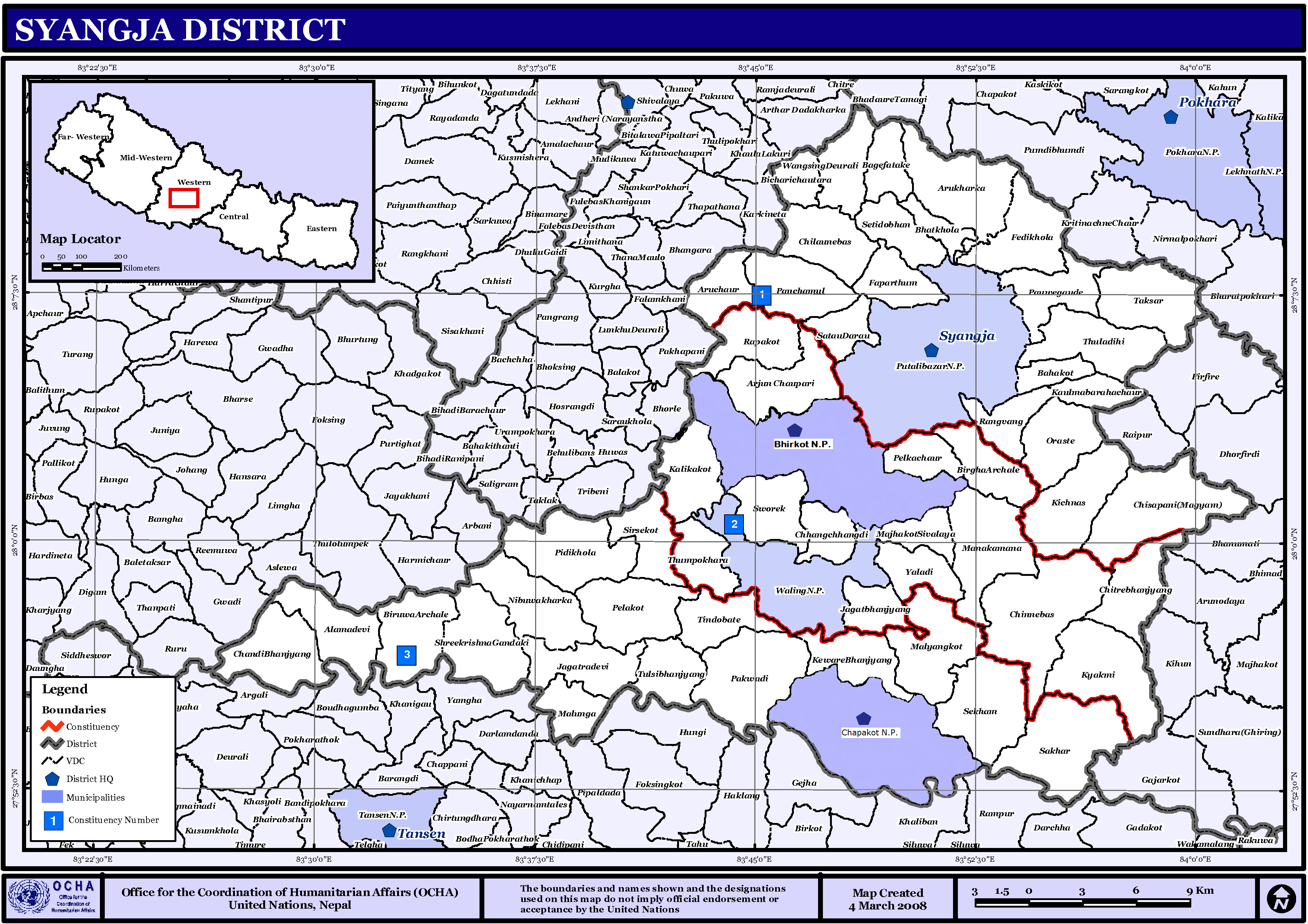

- Location in Nepal Arukharka (Nepal)
- Coordinates: 28.18°N 83.87°E
- Country: Nepal
- Zone: Gandaki Zone
- District: Syangja District

Population (2011)
  - Total: 3,397
- Time zone: UTC+5:45 (Nepal Time)

Arukharka is a village development committee in Syangja District in the Gandaki Zone of central Nepal. At the time of the 2011 Nepal census it had a population of 3,397 people living in 878 individual households. The VDC office is located at the sherbazzar which is the VDC center. This is approximately 4 km from Sarketari bazzar of Siddhartha Highway. This VDC consists of one Higher Secondary School Name as Jana Adarsa Higher Secondary School.
