= Chisapani, Syangja =

Coordinates: 28°0′N 83°58′E

Chisapani, Gandaki चिसापानी
- Village development committee
- Location in Nepal Chisapani, Gandaki (Nepal)
- Country: Nepal
- Zone: Gandaki Zone
- District: Syangja District

Population (2011)
  - Total: 4,281
- Time zone: UTC+5:45 (Nepal Time)

Chisapani, Gandaki is a village development committee in Syangja District in the Gandaki Zone of central Nepal. At the time of the 2011 Nepal census it had a population of 4281 people living in 953 individual households.
