= Bhatkhola =

Bhatkhola भाटखोला
- Village development committee
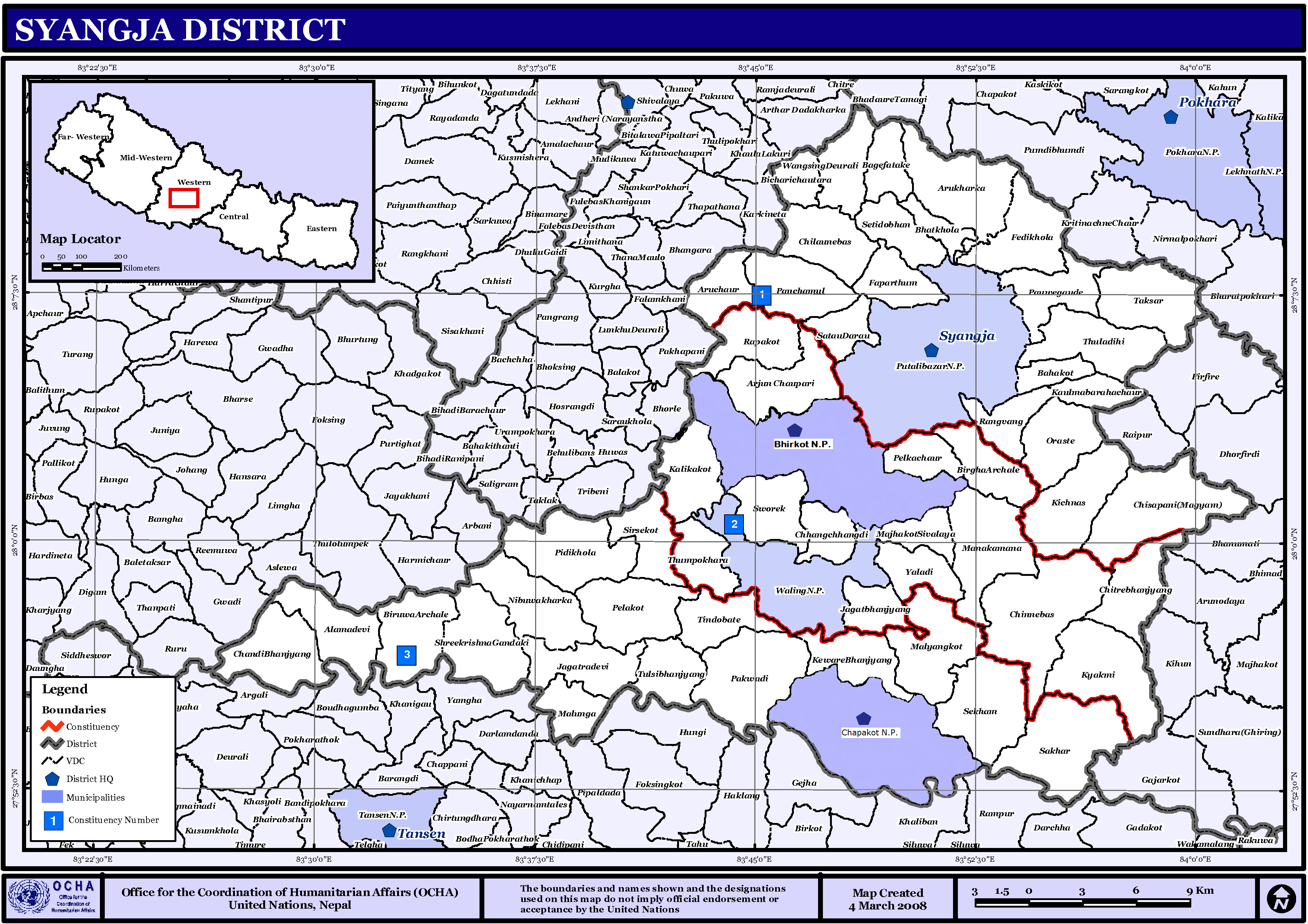

- Location in Nepal Bhatkhola (Nepal)
- Coordinates: 28.16°N 83.85°E
- Country: Nepal
- Zone: Gandaki Zone
- District: Syangja District

Population (2011)
  - Total: 1,659
- Household and Population by Sex
- Time zone: UTC+5:45 (Nepal Time)

Bhatkhola is a village development committee in Syangja District in the Gandaki Zone of central Nepal. At the time of the 2011 Nepal census it had a population of 1,659 people living in 450 individual households.
