= Panchamul =

Panchamul पञ्चमुल
- Village development committee
- Location in Nepal Panchamul (Nepal)
- Coordinates: 28.13°N 83.78°E
- Country: Nepal
- Zone: Gandaki Zone
- District: Syangja District

Population (2011)
  - Total: 4,601
- Time zone: UTC+5:45 (Nepal Time)

Panchamul is a village development committee in Syangja District in the Gandaki Zone of central Nepal. At the time of the 2011 Nepal census it had a population of 4601 people living in 1079 individual households.
