= Kichnas =

Kichnas किचनास
- Village development committee
- Location in Nepal Kichnas (Nepal)
- Coordinates: 28.02°N 83.93°E
- Country: Nepal
- Zone: Gandaki Zone
- District: Syangja District

Population (2011)
  - Total: 4,833
- Time zone: UTC+5:45 (Nepal Time)

Kichnas is a village development committee in Syangja District in the Gandaki Zone of central Nepal. At the time of the 2011 Nepal census it had a population of 4833 people living in 1153 individual households.
