= Syangja District =

District in Gandaki Pradesh, Nepal

Coordinates: 28°05′49″N 83°49′19″E

Syangja District स्याङ्जा
- District
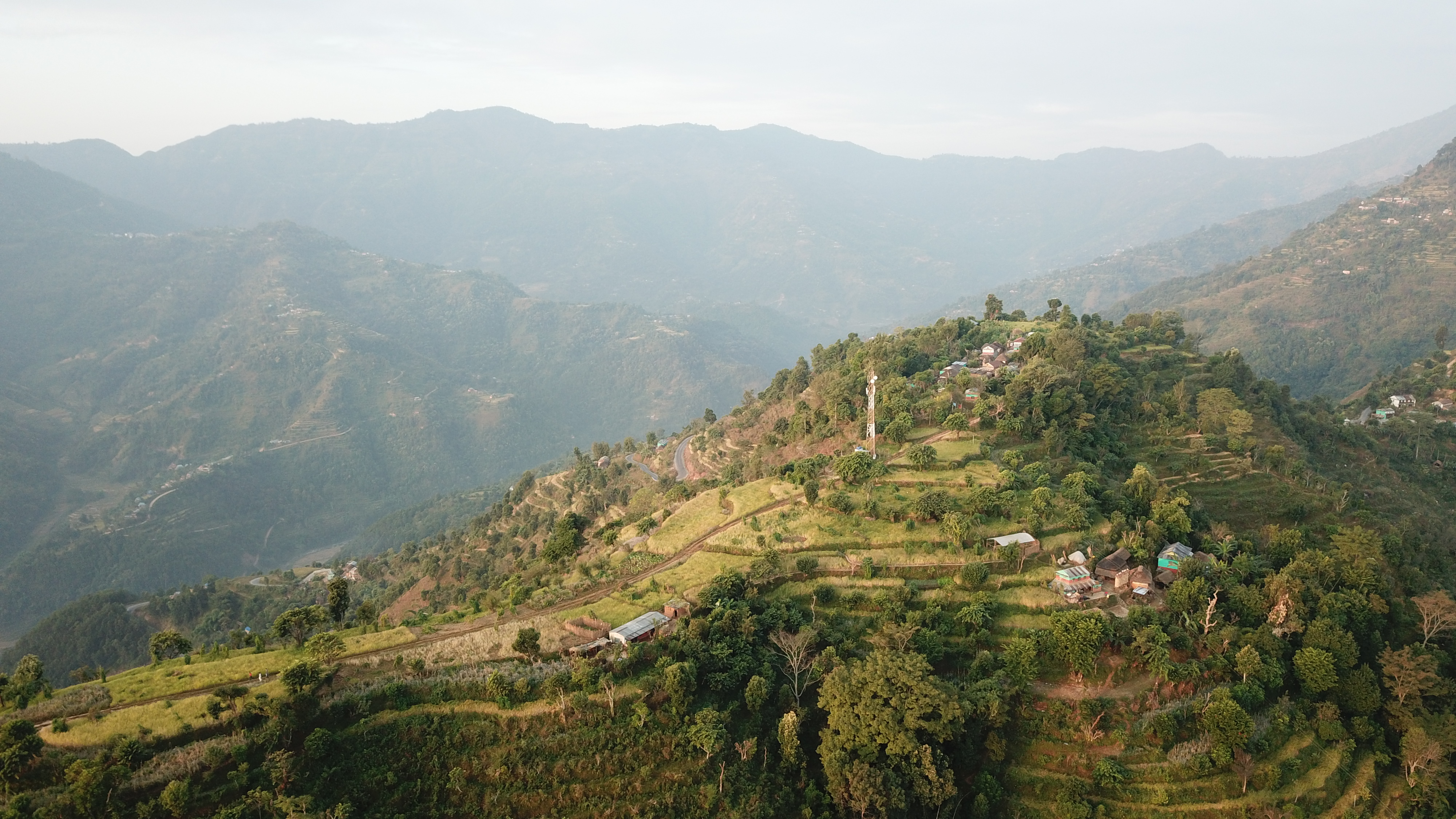
- Aerial view of a village

- Division of Syangja
- Interactive map of Syangja District
- Country: Nepal
- Province: Gandaki
- Capital: Putalibazar
- Largest City: Waling

Government
  - Type: Coordination committee
  - Body: DCC, Syangja

Area
  - Total: 1,164 km^{2} (449 sq mi)

Population (2021)
  - Total: 254,965
  - Density: 219.0/km^{2} (567.3/sq mi)
- Time zone: UTC+05:45 (NPT)
- Postal Codes: 33800
- Telephone Code: 063
- Main Language(s): Nepali, Magar, Gurung

Syangja District (Nepali: स्याङ्जा जिल्ला;) is a part of Gandaki Province, and is one of the seventy-seven districts of Nepal. Its headquarter is Putalibazar with a diverse population including Brahmin, Magars, Chhetri, Sunar, Biswakarma, Pariyar, Nepali, Sarki and Gurung communities. Syangja is home to attractions like the ancient temples of Garaunsur and Akala, scenic viewpoints such as Panchase, and the historical town of Waling, making it a growing eco-tourism destination. The economy is primarily based on agriculture, with rice, maize, millet, and fruits like oranges being widely cultivated. Syangja is the leading orange producer in Nepal with 22,000 tons in 2023. The district has several educational institutions, and many residents pursue higher education in cities like Pokhara and Kathmandu. Connected by highways to major cities like Pokhara and Butwal, the district covers an area of 1,164 km^{2} (449 sq mi) and has a population of 254,965.

== Etymology ==
The name "Syangja" is derived from the surname of the Sinjali people, an ethnic group belonging to the Magar community who live in this area. There are various folklore surrounding the name.

== History ==
=== Prehistoric Times ===
The area that is now Syangja District has been inhabited since ancient times, with archaeological evidence suggesting human settlement dating back thousands of years.

=== Medieval Period ===
During the medieval period, the region was part of various small principalities and kingdoms. It was ruled by local chieftains and feudal lords, often referred to as the Barha Magarat. These small kingdoms were primarily inhabited by the Magar ethnic group, one of the indigenous peoples of Nepal. The petty kingdoms of Bhirkot, Nuwakot and Satahun of Chaubisi Rajya existed in present day territory of Syangja.

=== Unification of Nepal ===
In the 18th century, the Shah Dynasty, led by King Prithvi Narayan Shah, began the unification of Nepal. Syangja, like many other regions, came under the rule of the expanding Gorkha Kingdom. The unification campaign led to the consolidation of various small principalities into a single kingdom, which eventually became modern Nepal.

=== Historical Places ===
The headquarters of Syangja District lies in Syangja Bazaar. Some places of historical interest in this district include Satahun Chandi, Manakamana, Bhirkot Durbar, Alamdevi, Akala Devi, Gahraukalika, Nuwakot Durbar, Chhangchhangdi, and Ridi Ruru Kshetra, located along the banks of the Kaligandaki River. Chhangchhangdi (Chaya-kshetra) is mentioned in the Swasthani Vrata-Katha, which is considered part of the Skanda Purana, as the place where the last organ of the deceased Satidevi fell while she was being carried by Lord Shiva.

Among the three municipalities, Putalibazar municipality is situated on the eastern side, while Waling municipality is located in western Syangja. The newly formed Chapakot municipality is in the east-south. Waling is a longitudinal valley along the banks of the Aandhikhola River. According to one folk legend, the Aandhikhola River is believed to have originated from the tears of Shravan from the Ramayana. The largest valley in Syangja is Ramkosh. There are hiking opportunities, including Chandithaan, which is a Devi temple, and Hunikot, a viewpoint overlooking Putalibazar.

== Geography ==
Syangja District lies in the hilly region, with altitudes ranging from approximately 300 meters along the banks of the Kaligandaki River to about 3520 metersPanchase above sea level. It is situated at a latitude of 28°4'60" North and a longitude of 83°52'0" East.

Climate Zone	Elevation range	% of Area
Upper Tropical	300 to 1,000 meters 1,000 to 3,300 ft.	53.6%
Subtropical	1,000 to 2,000 meters 3,300 to 6,600 ft.	45.3%

== Government and politics ==
Syangja District has 11 local units, among which five are municipalities (Nagarpalika) and six are rural municipalities (Gaunpalika) established with the formulation of the new constitution and the provincial division of the country.

Local Units in Syangja District
Type	Name	Headquarters	Population (2021)
Municipality	Waling Municipality	Waling	51,437
Municipality	Putalibazar Municipality	Putalibazar	45,510
Municipality	Galyang Municipality	Galyang	37,821
Municipality	Bhirkot Municipality	Bhirkot	25,584
Municipality	Chapakot Municipality	Chapakot	22,969
Rural Municipality	Kaligandaki Rural Municipality	Kaligandaki	17,955
Rural Municipality	Biruwa Rural Municipality	Biruwa	14,001
Rural Municipality	Arjun Chaupari Rural Municipality	Arjun Chaupari	14,045
Rural Municipality	Harinas Rural Municipality	Harinas	16,300
Rural Municipality	Phedikhola Rural Municipality	Phedikhola	10,899
Rural Municipality	Aandhikhola Rural Municipality	Aandhikhola	13,094
Syangja District			253,024

=== Former Village Development Committees and Municipalities ===
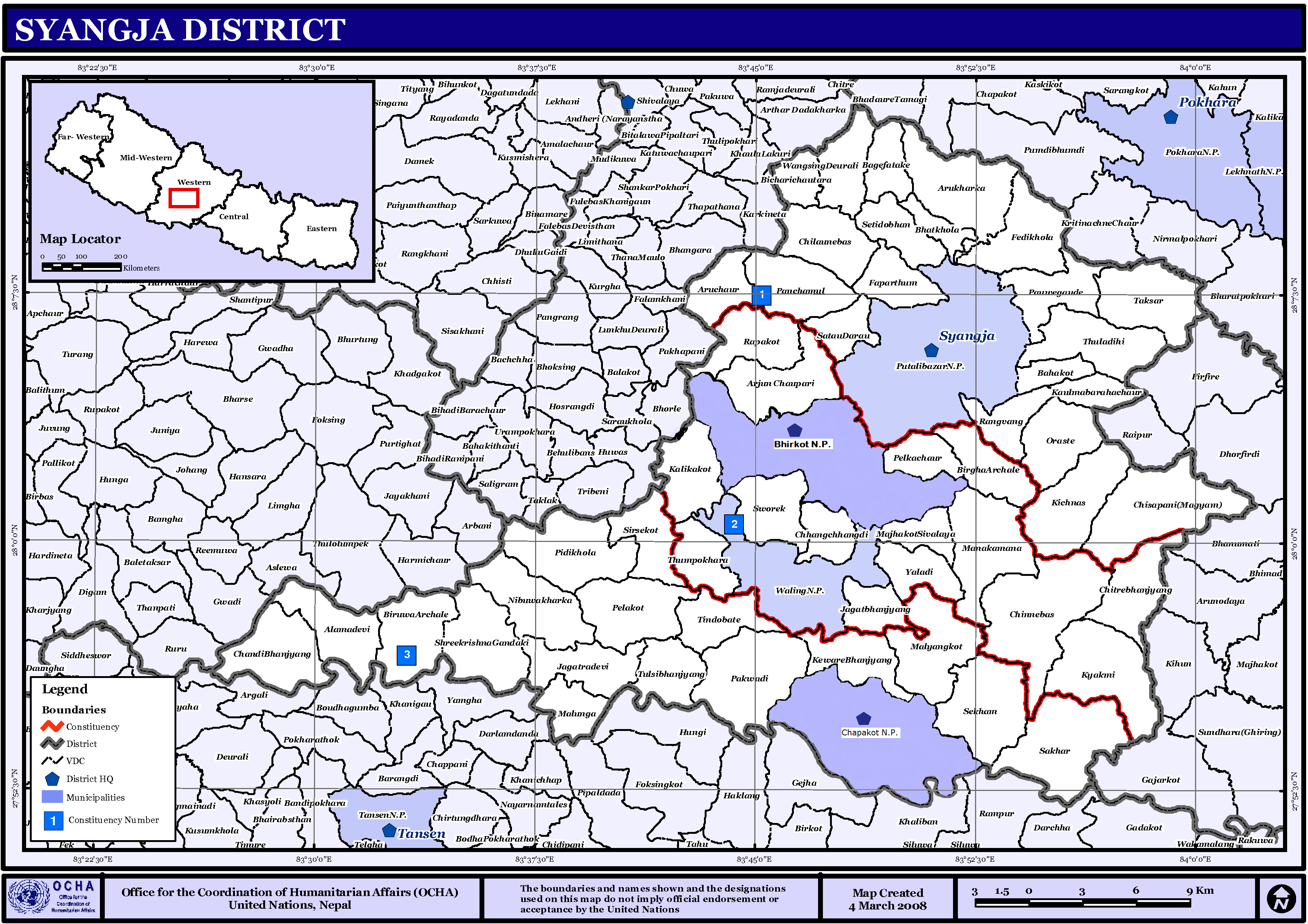
Map of the VDCs in Syangja District

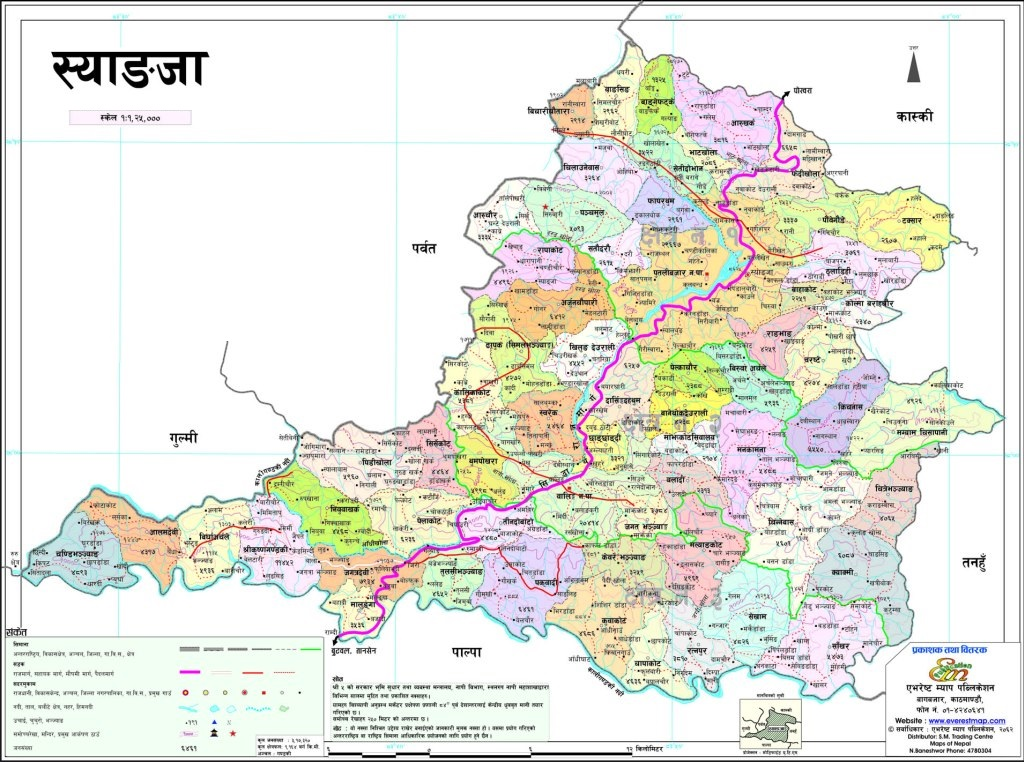
Syangja

Before the reorganization of administrative divisions, Syangja District was divided into several Village Development Committees (VDCs) and municipalities. The following table lists these VDCs and municipalities as they were prior to the restructuring. In total, there were 44 VDCs and 4 municipalities in Syangja District before the reorganization.

Former Village Development Committees (VDCs) and Municipalities in Syangja District
Category	Name
VDC	Alamdevi
VDC	Arjun Chaupari
VDC	Aruchaur
VDC	Arukharka
VDC	Bangephadke
VDC	Bahakot
VDC	Banethok Deurali
VDC	Bhatkhola
Municipality	Bhirkot Municipality
VDC	Bichari Chautara
VDC	Birgha Archale
VDC	Biruwa Archale
VDC	Chandi Bhanjyang
Municipality	Chapakot Municipality
VDC	Chhangchhangdi
VDC	Chilaunebas
VDC	Chinnebas
VDC	Chisapani
VDC	Chitre Bhanjyang
VDC	Darsing Dahathum
VDC	Dhapuk Simal Bhanjyang
VDC	Iladi
VDC	Jagat Bhanjyang
VDC	Jagatradevi
VDC	Kalikakot
VDC	Kolma Barahachaur
VDC	Keware Bhanjyang
VDC	Khilung Deurali
VDC	Kichnas
VDC	Kyakami
VDC	Majhakot Sivalaya
VDC	Malengkot
VDC	Malunga Tunibot
VDC	Manakamana
VDC	Nibuwakharka
VDC	Oraste
VDC	Pakbadi
VDC	Panchamul
VDC	Pauwegaude
VDC	Pelakot
VDC	Pelkachaur
VDC	Phaparthum
VDC	Phedikhola
VDC	Pindikhola
Municipality	Putalibazar Municipality
VDC	Rangvang
VDC	Rapakot
VDC	Ratnapur
VDC	Sankhar
VDC	Daraun
VDC	Sirsekot Kaule
VDC	Sekham
VDC	Setidobhan
VDC	Srikrishna Gandaki
VDC	Sirsekot
VDC	Sorek
VDC	Taksar
VDC	Thuladihi
VDC	Thumpokhara
VDC	Tindobate
VDC	Tulsibhanjyang
Municipality	Waling Municipality
VDC	Wangsing Deurali
VDC	Yaladi
Total VDCs	44
Total Municipalities	4

== Economy ==
Putalibazar is the headquarters of the district, but Waling is the financial capital of Syangja. Syangja district is known for orange cultivation, and it is the largest producer of oranges in Nepal. Orange cultivation is an important part of the local economy, serving as the main cash crop of the district and contributing significantly to the livelihood of its residents. Syangja is one of Nepal’s emerging districts for coffee production, with locally grown coffee being supplied to national and export markets. Remittances play a vital role in the district’s economy, as a substantial portion of the working-age population is employed abroad or in urban centers of Nepal. Small-scale trade, local markets, and cottage industries such as agro-processing, handicrafts, and traditional weaving support the non-agricultural sector.

Hydropower projects and improved road connectivity have gradually expanded economic opportunities, while tourism related to religious sites, trekking routes, and rural homestays is developing at a modest pace.

=== Transportation ===
Syangja is connected to Pokhara and Bhairahawa, two of the most prominent cities in Western Nepal, via the Siddhartha Highway. The highway enters this district from Kubhinde in the north and exits to Ramdi in Palpa District in the south.

=== Hydroelectricity ===
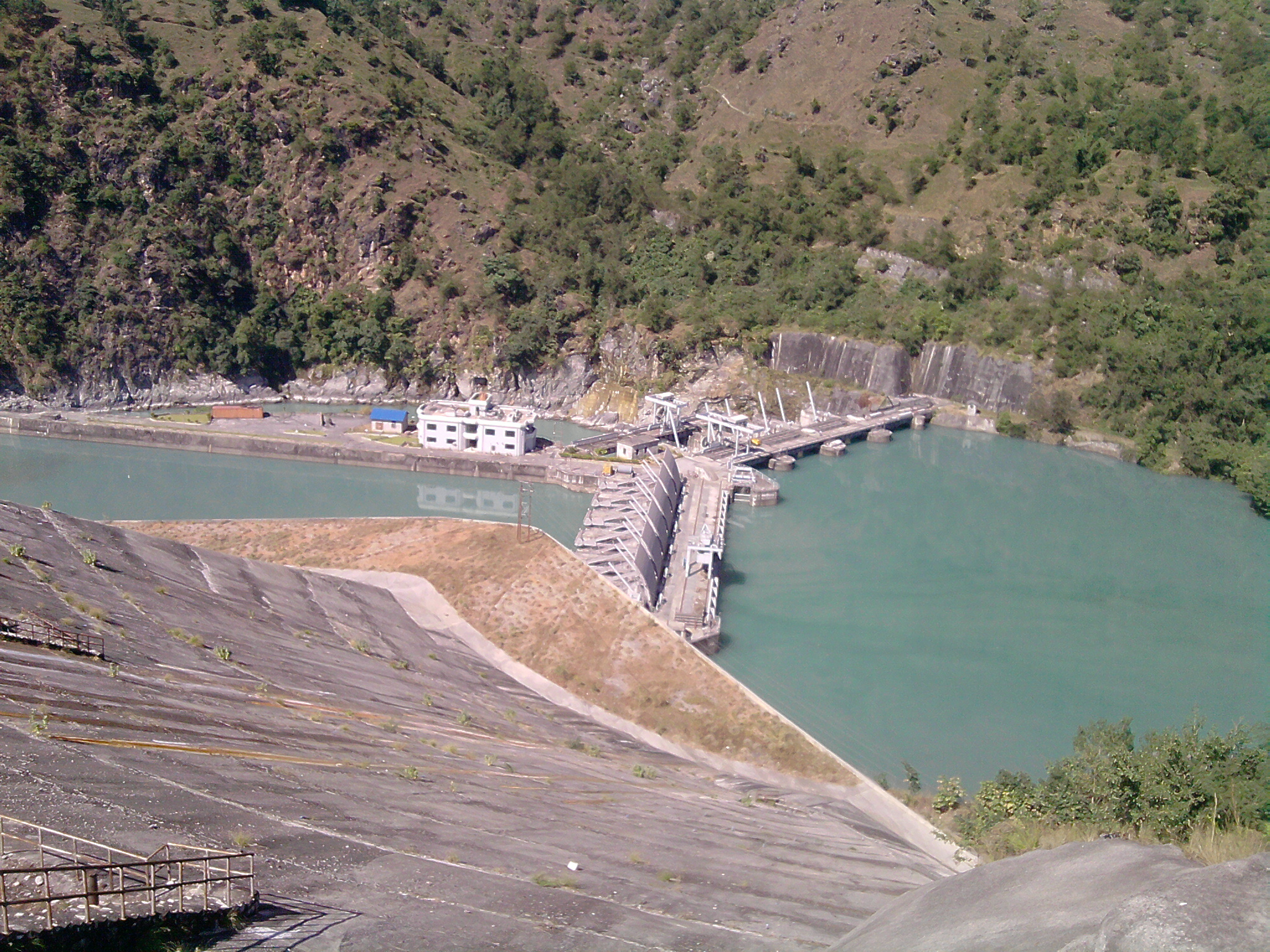
Kaligandaki A Hydroelectric Power Station, producing 144 MW.

The Kaligandaki A Hydroelectric Power Station built on the Kali Gandaki River is the largest hydroelectric project in Nepal, with an installed capacity of 144 MW. Besides the Kaligandaki A, Aadhikhola hydroelectric and some other, smaller, hydroelectric projects have been started in this district.

Of all the districts in Nepal, Syangja was one of the fewest districts in the country that does not suffer from the problem of loadshedding, or scheduled electric outages, while the nation suffered hours of loadshedding each day during peak of loadshedding era in Nepal.

== Demographics ==
Historical population
Census year	Pop.	±% p.a.
1981	271,824	—
1991	293,526	+0.77%
2001	317,320	+0.78%
2011	289,148	−0.93%
2021	254,965	−1.25%
Source: Citypopulation

At the time of the 2021 Nepal census, Syangja District had a population of 253,024. 6.58% of the population is under 5 years of age. It has a literacy rate of 81.67% and a sex ratio of 1169 females per 1000 males. 168,879 (66.74%) lived in municipalities.

Castes/ethnic groups in Syangja district (2021)
1. Bahun (28.1%)
2. Magar (22.0%)
3. Chhetri (11.9%)
4. Gurung (8.87%)
5. Kami (8.28%)
6. Sarki (4.69%)
7. Damai (4.09%)
8. Newar (3.42%)
9. Thakuri (2.68%)
10. Bhujel (2.25%)
11. Other Hill Janjati (1.79%)
12. Others (1.89%)

Khas people make up 60% of the population, of which Bahun and Chhetri are the largest groups. Khas Dalits are 17% of the population. Hill Janjatis are the second largest group, making up 35% of the population.

Languages of Baglung district (2021)
1. Nepali (74.7%)
2. Magar (15.4%)
3. Gurung (7.66%)
4. Nepal Bhasha (1.07%)
5. Others (1.16%)

At the time of the 2021 census, 74.72% of the population spoke Nepali, 15.39% Magar, 7.66% Gurung and 1.07% Nepal Bhasha as their first language. In 2011, 74.4% of the population spoke Nepali as their first language.

Religion in Syangja District (2021)
Religion	Percent
Hinduism	86.35%
Buddhism	7.92%
Bon	3.32%
Prakriti	1.16%
Islam	0.90%
Other or not stated	0.35%

== Culture and society ==
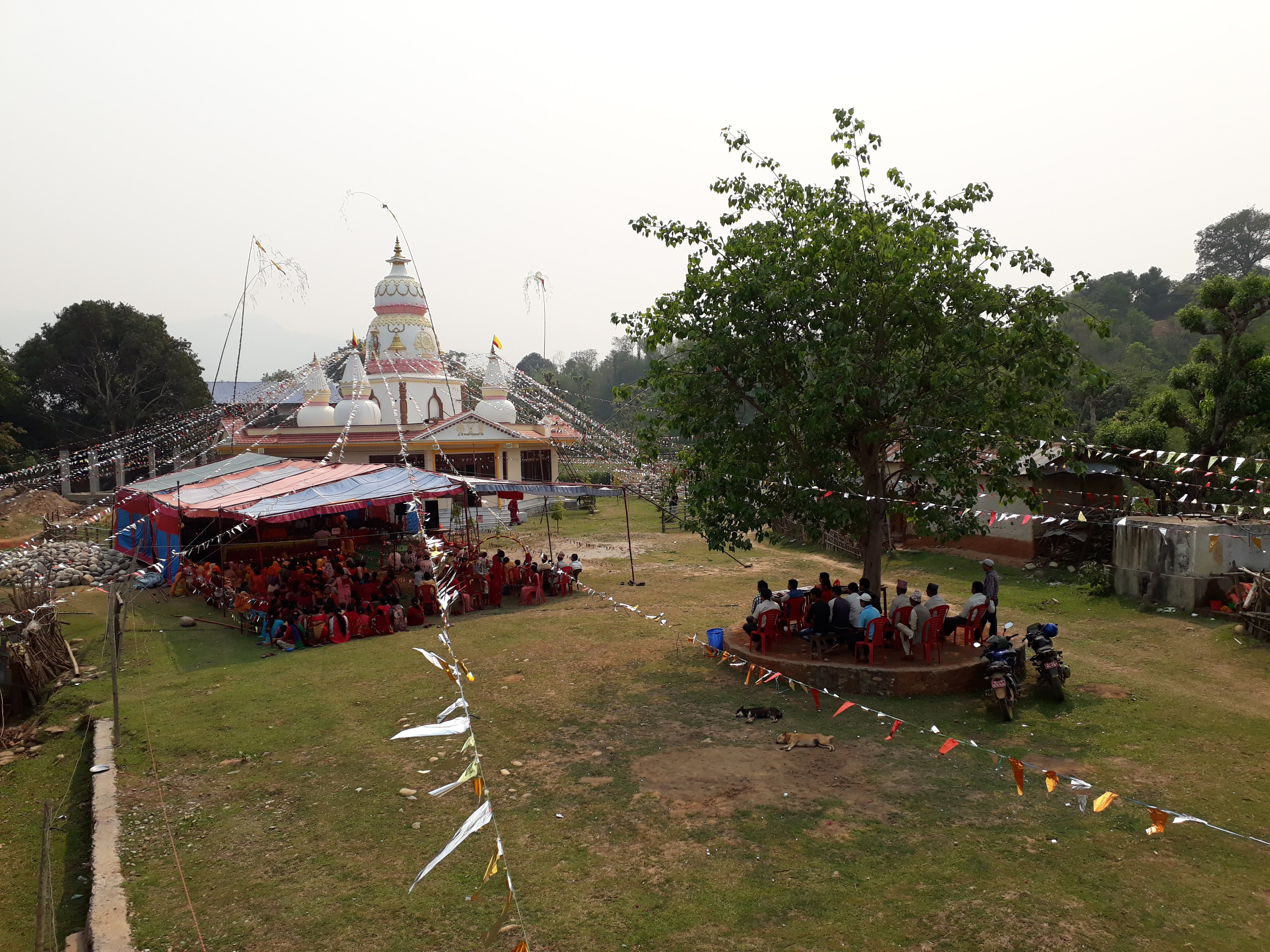
Keladighat Temple
