= List of mayors of municipalities in Nepal =

The Mayor is the highest-ranking official in a municipal government in Nepal. There are in total 293 mayors in Nepal (6 metropolitan cities, 11 sub-metropolitan cities, and 276 municipalities). Mayors are very powerful in the municipal government. They are the head of the local government of Nepal. The data available here is of before split of Nepal Communist Party, CPN(UML) and People's Socialist Party, Nepal.

== Overview ==
Party	Koshi	Madhesh	Bagmati	Gandaki	Lumbini	Karnali	Sudurpaschim	Overall
Nepali Congress	24	30	24	15	21	13	18	145
CPN (UML)	23	19	9	8	9	6	8	84
Maoist Centre	0	7	5	2	3	5	3	26
Unified Socialist	1	5	4	1	0	1	1	13
People's Socialist Party	0	8	0	0	1	0	0	9
Loktantrik Samajwadi	0	7	0	0	0	0	0	7
Rastriya Prajatantra Party	1	0	1	0	1	0	0	3
Nagrik Unmukti Party	0	0	0	0	0	0	2	2
Rastriya Janamorcha	0	0	0	1	1	0	0	2
Janamat Party	0	1	0	0	0	0	0	1
Majdoor Kisan	0	0	1	0	0	0	0	1
Independent	1	0	1	0	0	0	1	3
Total	49	77	45	27	36	25	34	293

== List of mayors of Nepal ==
=== Koshi ===
There is 1 Metropolitan city (Biratnagar), 1 Sub-Metropolitan cities (Dharan) and 47 Municipalities in Koshi Pradesh. All together there are 49 Mayors in Koshi Pradesh.

SN	Municipality	Mayor	Political party	District
1	Phungling Municipality	Amir Maden	Nepali Congress	Taplejung District
2	Phidim Municipality	Mitra Prasad Kafle	Nepali Congress	Panchthar District
3	Deumai Municipality	Surya Prasad Pokhrel	CPN (UML)	Ilam District
4	Mai Municipality	Khambasim Limbu	CPN (UML)	Ilam District
5	Ilam Municipality	Kedar Thapa	Nepali Congress	Ilam District
6	Suryodaya Municipality	Ratna Bahadur Rai	CPN (Unified Socialist)	Ilam District
7	Bhadrapur Municipality	Ganesh Pokhrel	Nepali Congress	Jhapa District
8	Damak Municipality	Ram Kumar Thapa	RPP	Jhapa District
9	Gauradaha Municipality	Chhatrapati Subedi	CPN (UML)	Jhapa District
10	Mechinagar Municipality	Gopal Chandra Budhathoki	CPN (UML)	Jhapa District
11	Arjundhara Municipality	Baldev Singh Gomden Tamang	CPN (UML)	Jhapa District
12	Kankai Municipality	Rajendra Kumar Pokhrel	CPN (UML)	Jhapa District
13	Birtamod Municipality	Pabitra Devi Mahatra	CPN (UML)	Jhapa District
14	Shivasatakshi Municipality	Mega Hang Thopra	CPN (UML)	Jhapa District
15	Pathari-Sanischare Municipality	Mohan Prasad Tumbapo	CPN (UML)	Morang District
16	Belbari Municipality	Dil Prasad Rai	CPN (UML)	Morang District
17	Rangheli Municipality	Dilip Kumar Agrawal	CPN (UML)	Morang District
18	Urlabari Municipality	Ganga Prasad Kharel	CPN (UML)	Morang District
19	Letang Municipality	Bhupendra Kumar Lawoti	CPN (UML)	Morang District
20	Sunbarsi Municipality	Shyam Prasad Rajbanshi	CPN (UML)	Morang District
21	Sundar Haraicha Municipality	Kedar Prasad Guragain	CPN (UML)	Morang District
22	Biratnagar Metropolitan	Nagesh Koirala	Nepali Congress	Morang District
23	Ratuwamai municipality	Nageswar Prasad Singh Gangai	Nepali Congress	Morang District
24	Itahari Municipality	Hem Karna Paudel	Nepali Congress	Sunsari District
25	Barahakshetra Municipality	Ramesh Karki	Nepali Congress	Sunsari District
26	Duhabi Municipality	Bed Narayan Gachhadar	Nepali Congress	Sunsari District
27	Inaruwa Municipality	Kedar Bhandari	Nepali Congress	Sunsari District
28	Dharan Sub-Metropolitan city	Harka Raj Rai	Independent	Sunsari District
29	Ramdhuni Municipality	Shankar Lal Chaudhari	CPN (UML)	Sunsari District
30	Dhankuta Munacipality	Chintan Tamang	CPN (UML)	Dhankuta District
31	Pakhribas Municipality	Gyan Bahadur Gurung	Nepali Congress	Dhankuta District
32	Mahalaxmi Municipality	Dhrub Raj Raya	Nepali Congress	Dhankuta District
33	Chainpur Municipality	Krishna Kumar Tamang	CPN (UML)	Sankhuwasabha District
34	Dharmadevi Municipality	Udaya Chandra Paudel	CPN (UML)	Sankhuwasabha District
35	Madi Municipality	Jiwan Lingthep	CPN (UML)	Sankhuwasabha District
36	Khandbari Municipality	Mahesh Thapaliya	Nepali Congress	Sankhuwasabha District
37	Panchkhapan Municipality	Bipin Rai	Nepali Congress	Sankhuwasabha District
38	Saḍananda Municipality	Surendra Kumar Udas	CPN (UML)	Bhojpur District, Nepal
39	Bhojpur Municipality	Kailash Kumar Ale	Nepali Congress	Bhojpur District, Nepal
40	Myanglung Municipality	Sanjay Kumar Tumbahangphe	CPN (UML)	Tehrathum District
41	Laligurans Municipality	Arjun Mabohang	Nepali Congress	Tehrathum District
42	Siddhicharan Municipality	Tejan Khanal	Nepali Congress	Okhaldhunga District
43	Diktel Rupakot Majhuwagadhi Municipality	Tirtha Raj Bhattarai	Nepali Congress	Khotang District
44	Halesi Tuwachung Municipality	Bimala Rai	Nepali Congress	Khotang District
45	Solududhkund Municipality	Namjel Jangbu Sherpa	Nepali Congress	Solukhumbu District
46	Chaudandigadhi Municipality	Kaluman Lama	CPN (UML)	Udayapur District
47	Triyuga Municipality	Basanta Kumar Basnet	Nepali Congress	Udayapur District
48	Katari Municipality	Rajesh Chandra Rai	Nepali Congress	Udayapur District
49	Belaka Municipality	Ashok Karki	Nepali Congress	Udayapur District

- Nepali Congress-23
- CPN (UML)-23
- CPN (Unified Socialist)-1
- RPP-1
- Independent politician-1

=== Madhesh Pradesh ===
There is 1 Metropolitan city, 3 Sub-Metropolitan Cities, 73 Municipalities in Province No. 2. Altogether there are 77 Mayors in Province no. 2.

SN	Municipality	Mayor	Political party	District
50	Kanchanrup Municipality	Lalan Prasad Gupta	Nepali Congress	Saptari District
51	Saptakoshi Municipality	Krishna Prasad Dhakal	Nepali Congress	Saptari District
52	Surunga Municipality	Gita Chaudhary	Nepali Congress	Saptari District
53	Dakneshwori Municipality	Ram Lakhan Malah	CPN (UML)	Saptari District
54	Bodebarsain Municipality	Atesh Kumar Singh	PSP-N	Saptari District
55	Rajbiraj Municipality	Bhimraj Yadav	PSP-N	Saptari District
56	Khadak Municipality	Jay Prakash Chaudhary Tharu	CPN (MC)	Saptari District
57	Hanumannagar Kankalini Municipality	Birendra Majhi	Janamat Party	Saptari District
58	Shambhunath Municipality	Jitendra Prasad Gupta Kalwar	CPN (Unified Socialist)	Saptari District
59	Lahan Municipality	Mahesh Prasad Chaudhary	Nepali Congress	Siraha District
60	Mirchaiya Municipality	Shrawan Kumar Yadav	CPN (MC)	Siraha District
61	Sukhipur Municipality	Ram Awtar Yadav	CPN (UML)	Siraha District
62	Golbazar Municipality	Shyam Kumar Shrestha	CPN (UML)	Siraha District
63	Dhangadhimai Municipality	Shivshankar Mahato	CPN (UML)	Siraha District
64	Karjanha Municipality	Bhola Prasad Pokhrel	CPN (UML)	Siraha District
65	Siraha Municipality	Arman	CPN (UML)	Siraha District
66	Kalyanpur Municipality	Ram Pukar Sah Teli	CPN (UML)	Siraha District
67	Janakpur, Sub-Metropolitan City	Manoj Kumar Sah	Nepali Congress	Dhanusa District
68	Dhanusadham Municipality	Baleshwar Mandal	Nepali Congress	Dhanusa District
69	Nagarain Municipality	Binay Kumar Yadav	Nepali Congress	Dhanusa District
70	Mithila Municipality	Mahendra Mahato	Nepali Congress	Dhanusa District
71	Kamala Municipality	Biseshwar Yadav	Nepali Congress	Dhanusa District
72	Hansapur Municipality	Pradip Kumar Yadav	Nepali Congress	Dhanusa District
73	Mithila Bihari Municipality	Rajendra Prasad Yadav	Nepali Congress	Dhanusa District
74	Ganeshman Charanath Municipality	Jit Narayan Yadav	Nepali Congress	Dhanusa District
75	Chhireshwarnath Municipality	Sukhdev Yadav	CPN (UML)	Dhanusa District
76	Bideha Municipality	Bechan Das Tatma	CPN (UML)	Dhanusa District
77	Sabaila Municipality	Kariram Yadav	CPN (MC)	Dhanusa District
78	Sahidnagar Municipality	Dinesh Prasad Yadav	PSP-N	Dhanusa District
79	Aurahi Municipality	Pradip Kumar Khadka	LSP-N	Mahottari District
80	Matihani Municipality	Hari Prasad Mandal	LSP-N	Mahottari District
81	Balawa Municipality	Ram Bijan Mahato	LSP-N	Mahottari District
82	Bhangaha municipality	Sanjeev Kumar Sah	LSP-N	Mahottari District
83	Gaushala Municipality	Dipendra Mahato	PSP-N	Mahottari District
84	Jaleshwar Municipality	Suresh Sah Sonar	PSP-N	Mahottari District
85	Ramgopalpur Municipality	Ram Dular Sah	CPN (UML)	Mahottari District
86	Loharpatti Municipality	Shailendra Kumar Yadav	Nepali Congress	Mahottari District
87	Bardibas Municipality	Prahlad Kumar Chhetri	Nepali Congress	Mahottari District
88	Manara Shiswa Municipality	Mohan Pandeya	Nepali Congress	Mahottari District
89	Bagmati Municipality	Bharat Kumar Thapa	CPN (MC)	Sarlahi District
90	Balara Municipality	Ramashankar Prasad Kushwaha	CPN (MC)	Sarlahi District
91	Hariwan Municipality	Ramesh Budhathoki	CPN (MC)	Sarlahi District
92	Barahathwa Municipality	Kalpana Kumari Katuwal	CPN (UML)	Sarlahi District
93	Godaita Municipality	Devendra Kumar Yadav	LSP-N	Sarlahi District
94	Ishwarpur Municipality	Manoj Kumar Acharya	Nepali Congress	Sarlahi District
95	Lalbandi Municipality	Bashudev Adhikari	Nepali Congress	Sarlahi District
96	Haripurwa Municipality	Binod Kumar Sah Teli	Nepali Congress	Sarlahi District
97	Kabilasi Municipality	Barhamdev Raya	Nepali Congress	Sarlahi District
98	Haripur, Municipality	Gopal Panjiyar	Nepali Congress	Sarlahi District
99	Malangawa Municipality	Nagendra Prasad Yadav	Nepali Congress	Sarlahi District
100	Gujara Municipality	Shantlal Prasad Chaudhary	PSP-N	Rautahat District
101	Garuda Municipality	Kanthmani Prasad Kalwar	CPN (UML)	Rautahat District
102	Dewahi Gonahi Municipality	Premlal Sah Kanu	CPN (UML)	Rautahat District
103	Maulapur Municipality	Rina Kumari Sah	CPN (UML)	Rautahat District
104	Ishanath Municipality	Kaushalya Devi	LSP-N	Rautahat District
105	Phatuwa Bijayapur Municipality	Gopal Raya Yadav	Nepali Congress	Rautahat District
106	Gadhimai Municipality	Shyam Prasad Yadav	Nepali Congress	Rautahat District
107	Madhav Narayan Municipality	Baijnath Prasad Yadav	Nepali Congress	Rautahat District
108	Katahariya Municipality	Ajay Prakash	Nepali Congress	Rautahat District
109	Chandrapur Municipality	Sanjay Kumar Kafle	Nepali Congress	Rautahat District
110	Paroha Municipality	Sheikh Wakil	Nepali Congress	Rautahat District
111	Rajpur Municipality	Morajik Aalam	Nepali Congress	Rautahat District
112	Budhimai, Municipality	Pradip Kumar Yadav	CPN (Unified Socialist)	Rautahat District
113	Brindaban Municipality	Binod Prasad Kurmi	CPN (Unified Socialist)	Rautahat District
114	Gaur Municipality	Sambhu Sah	CPN (Unified Socialist)	Rautahat District
115	Rajdevi Municipality	Bhikhari Prasad Yadav	CPN (Unified Socialist)	Rautahat District
116	Kolhabi Municipality	Ram Prasad Chaudhary	Nepali Congress	Bara District
117	Mahagadhimai Municipality	Upendra Prasad Yadav	Nepali Congress	Bara District
118	Jitpur Simara Municipality	Rajan Paudel	CPN (MC)	Bara District
119	Pacharauta Municipality	Jalandhar Singh Jayaswal	CPN (UML)	Bara District
120	Kalaiya Sub Metropolitan city	Binod Prasad Sah	CPN (UML)	Bara District
121	Nijgadh Municipality	Surath Puri	CPN (UML)	Bara District
122	Simraungadh Municipality	Kishori Prasad Kalwar	LSP-N	Bara District
123	Parsagadhi Municipality	Gokarna Pathak	CPN (UML)	Parsa District
124	Pokhariya Municipality	Praduman Prasad Chauhan	CPN (UML)	Parsa District
125	Bahudarmai Municipality	Singasan Sah Teli	PSP-N	Parsa District
126	Birgunj Metropolitan City	Rajesh Man Singh	PSP-N	Parsa District

- Nepali Congress-30
- CPN (UML)-19
- PSP-N-8
- CPN (MC)-7
- CPN (Unified Socialist)-5

=== Bagmati Province ===
Bagmati Pradesh have 3 Metropolitan cities, 1 Sub-Metropolitan city and 41 Municipalities. Altogether there are 45 Mayors In Bagmati province .

SN	Municipality	Mayor	Political party	District
127	Kathmandu Metropolitan City	Sunita Dangol (acting)	CPN (UML)	Kathmandu District
128	Tokha municipality	Prakash Adhikari	CPN (UML)	Kathmandu District
136	Budhalikantha Municipality	Mitharam Adhikari	CPN (UML)	Kathmandu District
128	Gokarneshwar Municipality	Deepak Kumar Risal	Nepali Congress	Kathmandu District
129	Chandragiri Municipality	Ghanshyam Giri	Nepali Congress	Kathmandu District
130	Dakshinkali Municipality	Mohan Basnet	Nepali Congress	Kathmandu District
131	Nagarjun Municipality	Mohan Bahadur Basnet	Nepali Congress	Kathmandu District
133	Tarakeshwar Municipality	Krishna Hari Maharjan	Nepali Congress	Kathmandu District
134	Kirtipur municipality	Raj Kumar Nakarmi	Nepali Congress	Kathmandu District
135	Kageshwari-Manohara Municipality	Upendra Karki	Nepali Congress	Kathmandu District
137	Shankharapur Municipality	Ramesh Napit	Rastriya Prajatantra Party	Kathmandu District
138	Lalitpur Metropolitan City	Chiri Babu Maharjan	Nepali Congress	Lalitpur District, Nepal
139	Godawari Municipality	Gajendra Maharjan	Nepali Congress	Lalitpur District, Nepal
140	Mahalaxmi Municipality	Hari Govinda Shrestha	CPN (UML)	Lalitpur District, Nepal
142	Bhaktapur	Sunil Prajapati	Nepal Majdoor Kishan Party	Bhaktapur District
143	Suryabinayak Municipality	Bashudev Thapa	CPN (UML)	Bhaktapur District
144	Changunarayan Municipality	Jeevan Khatri	Nepali Congress	Bhaktapur District
145	Madhyapur Thimi Municipality	Surendra Shrestha	Nepali Congress	Bhaktapur District
146	Thaha Municipality	Bishnu Bahadur Bista	CPN (MC)	Makwanpur District
147	Hetauda	Mina Kumari Lama	CPN (Unified Socialist)	Makwanpur District
148	Bahrabise Municipality	Bal Krishna Basnet	Nepali Congress	Sindhupalchok District
149	Melamchi Municipality	Aaaita Man Tamang	Nepali Congress	Sindhupalchok District
150	Chautara Sangachowkgadi Municipality	Krishna Prasad Sapkota	CPN (Maoist Centre)	Sindhupalchok District
151	Bhimeswor Municipality	Ishwor Narayan Manandhar	Nepali Congress	Dolakha District
152	Jiri Municipality	Mitra Bahadur Jirel	CPN (UML)	Dolakha District
153	Kamalamai Municipality	Upendra Kumar Pokhrel	Nepali Congress	Sindhuli District
154	Dudhauli Municipality	Dinesh Adhikari	CPN (MC)	Sindhuli District
155	Manthali Municipality	Lav Shrestha	CPN (UML)	Ramechhap District
156	Ramechhap municipality	Lawa Shree Neupane	Nepali Congress	Ramechhap District
157	Dhulikhel Municipality	Ashok Byanju Shrestha	CPN (UML)	Kavrepalanchok District
158	Namo buddha Municipality	Kunsang Lama	Nepali Congress	Kavrepalanchok District
159	Panauti Municipality	Ram Sharan Bhandari	Nepali Congress	Kavrepalanchok District
160	Banepa Municipality	Shanti Ratna Shakya	Nepali Congress	Kavrepalanchok District
161	Panchkhal Municipality	Mahesh Kharel	Nepali Congress	Kavrepalanchok District
162	Mandandeupur Municipality	Tok Bahadur Tamang	CPN (Unified Socialist)	Kavrepalanchok District
163	Bidur Municipality	Rajan Shrestha	Nepali Congress	Nuwakot District
164	Dhunibeshi Municipality	Bal Krishna Acharya	CPN (Unified Socialist)	Dhading District
165	Nilkantha Municipality	Bhim Prasad Dhungana	Nepali Congress	Dhading District
166	Khairhani Municipality	Shashi Kumar Khaniya	Nepali Congress	Chitwan District
167	Ratnagar Municipality	Pralad Sapkota	Nepali Congress	Chitwan District
168	Rapti Municipality	Shamsher Lama	CPN (Unified Socialist)	Chitwan District
169	Kalika Municipality	Binod Regmi	CPN (UML)	Chitwan District
170	Madi Municipality	Tara Kumari Kaji Mahato	CPN (UML)	Chitwan District
171	Bharatpur Metropolitan city	Renu Dahal	CPN (Maoist Centre)	Chitwan District

- Nepali Congress-24
- CPN (UML)-10
- CPN (MC)-5
- CPN (Unified Socialist)-4
- RPP-1
- NWPP-1
- Independent politician-1

=== Gandaki Province ===
There is 1 Metropolitan city and 26 Municipalities in Gandaki Pradesh. Altogether there are 27 Mayors In Gandaki Pradesh.

SN	Municipality	Mayor	Political party	District
172	Gorkha Municipality	Krishna Bahadur Rana	CPN (Maoist Centre)	Gorkha District
173	Palungtar Municipality	Bibas Chintan	CPN (Maoist Centre)	Gorkha District
174	Pokhara Metropolitan City	Dhana Raj Acharya	CPN (Unified Socialist)	Kaski District
175	Besisahar Municipality	Guman Singh Aryal	CPN (UML)	Lamjung District
176	Madhya Nepal Municipality	Ramesh Kumar Pandey	Nepali Congress	Lamjung District
177	Rainas Municipality	Khadga Bahadur Gurung	Nepali Congress	Lamjung District
178	Sundarbazar Municipality	Krishna Prasad Koirala	Nepali Congress	Lamjung District
179	Vyas Municipality	Baikuntha Nath Neupane	Nepali Congress	Tanahun District
180	Bhanu Municipality	Ananda Raj Tripathi	Nepali Congress	Tanahun District
181	Shuklagandaki Municipality	Krishna Raj Pandit	Nepali Congress	Tanahun District
182	Bhimad Municipality	Dadhiraj Subedi	CPN (UML)	Tanahun District
183	Kushma Municipality	Ram Chandra Joshi	Nepali Congress	Parbat District
184	Phalebas Municipality	Gangadhar Tiwari	Nepali Congress	Parbat District
185	Beni Municipality	Surat KC	CPN (UML)	Myagdi District
186	Galkota Municipality	Bharat Sharma	Nepali Congress	Baglung District
187	Baglung Municipality	Basanta Kumar Shrestha	Nepali Congress	Baglung District
188	Jaimuni Municipality	Nar Bahadur Pun	Rastriya Janamorcha	Baglung District
189	Dhorpatan Municipality	Dev Kumar Nepali	CPN (UML)	Baglung District
190	Gaindakot Municipality	Madan Bhakta Adhikari	Nepali Congress	Nawalparasi District
191	Kawasoti Municipality	Bishnu Prasad Bhusal	CPN (UML)	Nawalparasi District
192	Devachuli Municipality	Hari Prasad Neupane	CPN (UML)	Nawalparasi District
193	Madhyabindu Municipality	Bhimlal Adhikari	CPN (UML)	Nawalparasi District
194	Galyang Municipality	Guru Prasad Bhattarai	Nepali Congress	Syangja District
195	Putalibazar Municipality	Tulsi Ram Regmi	Nepali Congress	Syangja District
196	Chapakot Municipality	Dev Bahadur Khand	Nepali Congress	Syangja District
196	Bhirkot Municipality	Govinda Karmacharya	Nepali Congress	Syangja District
197	Waling Municipality	SAMM	CPN (UML)	Syangja District

- Nepali Congress-15
- CPN (UML)-8
- CPN (MC)-2
- CPN (Unified Socialist)-1
- Janamrorcha-1

=== Lumbini Province ===
There are 4 Sub-Metropolitan cities and 32 Municipalities. Altogether there are 36 Mayors In Province No 5 .

SN	Municipality	Mayor	Political party	District
198	Nepalganj Sub Metropolitan City	Prashant Bista	Nepali Congress	Banke District
199	Kohalpur Municipality	Purna Prasad Acharya	Nepali Congress	Banke District
200	Gulariya Municipality	Muktinath Yadav	Nepali Congress	Bardiya District
201	ThakurBaba Municipality	Tilakram Lamsal	Nepali Congress	Bardiya District
202	Barbardiya Municipality	Chabilal Tharu	Nepali Congress	Bardiya District
203	Madhuman Municipality	Tej Bhadur Bhat	Nepali Congress	Bardiya District
204	Basgadi Municipality	Khadka Bahadur Khadka	CPN (UML)	Bardiya District
205	Rajapur Municipality	Dipesh Tharu	CPN (MC)	Bardiya District
206	Musikot Municipality	Jiblal Kharel Jivan	CPN (UML)	Gulmi District
207	Resunga Municipality	Khil Dhwaj Panthi	Nepali Congress	Gulmi District
208	Tansen Municipality	Santosh Lal Shrestha	Nepali Congress	Palpa District
209	Rampur Municipality	Raman Bahadur Thapa	Nepali Congress	Palpa District
210	Butwal Sub Metropolitan City	Khel Raj Pandey	Nepali Congress	Rupandehi District
211	Tilottama, Rupandehi Municipality	Chor kumar yadav		Rupandehi District
212	Siddarthanagar Municipality	Daka kumar Sharma		Rupandehi District
213	Sainamania Municipality	Sandeep Lamichhane		Rupandehi District
214	Devadaha Municipality	Rohit Poudel		Rupandehi District
215	Lumbini Sanskrit Municipality			Rupandehi District
216	Bhumikhastana Municipality			Arghakhanchi District
217	Sandhikharka Municipality			Arghakhanchi District
218	Sitaganga Municipality			Arghakhanchi District
219	Kapilvastu Municipality			Kapilvastu District
220	Krishna Nagar Municipality			Kapilvastu District
221	Banganga Municipality			Kapilvastu District
222	Buddhabhumi Municipality			Kapilvastu District
223	Maharajgunj Municipality			Kapilvastu District
224	Shivraj Municipality			Kapilvastu District
225	Swargadwari Municipality			Pyuthan District
226	Pyuthan Municipality			Pyuthan District
227	Rolpa Municipality			Rolpa District
228	Tulsipur Municipality			Dang District, Nepal
229	Ghorahi Municipality			Dang District, Nepal
230	Lamahi Municipality			Dang District, Nepal
231	Bardaghat Municipality			Nawalparasi District
232	Ramgram Municipality			Nawalparasi District
233	Sunwal Municipality	Bimala Aryal	CPN(UML) (UML)	Nawalparasi District

- Nepali Congress-21
- https://www.himaldarpan.com/special/palpa-aka-kathmandus-younger-brother-a-city-of-tradition-and-culture/#:~:text=Meanwhile%2C%20King%20Rudra%20Sen%2C%20the,called%20Palpa%20to%20the%20east.&text=Palpa%20is%20located%20about%205,established%20by%20King%20Rudra%20Sen.9
- CPN (MC)-3
- RPP-1
- PSP-N-1
- Janamrorcha-1

=== Karnali Province ===
There are only 1 Sub-Metropolitan City and 24 Municipalities and Mayors in Karnali Pradesh.

SN	Municipality	Mayor	Political party	District
234	Birendranagar Municipality	Mohan Maya Bhandari	CPN (UML)	Surkhet District
235	Gurbhakot Municipality	Hasta Pun	Nepali Congress	Surkhet District
236	Panchapuri Municipality	Lalbir Bhandari	Nepali Congress	Surkhet District
237	Lekbeshi Municipality	Umesh Kumar Paudel	Nepali Congress	Surkhet District
238	Bheriganga Municipality	Yagya Prasad Dhakal	CPN (UML)	Surkhet District
239	Musikot Municipality	Mahendra KC	Nepali Congress	Rukum District
240	Aathbis Kot Municipality	Ravi KC	CPN (MC)	Rukum District
241	Chaurjahari Municipality	Puspa Badi	CPN (MC)	Rukum District
242	Sarada Municipality	Prakash Bhandari	Nepali Congress	Salyan District, Nepal
243	Bagchaur Municipality	Janak Raj Gautam	Nepali Congress	Salyan District, Nepal
244	Bangad Kupinde Municipality	Karna Bahadur Budhathoki	CPN (MC)	Salyan District, Nepal
245	Narayan Municipality	Loman Sharma	CPN (UML)	Dailekh District
246	Aathabis Municipality	Tarka Bahadur Budwal	CPN (UML)	Dailekh District
247	Chamunda Bindrasaini Municipality	Ganesh Kumar Shahi	Nepali Congress	Dailekh District
248	Dullu Municipality	Bharat Prasad Rijal	Nepali Congress	Dailekh District
249	Bheri Municipality	Chandra Prakash Gharti	CPN (UML)	Jajarkot District
250	Chhedagad Municipality	Ratna Bahadur Khadka	Nepali Congress	Jajarkot District
251	Triveni Naalgaad Municipality	Dambar Bahadur Rawat	CPN (MC)	Jajarkot District
252	Thuli Bheri Municipality	Swarna Bahadur Budha	Nepali Congress	Dolpa District
253	Tripurasundari Municipality	Jan Chandra Rokaya	CPN (MC)	Dolpa District
254	Khadachakra Municipality	Kamal Bahadur Shahi	CPN (Unified Socialist)	Kalikot District
255	Tilagupha municipality	Shankar Prasad Upadhyaya	Nepali Congress	Kalikot District
256	Raskot municipality	Dharmaraj Shahi	CPN (MC)	Kalikot District
257	Chayanta Rara Municipality	Bishnu Kumar Bam	Nepali Congress	Mugu District
258	Chandannath Municipality	Raju Singh Kathayat	Nepali Congress	Jumla District

- Nepali Congress-13
- CPN (UML)-6
- CPN (MC)-5
- CPN (Unified Socialist)-1

=== Sudurpashchim Province ===
There are altogether 33 Municipalities, 1 Sub-metropolitan city in Sudurpachim Pradesh. In total there are 34 Mayors in Sudurpachim Pradesh.

SN	Municipality	Mayor	Political party	District
259	Dhangadhi Sub-Metropolitan City	Gopal Hamal	Independent	Kailali District
260	Lamki Chuha Municipality	Sushila Shahi	NC	Kailali District
261	Godawari Municipality	Birendra Bhatta	Nepali Congress	Kailali District
262	Ghodaghodi Municipality	Khadak Bahadur Raut	CPN (Unified Socialist)	Kailali District
263	Gauriganga Municipality	Devi Datta Kandel	CPN (MC)	Kailali District
264	Tikapur Municipality	Ram Lal Dagaura Tharu	Nagrik Unmukti Party	Kailali District
265	Bhajani Trisakti Municipality	Kewal Chaudhary	Nagrik Unmukti Party	Kailali District
266	Bhimdatta Municipality	Padam Bogati	Nepali Congress	Kanchanpur District
269	Krishnapur Municipality	Hemraj Ojha	Nepali Congress	Kanchanpur District
267	Bedkot Municipality	Bhojraj Bohara	Nepali Congress	Kanchanpur District
268	Punarbas Municipality	Toya Prasad Sharma	Nepali Congress	Kanchanpur District
271	Belauri Municipality	Potilal Chaudhary	CPN (MC)	Kanchanpur District
270	Mahakali Municipality	Kishor Kumar Limbu	CPN (UML)	Kanchanpur District
272	Shuklaphanta Municipality	Ran Bahadur Mahara	CPN (UML)	Kanchanpur District
273	Jaya Prithvi Municipality	Chet Raj Baral	Nepali Congress	Bajhang District
274	Bungal Municipality	Jay Bahadur Dhami	Nepali Congress	Bajhang District
275	Sanphebagar Municipality	Rajendra Bahadur Kunwar	Nepali Congress	Achham District
276	Kamalbazar Municipality	Yagya Prasad Dhakal	Nepali Congress	Achham District
277	Panchadeval Binayak Municipality	Ambika Kumari Chalaune	Nepali Congress	Achham District
278	Badimalika Municipality	Amar Bahadur Khadka	CPN (UML)	Bajura District
279	Budhinanda Municipality	Janak Kumar Bohara	CPN (UML)	Bajura District
280	Budhiganga Municipality	Ram Bahadur Baniya	CPN (UML)	Bajura District
281	Triveni Municipality	Karna Bahadur Thapa	Nepali Congress	Bajura District
282	Dipayal SIlgadhi Municipality	Baji Singh Khadka	Nepali Congress	Doti District
283	Shikar Municipality	Dirgha Bahadur Balayar	Nepali Congress	Doti District
284	Mahakali Municipality	Narsingh Chairshir	CPN (UML)	Darchula District
285	Shailyaskar Municipality	Bijay Singh Dhami	CPN (UML)	Darchula District
286	Malikarjun Municipality	Hira Singh Dhami	CPN (UML)	Darchula District
287	Amargadhi Municipality	Dilli Raj Joshi	Nepali Congress	Dadeldhura District
288	Parshuram Municipality	Bharat Badayar Joshi	Nepali Congress	Dadeldhura District
289	Dashrath Chand Municipality	Pushkar Raj Joshi	CPN (UML)	Baitadi District
290	Purchadi Municipality	Dipak Bahadur Bam	Nepali Congress	Baitadi District
291	Patan Municipality	Gairi Singh Rawat	Nepali Congress	Baitadi District
292	Melauli Municipality	Bhim Bahadur Chand	CPN (MC)	Baitadi District

- Nepali Congress-18
- CPN (UML)-8
- CPN (MC)-3
- NUP-2
- CPN (Unified Socialist)-1
- Independent Politician-1

== See also ==
- List of chairpersons of rural municipalities in Nepal
- 2022 Nepalese local elections
- Government of Nepal
