= Gurbhakot =

Gurbhakot गुर्भाकोट नगरपालिका
- Municipality
- Location in Nepal
- Coordinates: 28.439042°N 81.852828°E
- Country: Nepal
- Province: Karnali
- District: Surkhet
- Total Wards: 14
- Established: 1 October 2015
- Established as: Shubhaghat Gangamala

Government
  - Mayor: Mr. Hasta Pun (NC)
  - Deputy Mayor: Mrs. Maina BK (NC)

Area of Municipality
  - Total: 228.62 km^{2} (88.27 sq mi)

Population (2011)
  - Total: 43,765

Languages
  - Official: Nepali
- Time zone: UTC+5:45 (NST)
- Website: official website

Gurbhakot (Nepali: गुर्भाकोट) is an urban municipality located in Surkhet District of Karnali province of Nepal.

According to 2011 Nepal census the total population of the municipality is 43,765 and the total area of the municipality is 228.62 square kilometres (88.27 mi^{2}). The municipality is divided into total 14 wards. Malarani, Dharapani and Sahare VDC were Incorporated with Subhaghat Gangamala municipality in 2017 when government cancelled all old administration system and introduce new 753 local level administrative body.

The municipality is surrounded by Salyan in east, Bheriganga in west, Simta and Chingad in north and Salyan in south.

== History ==
Subhaghat Gangamala municipality was established on 1 December 2015 merging 4 VDC Dahachaur, Ghumkhahare, Gumi and Mehelkuna.

In 2017 when new administrative system applied Malarani, Dharapani and Sahare incorporated with Subhaghat Gangamala municipality and renamed as Gurbhakot municipality.

== Demographics ==
At the time of the 2011 Nepal census, Gurbhakot Municipality had a population of 44,359. Of these, 95.5% spoke Nepali, 4.3% Magar, 0.1% Maithili and 0.1% other languages as their first language.

In terms of ethnicity/caste, 29.2% were Chhetri, 26.9% Kami, 26.2% Magar, 5.0% Hill Brahmin, 3.4% Damai/Dholi, 2.8% Thakuri, 2.2% Gurung, 1.8% Sarki, 0.8% Sanyasi/Dasnami, 0.7% Badi, 0.2% Gaine, 0.2% Newar, 0.1% Bote, 0.1% Majhi, 0.1% Musalman, 0.1% Raji, 0.1% Tharu, 0.1% Yadav and 0.1% others.

In terms of religion, 96.1% were Hindu, 2.5% Christian, 1.1% Buddhist, 0.1% Muslim and 0.1% others.

In terms of literacy, 71.6% could read and write, 3.0% could only read and 25.3% could neither read nor write.
