= Surkhet 1 =

Parliamentary constituency in Nepal

- Parliamentary constituency for the House of Representatives
- Surkhet 1 in Karnali Province

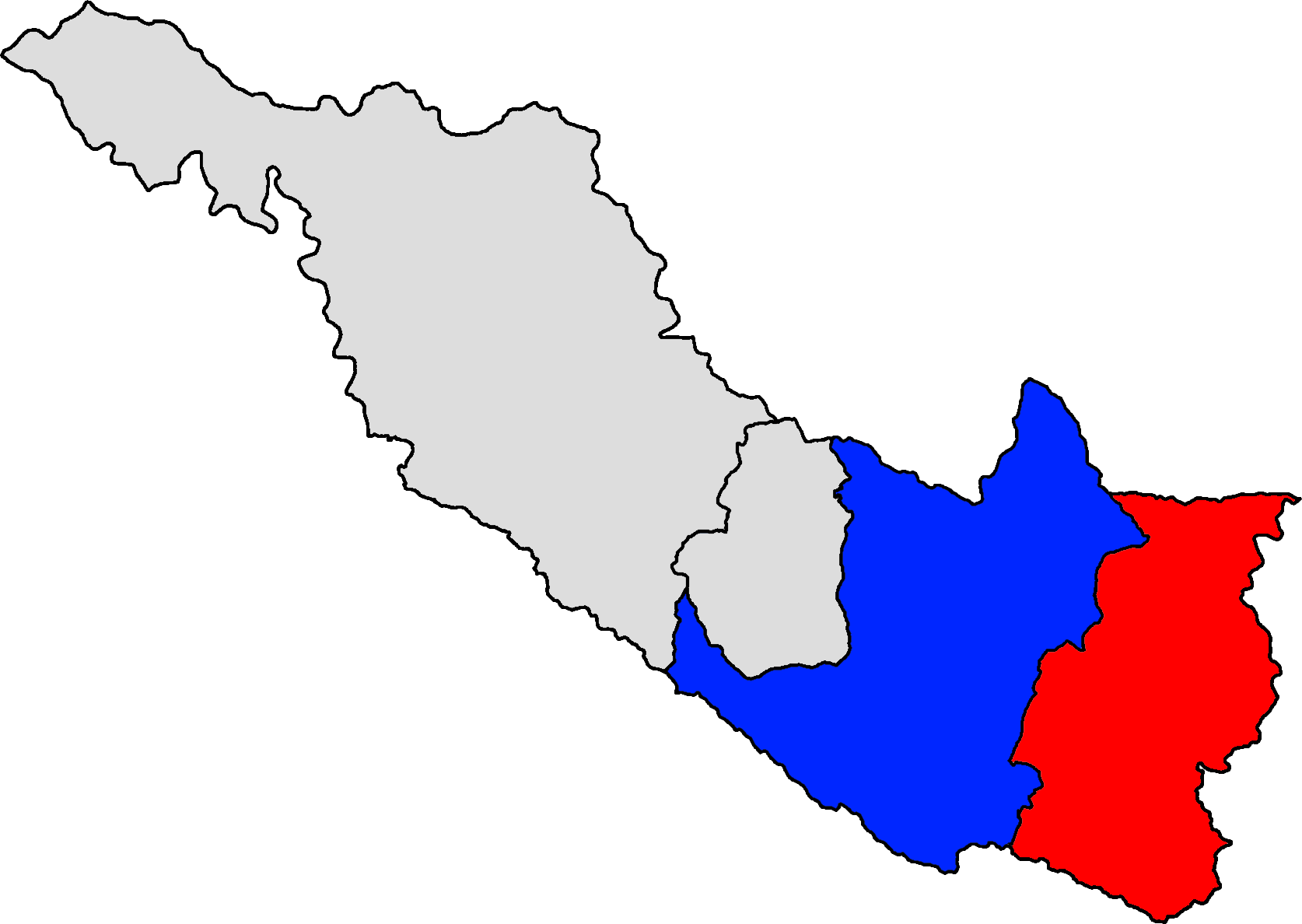
- Assembly segments Surkhet 1(A) (red) and Surkhet 1(B) (blue) within Surkhet District
- Province: Karnali Province
- District: Surkhet District
- Electorate: 101,637

Current constituency
- Created: 1991
- Number of members: 3
- Member of Parliament: Purna Bahadur Khadka, Congress
- Karnali MPA 1(A): Khadga Bahadur Pokharel, Congress
- Karnali MPA 1(B): Kirshna Bahadur G.C., Maoist Centre

Surkhet 1 is one of two parliamentary constituencies of Surkhet District in Nepal. This constituency came into existence on the Constituency Delimitation Commission (CDC) report submitted on 31 August 2017.

== Incorporated areas ==
Surkhet 1 incorporates Gurbhakot Municipality, Bheriganga Municipality, Simta Rural Municipality, Chingad Rural Municipality, Lekbeshi Municipality and wards 15 and 16 of Birendranagar Municipality.

== Assembly segments ==
It encompasses the following Karnali Provincial Assembly segment

- Surkhet 1(A)
- Surkhet 1(B)

== Members of Parliament ==
=== Parliament/Constituent Assembly ===
Election	Member	Party
1991	Purna Bahadur Khadka	Nepali Congress
2008	Kamala Sharma	CPN (UML)
2013	Purna Bahadur Khadka	Nepali Congress
2017	Dhurba Kumar Shahi	CPN (UML)
May 2018	Dhurba Kumar Shahi	Nepal Communist Party
March 2021	Dhurba Kumar Shahi	CPN (UML)
2022	Purna Bahadur Khadka	Nepali Congress

=== Provincial Assembly ===
==== 1(A) ====
Election	Member	Party
2017	Thammar Bahadur Bista	CPN (Maoist Centre)
May 2018	Thammar Bahadur Bista	Nepal Communist Party
March 2021	Thammar Bahadur Bista	CPN (Maoist Centre)
2022	Khadga Bahadur Pokharel	Nepali Congress

==== 1(B) ====
Election	Member	Party
2017	Khadak Bahadur Khatri	CPN (UML)
May 2018	Khadak Bahadur Khatri	Nepal Communist Party
March 2021	Khadak Bahadur Khatri	CPN (UML)
2022	Krishna Bahadur G.C.	CPN (Maoist Centre)

== Election results ==
=== Election in the 2020s ===
==== 2022 general election ====
Candidate	Party	Votes	%
Purna Bahadur Khadka	Nepali Congress	42,607	56.35
Dhurba Kumar Shahi	CPN (UML)	30,988	40.98
Others		2,020	2.67
Total		75,615	100.00
Majority		11,619	
Nepali Congress gain			

==== 2022 provincial election ====
===== 1(A) =====
Candidate	Party	Votes	%
Khadga Bahadur Pokharel	Nepali Congress	18,264	53.88
Thammar Bahadur Bista	CPN (UML)	15,237	44.95
Others		397	1.17
Total		33,898	100.00
Majority		3,027	
Nepali Congress gain			

===== 1(B) =====
Candidate	Party	Votes	%
Krishna Bahadur G.C.	CPN (Maoist Centre)	21,734	51.79
Dandi Prasad Sharma	CPN (UML)	17,538	41.79
Man Bahadur Kharal	Rastriya Prajatantra Party	1,483	3.53
Others		1,208	2.88
Total		41,963	100.00
Majority		4,196	
CPN (Maoist Centre) gain			

=== Election in the 2010s ===
==== 2017 general election ====
Candidate	Party	Votes	%
Dhurba Kumar Shahi	CPN (UML)	36,759	51.66
Purna Bahadur Khadka	Nepali Congress	33,377	46.91
Others		1,017	1.43
Total		71,153	100.00
Valid votes		71,153	97.81
Invalid/blank votes		1,594	2.19
Total votes		72,747	100.00
Registered voters/turnout		101,637	71.58
Majority		3,382	
CPN (UML) gain			
Source: Election Commission

==== 2022 provincial election ====
===== 1(A) =====
Candidate	Party	Votes	%
Thammar Bahadur Bista	CPN (Maoist Centre)	15,352	49.36
Tek Bahadur Singh Thakuri	Nepali Congress	15,132	48.65
Others		618	1.99
Total		31,102	100.00
Valid votes		31,102	97.99
Invalid/blank votes		639	2.01
Total votes		31,741	100.00
Registered voters/turnout		44,347	71.57
Majority		220	
CPN (Maoist Centre) gain			
Source: Election Commission

===== 1(B) =====
Candidate	Party	Votes	%
Khadak Bahadur Khatri	CPN (UML)	21,621	53.73
Jhak Bahadur Dhangi	Nepali Congress	17,728	44.05
Others		892	2.22
Total		40,241	100.00
Valid votes		40,241	98.10
Invalid/blank votes		778	1.90
Total votes		41,019	100.00
Registered voters/turnout		57,290	71.60
Majority		3,893	
CPN (UML) gain			
Source: Election Commission

==== 2013 Constituent Assembly election ====
Candidate	Party	Votes	%
Purna Bahadur Khadka	Nepali Congress	17,301	45.60
Kamala Sharma	CPN (UML)	15,398	40.58
Thammar Bahadur Bista	UCPN (Maoist)	3,780	9.96
Others		1,463	3.86
Total		37,942	100.00
Valid votes		37,942	97.74
Invalid/blank votes		878	2.26
Total votes		38,820	100.00
Registered voters/turnout		47,938	80.98
Majority		1,903	
Nepali Congress gain			
Source: Election Commission

=== Election in the 2000s ===
==== 2008 Constituent Assembly election ====
Candidate	Party	Votes	%
Kamala Sharma	CPN (UML)	18,804	43.21
Lal Bahadur Ghale	Nepali Congress	12,335	28.35
Khadga Bahadur Gharti	CPN (Maoist)	10,878	25.00
Others		1,499	3.44
Total		43,516	100.00
Valid votes		43,516	97.61
Invalid/blank votes		1,065	2.39
Total votes		44,581	100.00
Registered voters/turnout		67,913	65.64
Majority		6,469	
CPN (UML) gain			
Source: Election Commission

=== Election in the 1990s ===
==== 1999 general election ====
Candidate	Party	Votes	%
Purna Bahadur Khadka	Nepali Congress	16,980	47.16
Rishi Prasad Sharma	CPN (UML)	16,594	46.09
Man Bahadur Khatri	CPN (Marxist–Leninist)	1,523	4.23
Others		909	2.52
Total		36,006	100.00
Valid votes		36,006	98.31
Invalid/blank votes		620	1.69
Total votes		36,626	100.00
Registered voters/turnout		49,879	73.43
Majority		386	
Nepali Congress hold			
Source: Election Commission

==== 1994 general election ====
Candidate	Party	Votes	%
Purna Bahadur Khadka	Nepali Congress	13,771	45.25
Rishi Prasad Sharma	CPN (UML)	12,654	41.58
Chandra Bahadur Budha Magar	Rastriya Prajatantra Party	3,213	10.56
Others		796	2.62
Total		30,434	100.00
Majority		1,117	
Nepali Congress hold			
Source: Election Commission

==== 1991 general election ====
Candidate	Party	Votes	%
Purna Bahadur Khadka	Nepali Congress	21,637	46.94
-	CPN (UML)	20,016	43.42
Others		4,444	9.64
Total		46,097	100.00
Majority		1,621	
Nepali Congress gain			

== See also ==
- List of parliamentary constituencies of Nepal
