= Putalibazar =

Putalibazar पुतलीबजार
- Municipality
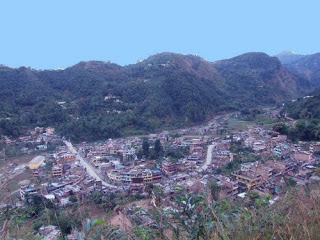
- A view of Putalibazar, Syangja

- Location within Putalibazar Location within Syangja District Location within Gandaki Province Location within Nepal
- Coordinates: 28°06′00″N 83°52′15″E
- Country: Nepal
- Province: Gandaki Province
- District: Syangja District

Government
  - Mayor: Shima Chhetri (NCP)
  - Deputy Mayor: Mahesh Puri (NCP)

Area
  - Total: 146.21 km^{2} (56.45 sq mi)

Population (2011 Nepal census)
  - Total: 44,876
  - Density: 306.93/km^{2} (794.94/sq mi)
- Time zone: UTC+5:45 (NST)
- Area code: 063
- Website: Official Website

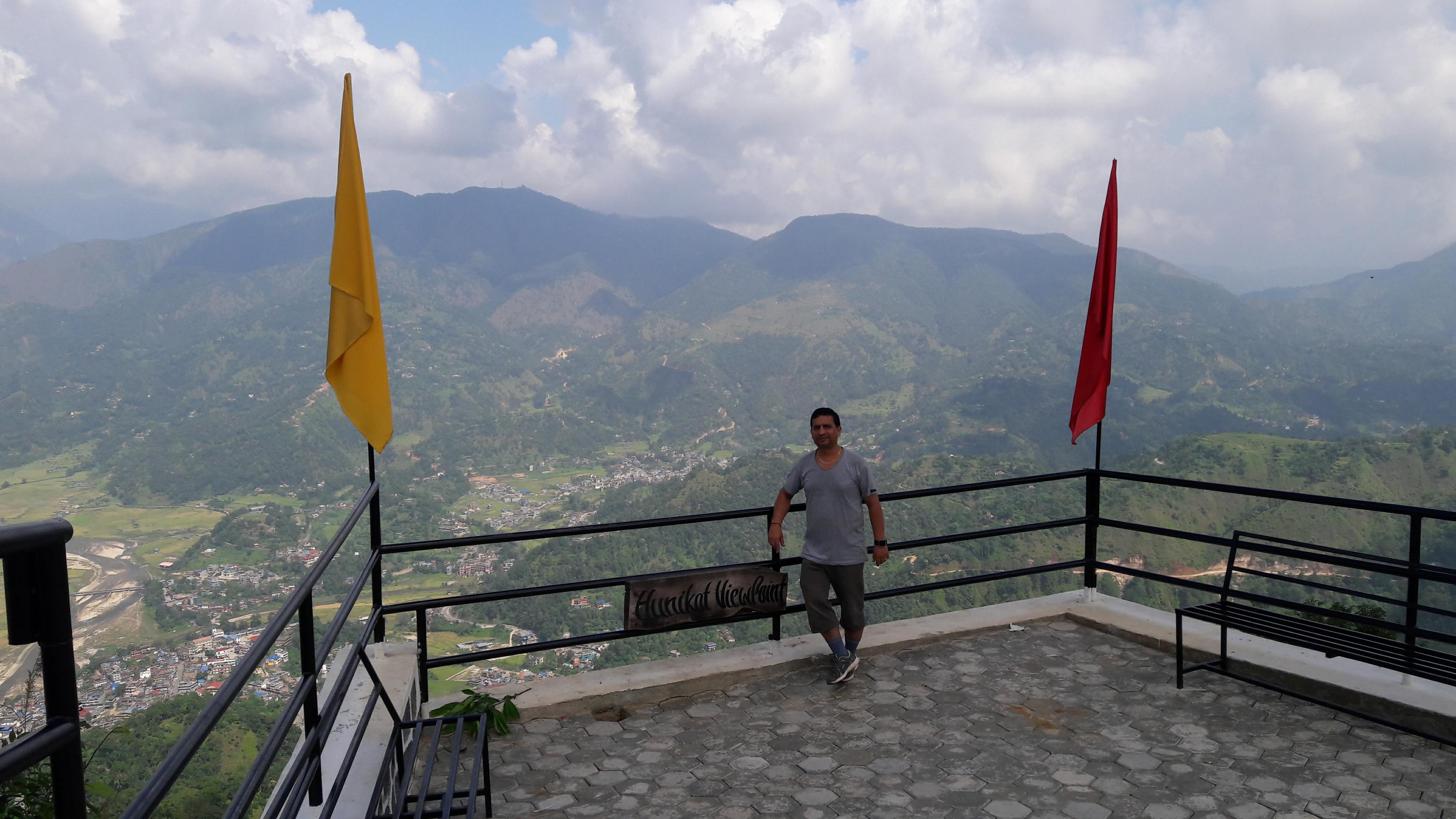
Syangja Putalibazar from Hunikot.

Putalibazar (Nepali: पुतलीबजार) is a municipality and district headquarter of Syangja District in Gandaki Province of central Nepal. Putalibazar is a famous city of Syangja District.

== History ==
Putalibazar is the biggest municipality in Syangja District. According to 2011 Nepal census, it had a total populations of 30,704 people residing in 8,180 individual households. With many village development committees (VDCs), it has been the center for the business and official municipality of Syangja. Before the Waling municipality was named, it was the only municipality in Syangja. The dominant political parties in Putalibazar are Nepali Congress and CPN UML.

On 12 March 2017, the government of Nepal implemented a new local administrative structure consisting of 744 local units. With the implementation of the new local administrative structure, VDCs have been replaced with municipal & village councils. Putalibazar is one of these 744 local units. Putalibazar is created by merging Taksar, Pauwegaude, Thuladihi, Bahakot, Kolma Barahachaur, (1-3,9) Wards of Rangvang & (1,2,4-8) Wards of Pelkachaur.

== Political situation ==
Putalibazar is divided into 14 Wards. It is surrounded by Kaski District & Fedikhola at northern side, Kaski District & Tanahun District from east, Aandhikhola, Arjun Chaupari & Bhirkot Municipality from west and Biruwa & Bhirkot Municipality at south. Birgha Archale is its headquarter.

== Population ==
Putalibazar is created by merging Taksar, Pauwegaude, Thuladihi, Bahakot, Kolma Barahachaur, (1-3,9) Wards of Rangvang & (1,2,4-8) Wards of Pelkachaur. The sum population of Putalibazar, 44,876, is residing in an area of 146.21 km^{2}.

== Climate ==
Climate data for Putalibazar (Syangja District), elevation 871 m (2,858 ft), (1991–2020 normals)
Month	Jan	Feb	Mar	Apr	May	Jun	Jul	Aug	Sep	Oct	Nov	Dec	Year
Mean daily maximum °C (°F)	20.1 (68.2)	22.9 (73.2)	27.2 (81.0)	29.8 (85.6)	30.2 (86.4)	31.3 (88.3)	31.0 (87.8)	31.1 (88.0)	30.5 (86.9)	28.5 (83.3)	24.7 (76.5)	21.0 (69.8)	27.4 (81.2)
Daily mean °C (°F)	13.1 (55.6)	15.7 (60.3)	19.2 (66.6)	22.3 (72.1)	24.1 (75.4)	26.1 (79.0)	26.6 (79.9)	26.6 (79.9)	25.8 (78.4)	22.5 (72.5)	18.4 (65.1)	14.3 (57.7)	21.2 (70.2)
Mean daily minimum °C (°F)	6.1 (43.0)	8.4 (47.1)	11.1 (52.0)	14.8 (58.6)	17.9 (64.2)	20.8 (69.4)	22.1 (71.8)	22.0 (71.6)	21.0 (69.8)	16.4 (61.5)	12.1 (53.8)	7.5 (45.5)	15.0 (59.0)
Average precipitation mm (inches)	25.5 (1.00)	31.5 (1.24)	39.8 (1.57)	101.8 (4.01)	273.6 (10.77)	544.9 (21.45)	754.0 (29.69)	620.8 (24.44)	355.6 (14.00)	90.8 (3.57)	10.9 (0.43)	19.3 (0.76)	2,879.2 (113.35)
Source 1: Department of Hydrology and Meteorology
Source 2: Agricultural Extension in South Asia (precipitation 1976–2005)

== Media ==
To pomote local culture, Putalibazar has one FM radio station called Community Radio Syangja FM 89.6 MHz which is a Community radio station. Recently in 2019 Syangja television was launched which airs audio video programs covering local and national news.(Ritu Raj Lamsal).

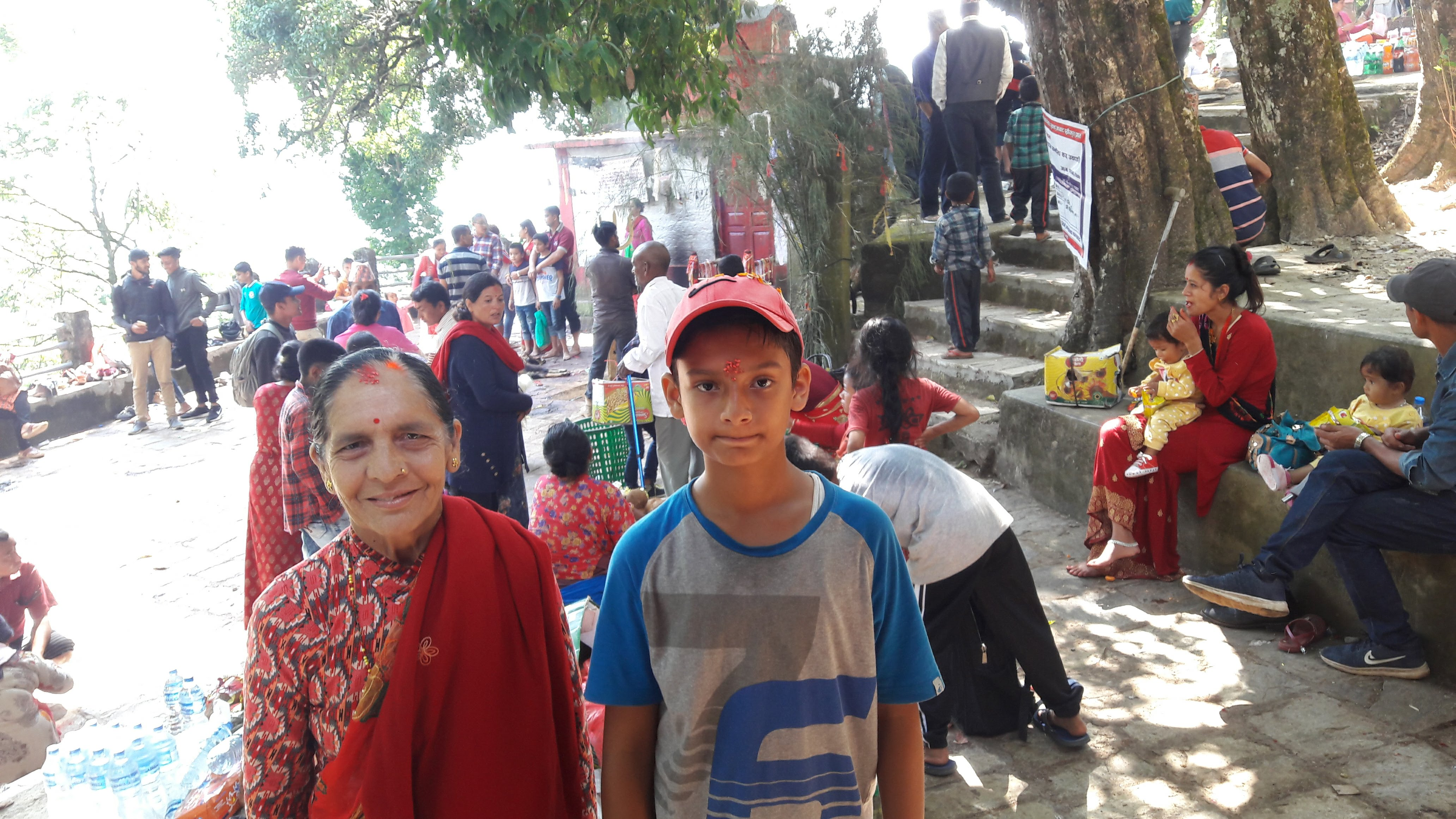
Chandithaan Devi temple in Syangja.
