= Surkhet 2 =

Parliamentary constituency in Nepal

- Parliamentary constituency for the House of Representatives
- Surkhet 2 in Karnali Province

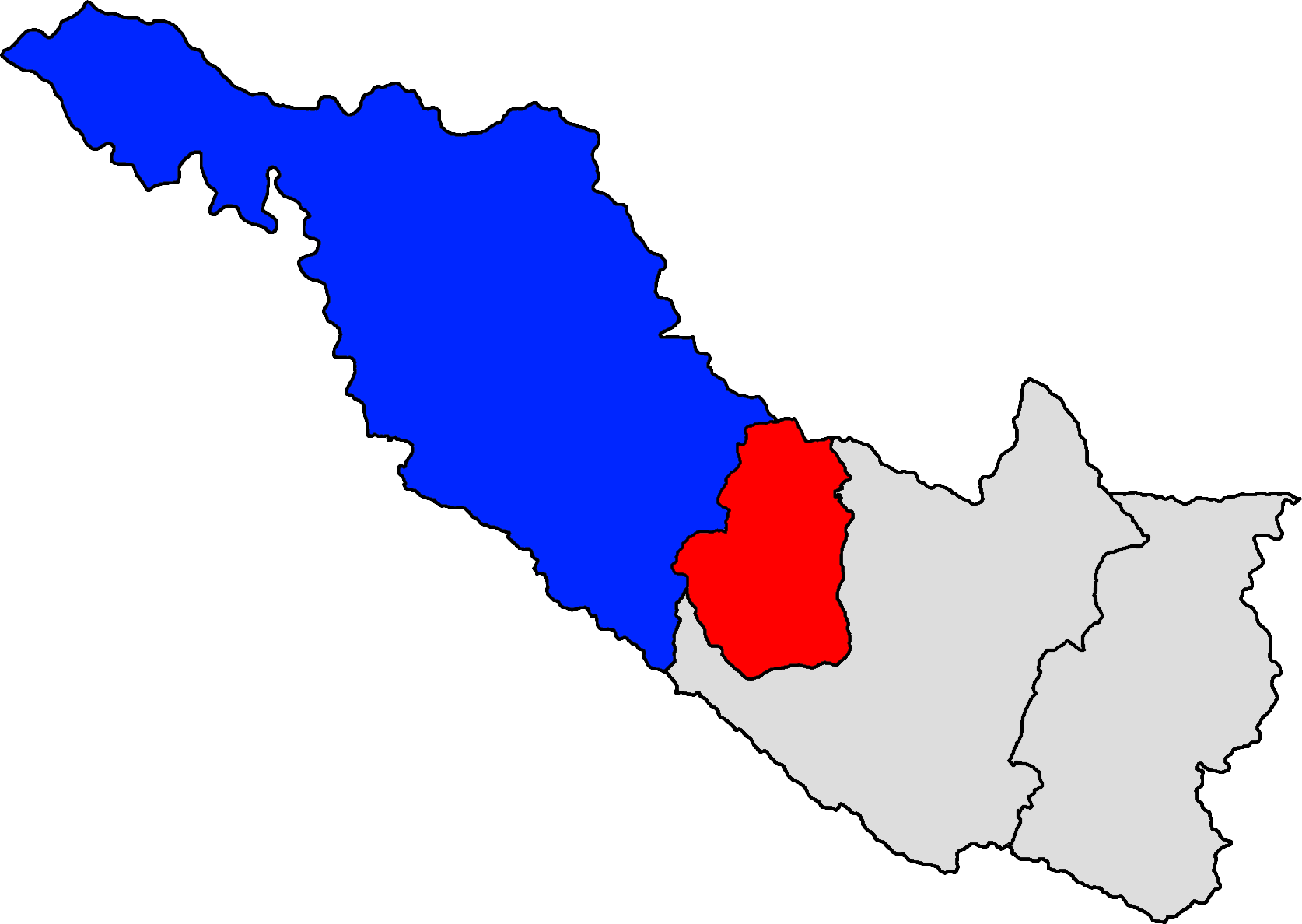
- Assembly segments Surkhet 2(A) (red) and Surkhet 2(B) (blue) within Surkhet District
- Province: Karnali Province
- District: Surkhet District
- Electorate: 102,940

Current constituency
- Created: 1991
- Number of members: 3
- Party: Rastriya Swatantra Party
- Member of Parliament: Ramesh Kumar Sapkota
- Karnali MPA 2(A): Yam Lal Kandel, UML
- Karnali MPA 2(B): Binda Man Bista, Maoist Centre

Surkhet 2 is one of two parliamentary constituencies of Surkhet District in Nepal. This constituency came into existence on the Constituency Delimitation Commission (CDC) report submitted on 31 August 2017.

== Incorporated areas ==
Surkhet 2 incorporates Chaukune Rural Municipality, Panchpuri Municipality, Barahtal Rural Municipality and wards 1–14 of Birendranagar Municipality.

== Assembly segments ==
It encompasses the following Karnali Provincial Assembly segment

- Surkhet 2(A)
- Surkhet 2(B)

== Members of Parliament ==
=== Parliament/Constituent Assembly ===
Election	Member	Party
1991	Shiva Raj Joshi	Nepali Congress
1994	Yam Lal Kandel	CPN (UML)
March 1998	Yam Lal Kandel	CPN (Marxist–Leninist)
1999	Hridaya Ram Thani	Nepali Congress
2008	Yam Lal Kandel	CPN (UML)
2013	Hridaya Ram Thani	Nepali Congress
2017	Nawaraj Rawat	CPN (UML)
May 2018	Nawaraj Rawat	Nepal Communist Party
March 2021	Nawaraj Rawat	CPN (UML)
2022	Hridaya Ram Thani	Nepali Congress
2026	Ramesh Kumar Sapkota	Rastriya Swatantra Party

=== Provincial Assembly ===
==== 2(A) ====
Election	Member	Party
2017	Yam Lal Kandel	CPN (UML)
May 2018	Yam Lal Kandel	Nepal Communist Party
March 2021	Yam Lal Kandel	CPN (UML)

==== 2(B) ====
Election	Member	Party
2017	Binda Man Bista	CPN (Maoist Centre)
May 2018	Binda Man Bista	Nepal Communist Party
March 2021	Binda Man Bista	CPN (Maoist Centre)

== Election results ==
=== Election in the 2020s ===
==== 2022 general election ====
Candidate	Party	Votes	%
Hridaya Ram Thani	Nepali Congress	34,625	47.81
Amrit Bahadur Budha Chhetri	CPN (UML)	29,558	40.81
Tek Bahadur Chunara	Rastriya Swatantra Party	4,601	6.35
Bhim Bahadur Shahi	Rastriya Prajatantra Party	2,632	3.63
Others		1,010	1.39
Total		72,426	100.00
Majority		5,067	
Nepali Congress gain			

==== 2022 provincial election ====
===== 2(A) =====
Candidate	Party	Votes	%
Yam Lal Kandel	CPN (UML)	18,561	43.48
Kali Prasad Shakya	Nepali Congress	18,400	43.10
Surya Bahadur Khatri	Rastriya Prajatantra Party	3,685	8.63
Shiva Prasad Upadhyaya	CPN (Unified Socialist)	1,274	2.98
Others		768	1.80
Total		42,688	100.00
Majority		161	
CPN (UML) hold			

===== 2(B) =====
Candidate	Party	Votes	%
Binda Man Bista	CPN (Maoist Centre)	13,909	45.85
Tara Keshar Gautam	CPN (UML)	9,330	30.76
Mohan Singh Baduwal	CPN (Unified Socialist)	6,209	20.47
Karna Bahadur Regmi Magar	Rastriya Prajatantra Party	792	2.61
Others		94	0.31
Total		30,334	100.00
Majority		4,579	
CPN (Maoist Centre) hold			

=== Election in the 2010s ===
==== 2017 general election ====
Candidate	Party	Votes	%
Nawaraj Rawat	CPN (UML)	37,447	54.28
Hridaya Ram Thani	Nepali Congress	28,646	41.52
Others		2,897	4.20
Total		68,990	100.00
Valid votes		68,990	96.43
Invalid/blank votes		2,557	3.57
Total votes		71,547	100.00
Registered voters/turnout		102,940	69.50
Majority		8,801	
CPN (UML) gain			
Source: Election Commission

==== 2017 provincial election ====
===== 2(A) =====
Candidate	Party	Votes	%
Yam Lal Kandel	CPN (UML)	21,282	53.88
Kamal Raj Regmi	Nepali Congress	15,947	40.37
Others		2,272	5.75
Total		39,501	100.00
Valid votes		39,501	96.56
Invalid/blank votes		1,409	3.44
Total votes		40,910	100.00
Registered voters/turnout		56,267	72.71
Majority		5,335	
CPN (UML) gain			
Source: Election Commission

===== 2(B) =====
Candidate	Party	Votes	%
Binda Man Bista	CPN (Maoist Centre)	15,648	52.86
Tapta Bahadur Bista	Nepali Congress	12,477	42.15
Others		1,475	4.98
Total		29,600	100.00
Valid votes		29,600	96.45
Invalid/blank votes		1,090	3.55
Total votes		30,690	100.00
Registered voters/turnout		46,673	65.76
Majority		3,171	
CPN (Maoist Centre) gain			
Source: Election Commission

==== 2013 Constituent Assembly election ====
Candidate	Party	Votes	%
Hridaya Ram Thani	Nepali Congress	17,419	39.06
Yam Lal Kandel	CPN (UML)	9,118	20.45
Bhim Bahadur Malla	UCPN (Maoist)	7,797	17.49
Shiva Prasad Upadhyaya	Independent	4,565	10.24
Mukunda Shyam Giri	Rastriya Prajatantra Party Nepal	3,167	7.10
Others		2,526	5.66
Total		44,592	100.00
Valid votes		44,592	95.89
Invalid/blank votes		1,912	4.11
Total votes		46,504	100.00
Registered voters/turnout		58,901	78.95
Majority		8,301	
Nepali Congress gain			
Source: Election Commission

=== Election in the 2000s ===
==== 2008 Constituent Assembly election ====
Candidate	Party	Votes	%
Yam Lal Kandel	CPN (UML)	16,297	33.93
Hridaya Ram Thani	Nepali Congress	14,693	30.59
Sita Kumari Nepali	CPN (Maoist)	14,441	30.06
Others		2,604	5.42
Total		48,035	100.00
Valid votes		48,035	96.67
Invalid/blank votes		1,654	3.33
Total votes		49,689	100.00
Registered voters/turnout		76,746	64.74
Majority		1,604	
CPN (UML) gain			
Source: Election Commission

=== Election in the 1990s ===
==== 1999 general election ====
Candidate	Party	Votes	%
Hridaya Ram Thani	Nepali Congress	16,870	45.80
Shiva Raj Upadhyaya	CPN (UML)	15,791	42.87
Yam Lal Kandel	CPN (Marxist–Leninist)	1,936	5.26
Others		2,234	6.07
Total		36,831	100.00
Valid votes		36,831	97.43
Invalid/blank votes		972	2.57
Total votes		37,803	100.00
Registered voters/turnout		51,604	73.26
Majority		899	
Nepali Congress gain			
Source: Election Commission

==== 1994 general election ====
Candidate	Party	Votes	%
Yam Lal Kandel	CPN (UML)	12,848	44.96
Hridaya Ram Thani	Nepali Congress	11,556	40.44
Om Bahadur G.C.	Rastriya Prajatantra Party	4,172	14.60
Total		28,576	100.00
Majority		1,292	
CPN (UML) gain			
Source: Election Commission

==== 1991 general election ====
Candidate	Party	Votes	%
Shiv Raj Joshi	Nepali Congress	16,214	60.44
-	CPN (UML)	10,611	39.56
Total		26,825	100.00
Majority		5,603	
Nepali Congress gain			

== See also ==
- List of parliamentary constituencies of Nepal
