= Bheriganga =

Bheriganga भेरीगंगा नगरपालिका
- Municipality
- Location in province Bheriganga (Nepal)
- Coordinates: 28.45°N 81.61°E
- Country: Nepal
- Province: Karnali
- District: Surkhet
- Total Wards: 13
- Established: 2 December 2014

Government
  - Type: Mayor–council
  - Body: Bheriganga Municipality
  - Mayor: Mr. Yagya Prasad Dhakal (CPN UML)
  - Deputy Mayor: Mrs. Dhansara Bohara (CPN UML)

Area of Municipality
  - Total: 256.20 km^{2} (98.92 sq mi)
- Highest elevation: 1,400 m (4,600 ft)
- Lowest elevation: 500 m (1,600 ft)

Population (2021)
  - Total: 48,203

Languages
  - Official: Nepali
- Time zone: UTC+5:45 (NST)
- Website: official website

Bheriganga (Nepali: भेरीगंगा) is an urban municipality located in Surkhet District of Karnali province of Nepal.

According to 2021 Nepal Census the total population of the municipality is 48,203 and the total area of the municipality is 256.20 square kilometres (98.92 mi^{2}). The municipality is divided into total 13 wards. Lekhparajul VDC was Incorporated with municipality in 2017 when government cancelled all old administration system and introduce new 753 local level administrative body.

The municipality is surrounded by Gurbha Kot in east, Barahatal in west, Birendranagar and Lekbesi in north and Bardiya District in south.

== History ==
Bheriganga municipality was established on 2 December 2014 merging 3 VDC Chinchu, Maintada and Ramghat. Lekhparajul VDC Incorporated with municipality in 2017 when new administrative system came in force.

== Demographics ==
At the time of the 2011 Nepal census, Bheriganga Municipality had a population of 41,865. Of these, 96.1% spoke Nepali, 2.5% Magar, 0.5% Gurung, 0.3% Raji, 0.2% Hindi, 0.1% Urdu, 0.1% Newar, 0.1% Maithili and 0.1% other languages as their first language.

In terms of ethnicity/caste, 42.8% were Chhetri, 23.5% Kami, 13.5% Magar, 4.9% Sarki, 4.2% Damai/Dholi, 4.1% Hill Brahmin, 2.6% Thakuri, 1.0% Sanyasi/Dasnami, 0.9% Badi, 0.7% Gurung, 0.4% Newar, 0.4% Raji, 0.3% Musalman, 0.2% Gaine, 0.1% Halwai, 0.1% Rai, 0.1% Tamang, 0.1% Tharu and 0.2% others.

In terms of religion, 95.7% were Hindu, 3.6% Christian, 0.5% Buddhist and 0.3% Muslim.

In terms of literacy, 70.9% could read and write, 2.7% could only read and 26.4% could neither read nor write.
