= Lekbeshi =

Lekbeshi लेकबेशी
- Municipality
- Location in Nepal
- Coordinates: 28.60°N 81.92°E
- Country: Nepal
- Province: Karnali
- District: Surkhet
- No. of wards: 10
- Established: 10 March 2017

Government
  - Type: Mayor-council
  - Mayor: Mr. Umesh Kumar Paudel (NC)
  - Deputy mayor: Mrs. Bimala Khadluk (NCP)

Area
  - Total: 180.92 km^{2} (69.85 sq mi)

Population (2011)
  - Total: 30,295
  - Density: 167.45/km^{2} (433.69/sq mi)
- Time zone: UTC+5:45 (NST)
- Website: official website

Lekbeshi (Nepali: लेकबेशी) is an urban municipality located in Surkhet District of Karnali Province of Nepal.

The total area of the municipality is 180.92 square kilometres (69.85 sq mi) and the total population of the municipality as of 2011 Nepal census is 30,295 individuals. The municipality is divided into total 10 wards.

The municipality was established on 10 March 2017, when Government of Nepal restricted all old administrative structure and announced 744 local level units as per the new constitution of Nepal 2015.

Lekhfarsa, Dasarathpur, Neta, Kalyan and Satokhani Village development committees were Incorporated to form this new municipality. The headquarters of the municipality is situated at Kalyan

== Demographics ==
At the time of the 2011 Nepal census, Lekbeshi Municipality had a population of 31,583. Of these, 80.6% spoke Nepali, 18.8% Magar, 0.2% Chhantyal, 0.2% Gurung, 0.1% Raji and 0.1% other languages as their first language.

In terms of ethnicity/caste, 46.6% were Magar, 17.7% Chhetri, 14.9% Kami, 10.5% Hill Brahmin, 3.4% Damai/Dholi, 1.4% Thakuri, 1.3% Sarki, 1.3% Gurung, 0.6% Badi, 0.5% Chhantyal, 0.4% Majhi, 0.4% Sanyasi/Dasnami, 0.2% other Dalit, 0.2% Thami, 0.1% Gaine, 0.1% Newar, 0.1% Raji, 0.1% Tamang, 0.1% other Terai, 0.1% Tharu and 0.2% others.

In terms of religion, 88.8% were Hindu, 6.0% Christian, 5.0% Buddhist and 0.2% others.

In terms of literacy, 76.1% could read and write, 2.3% could only read and 21.6% could neither read nor write.
