= Panchapuri =

Panchapuri पञ्चपुरी
- Municipality
- Location in Nepal
- Coordinates: 28.792°N 81.387°E
- Country: Nepal
- Province: Karnali
- District: Surkhet
- No. of wards: 11
- Established: 10 March 2017

Government
  - Type: Mayor-council
  - Former mayor =Upendra Bahadur Thapa[NC Mayor: Mr. Lalbir bhandari (NC)
  - Deputy mayor: Mrs. Muktidevi Regmi (Puri) (NC)

Area
  - Total: 329.9 km^{2} (127.4 sq mi)

Population (2011)
  - Total: 32,231
  - Density: 97.70/km^{2} (253.0/sq mi)
- Time zone: UTC+5:45 (NST)
- Website: official website

Panchapuri (Nepali: पञ्चपुरी) is an urban municipality located in Surkhet District of Karnali Province of Nepal.

The total area of the municipality is 329.9 square kilometres (127.4 sq mi) and the total population of the municipality as of 2011 Nepal census is 32,231 individuals. The municipality is divided into total 11 wards.

The municipality was established on 10 March 2017, when Government of Nepal restricted old administrative structure and announced 744 local level units as per the new constitution of Nepal 2015.

Salkot, Babiyachaue, Chapre, Bidyapur and Tatopani Village development committee were Incorporated to form this new municipality. The municipality is divided into 11 wards and the headquarters of municipality situated at Babiyachaur

== Demographics ==
At the time of the 2011 Nepal census, Panchapuri Municipality had a population of 32,236. Of these, 92.2% spoke Nepali, 6.2% Magar, 1.0% Raji, 0.3% Newar, 0.1% Maithili and 0.1% other languages as their first language.

In terms of ethnicity/caste, 29.2% were Chhetri, 20.0% Kami, 18.6% Hill Brahmin, 15.6% Magar, 6.6% Damai/Dholi, 2.7% Sanyasi/Dasnami, 2.3% Thakuri, 2.0% Sarki, 1.0% Raji, 0.7% Newar, 0.7% other Terai, 0.3% Gurung, 0.2% Badi, 0.1% Kumal, 0.1% Majhi and 0.2% others.

In terms of religion, 91.7% were Hindu, 7.3% Buddhist, 0.9% Christian and 0.1% others.

In terms of literacy, 70.5% could read and write, 2.4% could only read and 27.0% could neither read nor write.
