= Ramghat =

Ramghat may refer to:

- Ramghat, Bheri, Nepal
- Ramghat, Lumbini, Nepal
