= Agragaun =

Place in Nepal

Agragaun आग्रागाउँ
- Village development committee
- Location in Nepal
- Coordinates: 28°36′0″N 81°59′24″E
- Country: Nepal
- Province: Karnali Province
- District: Surkhet District

Population (1991)
  - Total: 2,370
- Time zone: UTC+5:45 (Nepal Time)

Agragaun is a village development committee in Surkhet District in Karnali Province of mid-western Nepal. At the time of the 1991 Nepal census it had a population of 2370 people living in 381 individual households.
