= Taksar =

Taksar may refer to:

- Taksar, Syangja, Nepal
- Taksar, Bhojpur, Nepal
