= Lagam =

Lagam लगाम
- Village development committee
- Location in Nepal
- Coordinates: 28.93°N 81.08°E
- Country: Nepal
- Zone: Bheri Zone
- District: Surkhet District

Population (1991)
  - Total: 3,839
- Time zone: UTC+5:45 (Nepal Time)

Lagam is a village development committee in Surkhet District in the Bheri Zone of midwestern Nepal. At the 1991 Nepal census, it had a population of 3839 people in 647 households.
