= Lekhgaun =

Lekhgaun may refer to:

- Lekhgaun, Bheri
- Lekhgaun, Seti
