= Awalaching =

Coordinates: 28°38′N 81°47′E

Awalaching अवालाचिङ
- Village development committee
- Interactive map of Awalaching
- Country: Nepal
- Province: Karnali Province
- District: Surkhet District

Population (1991)
  - Total: 1,911
- Time zone: UTC+5:45 (Nepal Time)

Awalaching is a village development committee in Surkhet District in Karnali Province of mid-western Nepal. At the time of the 1991 Nepal census it had a population of 1911 people living in 286 individual households.
