= Bajedichaur =

Bajedichaur बजेडिचौर
- Village development committee
- Location in Nepal
- Coordinates: 28.56°N 81.95°E
- Country: Nepal
- Province: Karnali Province
- District: Surkhet District

Population (1991)
  - Total: 3,357
- Time zone: UTC+5:45 (Nepal Time)

Bajedichaur is a former village development committee in Surkhet District in Karnali Province of mid-western Nepal. At the time of the 1991 Nepal census it had a population of 3357 people living in 563 individual households.
