= Khadga Bahadur Pokharel =

Nepalese politician

Khadga Bhadur Pokharel
- खड्ग बहादुर पोखरेल

Minister for Social Development
- Incumbent
- Assumed office 18 April 2023
- Governor: Tilak Pariyar

Member of Karnali Provincial Assembly
- Incumbent
- Assumed office 2022
- Preceded by: Thammar Bahadur Bista
- Constituency: Surkhet 1(A)

Personal details
- Born: Surkhet, Karnali, Nepal
- Party: Nepali Congress

Khadga Bahadur Pokharel (Nepali: खड्ग बहादुर पोखरेल) is a Nepali politician belonging to Nepali Congress. Pokharel is the current provincial assembly member from Surkhet 1(A). He is currently serving as the Minister for Economic Affairs and Planning of Karnali Province.

== Electoral history ==
=== 2022 Nepalese provincial elections ===
Candidate	Party	Votes	%
Khadga Bahadur Pokharel	Nepali Congress	18,264	53.88
Thammar Bahadur Bista	CPN (UML)	15,237	44.95
Others		397	1.17
Total		33,898	100.00
Majority		3,027	
Nepali Congress gain			
