= Purna Bahadur Khadka =

Nepalese politician

- पूर्ण बहादुर खड्का
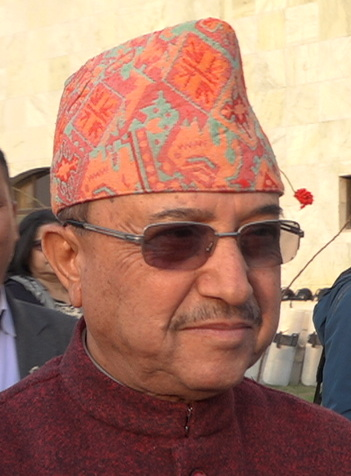
- Khadka in 2023

Deputy Prime Minister of Nepal
- In office 31 March 2023 – 4 March 2024 Serving with Narayan Kaji Shrestha
- President: Ram Chandra Paudel
- Prime Minister: Pushpa Kamal Dahal
- Vice President: Ram Sahaya Yadav
- Preceded by: Bishnu Prasad Paudel

Minister of Defence
- In office 31 March 2023 – 4 March 2024
- President: Ram Chandra Paudel
- Prime Minister: Pushpa Kamal Dahal
- Vice President: Ram Sahaya Yadav
- Preceded by: Pushpa Kamal Dahal

Vice-president of Nepali Congress
- In office 16 December 2021 – 14 January 2026 Serving with Dhanraj Gurung
- President: Sher Bahadur Deuba
- Preceded by: Bimalendra Nidhi
- Succeeded by: Bishwa Prakash Sharma

Member of Parliament, House of Representatives
- In office 22 December 2022 – 12 September 2025
- Constituency: Surkhet 1

Personal details
- Born: 29 February 1956 (age 70)
- Party: Nepali Congress
- Spouse: Ratna Khadka
- Parent: Prem Bahadur Khadka (father)
- Education: Tribhuvan University

Purna Bahadur Khadka is a Nepali politician, belonging to the Nepali Congress, who previously served as the Deputy Prime Minister of Nepal and as Minister for Home and Defence at two different times. A six time parliamentarian Khadka has been working at strength of acting president of Nepali Congress party.

In the 2022 Nepalese general election, he won the election from Surkhet 1 (constituency). He was elected as Vice President of the Nepali Congress on 14th general convention of Nepali Congress held from December 13 to 15 in Kathmandu.

== Political career ==
Khadka has long been active in national politics. He won the Surkhet-1 seat to the House of Representatives in the 2022 general election, defeating CPN-UML candidate Dhruba Kumar Shahi by 11,619 votes.

During his tenure at Defence, Khadka publicly emphasised the strategic importance of the ministry within Nepal’s post-earthquake reconstruction and federal transition context, and pledged to strengthen institutional performance. He left office in March 2024 after a subsequent reshuffle.

== Party leadership ==
At the 14th General Convention of the Nepali Congress, Khadka was elected Vice-President of the party, this was the first time the party elected two vice-presidents. He has since been a leading NC negotiator in coalition governments and internal party deliberations reported in national media.

== Electoral history ==
=== 2022 general election ===
Candidate	Party	Votes	%
Purna Bahadur Khadka	Nepali Congress	42,607	56.35
Dhurba Kumar Shahi	CPN (UML)	30,988	40.98
Others		2,020	2.67
Total		75,615	100.00
Majority		11,619	
Nepali Congress gain			

=== 2017 general election ===
Candidate	Party	Votes	%
Dhurba Kumar Shahi	CPN (UML)	36,759	51.66
Purna Bahadur Khadka	Nepali Congress	33,377	46.91
Others		1,017	1.43
Total		71,153	100.00
Valid votes		71,153	97.81
Invalid/blank votes		1,594	2.19
Total votes		72,747	100.00
Registered voters/turnout		101,637	71.58
Majority		3,382	
CPN (UML) gain			
Source: Election Commission

=== 2013 Constituent Assembly election ===
Candidate	Party	Votes	%
Purna Bahadur Khadka	Nepali Congress	17,301	45.60
Kamala Sharma	CPN (UML)	15,398	40.58
Thammar Bahadur Bista	UCPN (Maoist)	3,780	9.96
Others		1,463	3.86
Total		37,942	100.00
Valid votes		37,942	97.74
Invalid/blank votes		878	2.26
Total votes		38,820	100.00
Registered voters/turnout		47,938	80.98
Majority		1,903	
Nepali Congress gain			
Source: Election Commission

=== 1999 general election ===
Candidate	Party	Votes	%
Purna Bahadur Khadka	Nepali Congress	16,980	47.16
Rishi Prasad Sharma	CPN (UML)	16,594	46.09
Man Bahadur Khatri	CPN (Marxist–Leninist)	1,523	4.23
Others		909	2.52
Total		36,006	100.00
Valid votes		36,006	98.31
Invalid/blank votes		620	1.69
Total votes		36,626	100.00
Registered voters/turnout		49,879	73.43
Majority		386	
Nepali Congress hold			
Source: Election Commission

=== 1994 general election ===
Candidate	Party	Votes	%
Purna Bahadur Khadka	Nepali Congress	13,771	45.25
Rishi Prasad Sharma	CPN (UML)	12,654	41.58
Chandra Bahadur Budha Magar	Rastriya Prajatantra Party	3,213	10.56
Others		796	2.62
Total		30,434	100.00
Majority		1,117	
Nepali Congress hold			
Source: Election Commission

=== 1991 general election ===
Candidate	Party	Votes	%
Purna Bahadur Khadka	Nepali Congress	21,637	46.94
-	CPN (UML)	20,016	43.42
Others		4,444	9.64
Total		46,097	100.00
Majority		1,621	
Nepali Congress gain			
