= Navaraj Rawat =

Nepali politician

Honourable Navaraj Rawat
- नवराज रावत

State Minister of Ministry of Health and Population
- In office 21 November 2019 – 4 June 2021
- President: Bidhya Devi Bhandari
- Prime Minister: KP Oli

Member of Parliament, Pratinidhi Sabha
- In office 4 March 2018 – 18 September 2022
- Preceded by: Hridaya Ram Thani
- Constituency: Surkhet 2

Personal details
- Born: 14 January 1964 (age 62) Surkhet District
- Party: CPN (UML)

Navaraj Rawat (also Nawaraj, Nawraj or Navraj) is a Nepali communist politician and a member of the House of Representatives of the federal parliament of Nepal. He also served as State Minister of Ministry of Health and Population. He was elected from Surkhet-2 constituency representing CPN UML, defeating Hridaya Ram Thani of Nepali Congress by more than 8000 votes. He is the current State Minister of Ministry of Health and Population.
