= Hridaya Ram Thani =

Nepali politician

Honourable Hridaya Ram Thani MP
- हृदयराम थानी

Member of Parliament, Pratinidhi Sabha
- In office 22 December 2022 – 12 September 2025
- Preceded by: Nawaraj Rawat
- Succeeded by: Ramesh Kumar Sapkota
- In office May 1999 – May 2022
- Preceded by: Yam Lal Kandel
- Succeeded by: Yam Lal Kandel
- Constituency: Surkhet 2

Member of 2nd Nepalese Constituent Assembly
- In office 21 January 2014 – 14 October 2017
- Preceded by: Yam Lal Kandel
- Succeeded by: Nawaraj Rawat
- Constituency: Surkhet 2

Personal details
- Born: June 8, 1960 (age 65) Surkhet District
- Party: Nepali Congress

Hridya Ram Thani (Nepali:हृदयराम थानी) is a Nepalese politician. He was elected to the Pratinidhi Sabha, Surkhet Constituency 2, in the 1999 election on behalf of the Nepali Congress.
