= Ramesh Kumar Sapkota =

Nepalese politician

The Honourable Ramesh Kumar Sapkota
- रमेश कुमार सापकोटा

Member of Parliament, Pratinidhi Sabha
- Incumbent
- Assumed office 26 March 2026
- Preceded by: Hridaya Ram Thani
- Constituency: Surkhet 2

Personal details
- Citizenship: Nepalese
- Party: Rastriya Swatantra Party
- Other political affiliations: Nepali Congress (Till Jan 2026)
- Profession: Politician

Ramesh Kumar Sapkota (Note: Nepali: रमेश कुमार सापकोटा) is a Nepalese politician serving as a member of parliament from the Rastriya Swatantra Party. He is the member of the 7th Pratinidhi Sabha elected from Surkhet 2 constituency in 2026 Nepalese General Election securing 30,842 votes and defeating his closest contender Narayan Kumar Koirala of the Nepali Congress. Sapkota is also a district chairman for Rastriya Swatantra Party from Surkhet.

He is also active in transportation sector of Surkhet and entire Karnali region where he is associated with Kankre Bihar Transport Pvt. Ltd. as a chairman and as a coordinator of the National Federation of Nepal Transport Entrepreneurs of Karnali Province. He was formerly affiliated with Nepali Congress, in the position of party Secretary from Birendranagar Municipal Committee before joining RSP.

== Electoral Performance ==
| Election | Year | Constituency | Contested for | Political party | Result | Votes | % of votes | Ref. |
|---|---|---|---|---|---|---|---|---|
| Nepal general election | 2026 | Surkhet 2 | Pratinidhi Sabha member | Rastriya Swatantra Party | Won | 30,842 | 46.49% | |
