= Sahare =

Sahare may refer to:

- Sahare, Bheri, Nepal
- Sahare, Janakpur, Nepal
