= Rajeni =

Coordinates: 28°36′N 81°50′E

Rajeni राजेनी
- Village development committee
- Interactive map of Rajeni
- Country: Nepal
- Zone: Bheri Zone
- District: Surkhet District

Population (1991)
  - Total: 2,730
- Time zone: UTC+5:45 (Nepal Time)

Rajeni is a village development committee in Surkhet District in the Bheri Zone of mid-western Nepal. At the time of the 1991 Nepal census it had a population of 2730 people living in 430 individual households.
