= Binda Man Bista =

Nepalese politician

Honourable Binda Man Bista
- बिन्दमान विष्ट

Minister for Economic Affairs and Planning
- In office 30 November 2021 – 28 August 2022
- Governor: Tilak Pariyar
- Chief Minister: Jeevan Bahadur Shahi
- Preceded by: Gopal Sharma
- Succeeded by: Krishna Shah (Acharya)

Member of the Karnali Provincial Assembly
- Incumbent
- Assumed office 2018
- Preceded by: Constituency created
- Constituency: Surkhet 2 (constituency)

Personal details
- Party: CPN (Maoist Centre)
- Occupation: Politician

Binda Man Bista (Nepali: बिन्दमान विष्ट) is a Nepalese politician and Minister for Economic Affairs and Planning of Karnali Province. He is also a member of Provincial Assembly of Karnali Province belonging to the CPN (Maoist Centre). Bista, a resident of Barahatal Rural Municipality, was elected via 2017 Nepalese provincial elections from Surkhet 2(B).

== Electoral history ==
=== 2017 Nepalese provincial elections ===
Party	Candidate	Votes
CPN (Maoist Centre)	Binda Man Bista	15,648
Nepali Congress	Tapta Bahadur Bista	12,477
Others		1,475
Invalid votes		1,090
Result	Maoist Centre gain	
Source: Election Commission
