= Dharapani, Surkhet =

Dharapani, Bheri धारापानी
- Village development committee
- Location in Nepal
- Coordinates: 28.42°N 81.96°E
- Country: Nepal
- Province: Karnali Province
- District: Surkhet District

Population (1991)
  - Total: 2,542
- Time zone: UTC+5:45 (Nepal Time)

Dharapani, Bheri is a village development committee in Surkhet District in Karnali Province of mid-western Nepal. At the time of the 1991 Nepal census it had a population of 2542 people living in 445 individual households.
