= Babiyachaur, Surkhet =

Babiyachaur बाबियाचौर
- Town Village development committee
- Location in Nepal
- Coordinates: 28.792°N 81.387°E
- Country: Nepal
- Province: Karnali Province
- District: Surkhet District
- Established: 1970s

Government

Area
  - Total: 55 km^{2} (21 sq mi)

Population (2011)
  - Total: 8,517
  - Density: 150/km^{2} (400/sq mi)
- Time zone: UTC+5:45 (Nepal Time)

Babiyachaur is a village development committee in Surkhet District, Karnali Province, of mid-western Nepal. At the time of the 2011 Nepal census it had a population of 8517 people living in 1589 individual households. Brahman, Chhetri, Magar, Kami, Damai are the major ethnic groups.
