= Lekhgaun, Surkhet =

Lekhgaun, Bheri लेखगाउँ
- Village development committee
- Location in Nepal
- Coordinates: 28.48°N 81.63°E
- Country: Nepal
- Zone: Bheri Zone
- District: Surkhet District

Population (1991)
  - Total: 3,999
- Time zone: UTC+5:45 (Nepal Time)

Lekhgaun, Bheri is a village development committee in Surkhet District in the Bheri Zone of mid-western Nepal. At the time of the 1991 Nepal census it had a population of 3999 people living in 651 individual households.
