= Satokhani =

Coordinates: 28°35′N 81°43′E

Satokhani कल्यान
- Village development committee
- Interactive map of Satokhani
- Country: Nepal
- Zone: Bheri Zone
- District: Surkhet District

Population (1991)
  - Total: 6,426
- Time zone: UTC+5:45 (Nepal Time)

Satokhani is a village development committee in Surkhet District in the Bheri Zone of mid-western Nepal. At the time of the 1991 Nepal census it had a population of 6426 people living in 1092 individual households.
