= Kamala Municipality, Dhanusha =

Kamala कमला
- Municipality
- Kamala Municipality (कमला नगरपालिका)
- Location in Nepal
- Coordinates: 26.69°N 86.09°E
- Country: Nepal
- Development Region: Central Development Region
- Zone: Janakpur
- District: Dhanusa District
- Province: Province No. 2
- Established: 2016 A.D. (2073 B.S.)

Government
  - Type: Mayor-council government
  - Mayor: Bisheshwar Yadav (NC)
  - Deputy Mayor: Shila Devi Mandal (NC)

Area
  - Total: 65.85 km^{2} (25.42 sq mi)

Population (2011)
  - Total: 20,052
  - Density: 304.5/km^{2} (788.7/sq mi)
  - Religions: Hinduism Islam Christianity

Languages
  - Local: Maithili, Tharu, Nepali
- Time zone: UTC+5:45 (NPT)
- Postal Code: 45600
- Area code: 041
- Website: www.kamalasiddhidatrimun.gov.np

Kamala (Nepali: कमला) is a municipality in Danusha District of Province No. 2 of Nepal. It was formed in 2016 occupying current 9 sections (wards) from previous 9 VDCs. It occupies an area of 65.85 km^{2} with a total population of 20,052.
