= Lekhparajul =

Lekhparajul लेखपराजुल
- Village development committee
- Location in Nepal
- Coordinates: 28.49°N 81.81°E
- Country: Nepal
- Zone: Bheri Zone
- District: Surkhet District

Population (1991)
  - Total: 4,567
- Time zone: UTC+5:45 (Nepal Time)

Lekhparajul is a village development committee in Surkhet District in the Bheri Zone of mid-western Nepal. At the time of the 1991 Nepal census it had a population of 4567 people living in 739 individual households.
