= Dhurba Kumar Shahi =

Nepali politician

- ध्रुव कुमार शाही

Member of Parliament, Pratinidhi Sabha
- In office 4 March 2018 – 18 September 2022
- Preceded by: Purna Bahadur Khadka
- Constituency: Surkhet 1

Personal details
- Born: 24 May 1970 (age 55) Surkhet District
- Party: CPN (UML)

Dhurba Kumar Shahi is a Nepalese politician and serving as the Member of House of Representatives (Nepal) elected from Surkhet-1, Province No. 6. He is the member of the Nepal Communist Party.
