= Malarani =

Malarani मालारानी
- Village development committee
- Location in Nepal
- Coordinates: 28.36°N 81.94°E
- Country: Nepal
- Zone: Bheri Zone
- District: Arghakhanchi

Population (1991)
  - Total: 4,170
- Time zone: UTC+5:45 (Nepal Time)

Malarani is a village development committee in Surkhet District in the Bheri Zone of mid-western Nepal. At the time of the 1991 Nepal census it had a population of 4170 people living in 678 individual households.
