= Dev Kumar Nepali =

Nepali politician

- देव कुमार नेपाली

Mayor of Dhorpatan Municipality
- In office 2017–2023

Personal details
- Party: Communist Party of Nepal (Unified Marxist–Leninist) (suspended)
- Other political affiliations: Communist Party of Nepal (Maoist Centre) (former)

Dev Kumar Nepali (Nepali: देव कुमार नेपाली) is a Nepali politician and cooperative entrepreneur who served as the mayor of Dhorpatan Municipality in Baglung District, Nepal. He is also the founder and former chairman of the Image Savings and Credit Cooperative, which operated in Baglung and Pokhara. In recent years, Nepali has been at the center of one of Nepal’s largest cooperative fraud scandals, accused of embezzling over NPR 2.25 billion from thousands of depositors.

== Early life and political career ==
Nepali was born in Burtibang in Baglung District. He began his political journey with the Communist Party of Nepal (Maoist Centre) and later joined the Communist Party of Nepal (Unified Marxist–Leninist) (CPN-UML) after being denied a party ticket in the 2017 local elections. He was elected mayor of Dhorpatan Municipality in 2017 and re-elected in 2022. However, in June 2023, the CPN-UML suspended him from the party after his alleged involvement in a cooperative fraud case came to light.

== Cooperative fraud scandal ==
As the founder and chairman of the Image Savings and Credit Cooperative, Nepali oversaw its operations in Baglung and Pokhara. He is accused of misappropriating over NPR 2.25 billion from around 1,500 depositors in Baglung and 524 in Pokhara. An arrest warrant was issued in June 2023, and Interpol issued a Red Corner Notice against him in January 2024.

He was arrested at Indira Gandhi International Airport in New Delhi in September 2024 and extradited to Nepal. The Baglung District Court ordered him into pre-trial detention.

== Public response ==
While in custody, Nepali addressed a gathering of over 300 victims outside the District Government Attorney’s Office in February 2025, promising to return their money. The case has drawn widespread attention amid allegations that political protection had initially delayed his arrest.

== See also ==
- List of mayors of municipalities in Nepal
