= Neta, Surkhet =

Neta नेटा
- Village development committee
- Location in Nepal
- Coordinates: 28.55°N 81.79°E
- Country: Nepal
- Zone: Bheri Zone
- District: Surkhet District

Population (1991)
  - Total: 3,106
- Time zone: UTC+5:45 (Nepal Time)

Neta is a village development committee in Surkhet District in the Bheri Zone of mid-western Nepal. At the time of the 1991 Nepal census it had a population of 3106 people living in 473 individual households.
