= Kalyan, Nepal =

Kalyan, Nepal कल्याण
- Village development committee
- Location in Nepal
- Coordinates: 28.60°N 81.92°E
- Country: Nepal
- Zone: Bheri Zone
- District: Surkhet District

Population (1991)
  - Total: 4,340
- Time zone: UTC+5:45 (Nepal Time)

Kalyan, Nepal is a village development committee in Surkhet District in the Bheri Zone of mid-western Nepal. At the time of the 1991 Nepal census it had a population of 4340 people living in 713 individual households.
