= Salkot =

Salkot सालकोट
- Village development committee
- Location in Nepal
- Coordinates: 28.81°N 81.47°E
- Country: Nepal
- Zone: Bheri Zone
- District: Surkhet District

Population (1991)
  - Total: 5,027
- Time zone: UTC+5:45 (Nepal Time)

Salkot is a village development committee in Surkhet District in the Bheri Zone of mid-western Nepal.

At the time of the 1991 Nepal census it had a population of 5027 people living in 868 individual households.
