= Mehelkuna =

Mehelkuna मेहेलकुना
- Ciy (Nepal)
- Location in Nepal
- Coordinates: 28.42°N 81.85°E
- Country: Nepal
- Zone: Bheri Zone
- District: Surkhet District

Population (1991)
  - Total: 7,649
- Time zone: UTC+5:45 (Nepal Time)

Mehelkuna is a City in Surkhet District in the Bheri Zone of mid-western Nepal. At the time of the 1991 Nepal census it had a population of 7649 people living in 1404 individual households. There are two Higher Secondary Schools.
