= Ghumkhahare =

Ghumkhahare घुमखहरे
- Village development committee
- Location in Nepal
- Coordinates: 28.46°N 81.91°E
- Country: Nepal
- Zone: Bheri Zone
- District: Surkhet District

Population (1991)
  - Total: 3,906
- Time zone: UTC+5:45 (Nepal Time)

Ghumkhahare is a village development committee in Surkhet District in the Bheri Zone of mid-western Nepal. At the 1991 Nepal census, it had a population of 3906 people living in 631 individual households.
