= Chapre =

Chapre छाप्रे
- Village development committee
- Location in Nepal
- Coordinates: 28.88°N 81.41°E
- Country: Nepal
- Province: Karnali Province
- District: Surkhet District

Population (1991)
  - Total: 2,334
- Time zone: UTC+5:45 (Nepal Time)

Chapre is a village development committee in Surkhet District in Karnali Province of mid-western Nepal. At the time of the 1991 Nepal census it had a population of 2334 people living in 389 individual households.
