= Dahachaur =

Dahachaur दहचौर
- Village development committee
- Location in Nepal
- Coordinates: 28.47°N 81.86°E
- Country: Nepal
- Province: Karnali Province
- District: Surkhet District

Population (1991)
  - Total: 2,746
- Time zone: UTC+5:45 (Nepal Time)

Dahachaur is a village development committee in Surkhet District in the Karnali Province of mid-western Nepal. At the time of the 1991 Nepal census it had a population of 2746 people living in 477 individual households.
