= Ramghat, Surkhet =

Coordinates: 28°30′N 81°43′E

Ramghat रामघाट
- Village Development Committee
- Interactive map of Ramghat
- Country: Nepal
- Zone: Bheri Zone
- District: Surkhet District

Population (1991)
  - Total: 5,581
- Time zone: UTC+5:45 (Nepal Time)
- Postal code: 21700

Ramghat is a Village Development Committee in Surkhet District in the Bheri Zone of mid-western Nepal. At the time of the 1991 Nepal census it had a population of 5581 people residing in 1060 individual households.
