= Kolma Barahachaur =

Kolma Barahachaur कोल्मा बराहाचौर
- Village development committee
- Location in Nepal Kolma Barahachaur (Nepal)
- Coordinates: 28.08°N 83.94°E
- Country: Nepal
- Zone: Gandaki Zone
- District: Syangja District

Population (2011)
  - Total: 1,723
- Time zone: UTC+5:45 (Nepal Time)

Kolma Barahachaur is a village development committee in Syangja District in the Gandaki Zone of central Nepal. At the time of the 2011 Nepal census it had a population of 1723 people living in 443 individual households.
