= Chaukune Rural Municipality =

Rural municipality in Karnali Province, Nepal

Coordinates: 28°50′N 80°51′E

Chaukune (Nepali: चौकुने गाउँपालिका) is a rural municipality located in Surkhet District of Karnali Province of Nepal.

== Demographics ==
At the time of the 2011 Nepal census, Chaukune Rural Municipality had a population of 25,240. Of these, 82.4% spoke Nepali, 16.4% Magar, 0.7% Raji, 0.2% Maithili, 0.1% Gurung, 0.1% Bhojpuri and 0.1% other languages as their first language.

In terms of ethnicity/caste, 28.9% were Chhetri, 25.2% Kami, 19.0% Magar, 14.6% Hill Brahmin, 6.2% Damai/Dholi, 2.1% Thakuri, 0.7% Raji, 0.7% Sanyasi/Dasnami, 0.6% Gurung, 0.4% Lohar, 0.4% Newar, 0.4% Sarki, 0.2% Badi, 0.2% Bengali, 0.2% Majhi, 0.1% Tamang, 0.1% other Terai, 0.1% Tharu and 0.1% others.

In terms of religion, 87.1% were Hindu, 12.4% Buddhist and 0.5% Christian.

In terms of literacy, 66.5% could read and write, 3.5% could only read and 29.9% could neither read nor write.
