= Pauwegaude =

Pauwegaude पौवेगौडे
- Village development committee
- Location in Nepal Pauwegaude (Nepal)
- Coordinates: 28.13°N 83.92°E
- Country: Nepal
- Zone: Gandaki Zone
- District: Syangja District

Population (2011)
  - Total: 2,883
- Time zone: UTC+5:45 (Nepal Time)

Pauwegaude is a village development committee in Syangja District in the Gandaki Zone of central Nepal. At the time of the 2011 Nepal census it had a population of 2883 people living in 805 individual households.
