= Thuladihi =

Thuladihi ठुलाडिही
- Village development committee
- Location in Nepal Thuladihi (Nepal)
- Coordinates: 28.10°N 83.95°E
- Country: Nepal
- Zone: Gandaki Zone
- District: Syangja District

Population (2011)
  - Total: 3,225
- Time zone: UTC+5:45 (Nepal Time)

Thuladihi is a village development committee in Syangja District in the Gandaki Zone of central Nepal. At the time of the 1991 Nepal census it had a population of 3225 people living in 874 individual households.
