= Dhunibeshi Academy =

Dhunibeshi English Higher Secondary Boarding School
- Dhunibesi-7, Khanikhola

Information
- Type: private
- Established: 2052B.S
- Founder: Kedar Pd.Pathak
- Principal: Bhim Bahadur
- Enrollment: 1500+
- Colors: Red, Green, Blue, Yellow

Dhunibeshi Academy is a private boarding school located in Dhading district of Nepal. School was founded in 2052B.S. The school started with 9 students during its establishment now has nearly 900 students. Started in an old mill, now the school has its own new building.

Now the school is running its classes from Nursery to +2 level in a well-equipped building. School has also arranged audio-visual classes with a small library. School has an IT centre David and carolyne memorial education center II established by CAN help, Australia which was inaugurated by Australian ambassador Glen White and his wife.

The school is awarded with the honour for achieving third position for all activities among private schools in Dhading district.
