= Bahakot =

Bahakot बहकोट
- Village development committee
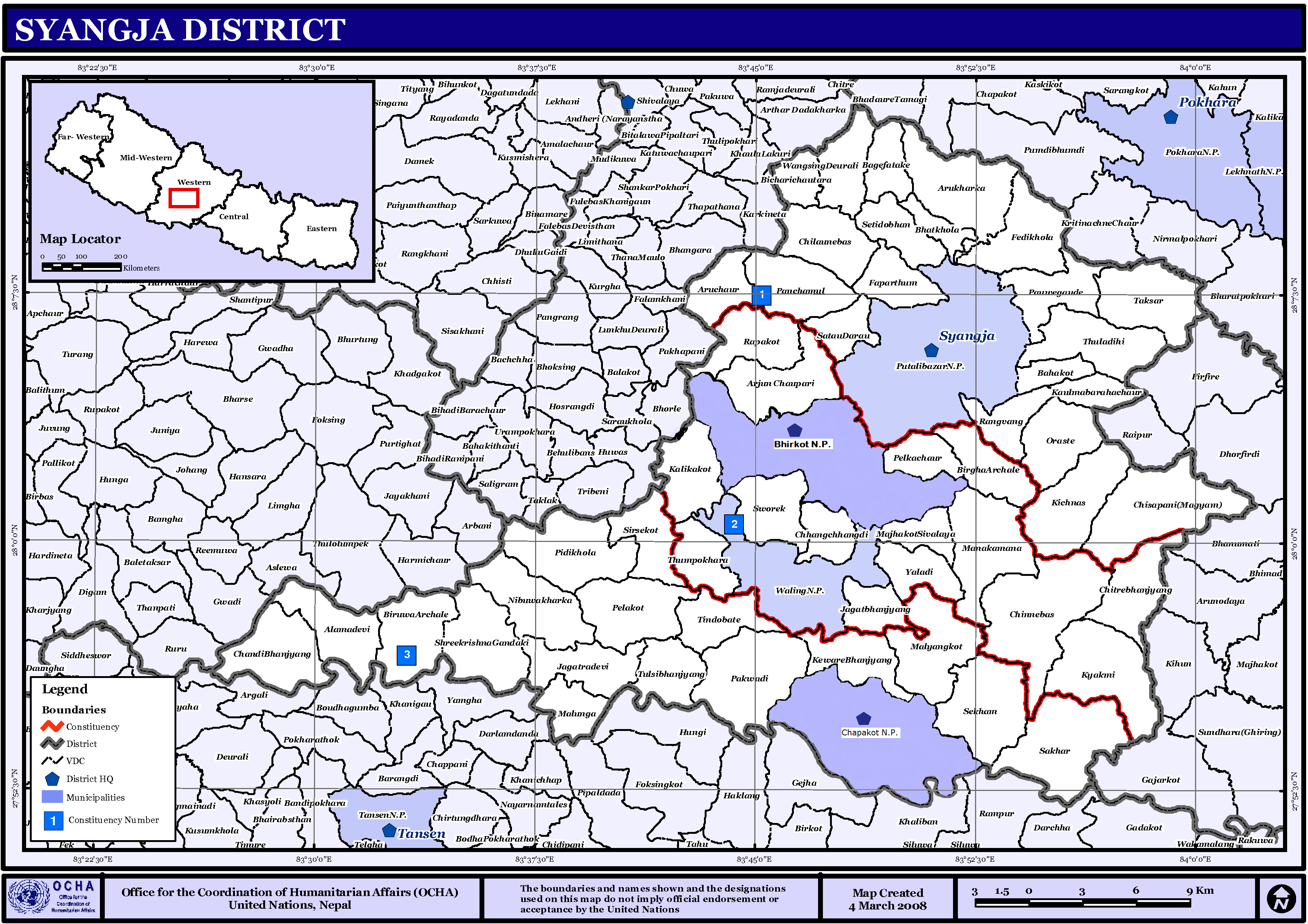

- Location in Nepal Bahakot (Nepal)
- Coordinates: 28.09°N 83.92°E
- Country: Nepal
- Zone: Gandaki Zone
- District: Syangja District

Population (2011)
  - Total: 1,731
- Time zone: UTC+5:45 (Nepal Time)

Bahakot is a village development committee in Syangja District in the Gandaki Zone of central Nepal.

== Population ==
At the time of the 2011 Nepal census it had a population of 1,731 living in 448 households.
