= Sahare, Surkhet =

Coordinates: 28°23′N 81°54′E

Sahare शहरे
- Village Development Committee
- Interactive map of Sahare
- Country: Nepal
- Zone: Bheri Zone
- District: Surkhet District

Population (1991)
  - Total: 7,297
- Time zone: UTC+5:45 (Nepal Time)

Sahare is a Village Development Committee in Surkhet District in the Bheri Zone of mid-western Nepal. At the time of the 1991 Nepal census it had a population of 7297 people residing in 1318 individual households.
