= Chingad Rural Municipality =

Rural municipality in Karnali Province, Nepal

Chingad (Nepali: चिङ्गाड गाउँपालिका) is a rural municipality located in Surkhet District of Karnali Province of Nepal.

== Demographics ==
At the time of the 2011 Nepal census, Chingad Rural Municipality had a population of 17,275. Of these, 96.0% spoke Nepali, 3.8% Magar and 0.1% other languages as their first language.

In terms of ethnicity/caste, 64.6% were Chhetri, 12.4% Kami, 8.6% Magar, 4.0% Damai/Dholi, 3.9% Sarki, 3.0% Hill Brahmin, 1.8% Thakuri, 1.3% Gurung, 0.2% Badi, 0.1% Sanyasi/Dasnami and 0.2% others.

In terms of religion, 98.0% were Hindu, 1.2% Christian, 0.7% Buddhist and 0.1% others.

In terms of literacy, 62.1% could read and write, 2.2% could only read and 35.6% could neither read nor write.
