= Simta Rural Municipality =

Rural municipality in Karnali Province, Nepal

Simta (Nepali: सिम्ता गाउँपालिका) is a rural municipality located in Surkhet District of Karnali Province of Nepal.

== Demographics ==
At the time of the 2011 Nepal census, 99.9% of the population in Simta Rural Municipality spoke Nepali and 0.1% spoke other languages as their first language.

In terms of ethnicity/caste, 40.5% were Chhetri, 20.6% Kami, 16.1% Thakuri, 8.7% Magar, 5.5% Damai/Dholi, 3.3% Sanyasi/Dasnami, 1.8% Hill Brahmin, 1.6% Badi, 1.2% Sarki, 0.2% Gaine, 0.2% Lohar, 0.1% Gurung, 0.1% other Terai and 0.2% others.

In terms of religion, 99.2% were Hindu and 0.8% Christian.

In terms of literacy, 65.8% could read and write, 3.6% could only read and 30.6% could neither read nor write.
