= Taksar, Syangja =

Taksar, Gandaki टक्सार
- Village development committee
- Location in Nepal Taksar, Gandaki (Nepal)
- Coordinates: 28.12°N 83.97°E
- Country: Nepal
- Zone: Gandaki Zone
- District: Syangja District

Population (2011)
  - Total: 2,061
- Time zone: UTC+5:45 (Nepal Time)

VDC Map of Syangja District

Taksar is a village development committee in Syangja District in the Gandaki Zone of central Nepal. At the time of the 2011 Nepal census it had a population of 2,061 people living in 529 individual households. It is very beautiful landscape. There is the variety of ethnic groups. Taksar is only one VDC in Syangja district that borders with two districts Kaski and Tanahun.
