= Barahatal Rural Municipality =

Rural municipality in Karnali Province, Nepal

Barahatal (Nepali: बराहताल गाउँपालिका) is a rural municipality located in Surkhet District of Karnali Province of Nepal.

== Demographics ==
At the time of the 2011 Nepal census, Barahatal Rural Municipality had a population of 18,083. Of these, 87.5% spoke Nepali, 10.8% Magar, 1.0% Raji, 0.2% Gurung, 0.1% Maithili, 0.1% Newar and 0.1% other languages as their first language.

In terms of ethnicity/caste, 30.3% were Magar, 24.6% Chhetri, 22.5% Kami, 5.0% Damai/Dholi, 4.5% Hill Brahmin, 4.0% Thakuri, 2.9% Gurung, 2.2% Sanyasi/Dasnami, 1.2% Raji, 1.1% Sarki, 0.5% Kumal, 0.4% Badi, 0.3% Newar, 0.1% Rajdhob, 0.1% other Terai and 0.2% others.

In terms of religion, 84.2% were Hindu, 11.1% Buddhist, 4.4% Christian and 0.2% others.

In terms of literacy, 65.8% could read and write, 4.9% could only read and 29.2% could neither read nor write.
