= Surkhet District =

Coordinates: 28°36′N 81°38′E

Surkhet District सुर्खेत जिल्ला
- District of Nepal
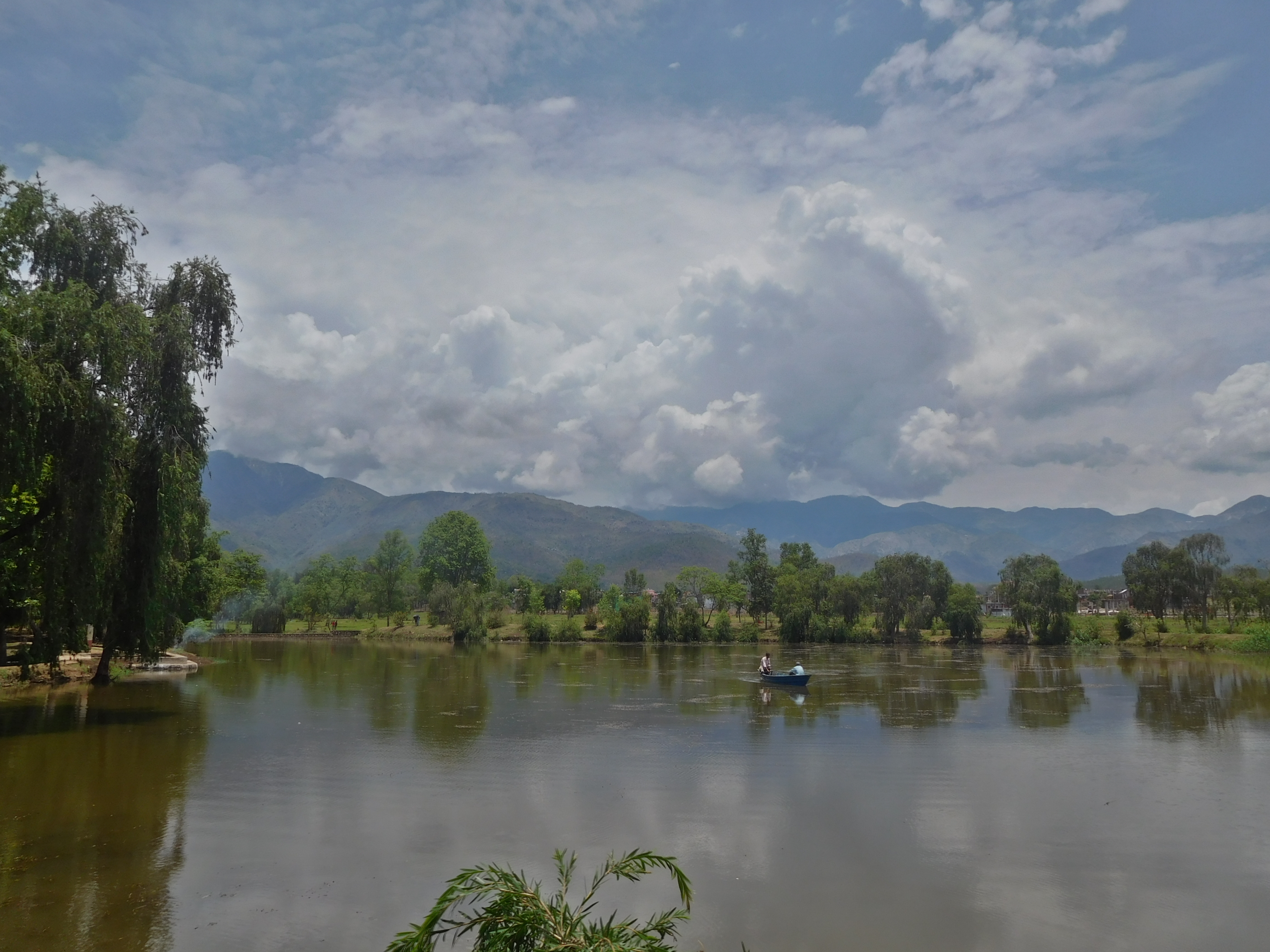
- Bulbule Lake

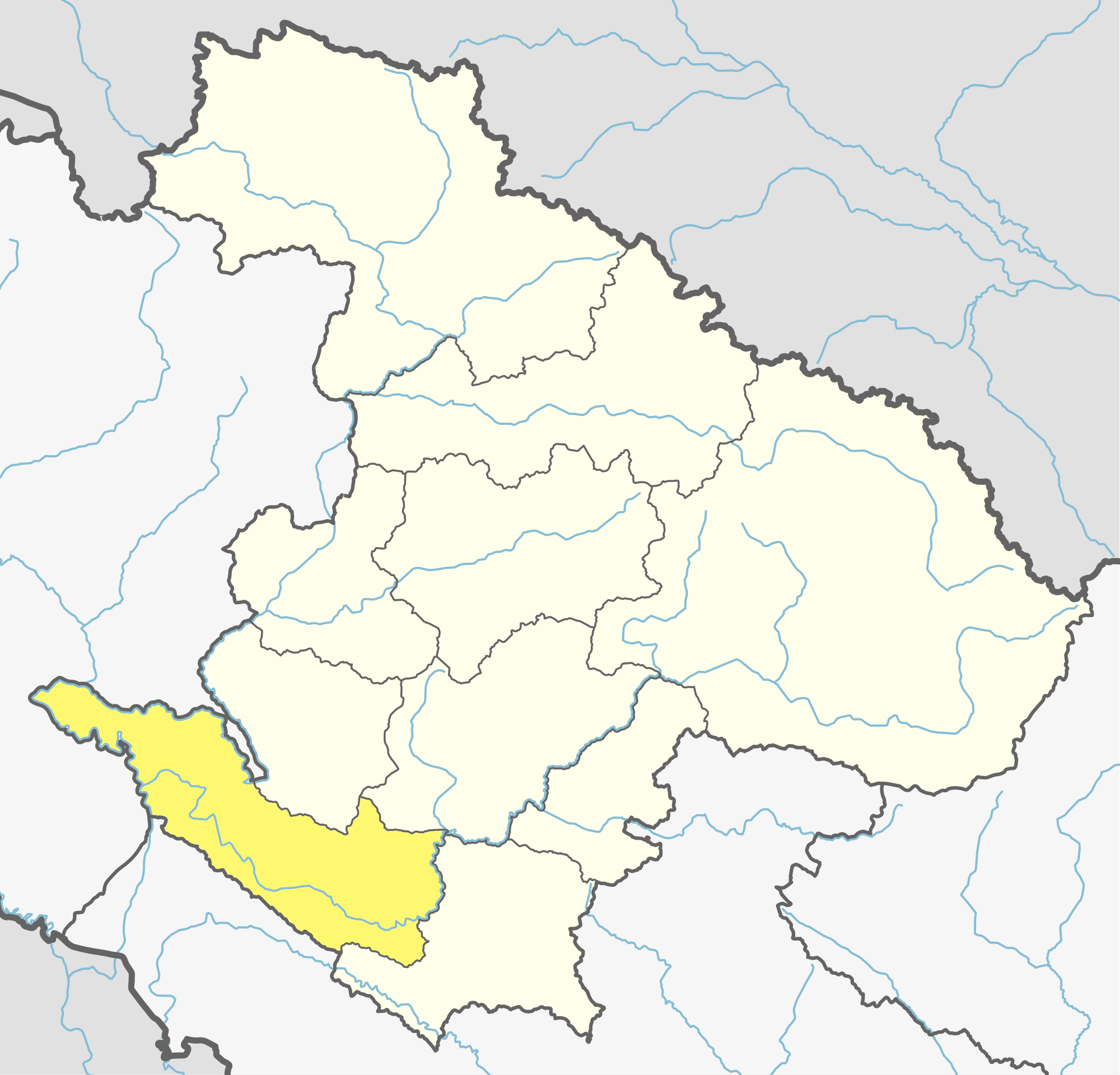
- Location of Surkhet District (dark yellow) in Karnali
- Country: Nepal
- Province: Karnali
- Admin HQ.: Birendranagar

Government
  - Type: Coordination committee
  - Body: DCC, Surkhet

Area
  - Total: 2,451 km^{2} (946 sq mi)

Population (2021)
  - Total: 417,776
  - Density: 170.5/km^{2} (441.5/sq mi)
- Time zone: UTC+05:45 (NPT)
- Postal Codes: 21700
- Telephone Code: 083
- Main Language(s): Nepali
- Website: www.ddcsurkhet.gov.np

Surkhet District (Nepali: सुर्खेत जिल्ला,) is a district in Karnali Province of mid-western and one of the seventy-seven districts of Nepal. Surkhet is one of the ten districts of Karnali located about 600 kilometres (373 mi) west of the national capital Kathmandu. The district's area is 2,489 square kilometres (961 sq mi). It had 288,527 population in 2001 and 350,804 in 2011 which male comprised 169,461 and female 181,381. Its district headquarters, Birendranagar, is the capital of Karnali Province. It serves as a business hub and document center for Karnali province. According to population, development, road links, landforms, climate, many peoples are migrating here.

== Geography and climate ==
Surkhet Valley is one of the Inner Terai Valleys of Nepal. It borders Achham district of Sudurpashchim, Dailekh and Jajarkot districts to the north, Salyan district to the east, Banke and Bardiya districts of Lumbini and Kailali of Sudurpaschim to the south, and Doti district of Sudurpaschim to the west. All boundaries of Surkhet district by the river there are Bheri and Karnali Rivers. It's a beautiful city.

Climate Zone	Elevation Range	% of Area
Lower Tropical	below 300 meters (1,000 ft)	2.2%
Upper Tropical	300 to 1,000 meters 1,000 to 3,300 ft.	61.9%
Subtropical	1,000 to 2,000 meters 3,300 to 6,600 ft.	32.8%
Temperate	2,000 to 3,000 meters 6,400 to 9,800 ft.	1.3%

Unlike the cold weather of the Karnali mountain region and hot weather of the Outer Terai region, Surkhet has a more moderate climate. Winter temperatures drop to about 5 °C and in summer it goes up to 38 °C. Monsoon brings sufficient rainfall during the rainy season. Surkhet ranks low in overall change in climatic condition. 42% covers with plain fertile land and 43% of Mahabharat Range. Rest in Siwalik range rich in forest resource.

== History ==
Before its own identity as an independent district, it used to be in the district of Dailekh. Surkhet is hub to remoter districts like Kalikot, Jumla, Mugu, Jajarkot, and Salyan. Recently because of the Maoist insurgency which ended in 2008, many people have migrated to Surkhet from these districts. for various purposes population are attracted towards this valley.

== Education ==
Adult literacy of 73.1%.

Some notable government educational institutions:

- Mid-West University (MU)
- Surkhet Multiple Campus (TU)
- Shree Krishna Sanskrit Tatha Sadharan secondary school
- Amar Jyoti model secondary School, Neware
- Shiva secondary school, Latikoili
- Bhairab Secondary School Awalching,
- Malika Secondary School Matela
- Janta Secondary School Ranibas
- Sarswati Secondary School Pamka
- Indreni Secondary School Gogne
- Ne Ra Secondary School Kadaghuwani
- Ne ra Secondary School Dhaulachakhachaur
- Jana model secondary School, Birendranagar
- Tripureshwor Secondary School Dhodekhali
- Shree Nepal Rastriya Secondary School, Birendranagar surkhet

== Demographics ==
Historical population
Census year	Pop.	±% p.a.
1981	166,196	—
1991	225,768	+3.11%
2001	288,527	+2.48%
2011	350,804	+1.97%
2021	417,776	+1.76%
Source: Citypopulation

At the time of the 2021 Nepal census, Surkhet District had a population of 415,126. 8.86% of the population is under 5 years of age. It has a literacy rate of 82.71% and a sex ratio of 1078 females per 1000 males. 317,831 (76.56%) lived in municipalities.

Castes/ethnic groups in Surkhet district (2021)
1. Chhetri (31.7%)
2. Kami (18.1%)
3. Magar (17.3%)
4. Bahun (12.2%)
5. Thakuri (6.45%)
6. Damai (4.30%)
7. Sarki (2.23%)
8. Tharu (1.90%)
9. Gurung (1.30%)
10. Dasnami (1.16%)
11. Other Hill Janjati (1.23%)
12. Others (2.08%)

Khas people make up a majority of the population with 77% of the population. Chhetris are the largest caste with 32% of the population, while Khas Dalits make up 25% of the population. Hill Janjatis make up 19% of the population, of which Magars are 17% of the population. There is a small population of Tharus in the inner Terai valleys.

Languages of Surkhet district (2021)
1. Nepali (92.1%)
2. Magar Dhut (4.05%)
3. Tharu (1.73%)
4. Others (2.08%)

At the time of the 2021 census, 92.14% of the population spoke Nepali, 4.05% Magar and 1.73% Tharu as their first language. In 2011, 89.7% of the population spoke Nepali as their first language.

Religion in Surkhet District (2021)
Religion	Percent
Hinduism	91.60%
Buddhism	4.07%
Christianity	3.54%
Islam	0.60%
Other or not stated	0.19%

== Infrastructure ==
Surkhet is accessible by air service and roads from various parts of the country. districts not having road links uses airservices for travelling. Ratna highway links it to the rest of Nepal. Karnali Highway, recently constructed and being black topped, it will link Surkhet to the remote Western Karnali region. Surkhet Airport in Birendranagar has regular and scheduled flights to Kathmandu, Nepalgunj, Jumla and other districts. The Karnali districts are connected through regular domestic flights. Thousands of hotels, inns and lodges are available during a stay at Birendranagar, the capital of Karnali Province.

Mid-western University started 2010 in Birendranagar and offers 18 variable master's degree courses as well as 24 bachelor courses. It is one of the newest educational institute upgrading in recent years. Three colleges offer education up to Master's level. There are many 10+2 schools teaching science, management, humanities, rural development, education etc. Other institutions offer technical education such as veterinary, overseer, computer assistant, assistant health worker and ANM.

There is a regional hospital in Kalagaun. Nepal Red Cross Society, Surkhet Eye Hospital is main eye care service provider which is located at Budhapath in Birendranagar Municipality in Surkhet. There are many NGOs and INGOs working in this area for development. The INF Surkhet Programme is one of the oldest organizations working in the health and development sector. There are other INGOs like GTZ, DFID, DANIDA, USAID, Oxfam, and the BlinkNow Foundation.

== Tourism ==
Tourist attractions are places like Kakrebihar temple, Bulbule Lake, Deutibajai temple, Mangalgadhi, Gothikanda, Ghantaghar, Bheri river and others with religious as well as historic value. Kakrebihar is the remains of an old Buddhist Monastery (palace), which is in the list of national heritage sites in Nepal. Bheri river is a common destination for rafting and paragliding has been recently started in Surkhet. Birendranagar is one of Nepal's few cities built under a master plan. It is popularly known as the "Gateway to Karnali". Rara (biggest lake of Nepal), Shey phoksundo lake, five religious sites inside Dailekh, Kubinde lake (Salyan) and several terrains can be taken into account through roadway Ratna Highway (named after Queen Ratna Rajya laxmi devi Shah) and Jumla Highway. Surkhet is open to Tourist connecting way to Kailash Mansarowar Tibet through Flights and helicopter charter from Nepalgunj or roadway Surkhet. Shortest fasttrack of Nepal that connects Chinese and Indian border is under construction.

=== Kakrebihar ===
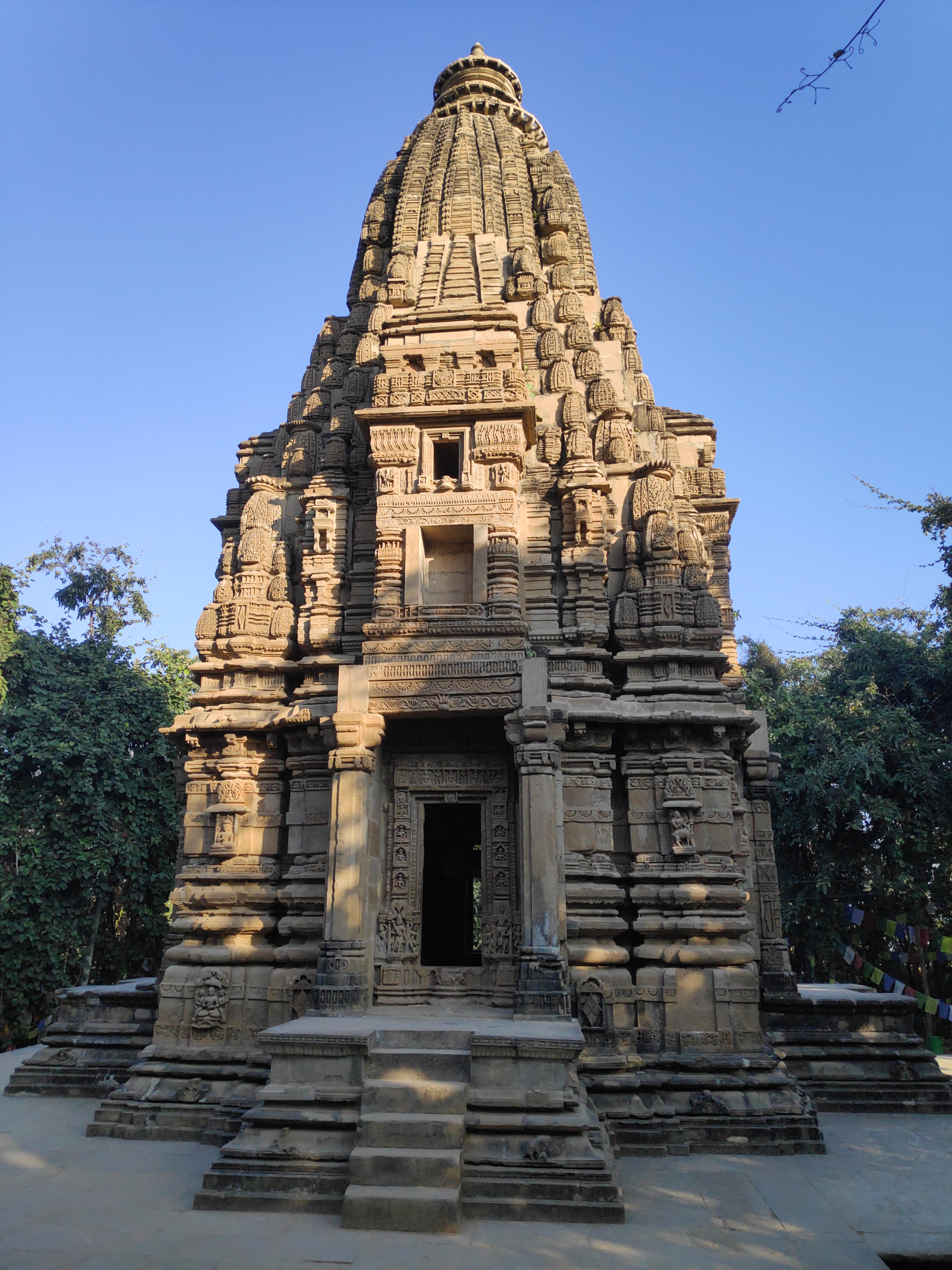
Kakre Bihar Temple in 2022

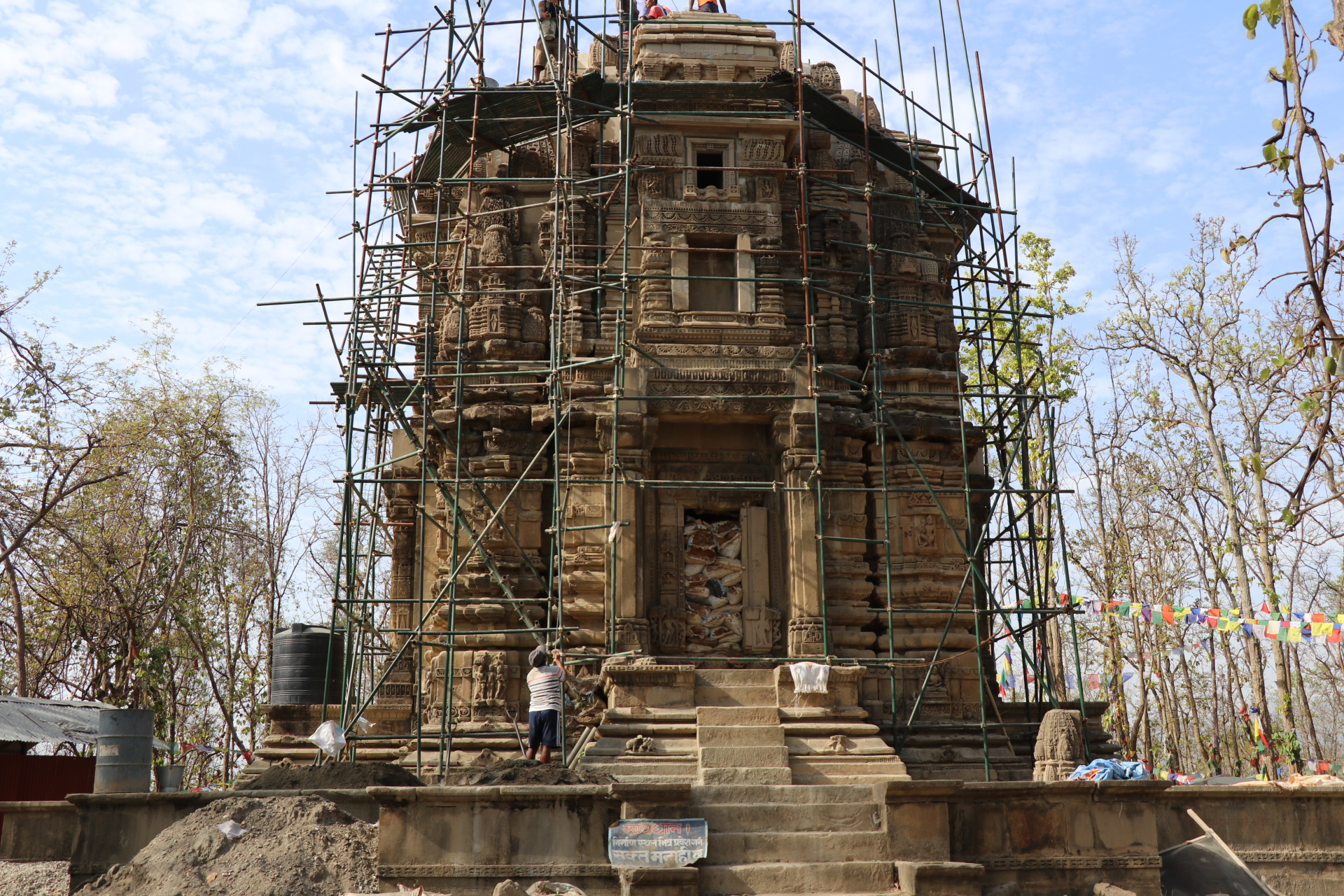
Kakrebihar Temple

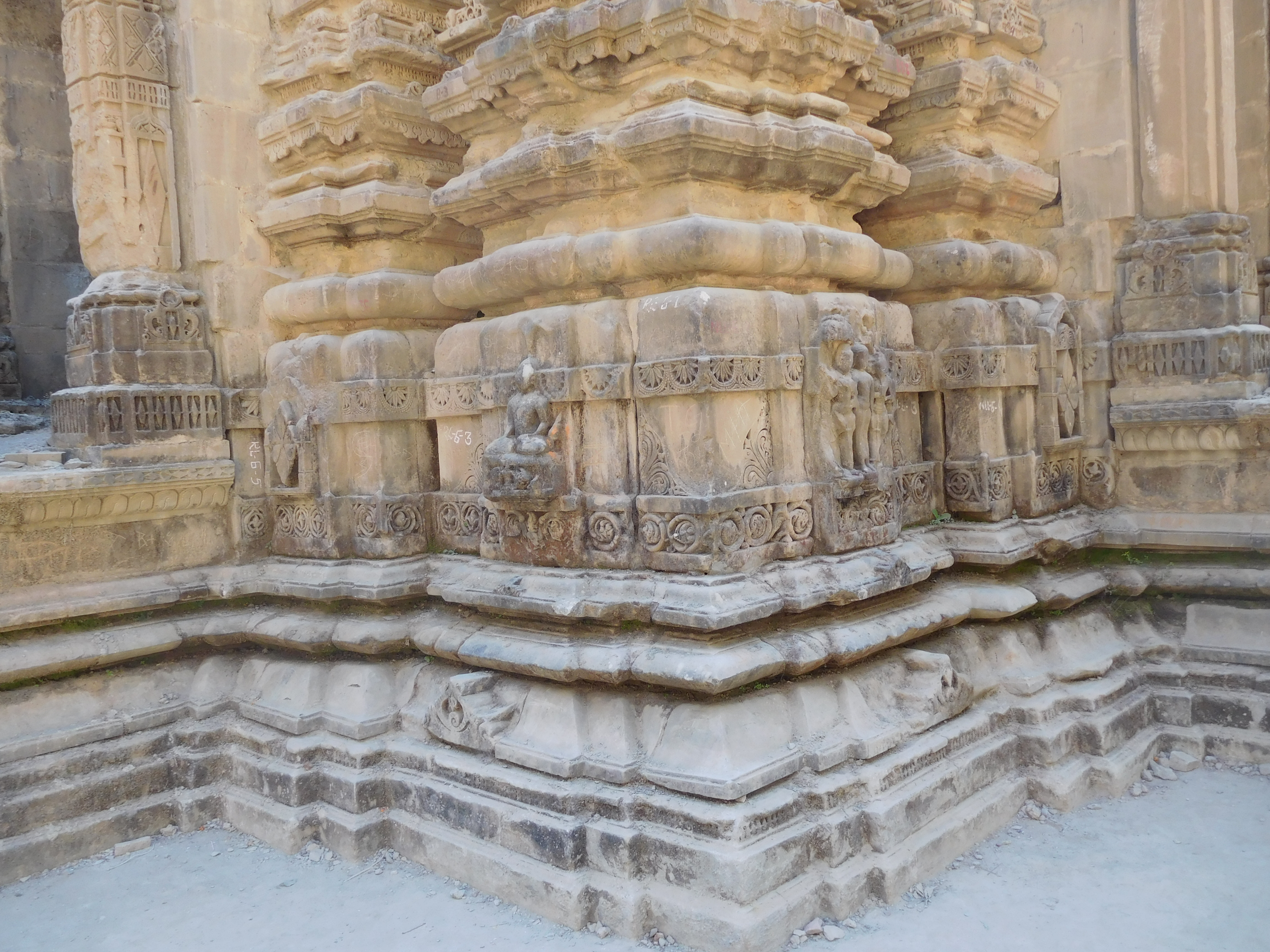
Stone carving of Kakrebihar Temple

Kakrebihar (Nepali: काक्रेबिहार) is a Shikhara Buddhist temple in Birendranagar, Surkhet, Karnali Province. It was built in the 12th century and it spreads over 180 hectares of land. The temple was restored in September 2021.

== Division ==
On 10 March 2017 Government of Nepal restricted old administrative structures and announced 744 new local level units as per the new constitution of Nepal 2015, thus cancelled all Village development committees and introduce Gaupalika (Rural municipality) and some new urban municipalities with the old urban municipalities (made some changes in area of old municipalities).

According to new structure Surkhet district divided into five municipality (urban) and four rural municipalities:

No.	Municipality	Rural municipality	Official web
1	Birendranagar	Chaukune	Birendranagar Chaukune
2	Bheriganga	Barahatal	Bheriganga Barahatal
3	Gurbhakot	Chingad	Gurbhakot Chingad
4	Panchapuri	Simta	Panchapuri Simta
5	Lekbesi		Lekbesi

== See also ==
- Fapla International Cricket Ground
- Pokhara International Cricket Stadium
- Girija Prasad Koirala Cricket Stadium
- Gautam Buddha International Cricket Stadium
- Mulpani International Cricket Ground
- Tribhuvan University International Cricket Ground
- Mulpani Cricket Stadium
- Extra Tech Oval Cricket Stadium
