= Bardiya 2 =

Parliamentary constituency in Nepal

- Parliamentary constituency
- Bardiya 2 in Lumbini Province
- Province: Lumbini Province
- District: Bardiya District

Current constituency
- Created: 1991
- Party: Rastriya Swatantra Party
- Member of Parliament: Shreedhar Pokharel

Bardiya 2 one of two parliamentary constituencies of Bardiya District in Nepal. This constituency came into existence on the Constituency Delimitation Commission (CDC) report submitted on 31 August 2017.

== Incorporated areas ==
Bardiya 2 incorporates Geruwa Rural Municipality, Rajapur Municipality, Thakurbaba Municipality, Madhuwan Municipality and, wards 1–3 of Barbardiya Municipality.

== Assembly segments ==
It encompasses the following Lumbini Provincial Assembly segment

- Bardiya 2(A)
- Bardiya 2(B)

== Members of Parliament ==
=== Parliament/Constituent Assembly ===
Election	Member	Party
1991	Khag Raj Sharma	CPN (Unified Marxist–Leninist)
1994	Shyam Prasad Dhakal	CPN (Unified Marxist–Leninist)
1999	Mangal Prasad Tharu	Nepali Congress
2008	Bishnu Prasad Chaudhary	CPN (Maoist)
January 2009	Bishnu Prasad Chaudhary	UCPN (Maoist)
2013	Sanjay Kumar Gautam	Nepali Congress
2017	Sant Kumar Tharu	CPN (Maoist Centre)
May 2018	Sant Kumar Tharu	Nepal Communist Party
2022	Lalbir Chaudhary	Independent
2026	Shreedhar Pokharel	Rastriya Swatantra Party

=== Provincial Assembly ===
==== 2(A) ====
Election	Member	Party
2017	Kul Prasad Pokharel	CPN (Unified Marxist-Leninist)
May 2018	Kul Prasad Pokharel	Nepal Communist Party

==== 2(B) ====
Election	Member	Party
2017	Dipesh Tharu	CPN (Maoist Centre)
May 2018	Dipesh Tharu	Nepal Communist Party

== Election results ==
=== Election in the 2020s ===
==== 2026 general election ====
Candidate	Party	Votes	%
Shreedhar Pokharel	Rastriya Swatantra Party	29,678	33.68
Kishor Singh Rathore	Nepali Congress	20,402	23.15
Suresh Pantha	Nepali Communist Party	19,180	21.76
Bimala B.K.	CPN (UML)	10,772	12.22
Dharma Bahadur Chaudhary	Ujyaalo Nepal Party	4,472	5.07
Others		3,626	4.11
Total		88,130	100.00
Valid votes		88,130	95.15
Invalid/blank votes		4,488	4.85
Total votes		92,618	100.00
Registered voters/turnout		155,232	59.66
Majority		9,276	
Rastriya Swatantra Party gain			

==== 2022 general election ====
Candidate	Party	Votes	%
Lalbir Chaudhary	Independent	26,520	30.55
Suresh Pantha	CPN (Maoist Centre)	26,384	30.39
Pankaj Singh Rathore	CPN (UML)	16,090	18.53
Binay Rawal	Rastriya Prajatantra Party	13,292	15.31
Om Prakash Basaula	Rastriya Swatantra Party	3,891	4.48
Others		635	0.73
Total		86,812	100.00
Majority		136	
Independent gain			

=== Election in the 2010s ===
==== 2017 legislative elections ====
Party	Candidate	Votes
CPN (Maoist Centre)	Sant Kumar Tharu	50,555
Nepali Congress	Gopal Dahit	36,735
Others		1,310
Invalid votes		2,689
Result	Maoist Centre gain	
Source: Election Commission

==== 2017 Nepalese provincial elections ====
===== 2(A) =====
Party	Candidate	Votes
CPN (Unified Marxist–Leninist)	Kul Prasad Pokharel	28,323
Nepali Congress	Ram Chandra Thapa	17,402
Others		875
Invalid votes		1,274
Result	CPN (UML) gain	
Source: Election Commission

===== 2(B) =====
Party	Candidate	Votes
CPN (Maoist Centre)	Dipesh Tharu	23,632
Nepali Congress	Nachuram Chaudhary	17,912
Others		713
Invalid votes		1,137
Result	Maoist Centre gain	
Source: Election Commission

==== 2013 Constituent Assembly election ====
Party	Candidate	Votes
Nepali Congress	Sanjay Kumar Gautam	11,618
CPN (Unified Marxist–Leninist)	Purna Sharma	10,242
UCPN (Maoist)	Tilak Ram Sharma	8,595
Madhesi Janaadhikar Forum, Nepal (Democratic)	Ram Kumar Tharu	5,003
Sadbhavana Party	Dhanesh Kumar Yadav	2,269
Rastriya Prajatantra Party Nepal	Nasuriddin Sheikh	1,587
Others		4,549
Result	Congress gain	
Source: NepalNews

=== Election in the 2000s ===
==== 2008 Constituent Assembly election ====
Party	Candidate	Votes
CPN (Maoist)	Bishnu Prasad Chaudhary	17,851
Nepali Congress	Sanjay Kumar Gautam	7,605
Sadbhavana Party	Ram Kumar Tharu	7,317
CPN (Unified Marxist–Leninist)	Shyam Prasad Dhakal	5,189
CPN (Marxist–Leninist)	Bhim Bahadur K.C.	2,065
Rastriya Prajatantra Party	Rais Ahmed Shiekh	1,716
Others		3,420
Invalid votes		1,902
Result	Maoist gain	
Source: Election Commission

=== Election in the 1990s ===
==== 1999 legislative elections ====
Party	Candidate	Votes
Nepali Congress	Mangal Prasad Tharu	14,070
Rastriya Prajatantra Party	Pratibha Rana	9,617
CPN (Unified Marxist–Leninist)	Bhim Bahadur K.C.	6,383
CPN (Marxist–Leninist)	Deep Bahadur Rana	6,364
Nepal Sadbhawana Party	Ram Kumar Tharu	5,109
Rastriya Prajatantra Party (Chand)	Rajendra Prasad Shivastav	2,490
Others		757
Invalid votes		1,393
Result	Congress gain	
Source: Election Commission

==== 1994 legislative elections ====
Party	Candidate	Votes
CPN (Unified Marxist–Leninist)	Shyam Prasad Dhakal	11,907
Nepali Congress	Gyan Raj Sharma	8,328
Rastriya Prajatantra Party	Pratibha Sharma	7,356
Nepal Sadbhawana Party	Ram Kumar Tharu	6,600
Others		446
Result	CPN (UML) hold	
Source: Election Commission

==== 1991 legislative elections ====
Party	Candidate	Votes
CPN (Unified Marxist–Leninist)	Khag Raj Sharma	11,247
Nepali Congress		8,769
Result	CPN (UML) gain	

== See also ==
- List of parliamentary constituencies of Nepal
