= Bardiya 1 =

Parliamentary constituency in Lumbini Province, Nepal

- Parliamentary constituency
- Bardiya 1 in Lumbini Province
- Province: Lumbini Province
- District: Bardiya District

Current constituency
- Created: 1991
- Party: Rastriya Swatantra Party
- Member of Parliament: Thakur Singh Tharu

Bardiya 1 one of two parliamentary constituencies of Bardiya District in Nepal. This constituency came into existence on the Constituency Delimitation Commission (CDC) report submitted on 31 August 2017.

== Incorporated areas ==
Bardiya 1 incorporates Bansgadhi Municipality, Badhaiyatal Rural Municipality, Gulariya Municipality and wards 4–11of Barbardiya Municipality.

== Assembly segments ==
It encompasses the following Lumbini Provincial Assembly segment

- Bardiya 1(A)
- Bardiya 1(B)

== Members of Parliament ==
=== Parliament/Constituent Assembly ===
Election	Member	Party
1991	Bam Dev Gautam	CPN (Unified Marxist–Leninist)
March 1998	Bam Dev Gautam	CPN (Marxist–Leninist)
1999	Kashi Paudel	Nepali Congress
2008	Sarala Regmi	CPN (Maoist)
January 2009	Sarala Regmi	UCPN (Maoist)
2013	Bam Dev Gautam	CPN (Unified Marxist–Leninist)
2014 by-election	Shyam Prasad Dhakal	CPN (Unified Marxist–Leninist)
2017 - 2022- 2026	Sanjay Kumar Gautam	Nepali Congress
2026	Thakur Singh Tharu	Rastriya Swatantra Party

=== Provincial Assembly ===
==== 1(A) ====
Election	Member	Party
2017	Kabi Ram Tharu	CPN (Unified Marxist-Leninist)
May 2018	Kabi Ram Tharu	Nepal Communist Party

==== 1(B) ====
Election	Member	Party
2017	Tilak Ram Sharma	CPN (Maoist Centre)
May 2018	Tilak Ram Sharma	Nepal Communist Party

== Election results ==
=== Election in the 2020s ===
==== 2022 general election ====
Candidate	Party	Votes	%
Sanjay Kumar Gautam	Nepali Congress	30,611	31.24
Laxman Raj Gyawali	CPN (UML)	26,155	26.69
Thakur Singh Tharu	Nagrik Unmukti Party	23,993	24.49
Prabesh Bhusal	Rastriya Swatantra Party	11,004	11.23
Sohrab Pathan	Janamat Party	2,355	2.40
Surya Bahadur Singh	Rastriya Prajatantra Party	2,266	2.31
Resham Bahadur Khatri	People's Socialist Party, Nepal	1,000	1.02
Others		597	0.61
Total		97,981	100.00
Majority		4,456	
Nepali Congress hold			

=== Elections in the 2010s ===
==== 2017 legislative elections ====
Party	Candidate	Votes
Nepali Congress	Sanjay Kumar Gautam	44,829
CPN (Unified Marxist–Leninist)	Bam Dev Gautam	44,076
CPN (Marxist–Leninist)	Nar Bahadur Bohora	2,372
Others		2,228
Invalid votes		5,948
Result	Congress gain	
Source: Election Commission

=== 1(A) ===
Party	Candidate	Votes
CPN (Unified Marxist–Leninist)	Kabi Ram Tharu	23,560
Nepali Congress	Sode Bista	21,193
CPN (Marxist–Leninist)	Ramesh Kumar Sharma	1,130
Others		1,455
Invalid votes		2,039
Result	CPN (UML) gain	
Source: Election Commission

=== 1(B) ===
Party	Candidate	Votes
CPN (Maoist Centre)	Tilak Ram Sharma	23,392
Nepali Congress	Mangal Prasad Tharu	20,841
Rastriya Prajatantra Party	Mangare Godiya	1,306
Federal Socialist Forum, Nepal	Krishna Prasad Ahir	1,094
Others		647
Invalid votes		2,664
Result	Maoist Centre gain	
Source: Election Commission

==== 2014 by-elections ====
Candidate	Party	Votes	%
Shyam Prasad Dhakal	CPN (UML)	16,696	40.02
Sode Bista	Nepali Congress	11,355	27.22
Bhuwan Kumar Tharu	UCPN (Maoist)	11,031	26.44
Govinda Prasad Tharu	MJFN (D)	1,596	3.83
Bhim Bahadur Chand	CPN (Marxist–Leninist)	1,041	2.50
Total		41,719	100.00
Valid votes		41,719	100.00
Invalid/blank votes		0	0.00
Total votes		41,719	100.00
Registered voters/turnout		58,443	71.38
Majority		5,341	
CPN (UML) hold			

==== 2013 Constituent Assembly election ====
Party	Candidate	Votes
CPN (Unified Marxist–Leninist)	Bam Dev Gautam	18,347
UCPN (Maoist)	Bhuwan Kumar Tharu	11,628
Nepali Congress	Bhuwaneshwar Chaudhary	8,598
Madhesi Janaadhikar Forum, Nepal (Democratic)	Thakur Singh Tharu	1,174
Others		3,595
Result	CPN (UML) gain	
Source: NepalNews

=== Election in the 2000s ===
==== 2008 Constituent Assembly election ====
Party	Candidate	Votes
CPN (Maoist)	Sarala Regmi	17,955
CPN (Unified Marxist–Leninist)	Bam Dev Gautam	13,773
Nepali Congress	Malati Sodari	6,831
Rastriya Prajatantra Party	Govinda Prasad Tharu	2,324
CPN (Marxist–Leninist)	Nar Bahadur Bohora	1,815
Madhesi Janaadhikar Forum, Nepal	Thakur Singh Tharu	1,340
Others		1,154
Invalid votes		1,163
Result	Maoist gain	
Source: Election Commission

=== Election in the 1990s ===
==== 1999 legislative elections ====
Party	Candidate	Votes
Nepali Congress	Kashi Paudel	17,219
CPN (Marxist–Leninist)	Bam Dev Gautam	13,247
CPN (Unified Marxist–Leninist)	Gobinda Prasad Koirala	10,885
Rastriya Prajatantra Party (Chand)	Gaurav Chand	1,646
Others		2,774
Invalid votes		1,490
Result	Congress gain	
Source: Election Commission

==== 1994 legislative elections ====
Party	Candidate	Votes
CPN (Unified Marxist–Leninist)	Bam Dev Gautam	16,933
Nepali Congress	Phul Ram Tharu	10,949
Rastriya Prajatantra Party	Thakur Singh Tharu	5,757
Result	CPN (UML) hold	
Source: Election Commission

==== 1991 legislative elections ====
Party	Candidate	Votes
CPN (Unified Marxist–Leninist)	Bam Dev Gautam	16,486
Nepali Congress		11,712
Result	CPN (UML) gain	

== See also ==
- List of parliamentary constituencies of Nepal
