= Madhuwan, Bardiya =

Madhuwan Municipality मधुवन
- Municipality
- Location within Lumbini Province Location within Nepal
- Coordinates: 28.292115°N 81.271029°E
- Country: Nepal
- Province: Lumbini Province
- District: Bardiya
- No. of wards: 9
- Established: 2 December 2014
- Incorporated (VDC): Sanoshree, Taratal, Suryapatawa and Dhodhari
- Incorporated (date): 2017

Government
  - Type: Mayor–council
  - Body: Madhuwan Municipality Municipality
  - Mayor: Tej Bahadur Bhat
  - Deputy Mayor: Anita Chaudhary

Area
  - Total: 129.73 km^{2} (50.09 sq mi)

Population (2011)
  - Total: 46,437
  - Density: 357.95/km^{2} (927.09/sq mi)
- Time zone: UTC+05:45 (NPT)
- Website: madhuwanmun.gov.np

Madhuwan (Nepali: मधुवन) is a municipality located in Bardiya District of Lumbini Province of Nepal. It is one of the six municipalities of Bardiya District. The municipality is bordered by Gulariya and Barbardiya in the east, India in the west, and Thakurbaba and Geruwa Rural Municipality in the north. Bardiya National Park is on the northern border of the municipality.

The area of the municipality is 129.73 square kilometres (50.09 sq mi) and the population according to the 2011 Nepal census was 46,437. The municipality is divided into 9 wards.

== Background ==
The municipality was established on 2 December 2014, when the government announced 61 more new municipalities. This new municipality was established merging the two then VDCs, e.g. Sanoshree and Taratal and this new municipality was named Sanoshree Taratal. On 10 March 2017, two more VDCs Suryapatawa and Dhodhari Incorporated with this municipality and renamed it to Madhuwan.

== Demographics ==
At the time of the 2011 Nepal census, Madhuwan Municipality had a population of 46,682. Of these, 52.8% spoke Nepali, 42.2% Tharu, 1.4% Gurung, 1.1% Magar, 0.7% Tamang, 0.7% Raji, 0.2% Hindi, 0.2% Maithili, 0.2% Newar, 0.2% Urdu, 0.1% Awadhi, 0.1% Bhojpuri, and 0.1% other languages as their first language.

In terms of ethnicity/caste, 42.8% were Tharu, 19.3% Chhetri, 9.5% Kami, 8.1% Hill Brahmin, 5.6% Magar, 3.0% Gurung, 2.1% Thakuri, 2.1% Damai/Dholi, 1.5% Sarki, 1.3% Tamang, 1.0% Newar, 0.8% Sanyasi/Dasnami, 0.7% Raji, 0.6% Musalman, 0.4% Badi, 0.2% Gaine, 0.2% Kumal, 0.1% Kalwar, and 0.2% others.

In terms of religion, 92.3% were Hindu, 3.7% Christian, 3.3% Buddhism, and 0.6% Muslim.

In terms of literacy, 67.6% could read and write, 1.6% could only read and 30.8% could neither read nor write.
