= Badhaiyatal Rural Municipality =

Badhaiyatal बढैयाताल गाउँपालिका
- Rural Municipality
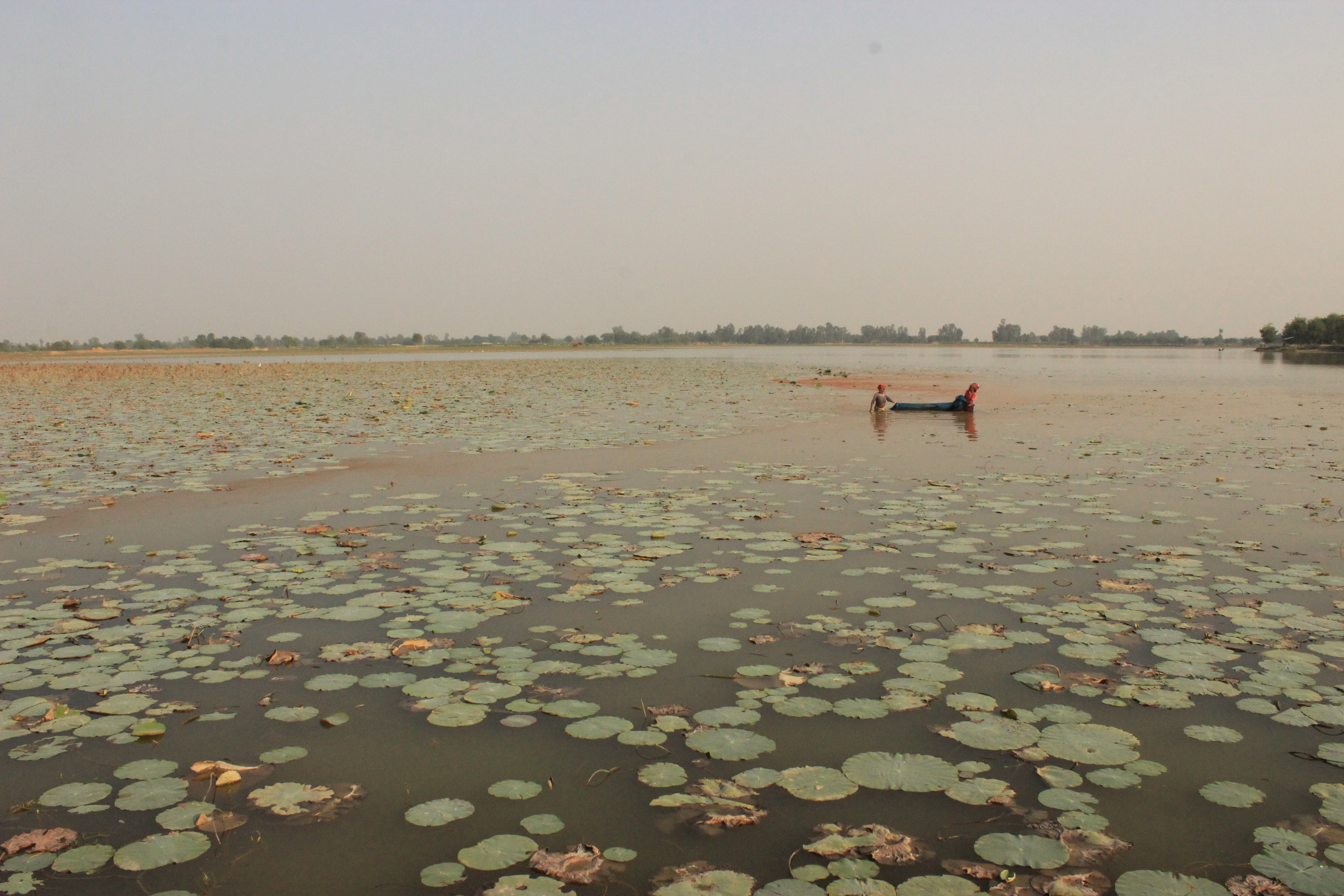

- Location of rural council Badhaiyatal (Nepal)
- Coordinates: 28.19°N 81.48°E
- Country: Nepal
- Province: Lumbini Province
- District: Bardiya
- Wards: 9
- Established: 10 March 2017

Government
  - Type: Rural Council
  - Chairperson: Mr. Himalaya Tripathi (9858024703)
  - Vice-chairperson: Mrs. Laxmi Kumari Adhikari (9864866180)

Area
  - Total: 115.19 km^{2} (44.48 sq mi)

Population (2011)
  - Total: 47,868
  - Rank: 7th (Nepal)
  - Density: 415.56/km^{2} (1,076.3/sq mi)
- Time zone: UTC+5:45 (Nepal Standard Time)
- Headquarter: Mainapokhar
- Website: badhaiyatalmun.gov.np

Badhaiyatal (Nepali: बढैयाताल) is a rural municipality located in Bardiya District of Lumbini Province of Nepal.

The rural municipality came into existence on 10 March 2017 when the government of Nepal decided to dissolve the old administrative structure and reconstruct a new administrative division.

Jamuni, Sorhawa, Manpur Mainapokhar and Kalika VDCs were merged to form this new rural municipality. The rural municipality divided into 9 wards and Mainapokhar declared headquarter of the rural municipality. Total population of the municipality is 47868 individuals according to the 2011 Nepal census. Total area of the council is calculated 115.19 square kilometres (44.48 sq mi).

== Demographics ==
At the time of the 2011 Nepal census, Badhaiyatal Rural Municipality had a population of 47,948. Of these, 49.9% spoke Nepali, 36.7% Tharu, 7.4% Awadhi, 2.4% Urdu, 1.3% Magar, 0.5% Gurung, 0.5% Newar, 0.5% Hindi, 0.4% Maithili, 0.3% Tamang and 0.1% other languages as their first language.

In terms of ethnicity/caste, 37.4% were Tharu, 12.3% Hill Brahmin, 12.2% Chhetri, 11.4% Kami, 5.4% Magar, 2.8% Musalman, 2.7% Damai/Dholi, 2.6% Thakuri, 2.0% Yadav, 1.6% Chamar/Harijan/Ram, 1.3% Sarki, 1.1% Gurung, 1.1% Newar, 0.8% other Dalit, 0.7% Sanyasi/Dasnami, 0.6% Dusadh/Paswan/Pasi, 0.6% Kurmi, 0.5% Tamang, 0.3% Dhobi, 0.2% Terai Brahmin, 0.2% Gaine, 0.2% Gharti/Bhujel, 0.2% Hajjam/Thakur, 0.2% Kathabaniyan, 0.2% Kayastha, 0.2% Rajbanshi, 0.2% other Terai, 0.1% Badi, 0.1% Darai, 0.1% Halwai, 0.1% Kalwar, 0.1% Kanu, 0.1% Kumal, 0.1% Lohar, 0.1% Majhi, 0.1% Rai, 0.1% Teli and 0.1% others.

In terms of religion, 92.7% were Hindu, 2.8% Muslim, 2.6% Christian, 1.7% Buddhist and 0.2% others.

In terms of literacy, 66.3% could read and write, 2.3% could only read and 31.4% could neither read nor write.

== See also ==
- Bardiya District
- Lumbini Province
