= Geruwa Rural Municipality =

Rural Municipality in Lumbini Province, Nepal

Geruwa गेरुवा गाउँपालिका
- Rural Municipality
- Location of rural council Geruwa (Nepal)
- Coordinates: 28.47585°N 81.192614°E
- Country: Nepal
- Province: Lumbini Province
- District: Bardiya
- Wards: 6
- Established: 10 March 2017

Government
  - Type: Rural Council
  - Chairperson: Mr. Jaman Singh KC
  - Vice-chairperson: Mrs. Laxmi Chaudhary

Area
  - Total: 78.41 km^{2} (30.27 sq mi)

Population (2011)
  - Total: 0
  - Density: 0.0/km^{2} (0.0/sq mi)
- Time zone: UTC+5:45 (Nepal Standard Time)
- Headquarter: Pashupatinagar
- Website: geruwamun.gov.np

Geruwa (Nepali: गेरुवा) is a rural municipality located in Bardiya District of Lumbini Province of Nepal.

The rural municipality came into existence on 10 March 2017 when the government of Nepal decided to dissolve the old administrative structure and reconstruct a new administrative division.

Patabhar, Gola, Pashupatinagar and Manau VDCs were merged to form this new rural municipality. The rural municipality is divided into 6 wards and Pashupatinagar was declared headquarter of the rural municipality. The total population of the municipality is 34871 individuals according to Nepal census 2011. Total area of this council is 78.41 square kilometres (30.27 sq mi).

== Demographics ==
At the time of the 2011 Nepal census, Geruwa Rural Municipality had a population of 34,885. Of these, 63.2% spoke Tharu, 35.5% Nepali, 0.8% Sonaha, 0.1% Newar, 0.1% Hindi, 0.1% Maithili, 0.1% Magar and 0.1% Doteli as their first language.

In terms of ethnicity/caste, 64.4% were Tharu, 13.8% Chhetri, 7.9% Hill Brahmin, 4.4% Thakuri, 4.2% Kami, 2.0% Damai/Dholi, 0.8% Magar, 0.6% Lohar, 0.5% Newar, 0.4% Sanyasi/Dasnami, 0.3% Badi, 0.3% Gurung, 0.2% Sarki, 0.1% Kumal, 0.1% Musalman, 0.1% other Terai and 0.1% others.

In terms of religion, 98.4% were Hindu, 1.4% Christian, 0.1% Muslim and 0.1% Buddhist.

In terms of literacy, 65.8% could read and write, 0.9% could only read and 33.2% could neither read nor write.

== See also ==
- Bardiya District
- Lumbini Province
