= Manpur Tapara =

Coordinates: 28°24′0.61″N 81°9′23.37″E

Manpur Tapara मानपुर टपरा
- Location in Lumbini Province Manpur Tapara (Nepal)
- Country: Nepal
- Zone: Bheri Zone
- District: Bardiya District

Population (1991)
  - Total: 7,387
- Time zone: UTC+5:45 (Nepal Time)

Manpur Tapara is a town and marketplace in Rajapur Municipality in Bardiya District in the Bheri Zone of south-western Nepal. The former village development committee (VDC) was merged with Daulatpur, Naya Gaun, Badalpur, Bhimapur and Rajapur VDCs to form the new municipality on 18 May 2014. It is almost at the centre of river island called Bhawara Tappu of Karnali River.

Badalpur village development committee (VDC) lies north of Manpur Tapara. Manau VDC lies northeast, Khairi Chandanpur VDC lies east and southeast, Bhimapur VDC lies south and southwest and Rajapur VDC lies west of Manpur Tapara. Although Manpur Tapara VDC does not touch international border between Nepal and India, it lies just half a kilometer north of International Border at Ishworiganj in Bhimapur VDC. Manpur Tapara is a plain fertile land in the western part of Bardiya district. It is an agricultural land with a well-developed irrigation system. Almost all of the VDC is connected with agricultural canals. More than 2500 hectares of land can be irrigated with these canals. These sophisticated irrigation canals were developed by Tharu people in the past using simple tools. The main source of water in these canals is the Maila Nala, which itself is a branch of Geruwa branch of Karnali river. Rice, wheat, maize, mustard and lentils are the major crops cultivated in Manpur Tapara.

Karnali river brings heavy sediments during monsoon season and deposits in the canal beds and the field every year. Every year more than 2500 farmers contribute their muscle power to dig and clear the sediment deposits in the canal bed. Previously, it required more than two months of work to control the amount of water coming into Maila Nala from Geruwa. Every year earthen dam used to be reconstructed or repaired. Material used in the dam were, non compacted slab of soil called chapari or chyapa, branches of trees and cobbles and boulders. Thanks to the Rajapur Irrigation Project which constructed concrete dams. It also constructed many aqueducts, head and cross regulaters and off-sets at different locations in the canal system.

Manpur Tapara used to be covered with agricultural land some forest and it had a small population of indigenous Tharu people just 50 years back. During the late 1940s and 1950s more Tharu people migrated from Dang valley and Deukhuri valley in the east. These people speak their own language which is called Tharu language. Their culture is unique and it is different from pahadiya people. Before 45 years, it had a very less population of Pahadi people. At present, there is a significant number of Pahadi population. At the time of the 1991 Nepal census it had a population of 7,387 and had 842 houses in the town. According to the Central Bureau of Statistics, Nepal, in 2001 it had a total population of 9495 in which male population of 4738 and female population of 4757. Total number of households were 1307.

List of villages in Manpur Tapara are Tapara, Mahuwa, Kunia, Mahadeuli, Sohali (Soili), Kohali (Koili), Puraina, Ostajpur, Bhokpur, Saduwa, Jamunabojhi, Banjaritanda, Bikrampur, Shreepur, Udaypur, Jogipur, and Jhapti.
