= Shreedhar Pokharel =

Nepalese politician

Honourable Shreedhar Pokharel
- श्रीधर पोखरेल

Member of Parliament, Pratinidhi Sabha
- Incumbent
- Assumed office 26 March 2026
- Preceded by: Lalbir Chaudhary
- Constituency: Bardiya 2

Personal details
- Born: 17 April 1972 (age 54) Thakurbaba, Bardiya, Nepal
- Citizenship: Nepalese
- Party: Rastriya Swatantra Party (2025 – present)
- Other political affiliations: Nepali Congress (1990-2025)
- Spouse: Kiran Sharma
- Children: 2
- Parents: Lumakant Pokharel (father); Chetukala Poudel (mother)
- Profession: Politician

Shreedhar Pokharel (Nepali: श्रीधर पोखरेल) is a Nepalese politician serving as a member of parliament from the Rastriya Swatantra Party. He was elected to the Pratinidhi Sabha, the lower house of the Federal Parliament of Nepal from Bardiya 2 Parliamentary constituency in the 2026 Nepalese General Election. He secured 29,678 votes and defeated his closest contender, Kishor Singh Rathore of the Nepali Congress.

== Early and personal life ==
Pokharel was born in Thakurbaba, Bardiya, Nepal, on April 17, 1972. He was born to Lumakant Pokharel and Chetukala Poudel. He is married to Kiran Sharma and has two children. He is a student of law.

== Politics ==
He started his political career by joining the Nepal Student Union, the student wing of Nepali Congress in 1990. His long political journey with the Nepali Congress ended when he joined the Rastriya Swatantra Party in 2026.

== Electoral performance ==
Election	Year	Constituency	Contested for	Political party	Result	Votes	% of votes	Ref.
Nepal general election	2026	Bardiya 2	Pratinidhi Sabha member	Rastriya Swatantra Party	Won	29,678	33.67%	
