= Thakurbaba =

Thakurbaba Municipality ठाकुरबाबा
- Municipality
- Location within Lumbini Province Location within Nepal
- Coordinates: 28.45°N 81.31°E
- Country: Nepal
- Province: Lumbini Province
- District: Bardiya
- No. of wards: 9
- Established: 19 September 2015
- Incorporated (VDC): Neulapur, Baganaha, Sivapur and Thakurdwara
- Incorporated (date): 2017

Government
  - Type: Mayor–council
  - Body: Thakurbaba Municipality Municipality
  - Mayor: Tilak Ram Lamsal
  - Deputy Mayor: Bina Kumari Bhattarai

Area
  - Total: 104.57 km^{2} (40.37 sq mi)

Population (2011)
  - Total: 44,361
  - Density: 424.22/km^{2} (1,098.7/sq mi)
- Time zone: UTC+05:45 (NPT)
- Website: thakurbabamun.gov.np

Thakurbaba (Nepali: ठाकुरबाबा) (earlier:Babai municipality) is a municipality located in Bardiya District in the Lumbini Province of Nepal. It is one out of six municipalities of Bardiya District. The municipality is surrounded by Bardiya National Park from the east, west and north, and Madhuwan and Barbardiya from the south.

The total area of the municipality is 104.57 square kilometres (40.37 sq mi) and the total population according to the 2011 Nepal census is 44361 individuals. The municipality is divided into a total of 9 wards.

== Background ==
The municipality was established on 19 September 2015, when the government announced 26 more new municipalities. This new municipality was established merging the two then VDCs, e.g. Neulapur and Baganaha and this new municipality was named Babai, later on 10 March 2017 two more VDCs Sivapur and Thakurdwara Incorporated with this municipality and renamed it to Thakurbaba.

== Demographics ==
At the time of the 2011 Nepal census, Thakurbaba Municipality had a population of 45,173. Of these, 58.1% spoke Tharu, 39.2% Nepali, 0.8% Magar, 0.4% Urdu, 0.3% Assamese, 0.3% Yakkha, 0.2% Newar, 0.2% Hindi, 0.2% Acchami, 0.2% Newar, 0.1% Maithili and 0.1% other languages as their first language.

In terms of ethnicity/caste, 58.6% were Tharu, 13.7% Hill Brahmin, 13.3% Chhetri, 4.9% Kami, 2.5% Thakuri, 1.9% Magar, 1.6% Damai/Dholi, 1.1% Sanyasi/Dasnami, 0.6% Musalman, 0.4% Newar, 0.3% Yakkha, 0.2% Lohar, 0.1% Badi, 0.1% other Dalit, 0.1% Gurung, 0.1% Rai, 0.1% Sarki, 0.1% Tamang and 0.2% others.

In terms of religion, 96.1% were Hindu, 2.3% Christian, 0.9% Buddhist, 0.6% Muslim and 0.1% Kirati.

In terms of literacy, 68.0% could read and write, 1.6% could only read and 30.4% could neither read nor write.

== See also ==
- Bardiya District
- Lumbini Province
