= Barbardiya =

Barbardiya बारबर्दिया
- Municipality (नगरपालिका)
- Location within Lumbini Province Location within Nepal
- Coordinates: 28.316528°N 81.387199°E
- Country: Nepal
- Province: Lumbini
- District: Bardiya
- No. of wards: 11
- Established: 10 March 2017
- Incorporated (VDC): Baniyabhar, Padanaha, Magaragadi and Dhadhawar

Government
  - Type: Mayor–council
  - Body: Barbardiya Municipality Municipality
  - Mayor: Chhabilal Tharu
  - Deputy Mayor: Ratna Panday

Area
  - Total: 226.09 km^{2} (87.29 sq mi)

Population (2021)
  - Total: 72,533
  - Density: 320.81/km^{2} (830.91/sq mi)
- Time zone: UTC+05:45 (NPT)
- Website: barbardiyamun.gov.np

Barbardiya Municipality (Nepali: बारबर्दिया) is a municipality located in Bardiya District in Lumbini Province of Nepal.

On 10 March 2017 Government of Nepal announced 744 local level units as per the new constitution of Nepal 2015. On the same date this municipality also came into existence, merging the then VDCs of Baniyabhar, Padanaha, Magaragadi and Dhadhawar. The municipality is situated in the center of the district on the latitudes of 28 degree 26 minute to 28 degree 36 minute north and longitude 81 degree 30 minute to 81 degree 50 minute east. The municipality is surrounded by Bansgadhi municipality in the east, Madhuban municipality in the west, Thakurbaba municipality and Bardiya National Park in the north and Gulariya municipality in the south. Total population of the municipality is 68012 and the total area of the municipality is 226.09 square kilometres (87.29 sq mi) and the municipality is divided into total 11 wards.

== Demographics ==
At the time of the 2021 Nepal census, Barbadiya Municipality had a population of 72,533. Of these, 72.5% spoke Tharu, 24.3% Nepali, 1.8% Magar, 0.4% Raji, 0.2% Avadhi, 0.1% Achhami and 0.1% Hindi as their first language.

In terms of ethnicity/caste, 74.0% were Tharu, 9.7% Chhetri, 4.7% Hill Brahmin, 3.6% Bishwokarma, 2.8% Magar, 1.7% Damai/Dholi, 1.1% Sanyasi/Dasnami, 1.1% Thakuri, 0.8% Sarki, 0.4% Raji, 0.3% Badi, 0.3% Gurung, 0.2% Musalman, 0.1% other Dalit, 0.1% Kumal, 0.1% Lohar, 0.1% Newar, 0.1% Tamang, 0.1% other Terai and 0.1% others.

In terms of religion, 94.9% were Hindu, 4.0% Christian, 0.8% Buddhist and 0.3% Islam.

In terms of literacy, 79.1% could read and write, 1.9% could only read and 19.0% could neither read nor write.
