= Blackbuck Conservation Area =

Blackbuck (Krishnasar) Conservation Area
- Nepali: कृष्णसार संरक्षण क्षेत्र
- IUCN category VI (protected area with sustainable use of natural resources)
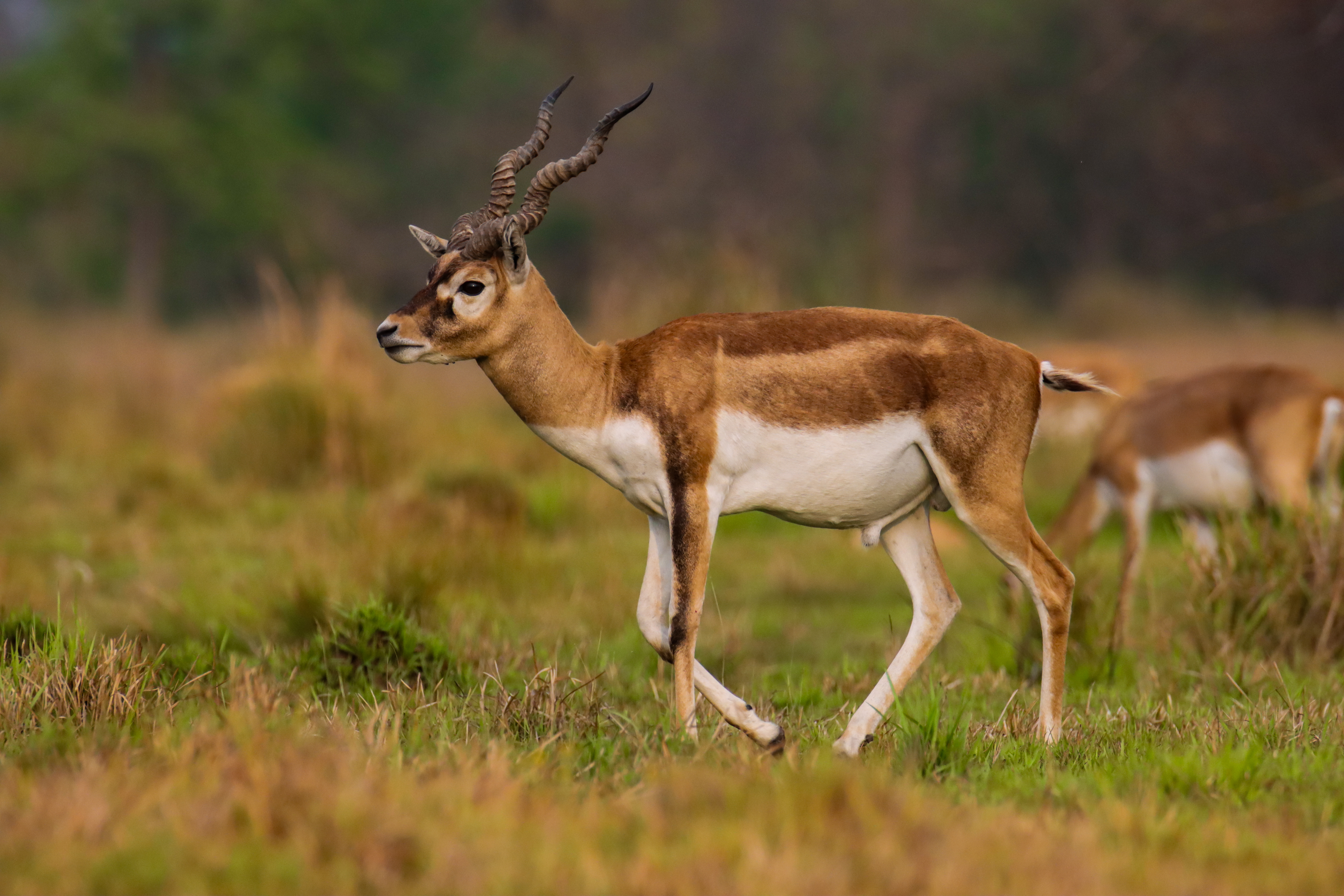
- Male blackbuck

- Location within Lumbini Province Location within Nepal Location within South Asia
- Location: Gulariya, Bardiya District, Lumbini Province, Nepal
- Coordinates: 28°15′N 81°20′E
- Area: 16.95 km^{2} (6.54 sq mi)
- Established: March 2009
- Governing body: Department of National Parks and Wildlife Conservation

The Blackbuck Conservation Area is located in Gulariya, Bardiya District, Nepal and was established in 2009 to conserve the endangered blackbuck. This protected area covers 16.95 km^{2} (6.54 sq mi).

== History ==
Attempts for the conservation of blackbuck in Nepal began in 1975 when a small herd was spotted in Khairapur ward no. 3, Gulariya Municipality of Bardiya District. Realizing their fragile existence, immediate efforts were made to protect the herd. The government deployed five staff members, providing four of them with arms. A guard post was also established in the same year. This particular herd is the northernmost surviving herd of blackbucks in the world. In 2009, the herd numbered 202 comprising 73 males, 111 females and 18 calves.

During 1995–1997, the Government of Nepal obtained private land for blackbuck conservation.
