= Manau =

Manau may refer to:

- Manau (group), a hip-hop band
- Manau, Nepal
- Rattan, a plant, from the Malay rotan manau
- Manau (dance), a Kachin dance
- Manau Gododdin or Manaw Gododdin, an area of what is now Scotland in the Early Middle Ages
- Mânău, a village in Ulmeni, Maramureș, Romania
