= Bam Dev Gautam =

Nepali politician

- बाम देव गौतम
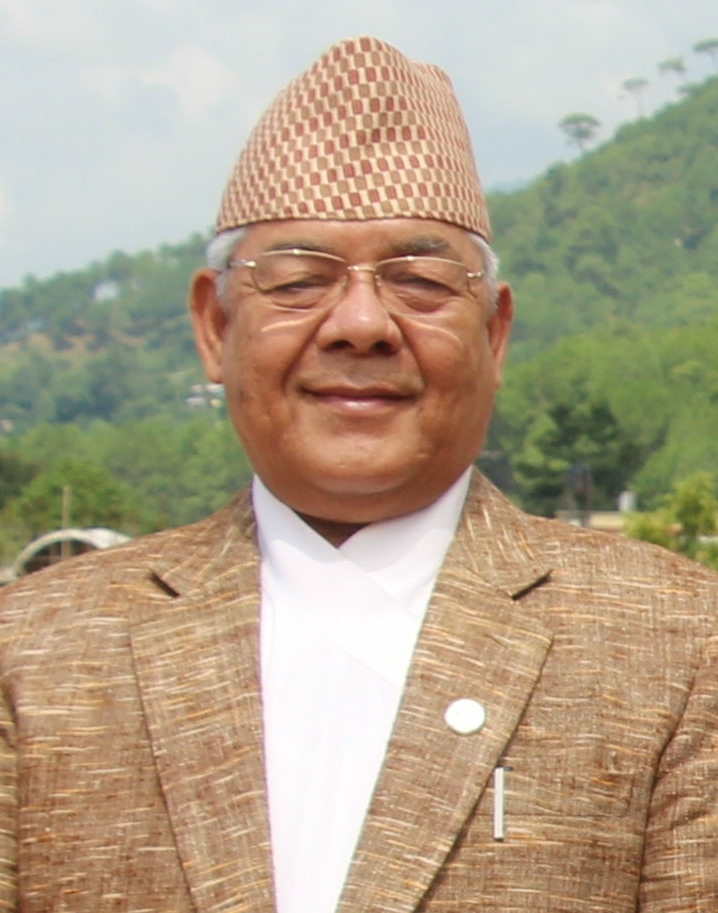
- Gautam in 2015

Leader of the Opposition
- In office 23 December 1998 – 31 May 1999
- Prime Minister: Girija Prasad Koirala
- Preceded by: Man Mohan Adhikari
- Succeeded by: Madhav Kumar Nepal

Deputy Prime Minister of Nepal
- In office 25 February 2014 – 12 October 2015
- President: Ram Baran Yadav
- Prime Minister: Sushil Koirala
- In office 18 August 2008 – 25 May 2009
- President: Ram Baran Yadav
- Prime Minister: Pushpa Kamal Dahal
- In office 12 March 1997 – 7 October 1997
- Monarch: Birendra
- Prime Minister: Lokendra Bahadur Chand

Minister of Home Affairs
- In office 25 February 2014 – 12 October 2015
- Prime Minister: Sushil Koirala
- Preceded by: Madhav Ghimire
- Succeeded by: Shakti Bahadur Basnet
- In office 18 August 2008 – 25 May 2009
- Prime Minister: Pushpa Kamal Dahal
- Preceded by: Krishna Prasad Sitaula
- Succeeded by: Bhim Bahadur Rawal
- In office 12 March 1997 – 7 October 1997
- Prime Minister: Lokendra Bahadur Chand
- Preceded by: Khum Bahadur Khadka
- Succeeded by: Budhhiman Tamang

Member of the National Assembly
- In office 17 September 2020 – 18 January 2026
- Preceded by: Yuba Raj Khatiwada
- Succeeded by: TBD
- Constituency: Nominated by President

Member of the Constituent Assembly
- In office 21 January 2014 – 14 October 2017
- Preceded by: Narayan Prasad Adhikari
- Succeeded by: Durga Paudel (as Member of Parliament)
- Constituency: Pyuthan 1

Member of the House of Representatives
- In office 20 June 1991 – 15 January 1999
- Preceded by: Constituency created
- Succeeded by: Kashi Paudel
- Constituency: Bardiya 1

Personal details
- Born: Pyuthan District
- Party: Nepali Communist Party
- Other political affiliations: CPN (ML) (1998-2002); CPN (UML) (until 1998, 2002-2018); Nepal Communist Party (2018-2021); CPN (Unified Socialist) (2024-2025)
- Spouse: Tulsi Thapa

Bam Dev Gautam (Nepali: बाम देव गौतम) is a Nepalese politician and the former Home Minister and Deputy Prime Minister of Nepal. Currently the senior leader of Nepali Communist Party, Gautam is a former Senior Vice Chairman of Communist Party of Nepal (Unified Marxist–Leninist). He also served as a member of the National Assembly nominated by the President from 2020 to 2026.

Gautam left Communist Party of Nepal (Unified Marxist–Leninist) on 4 September 2021 and has not joined any party yet. It was reported that he may join CPN (Unified Socialist) or float a new party of his own soon. Later Gautam wrote an election song for CPN (Unified Socialist) after which he was thought to have joined that party. Gautam announced his own party on 28 June 2022, named the Communist Party of Nepal (Unity National Campaign).

== Personal life ==
After completing his SLC, Gautam started teaching as a profession. He is married to Tulsi Thapa who is also a Member of House of Representatives.

== Political life ==
=== Early political career ===
Bam dev Gautam joined the Communist party of Nepal in 1964 and participated in full-time party activities from Rupandehi District in 1969. He became District Secretary of CPN Rupandehi in 1972. He played a major role in establishing Mukti Morcha with Madan Bhandari and Jeev Raj Ashrit. He later became Central member of Communist Party of Nepal(Marxist–Leninist) in 1980. After the merger, he was made a Politburo member of CPN(UML) and also attained the position of Deputy General Secretary of the party.

He was elected MP from Bardiya Constituency No. 1 in first General Election 1991 and Mid Term Election 1994. Later he became the Deputy Prime Minister and Home Minister in February 1997.

=== Split of CPN (UML) and formation of CPN (ML) ===
Bam Dev Gautam played a major role in splitting the CPN(UML) over the issue of Mahakali treaty with India and later formed CPN(ML) on 5 March 1998. He was elected General Secretary of the party in March of that year.

=== Merger to CPN (UML) ===
The party failed to get a single seat in House in next election. Later, Bam Dev Gautam again joined the CPN (UML). On 31 August 2008, Bam Dev Gautam was appointed as the Deputy Prime Minister and Home Minister in the Maoist-led coalition government.

=== In federal democratic republican Nepal ===
In February 2009, Bam Dev Gautam was elected one of the vice-chairman of CPN(UML) in Butwal General Convention. On 2 May 2010 during Maoist protests, Bam Dev Gautam called for the Prime Minister to resign to end the current political stalemate. He was a member of the 2nd Nepalese Constituent Assembly. He won bot the seats he contested Bardia 1 and Pyuthan 1 in CA assembly, 2013 from the CPN (UML).

=== 2017-present ===
In 2022 he was defeated by Sanjay Gautam of Nepali Congress in spite of left alliance forged between CPN (UML) and CPN (Maoist Centre). Presently, Gautam serves as member of National Assembly nominated by President on recommendation of council of ministers.

== Electoral history ==
=== 2017 legislative elections ===
Bardiya 1
| Party | Candidate | Votes |
|---|---|---|
| Nepali Congress | Sanjay Kumar Gautam | 44,829 |
| CPN (Unified Marxist–Leninist) | Bam Dev Gautam | 44,076 |
| CPN (Marxist–Leninist) | Nar Bahadur Bohora | 2,372 |
| Others | | 2,228 |
| Invalid votes | | 5,948 |
| Result | Congress gain | |
Source: Election Commission

=== 2013 Constituent Assembly election ===
Bardiya 1
| Party | Candidate | Votes |
|---|---|---|
| CPN (Unified Marxist–Leninist) | Bam Dev Gautam | 18,347 |
| UCPN (Maoist) | Bhuwan Kumar Tharu | 11,628 |
| Nepali Congress | Bhuwaneshwar Chaudhary | 8,598 |
| Madhesi Janaadhikar Forum, Nepal (Democratic) | Thakur Singh Tharu | 1,174 |
| Others | | 3,595 |
| Result | CPN (UML) gain | |
Source: NepalNews

Pyuthan 1
| Party | Candidate | Votes |
|---|---|---|
| CPN (Unified Marxist–Leninist) | Bam Dev Gautam | 13,962 |
| Rastriya Janamorcha | Kishna Bahadur Khadka | 8,724 |
| UCPN (Maoist) | Navaraj Subedi | 7,054 |
| Nepali Congress | Hukum Bahadur Bista | 5,215 |
| CPN (Marxist–Leninist) | Yam Bahadur Gurung | 1,017 |
| Others | | 626 |
| Result | CPN (UML) gain | |
Source: NepalNews

=== 2008 Constituent Assembly election ===
Bardiya 1
| Party | Candidate | Votes |
|---|---|---|
| CPN (Maoist) | Sarala Regmi | 17,955 |
| CPN (Unified Marxist–Leninist) | Bam Dev Gautam | 13,773 |
| Nepali Congress | Malati Sodari | 6,831 |
| Rastriya Prajatantra Party | Govinda Prasad Tharu | 2,324 |
| CPN (Marxist–Leninist) | Nar Bahadur Bohora | 1,815 |
| Madhesi Janaadhikar Forum, Nepal | Thakur Singh Tharu | 1,340 |
| Others | | 1,154 |
| Invalid votes | | 1,163 |
| Result | Maoist gain | |
Source: Election Commission

==== 1999 legislative elections ====
Bardiya 1
| Party | Candidate | Votes |
|---|---|---|
| Nepali Congress | Kashi Paudel | 17,219 |
| CPN (Marxist–Leninist) | Bam Dev Gautam | 13,247 |
| CPN (Unified Marxist–Leninist) | Gobinda Prasad Koirala | 10,885 |
| Rastriya Prajatantra Party (Chand) | Gaurav Chand | 1,646 |
| Others | | 2,774 |
| Invalid votes | | 1,490 |
| Result | Congress gain | |
Source: Election Commission

=== 1994 legislative elections ===
Bardiya 1
| Party | Candidate | Votes |
|---|---|---|
| CPN (Unified Marxist–Leninist) | Bam Dev Gautam | 16,933 |
| Nepali Congress | Phul Ram Tharu | 10,949 |
| Rastriya Prajatantra Party | Thakur Singh Tharu | 5,757 |
| Result | CPN (UML) hold | |
Source: Election Commission

=== 1991 legislative elections ===
Bardiya 1
| Party | Candidate | Votes |
|---|---|---|
| CPN (Unified Marxist–Leninist) | Bam Dev Gautam | 16,486 |
| Nepali Congress | | 11,712 |
| Result | CPN (UML) gain | |

== See also ==
- 2021 split in Nepal Communist Party
- 2021 split in Communist Party of Nepal (Unified Marxist-Leninist)
- CPN (Unity National Campaign)
