= Mahamadpur =

Mahamadpur may refer to:

- Mahamadpur, Bheri, Nepal
- Mahamadpur, Narayani, Nepal
