= Surya Bahadur Thapa Chhetri =

Nepali politician

- सूर्य बहादुर थापा क्षेत्री

Member of the House of Representatives
- In office 26 December 2022 – 12 September 2025
- Preceded by: Durga Paudel
- Succeeded by: Sushant Vaidik
- Constituency: Pyuthan 1

Personal details
- Born: 23 July 1974 (age 51) Pyuthan District
- Party: CPN (UML)

Surya Bahadur Thapa Chhetri is a Nepalese politician, belonging to the CPN (UML) who served as a member of the 2nd Federal Parliament of Nepal after being elected in the 2022 Nepalese general election from Pyuthan 1 (constituency). He was defeated in the 2026 general election.
