= Bansgadhi =

Bansgadhi बाँसगढी
- Municipality
- Location in Lumbini Province Bansgadhi (Nepal)
- Coordinates: 28.242954°N 81.518438°E
- Country: Nepal
- Province: Lumbini
- District: Bardiya

Government
  - Mayor: Khadka Bahadur Khadka (NCP)
  - Deputy Mayor: Sushma Chaudhary (NCP)

Area
  - Total: 206 km^{2} (80 sq mi)
- Website: bansgadhimun.gov.np

Bansgadhi (Nepali: बाँसगढी) is a municipality in the Bardiya District in southwestern Nepal.

Bansgadhi was established on 2 December 2014. The city covers 206 square kilometers and is located in Terai, 20 kilometers north of Nepalganj. The highway Mahendra Rajmarg runs through Bansgadhi.

== Demographics ==
At the time of the 2011 Nepal census, Bansgadhi Municipality had a population of 55,875. Of these, 50.0% spoke Nepali, 46.1% Tharu, 1.5% Awadhi, 0.7% Urdu, 0.5% Hindi, 0.3% Magar, 0.2% Maithili, 0.2% Raji, 0.2% Newar, 0.1% Gurung, 0.1% Tamang and 0.1% other languages as their first language.

In terms of ethnicity/caste, 46.6% were Tharu, 18.1% Chhetri, 10.4% Hill Brahmin, 8.0% Kami, 4.8% Thakuri, 3.5% Magar, 2.3% Damai/Dholi, 1.3% Yadav, 1.2% Musalman, 0.9% Sanyasi/Dasnami, 0.5% Gurung, 0.4% Sarki, 0.3% Newar, 0.3% Rajbanshi, 0.2% Badi, 0.2% Raji, 0.2% Tamang, 0.1% Chepang/Praja, 0.1% other Dalit, 0.1% Darai, 0.1% Gharti/Bhujel, 0.1% Kumal, 0.1% other Terai and 0.1% others.

In terms of religion, 96.5% were Hindu, 1.6% Christian, 1.2% Muslim and 0.6% Buddhist.

In terms of literacy, 66.4% could read and write, 2.4% could only read and 31.2% could neither read nor write.
