= Pyuthan 1 =

Parliamentary constituency in Nepal

- Parliamentary constituency
- Pyuthan 1 in Lumbini Province
- Province: Lumbini Province
- District: Pyuthan District
- Electorate: 165,406

Current constituency
- Created: 1991
- Party: Rastriya Swatantra Party
- Member of Parliament: Sushant Vaidik

Pyuthan 1 is the parliamentary constituency of Pyuthan District in Nepal. This constituency came into existence on the Constituency Delimitation Commission (CDC) report submitted on 31 August 2017.

== Incorporated areas ==
Pyuthan 1 incorporates the entirety of Pyuthan District.

== Assembly segments ==
It encompasses the following Lumbini Provincial Assembly segment

- Pyuthan 1(A)
- Pyuthan 1(B)

== Members of Parliament ==
=== Parliament/Constituent Assembly ===
Election	Member	Party
1991	Shiva Raj Subedi	Nepali Congress
1994	Shiva Raj Subedi	Nepali Congress
1999	Hari Acharya	Rastriya Janamorcha
2008	Narayan Prasad Adhikari	CPN (Maoist)
January 2009	Narayan Prasad Adhikari	UCPN (Maoist)
2013	Bam Dev Gautam	CPN (Unified Marxist–Leninist)
2017	Durga Paudel	Rastriya Janamorcha
2022	Surya Bahadur Thapa Chhetri	CPN (Unified Marxist–Leninist)
2026	Sushant Vaidik	Rastriya Swatantra Party

=== Provincial Assembly ===
==== 1(A) ====
Election	Member	Party
2017	Hari Prasad Rijal	CPN (Unified Marxist-Leninist)
May 2018	Hari Prasad Rijal	Nepal Communist Party

==== 1(B) ====
Election	Member	Party
2017	Krishna Dhoj Khadka	CPN (Maoist Centre)
May 2018	Krishna Dhoj Khadka	Nepal Communist Party

== Election results ==
=== Election in the 2020s ===
==== 2026 general election ====
Candidate	Party	Votes	%
Sushant Vaidik	Rastriya Swatantra Party	27,469	33.85
Dr. Govind Raj Pokharel	Nepali Congress	18,338	22.60
Surya Bahadur Thapa Chhetri	CPN (UML)	16,710	20.59
Krishna Dhwoj Khadka	Nepali Communist Party	9,074	11.18
Tilak Bahadur G.C.	Rastriya Janamorcha	7,654	9.43
Govind Giri	Shram Sanskriti Party	594	0.73
Sita B.K.	Nepal Communist Party (Maoist)	501	0.62
Daneshwar Pandit	Rastriya Prajatantra Party	415	0.51
Others		391	0.48
Total		81,146	100.00
Valid votes		81,146	95.76
Invalid/blank votes		3,591	4.24
Total votes		84,737	100.00
Registered voters/turnout		165,406	51.23
Majority		9,131	
Rastriya Swatantra Party gain			

==== 2022 general election ====
Candidate	Party	Votes	%
Surya Bahadur Thapa Chhetri	CPN (UML)	41,118	49.37
Durga Paudel	Rastriya Janamorcha	35,814	43.00
Krishna Prasad Pokharel	Rastriya Swatantra Party	3,318	3.98
Hom Bahadur Budhathoki Magar	Rastriya Prajatantra Party	1,472	1.77
Madhav Singh K.C.	CPN (Marxist–Leninist)	1,121	1.35
Others		440	0.53
Total		83,283	100.00
Majority		5,304	
CPN (UML) gain			

=== Election in the 2010s ===
==== 2017 legislative elections ====
Party	Candidate	Votes
Rastriya Janamorcha	Durga Paudel	47,514
Nepali Congress	Dr. Govinda Raj Pokharel	31,286
CPN (Marxist–Leninist)	Madhav Singh K.C.	2,565
Others		1,281
Result	Janamorcha gain	
Source: Election Commission

==== 2017 Nepalese provincial elections ====
===== 1(A) =====
Party	Candidate	Votes
CPN (Unified Marxist–Leninist)	Hari Prasad Rijal	24,734
Nepali Congress	Tek Prasad Bhandari	12,639
CPN (Marxist–Leninist)	Tek Prasad Bhandari	1,064
Patriotic People's Democratic Front Nepal	Dhaneshwar Pokharel	307
Result	CPN (UML) gain	
Source: Election Commission

===== 1(B) =====
Party	Candidate	Votes
CPN (Maoist Centre)	Krishna Dhoj Khadka	27,910
Nepali Congress	Amar Prasad Bhandari	14,138
CPN (Marxist–Leninist)	Hari Singh Budhathoki Magar	1,971
Others		745
Result	Maoist Centre gain	
Source: Election Commission

==== 2013 Constituent Assembly election ====
Party	Candidate	Votes
CPN (Unified Marxist–Leninist)	Bam Dev Gautam	13,962
Rastriya Janamorcha	Kishna Bahadur Khadka	8,724
UCPN (Maoist)	Navaraj Subedi	7,054
Nepali Congress	Hukum Bahadur Bista	5,215
CPN (Marxist–Leninist)	Yam Bahadur Gurung	1,017
Others		626
Result	CPN (UML) gain	
Source: NepalNews

=== Election in the 2000s ===
==== 2008 Constituent Assembly election ====
Party	Candidate	Votes
CPN (Maoist)	Narayan Prasad Adhikari	13,096
Rastriya Janamorcha	Hari Acharya	11,345
CPN (Unified Marxist–Leninist)	Dhan Bahadur Rayamajhi	9,349
Nepali Congress	Diwakar Gautam	4,925
CPN (Marxist–Leninist)	Ravi Lal Roka Magar	1,869
Others		2,567
Invalid votes		1,665
Result	Maoist gain	
Source: Election Commission

=== Election in the 1990s ===
==== 1999 legislative elections ====
Party	Candidate	Votes
Rastriya Janamorcha	Hari Acharya	14,890
CPN (Marxist–Leninist)	Chakra Bahadur Roka Magar	6,194
Nepali Congress	Diwakar Gautam	5,806
Rastriya Prajatantra Party	Netra Bahadur Rokaya	4,944
Others		695
Invalid votes		770
Result	Janamorcha gain	
Source: Election Commission

==== 1994 legislative elections ====
Party	Candidate	Votes
Nepali Congress	Shiva Raj Subedi	9,403
Independent	Keshar Bahadur Gurung	9,143
Rastriya Prajatantra Party	Tanka Bahadur Bista	7,855
Others		1,137
Result	Congress hold	
Source: Election Commission

==== 1991 legislative elections ====
Party	Candidate	Votes
Nepali Congress	Shiva Raj Subedi	6,536
Samyukta Janamorcha Nepal		4,628
Result	Congress gain	

== See also ==
- List of parliamentary constituencies of Nepal
