= Belawa =

Coordinates: 28°15′N 81°35′E

Belawa बेलवा
- Village in Bansgadhi Municipality
- Location in Lumbini Province Belawa (Nepal)
- Country: Nepal
- Province: Lumbini Province
- District: Bardiya District

Population (2011)
  - Total: 15,568
- Time zone: UTC+5:45 (Nepal Time)

Belawa is a village in Bansgadhi Municipality, Bardiya District in Lumbini Province of south-western Nepal. At the time of the 2011 Nepal census it had a population of 15,568 people living in 3,235 individual households. There were 7,447 males and 8,121 females at the time of census.
