= Sant Kumar Tharu =

Nepali politician

- सन्त कुमार थारु

Member of Parliament, Pratinidhi Sabha
- Incumbent
- Assumed office 4 March 2018
- Preceded by: Sanjay Kumar Gautam
- Constituency: Bardiya 2

Member of 1st and 2nd Constituent Assembly
- In office 28 May 2008 – 14 October 2017
- Preceded by: Khemraj Bhatta 'Mayalu'
- Succeeded by: Constituency abolished
- Constituency: Bardiya 3

Personal details
- Born: August 31, 1969 (age 56)
- Party: CPN (Maoist Centre)

Sant Kumar Tharu (Nepali: सन्त कुमार थारु) is a Nepalese politician, belonging to the Communist Party of Nepal.

== History ==
In the 2008 Constituent Assembly election he was elected from the Bardiya-3 constituency, winning 23663 votes. He won the Bardiya–3 seat in 2013 Nepalese Constituent Assembly election from the Unified Communist Party of Nepal (Maoist).
