= Mathurahardwar =

Mathurahardwar मथुराहरद्वार
- Village development committee
- Country: Nepal
- Province: Lumbini Province
- District: Bardiya District

Population (1991)
  - Total: 9,064
- Time zone: UTC+5:45 (Nepal Time)

Mathurahardwar is a village development committee in Bardiya District in Lumbini Province of south-western Nepal. At the time of the 1991 Nepal census it had a population of 9,064 and had 1405 houses in the town.
