= List of mosques in Nepal =

This is a list of mosques in Nepal.

Name	Images	Location	Year/century	Remarks	References
Jama Masjid Rahmaniya		Bhairahawa	1950	One of the oldest mosques in Nepal	
Pancha Kashmiri Takiya Masjid		Kathmandu	15th century		
Barkati Jame Masjid	Mosque in Nepal	Bharatpur, Chitwan	1959 A.D.	Oldest mosque in Bharatpur, Chitwan and also one of the largest in Nepal.	
Jama Mosque		Nepalgunj			
Shahbaba Mosque		Nepalgunj			
Namaj Mosque		Nepalgunj			
Gausiya Jyaul Mosque		Nepalgunj			
Ekminari Mosque		Nepalgunj			
Fulbari Mosque		Nepalgunj			
Shreepur Mosque Madrasa barkatul uloom Birgunj 3		Birgunj			
Al jamiyatul Gossia Jame Masjid		Biratnagar			
Sarouchiya Masjid		Biratnagar			
Parsa Jamah Masjid		Parsa bazar Ward no. 1			

== See also ==
- Islam in Nepal
- Lists of mosques
- Nepalese Muslims
