= Sanesri =

Coordinates: 28°18′N 81°14′E

Sanoshree सानेश्री
- Village development committee
- Interactive map of Sanoshree
- Country: Nepal
- Province: Lumbini Province
- District: Bardiya District

Population (1991)
  - Total: 12,542
- Time zone: UTC+5:45 (Nepal Time)
- Postcode: 21814

Sanoshree, Taratal, Dhodhari and Suryapatuwa is a Village development committee Before federalism in Nepal (20 september 2015) Now all village development committees have formed a municipality named Madhuvan. development committee in Bardiya District in Lumbini Province of south-western Nepal. At the time of the 1991 Nepal census it had a population of 12,542 and had 2266 houses in the town.
