= Motipur, Bardiya =

Motipur, Nepal मोतिपुर
- Village development committee
- Location in Lumbini Province Motipur, Nepal (Nepal)
- Coordinates: 27°42′N 83°08′E
- Country: Nepal
- Province: Lumbini Province

Population (1991)
  - Total: 14,760
- Time zone: UTC+5:45 (Nepal Time)

Motipur is a village development committee in Bardiya District in Lumbini Province of south-western Nepal. At the time of the 1991 Nepal census it had a population of 14,760 and had 2151 houses in the town.
