= Sushant Vaidik =

Nepalese politician and economist

The Honourable Sushant Vaidik
- सुशान्त वैदिक

Member of Parliament, Pratinidhi Sabha
- Incumbent
- Assumed office 26 March 2026
- Preceded by: Surya Bahadur Thapa Chhetri
- Constituency: Pyuthan 1

Personal details
- Citizenship: Nepalese
- Party: Rastriya Swatantra Party
- Education: Master of Economics (MA); Political Science (MSc)
- Alma mater: London School of Economics (Msc); Norwegian School of Economics (MA)
- Profession: Politician; Economist

Sushant Vaidik (Note: Nepali: सुशान्त वैदिक) is a Nepalese politician and economist serving as a member of parliament from the Rastriya Swatantra Party. He is the member of the 7th Pratinidhi Sabha elected from Pyuthan 1 constituency in 2026 Nepalese General Election securing 27,469 votes and defeating his closest contender Govind Raj Pokharel of the Nepali Congress.

He previously worked as an economic and policy making advisor for provincial government of Lumbini province under the chief ministers like Dilli Bahadur Chaudhary of Nepali Congress and Jokh Bahadur Mahara of Maoist Centre. He holds Msc in Political Science from London School of Economics and Master of Economics from Norwegian School of Economics. Presently Vaidik is overseeing day-to-day operations of the Ministry of Industry, Commerce, and Supplies under Balen Shah Government.
