= Khairi Chandanpur =

Khairi Chandanpur खैरी चन्दनपुर
- Village development committee
- Location in Lumbini Province Khairi Chandanpur (Nepal)
- Coordinates: 28.39°N 81.19°E
- Country: Nepal
- Province: Lumbini Province
- District: Bardiya District

Population (1991)
  - Total: 5,303
- Time zone: UTC+5:45 (Nepal Time)

Khairi Chandanpur is a village development committee in Bardiya District in the Lumbini Province of south-western Nepal. At the time of the 1991 Nepal census it had a population of 5,303 and had 656 houses in the town.
