= Thakur Singh Tharu =

Nepalese politician

The Honourable Thakur Singh Tharu
- ठाकुरसिंह थारु

Member of Parliament, Pratinidhi Sabha
- Incumbent
- Assumed office 26 March 2026
- Preceded by: Sanjay Kumar Gautam
- Constituency: Bardiya 1

Personal details
- Citizenship: Nepalese
- Party: Rastriya Swatantra Party
- Profession: Politician

Thakur Singh Tharu (Nepali: ठाकुरसिंह थारु) is a Nepalese politician serving as a member of parliament from the Rastriya Swatantra Party. He is the member of the 7th Pratinidhi Sabha elected from Bardiya 1 constituency in 2026 Nepalese General Election securing 49,631 votes and defeating his closest contender Salik Ram Adhikari of the CPN UML.

== Electoral performance ==
| Election | Year | Constituency | Contested for | Political party | Result | Votes | % of votes | Ref. |
|---|---|---|---|---|---|---|---|---|
| Nepal general election | 2026 | Bardiya 1 | Pratinidhi Sabha member | Rastriya Swatantra Party | Won | 49,631 | 51.37% | |
