= Jama Masjid Rahmaniya, Bhairahawa =

Mosque in Rupandehi, Siddharthanagar, Nepal

Jama Masjid Rahmaniya
- Masjid Rahmaniya Bhairahawa (مسجد رحمانیہ)
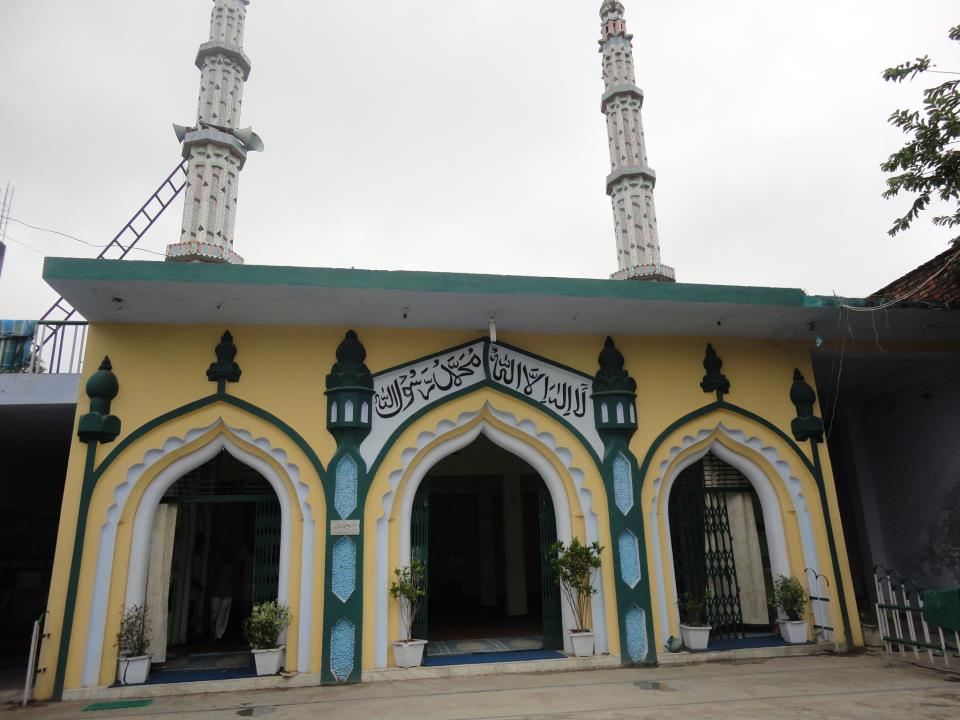
- A front view of Masjid Rahmaniya in 2013 AD

- Location within Nepal

Religion
- Affiliation: Islam
- Rite: Sunni Islam

Location
- Location: Bhairahawa, Rupandehi District, Lumbini Province
- Country: Nepal
- Administration: Ahle Sunnat Wa Jamat Anjuman Islamiya Committee
- Coordinates: 27.5000°N 83.4500°E

Architecture
- Type: Religious architecture
- Style: Islamic architecture
- Established: 1950 AD (विक्रम संवत् २०२०)

Specifications
- Capacity: 1500 People
- Dome: 1
- Minaret: 2
- Minaret height: 22m

The Jama Masjid Rahmaniya is the oldest mosque in Rupandehi, Bhairahawa, Nepal. Completed in 1950 AD (2007 BS). It is built in a traditional Islamic style, with a large central dome and four minarets, and is adorned with intricate designs and calligraphy on the interior. As the largest mosque in Rupandehi District, the Jama Masjid Rahmaniya serves as a place of worship and community gathering for the local Muslim community.

== See also ==
- List of mosques in Nepal
