= Lalbir Chaudhary =

Nepalese politician

Honourable Lalbir Chaudhary
- लालबीर चौधरी

Member-elect of the Parliament, Pratinidhi Sabha
- Incumbent
- Assumed office TBA
- Preceded by: Sant Kumar Tharu
- Constituency: Bardiya 2

Personal details
- Born: 4 February 1955 (age 71) Kailali District, Nepal
- Party: Nagrik Unmukti Party, Nepal
- Children: Resham Lal Chaudhary

Lalbir Chaudhary (Nepali: लालबिर चौधरी) is a Nepalese politician and father of Resham Lal Chaudhary, the founder of Nagrik Unmukti Party, Nepal. He was elected in 2022 from Bardiya 2 to the House of Representatives.

Though being a member of Nagrik Unmukti Party, Chaudhary had to contest election as independent after his son's candidacy was denied.

== See also ==
- Nagrik Unmukti Party, Nepal
