= Sivapur =

Thakurbaba Municipality ठाकुरबाबा नगरपालिका
- Municipality
- Location in Nepal
- Coordinates: 28.49°N 81.30°E
- Country: Nepal
- Province: Lumbini Province
- District: Bardiya District

Population (2011)
  - Total: 45,173
- Time zone: UTC+5:45 (Nepal Time)

Thakurbaba Municipality is a municipality in Bardiya District in Lumbini Province of south-western Nepal. At the time of the 2011 Nepal census it had a population of 38,501 and had 8000 houses in the town.
