= Deudakala =

Village development committee in Lumbini Province, Nepal

Deudhakala देउढाकाला
- Village development committee
- Location in Lumbini Province Deudhakala (Nepal)
- Coordinates: 28.27°N 81.47°E
- Country: Nepal
- Province: Lumbini Province
- District: Bardiya District

Population (1991)
  - Total: 11,625
- Time zone: UTC+5:45 (Nepal Time)

Deudhakala is a village development committee in Bardiya District in Lumbini Province of south-western Nepal. At the time of the 1991 Nepal census it had a population of 11,625 and had 1740 houses in the town. The village is home to the Tharu people.
