= Jamuni =

Village development committee in Lumbini Province, Nepal

Jamuni जमुनी
- Village development committee
- Location in Lumbini Province Jamuni (Nepal)
- Coordinates: 28.09°N 81.50°E
- Country: Nepal
- Province: Lumbini Province
- District: Bardiya District

Population (1991)
  - Total: 9,584
- Time zone: UTC+5:45 (Nepal Time)

Jamuni is a village development committee in Bardiya District in the Lumbini Province of south-western Nepal on the border with India. At the time of the 1991 Nepal census it had a population of 9,584 and had 1648 houses in the town.

Jamuni might also refer to the color purple in Hindi.

== Villages in Jamuni ==
- Sitapur
- Shantipur
- Thulo Danphe
- Sano Danphe
- Phutaha
- Jamuni
