= Patabhar =

Patabhar पटाभर
- Village development committee
- Location in Nepal
- Coordinates: 28.54°N 81.21°E
- Country: Nepal
- Province: Lumbini Province
- District: Bardiya District

Population (1991)
  - Total: 10,488
- Time zone: UTC+5:45 (Nepal Time)

Patabhar is a village development committee in Bardiya District in Lumbini Province of south-western Nepal. At the time of the 1991 Nepal census it had a population of 10,488 and had 1241 houses in the town.
