= Pashupatinagar, Bardiya =

Coordinates: 26°56′N 88°8′E

Pashupatinagar पशुपतिनगर
- Village development committee
- Location in Lumbini Province Pashupatinagar (Nepal)
- Country: Nepal
- Province: Lumbini Province
- District: Bardiya District

Population (1991)
  - Total: 4,766
- Time zone: UTC+5:45 (Nepal Time)

Pashupatinagar is a village development committee in Bardiya District in Lumbini Province of south-western Nepal. At the time of the 1991 Nepal census it had a population of 4,766 and had 613 houses in the town.
