= Suryapatawa =

Suryapatawa सूर्यपटवा
- Village development committee
- Location in Nepal
- Coordinates: 28.40°N 81.24°E
- Country: Nepal
- Province: Lumbini Province
- District: Bardiya District

Population (1991)
  - Total: 6,709
- Time zone: UTC+5:45 (Nepal Time)

Suryapatawa is a village development committee in Bardiya District in Lumbini Province of south-western Nepal. At the time of the 1991 Nepal census it had a population of 6,709 and had 826 houses in the town.
