= Manau (dance) =

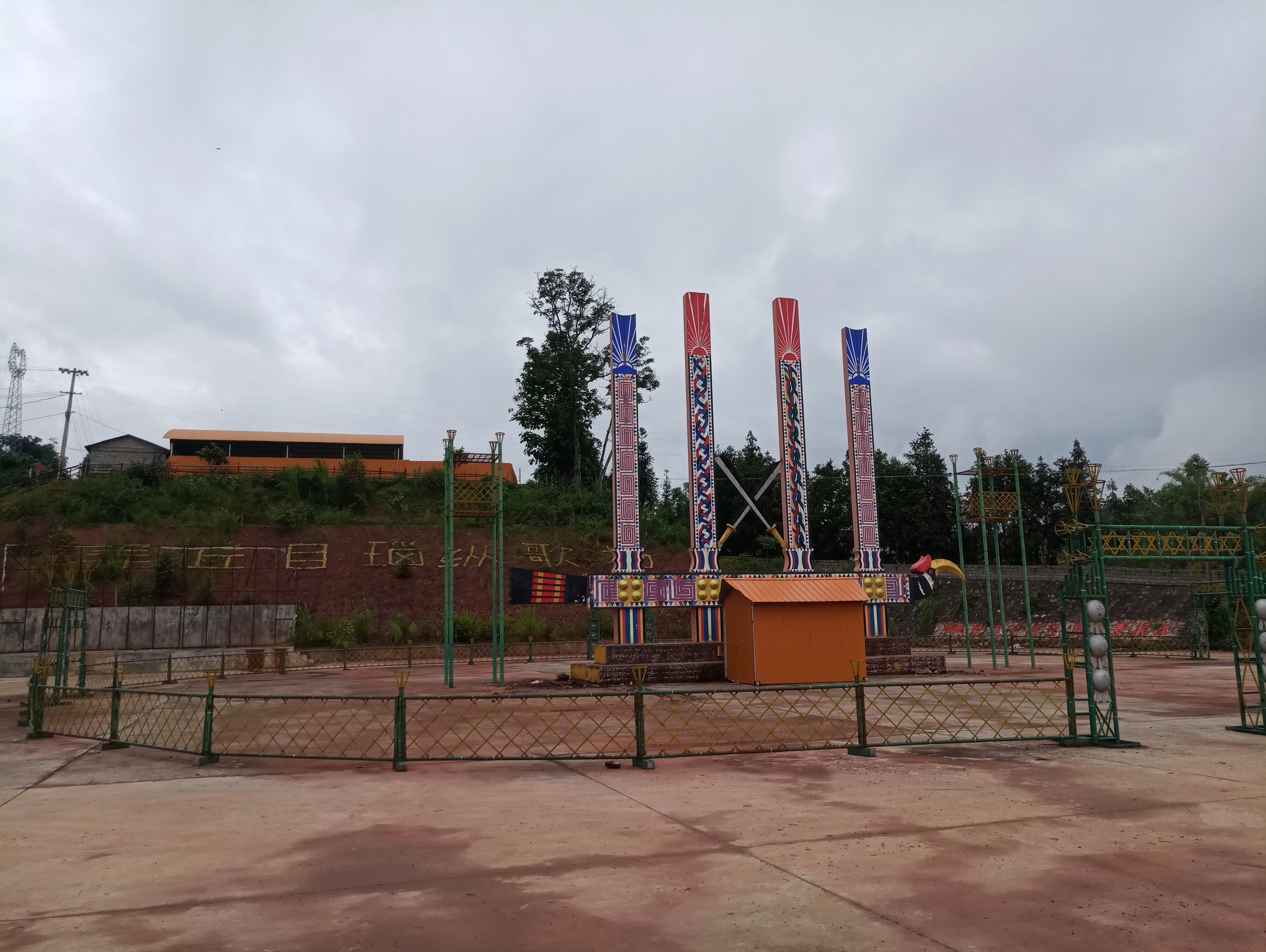
A manau ground in Mangshi, China

The manau (Burmese: မနော; Chinese: 目瑙纵歌; pinyin: Mùnǎo zònggē) dance is a traditional ceremony common to the Kachin (or Jinghpaw) people of northern Myanmar (Burma), Yunnan, China and Arunachal Pradesh, India.

Although the majority of Kachin people are Christian, the manau has its roots in animistic religion. The manau ground where the ceremony takes place is the cultural center of Kachin communities.

Manaus can be held throughout the year, but the biggest manau dance, the sut manau, is held in January. Many Kachin towns hold manau dances, with the largest celebrations taking place in Myitkyina, the capital of Kachin State in Myanmar, in Laiza, the capital of the Kachin Independence Organization (KIO), and in Ruili, a center of Kachin culture in Yunnan, China. There is also a manau in Arunachal Pradesh, India. A Manau is also held in Banmai Samakki, Thailand.

During the manau, a senior official leads a procession of dancers in circles around the sacred manau poles (Chinese: 示栋), which are decorated with diamond symbols and curved lines. Loud drums provide a beat for the dancers to follow. The manau leader (Kachin: naushawng; Chinese: 瑙双) wears a traditional headdress decorated with hornbill feathers.

Male dancers hold a traditional Kachin sword called a n'htu during the dance.

== History ==
According to legend, Jingpo people came down from the mountain, Majoi Shingra, to Hkranghku Majoi. Before then, they didn't celebrate Manaus. Between AD. 300 and 400, Jawa Rumja (Tingli yaw), the son of Pawng Yawng, married a Lamu madai girl. After that, Lamu madai led the first Manau.

== Myitkyina Manau ==
One of the largest Manau dances is held in Myitkyina. Traditionally it is held in January, each year, but conflict in the region has meant that the manau is only held occasionally. The Myitkyina Manau is currently managed by the Burmese government, a situation that has led to boycotts of the event by many Kachins.
