= Kalika, Bardiya =

Kalika, Bardiya कालिका
- Village development committee
- Location in Lumbini Province Kalika, Bardiya (Nepal)
- Coordinates: 28.20°N 81.44°E
- Country: Nepal
- Province: Lumbini Province
- District: Bardiya District

Population (1991)
  - Total: 7,547
- Time zone: UTC+5:45 (Nepal Time)

Kalika is a village development committee in Bardiya District in Lumbini Province of south-western Nepal. At the time of the 1991 Nepal census, it had a population of 7,547 and had 1,305 houses in the town.
