= Pancha Kashmiri Takiya Masjid =

Mosque in Kathmandu, Bagmati, Nepal

Pancha Kashmiri Takiya Mosque
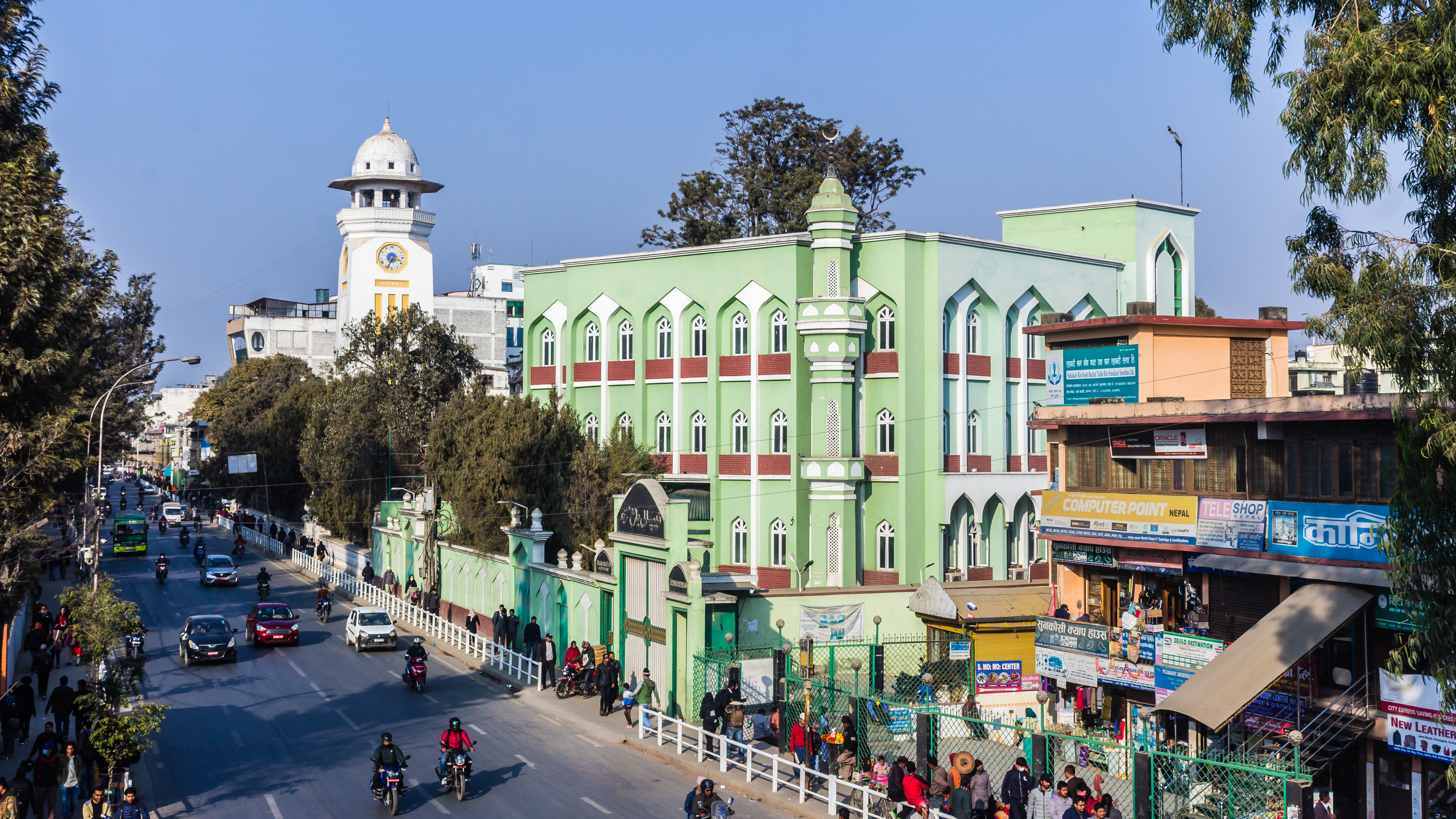

- Location within Kathmandu

Religion
- Affiliation: Islam
- Province: Bagmati

Location
- Location: Kathmandu, Bagmati, Nepal
- Country: Nepal
- Interactive map of Pancha Kashmiri Takiya Mosque
- Coordinates: 27.7087°N 85.315°E

Architecture
- Type: mosque

The Pancha Kashmiri Takiya Masjid commonly known as the Kashmiri Masjid, build in 15th century AD, is one of the oldest mosques of Nepal.

Muslims from Kashmir entered Nepal for trade during the time of king Ratna Malla and the mosque was built in the time of king Pratap Malla. The mosque has undergone multiple renovations. More Kashmiri people came to Kathmandu due to violence in Kashmir. The current mosque was built in the times of king Prithvi Narayan Shah after the Muslims helped him to spy on Malla rulers.

The mosque has three complexes viz. a prayer hall, an annexe and a madrasah. The tombs of Haji Mishkin Shah and Khwaja Gyasuddin Shah are inside the premises.

== See also ==
- List of mosques in Nepal
