= Mahamadpur, Bardiya =

Coordinates: 28°13′N 81°24′E

Mahamadpur महमदपुर
- City
- Location in Lumbini Province Mahamadpur (Nepal)
- Country: Nepal
- Province: Lumbini Province
- District: Bardiya District

Population (1991)
  - Total: 8,191
- Time zone: UTC+5:45 (Nepal Time)

Mahamadpur is a Village Development Committee in Bardiya District in Lumbini Province of south-western Nepal. At the time of the 1991 Nepal census it had a population of 8,191 and had 1152 houses in the town.
