= Dhadhawar =

Village development committee in Lumbini Province, Nepal

Dhadhawar धधवार
- Village development committee
- Location in Lumbini Province Dhadhawar (Nepal)
- Coordinates: 28.29°N 81.42°E
- Country: Nepal
- Province: Lumbini Province
- District: Bardiya District

Population (1991)
  - Total: 12,693
- Time zone: UTC+5:45 (Nepal Time)

Dhadhawar is a village development committee in Bardiya District in Lumbini Province of south-western Nepal. At the time of the 1991 Nepal census it had a population of 12,693 and had 1741 houses in the town.
