= Gola, Nepal =

Gola, Nepal गोला
- Village development committee
- Location in Lumbini Province Gola, Nepal (Nepal)
- Coordinates: 28.52°N 81.22°E
- Country: Nepal
- Province: Lumbini Province
- District: Bardiya District

Population (1991)
  - Total: 5,340
- Time zone: UTC+5:45 (Nepal Time)

Gola, Nepal is a village development committee in Bardiya District in Lumbini Province of south-western Nepal. At the time of the 1991 Nepal census it had a population of 5,340 and had 694 houses in the town.
