= Baniyabhar =

Baniyabhar बानियाभार
- Village development committee
- Location in Lumbini Province Baniyabhar (Nepal)
- Coordinates: 28.37°N 81.35°E
- Country: Nepal
- Province: Lumbini Province
- District: Bardiya District

Population (2011)
  - Total: 17,682
- Time zone: UTC+5:45 (Nepal Time)

Baniyabhar is a village development committee in Bardiya District in Lumbini Province of south-western Nepal. At the time of the 2011 Nepal census it had a population of 17,682 people living in 3,561 individual households. There were 8,571 males and 9,111 females at the time of census.
