= Neulapur =

Neulapur नेउलापुर
- Village development committee
- Location in Lumbini Province Neulapur (Nepal)
- Coordinates: 28.45°N 81.31°E
- Country: Nepal
- Province: Lumbini Province
- District: Bardiya District

Population (1991)
  - Total: 8,194
- Time zone: UTC+5:45 (Nepal Time)

Neulapur is a village development committee in Bardiya District in Lumbini Province of south-western Nepal. At the time of the 1991 Nepal census it had a population of 8,194 and had 1053 houses in the town.

== Media ==
To Promote local culture Neulapur has two FM radio stations Phoolbari FM - 107.3 MHz and Radio Tiger FM - 88.2 MHz Which are Community radio Station.
