= Sanjay Kumar Gautam =

Nepali politician

Honourable Sanjay Kumar Gautam MP

Member of Parliament, Pratinidhi Sabha
- In office 4 March 2018 – 12 September 2025
- Preceded by: Shyam Prasad Dhakal
- Succeeded by: Thakur Singh Tharu
- Constituency: Bardiya 1

Member of Constituent Assembly
- In office 21 January 2014 – 14 October 2017
- Preceded by: Bishnu Prasad Chaudhary
- Succeeded by: Sant Kumar Tharu
- Constituency: Bardiya 2

Personal details
- Born: 26 April 1963 (age 63)
- Party: Nepali Congress

Sanjay Kumar Gautam (Nepali: संजय कुमार गौतम) is a Nepalese politician who was Irrigation minister in Sher Bahadur Deuba's cabinet.

He was a member of the 2nd Nepalese Constituent Assembly. He won the Bardiya–2 seat in 2013 Nepalese Constituent Assembly election from the Nepali Congress. In 2022, he was re-elected from Bardiya 1 (constituency).
