= Rajapur, Nepal =

Rajapur राजापुर नगरपालिका
- Municipality
- Rajapur Municipality
- Motto(s): Nepali: कृषि, पर्यटन, उद्योग र भौतिक पूर्वाधार : समावेशी र समृद्ध राजापुरको मुल आधार
- Location in Nepal
- Coordinates: 28°26′N 81°05′E
- Country: Nepal
- Province: Lumbini
- District: Bardiya

Government
  - Mayor: Dipesh Tharu ( Maoist Centre)
  - Deputy Mayor: Manakala Kumari Chaudhary (NCP)

Population (1991)
  - Total: 9,545
- Time zone: UTC+5:45 (NST)
- Postal code: 21811
- Area code: 084
- Website: www.rajapurmun.gov.np

Rajapur is a municipality in Bardiya District in Lumbini Province of south-western Nepal. The municipality was established on 18 May 2014 merging the existing Daulatpur, Naya Gaun, Badalpur, Bhimapur, Manpur Tapara and Rajapur village development committees (VDCs). It is located on the border with Uttar Pradesh state, India. It has a customs checkpoint for goods. Indian and Nepalese nationals may cross the border without restriction.

At the time of the 1991 Nepal census it had a population of 9,545 and had 1,298 houses in the town.

== Demographics ==
At the time of the 2011 Nepal census, Rajapur Municipality had a population of 59,818. Of these, 77.8% spoke Tharu, 18.5% Nepali, 1.5% Hindi, 0.6% Maithili, 0.4% Sonaha, 0.3% Magar, 0.2% Awadhi, 0.2% Gurung, 0.2% Urdu, 0.1% Bhojpuri, 0.1% Newar and 0.1% other languages as their first language.

In terms of ethnicity/caste, 78.6% were Tharu, 5.6% Hill Brahmin, 4.2% Chhetri, 2.9% Kami, 1.5% Thakuri, 1.4% Musalman, 1.2% Damai/Dholi, 1.2% Magar, 0.5% Yadav, 0.4% Gurung, 0.4% Sanyasi/Dasnami, 0.3% Badi, 0.3% Lohar, 0.3% Newar, 0.3% Sarki, 0.2% Hajjam/Thakur, 0.1% Halwai, 0.1% Kalwar, 0.1% Kewat, 0.1% Kurmi, 0.1% other Terai and 0.1% others.

In terms of religion, 96.9% were Hindu, 1.4% Muslim, 1.3% Christian and 0.4% Buddhist.

In terms of literacy, 64.8% could read and write, 1.4% could only read and 33.8% could neither read and write.
