= Taratal =

Taratal ताराताल
- Village development committee
- Location in Nepal
- Coordinates: 28.27°N 81.27°E
- Country: Nepal
- Province: Lumbini Province
- District: Bardiya District

Population (1991)
  - Total: 7,401
- Time zone: UTC+5:45 (Nepal Time)

Taratal is a village development committee in Bardiya District in Lumbini Province of south-western Nepal. At the time of the 1991 Nepal census it had a population of 7,401 and had 1279 houses in the town.
