= Khairapur =

Khairapur खैरापुर
- Village development committee
- Country: Nepal
- Province: Lumbini Province
- District: Bardiya District

Population (1991)
  - Total: 6,568
- Time zone: UTC+5:45 (Nepal Time)

Khairapur is a town in Bardiya District in Lumbini Province of south-western Nepal. At the time of the 1991 Nepal census it had a population of 6,568 and had 1192 houses in the town.
