= Manpur Mainapokhar =

Mainapokhar मैनापोखर
- Village development committee
- Location in Lumbini Province Mainapokhar (Nepal)
- Coordinates: 28.19°N 81.48°E
- Country: Nepal
- Province: Lumbini Province
- District: Bardiya

Population (2016)
  - Total: 20,000
- Time zone: UTC+5:45 (Nepal Time)
- Area code: 084
- Website: www.mainapokhar.com

Mainapokhar is a village development committee in Bardiya District in Lumbini Province of south-western Nepal. At the time of the 1991 Nepal census it had a population of 6,841 and had 951 houses in the town. Now it reaches to nearly 20000 in 2016. It is nearly 20 km far from Nepalgunj.

It is near to local Indian Market Balegaun, which can be reached 5 km from Maiapokhar through Ranipur and Padariya.

== Religion ==
There are mostly Hindu People. They are greater in number than people of other religions (mainly Muslim).

== Tourist destination ==
Badhaiya Lake: a tourist destination where people from nearby places come for enjoyment. They can go boating and can have a variety of fish dishes. They can go cycling around the lake.

== Lifestyle ==
Temperature highly affects the lifestyle of Mainapokhar. Due to extreme heat in summer season, people wear light cotton clothes and rarely come out during the day time. While in the winter season, the temperature may drop to 4 °C during which people wear thick woollen clothes.

== Educational institutions ==
- Shree Shardha Higher Secondary School
- Bardiya Academy & Polytechnical Research Center, Tilkana
- River Queens School, Tilkana
- Krishnasar Vidhya Niketan
- Suvakamana Academy

== Nearby places ==
- Nepalgunj 25 km
- Bansgadi 7 km
- Gulariya 15 km

[1]
