= Padanaha =

Padanaha पदनाहा
- Village development committee
- Location in Lumbini Province Padanaha (Nepal)
- Coordinates: 28.30°N 81.34°E
- Country: Nepal
- Province: Lumbini Province
- District: Bardiya District

Population (1991)
  - Total: 7,186
- Time zone: UTC+5:45 (Nepal Time)

Padanaha is a village development committee in Bardiya District in Lumbini Province of south-western Nepal. At the time of the 1991 Nepal census it had a population of 7,186 and had 888 houses in the town.
