= Baganaha =

Baganaha बगनाहा
- Village development committee
- Location in Lumbini Province Baganaha (Nepal)
- Coordinates: 28.41°N 81.30°E
- Country: Nepal
- Province: Lumbini Province
- District: Bardiya District

Population (2011)
  - Total: 13,048
- Time zone: UTC+5:45 (Nepal Time)

Baganaha is a village development committee in Bardiya District in Lumbini Province of south-western Nepal. At the time of the 2011 Nepal census it had a population of 13,048 people living in 2,482 individual households. There were 6,188 males and 6,860 females at the time of census.
