= Naya Gaun, Bardiya =

Coordinates: 28°27′N 81°10′E

Naya Gaun नयाँगाउँ
- Location in Lumbini Province Naya Gaun (Nepal)
- Country: Nepal
- Province: Lumbini Province
- District: Bardiya District

Population (1991)
  - Total: 4,741
- Time zone: UTC+5:45 (Nepal Time)

Naya Gaun is a town and market place in Rajapur Municipality in Bardiya District in Lumbini Province of south-western Nepal. The former village development committee (VDC) was merged with Daulatpur, Naya Gaun, Badalpur, Bhimapur and Rajapur VDCs to form the new municipality on 18 May 2014. At the time of the 1991 Nepal census it had a population of 4,741 and had 544 houses in the town.
