= Durga Paudel =

Nepali politician

MP Durga Paudel
- दुर्गा पौडेल

Vice Chairperson of Rastriya Janamorcha
- Incumbent
- Assumed office 2016

Member of Parliament, Pratinidhi Sabha
- Incumbent
- Assumed office 4 March 2018
- Preceded by: Bam Dev Gautam
- Constituency: Pyuthan 1

Member of Constituent Assembly for Rastriya Janamorcha party list
- In office 21 January 2014 – 14 October 2017

Personal details
- Born: 21 September 1971 (age 54)
- Citizenship: Nepali
- Party: Rastriya Janamorcha
- Spouse: Mohan Bikram Singh

Durga Paudel (also Poudel; Nepali: दुर्गा पौडेल) is a Nepali politician and a member of the House of Representatives of the federal parliament of Nepal. She was elected under the first-past-the-post (FPTP) system, as a candidate from Rastriya Janamorcha and with the support of the left alliance, from Pyuthan 1. She defeated Dr. Govinda Raj Pokharel of Nepali Congress. She received 47,514 votes to Pokharel's 31,286. She was one of only six women to be elected to parliament under the FPTP system.

At the third national conference of Rastriya Janamorcha in 2016, she had been elected as one of the two vice chairs of the party.
