= Sorhawa =

Sorhawa सोर्हवा
- Village development committee
- Location in Nepal
- Coordinates: 28.20°N 81.52°E
- Country: Nepal
- Province: Lumbini Province
- District: Bardiya District

Population (1991)
  - Total: 8,930
- Time zone: UTC+5:45 (Nepal Time)

Sorhawa is a village development committee in Bardiya District in Lumbini Province of south-western Nepal. At the time of the 1991 Nepal census it had a population of 8,930 and had 1456 houses in the town.
