= Magaragadi =

BARBARDIYA बारबर्दिया
- BARBARDIYA MUNICIPALITY
- Location in Lumbini Province BARBARDIYA (Nepal)
- Coordinates: 28.34°N 81.41°E
- Country: Nepal
- Province: Lumbini Province
- District: Bardiya District

Population (1991)
  - Total: 13,327
- Time zone: UTC+5:45 (Nepal Time)

Barbardiya is a municipality in Bardiya District in Lumbini Province of south-western Nepal. At the time of the 1991 Nepal census it had a population of 13,327 and had 1741 houses in the town.
