= Kashi Paudel =

Nepalese politician

Personal details
- Party: Nepali Congress

Kashi Paudel (Nepali: काशी पौडेल) is a Nepalese politician. She was elected to the Pratinidhi Sabha in the 1999 election on behalf of the Nepali Congress.
