= Manau, Nepal =

Manau, Nepal मनाउ
- Village development committee
- Location in Lumbini Province Manau, Nepal (Nepal)
- Coordinates: 28.44°N 81.19°E
- Country: Nepal
- Province: Lumbini Province
- District: Bardiya District

Population (1991)
  - Total: 5,741
- Time zone: UTC+5:45 (Nepal Time)

Manau is a village development committee in Bardiya District in Lumbini Province of south-western Nepal. At the time of the 1991 Nepal census it had a population of 5,741 and had 833 houses in the town.
