= Communist Party of Nepal (Marxist–Leninist) (1998) =

Communist Party of Nepal (Marxist–Leninist) नेपाल कम्युनिष्ट पार्टी (मार्क्सवादी-लेनिनवादी)
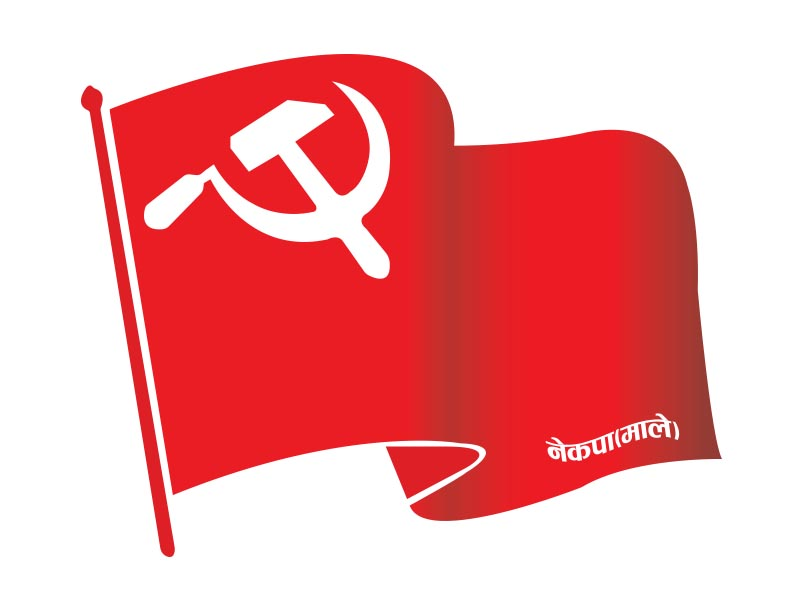
- General Secretary: Bam Dev Gautam
- Founded: 5 March 1998
- Dissolved: 15 February 2002
- Split from: Communist Party of Nepal (Unified Marxist–Leninist)
- Merged into: Communist Party of Nepal (Unified Marxist–Leninist)
- Headquarters: Rudranagar Marg-359, Ratopul, Kathmandu, Nepal
- Ideology: Communism; Marxism–Leninism
- Political position: Left-wing
- Colours: red

Election symbol

The Communist Party of Nepal (Marxist–Leninist) was a political party in Nepal and a splinter group from the Communist Party of Nepal (Unified Marxist–Leninist) formed on March 5, 1998. Sahana Pradhan was the chair of the party and Bam Dev Gautam the general secretary.

== History ==
Within the CPN (UML) a power struggle had taken place after the death of Madan Bhandari. Gautam and Pradhan advocated a tactical alliance with the Rastriya Prajatantra Party, which the CPN (UML) general secretary Madhav Kumar Nepal opposed. Moreover, the CPN (ML) opposed the Mahakali river treaty with India. The CPN (ML) described the split in the following wordings in the manifesto: "[The] CPN-ML was born as a result of revolt by revolutionary and patriotic force against national capitalist, and liquidationist policies and programmes of the CPN-UML. This was not the revolt for the sake of revolt; it was the revolt to restructure and re-organise the communist movement based on the principles of revolutionary Marxism."

CPN (ML) won over the majority of the party membership in the Kathmandu Valley and almost half of the parliamentary group of CPN (UML).. From September to December that year, the CPN (ML) took part in the government led by Girija Prasad Koirala.

In the 1999 parliamentary elections, the CPN (ML) got 6.4% of the votes nationwide, but failed to win a single seat. The division of the communists directly contributed to the electoral victory of the Nepali Congress, which had fewer votes than the CPN (ML) and CPN (UML) combined.

In January 2002, the CPN (ML) formed a three-member team to negotiate re-unification with the CPN (UML). The team was headed by R.K. Mainali. On February 15, 2002, the CPN (ML) reunified with the CPN (UML); however, C. P. Mainali, an important party leader, refused to go along and reconstituted his own CPN (ML).

== Electoral performance ==
=== Nepalese legislative elections ===
Election	Leader	Votes		Seats	Resulting government
Election	Leader	#	%	Seats	Resulting government
1999	Bam Dev Gautam	567,987	6.59	0	Nepali Congress

== See also ==
- List of communist parties in Nepal
