= Bardiya District =

District in Lumbini Province, Nepal

Coordinates: 28°49′0″N 80°29′0″E

Bardiya District बर्दिया
- District
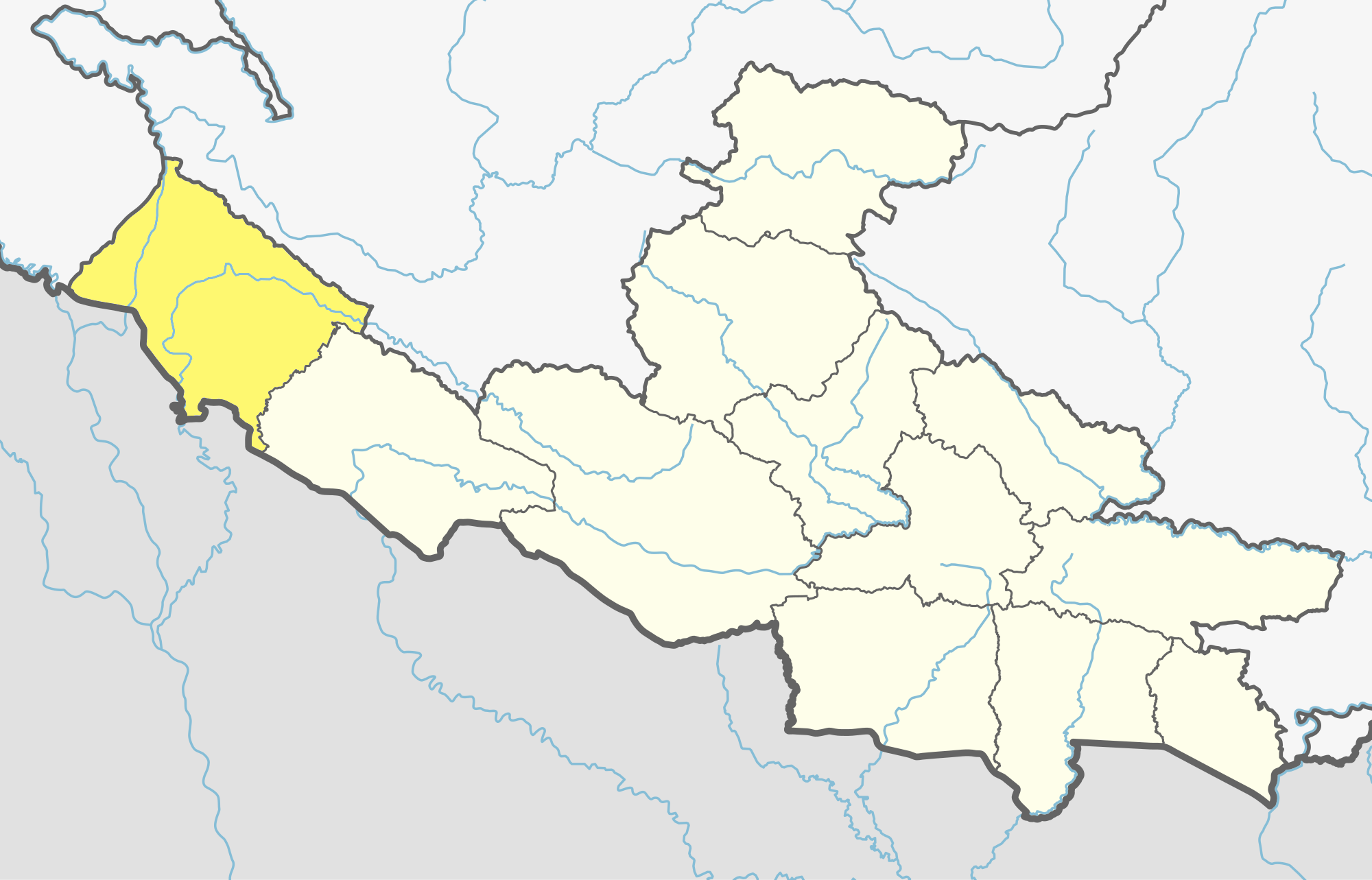
- Location of Bardiya (dark yellow) in Lumbini province
- Country: Nepal
- Province: Lumbini Province
- Admin HQ.: Gulariya

Government
  - Type: Coordination committee
  - Body: DCC, Bardiya

Area
  - Total: 2,025 km^{2} (782 sq mi)

Population (2011)
  - Total: 426,576
  - Density: 210.7/km^{2} (545.6/sq mi)
- Time zone: UTC+05:45 (NPT)
- Telephone Code: 084
- Main language(s): Tharu, Nepali, Awadhi

Bardiya District (Nepali: बर्दिया जिल्ला), one of the seventy-seven Districts of Nepal, is part of Lumbini Province of Nepal. The district, with Gulariya as its headquarters, covers an area of 2,025 km^{2} (782 sq mi) and according to the 2001 census the population was 382,649 in 2011 it has 426,576.Bardiya district includes Bardiya national park,Krishnasar conservation area making it hub for tourism.

== Geography and climate ==
Bardiya lies in Lumbini Province in midwestern Nepal. It covers 2025 square kilometers and lies west of Banke District, south of Surkhet District of Karnali Province, east of Kailali District of Sudurpashchim Province. To the south lies Uttar Pradesh, India.

Most of Bardiya is in the fertile Terai plains, covered with agricultural land and forest. The northernmost part of the district extends into the Churiya or Siwalik Hills. Bardiya National Park covers 968 km^{2} (374 sq mi) occupies most of the northern half of the district. This park is the largest undisturbed wilderness in Nepal's Terai. It provides forest, grassland and riverine habitat for endangered mammal, bird and reptile species. More than 30 species of mammals and more than 250 of birds have been recorded.

Most people living in this district are farmers. The district headquarter Gulariya lies on the Babai River. The Karnali, one of Nepal's largest rivers, divided into multiple branches when it reaches the Terai. The westernmost branch forms the boundary between Bardiya and Kailali districts. An eastern branch is called the Geruwa. The endangered Gangetic dolphin was often seen in its waters, but populations have been declining.

Climate zone	Elevation range	% of area
Lower tropical	below 300 meters (1,000 ft)	71.4%
Upper tropical	300 to 1,000 meters 1,000 to 3,300 ft.	22.6%
Subtropical	1,000 to 2,000 meters 3,300 to 6,600 ft.	2.7%

== History ==
Nepal lost it to the East India Company after Anglo-Nepalese war (1814–1816) between the then Kingdom of Nepal and East India Company followed by territorial concessions of Sugauli Treaty. Later during the administration of Jang Bahadur Rana, it was returned to Nepal along with Banke, Kailali and Kanchanpur. In the early twentieth century, Bardiya was still covered with forest and sparsely populated with indigenous tribal people called Tharu. Additional Tharus immigrated west from Dang and Deukhuri Valleys. Tharu from Dang and Deukhuri make up a majority of Bardiya's population. Other tribes called Sonaha live near the Karnali River and western periphery of Bardia National Park, who are historically engaged in extracting golden ores from sediments of river and fishing.

== Demographics ==
Historical population
Census year	Pop.	±% p.a.
1981	199,044	—
1991	290,313	+3.85%
2001	382,649	+2.80%
2011	426,576	+1.09%
2021	460,831	+0.78%
Source: Citypopulation

At the time of the 2021 Nepal census, Bardiya District had a population of 459,900. 8.10% of the population is under 5 years of age. It has a literacy rate of 76.85% and a sex ratio of 1122 females per 1000 males. 424,098 (92.22%) lived in municipalities.

Ethnic groups/castes in Bardiya district (2021)
1. Tharu (50.7%)
2. Chhetri (12.8%)
3. Bahun (7.13%)
4. Kami (6.28%)
5. Magar (3.01%)
6. Muslim (2.90%)
7. Thakuri (2.30%)
8. Yadav (2.00%)
9. Damai (1.88%)
10. Terai Brahmin (1.06%)
11. Lodh (0.99%)
12. Chamar (0.91%)
13. Other Madheshi non-Dalit (2.95%)
14. Other Hill Janjati (1.50%)
15. Other Madheshi Dalit (1.12%)
16. Others (2.54%)

Tharus make up a majority in the district, making up 51% of the population. Khas people make up 32% of the population, of which Khas Dalits are 9% of the population. Madheshi people are 9% of the population, and Hill Janjatis (mainly Magars) are 5% of the population.

Languages of Bardiya district (2021)
1. Tharu (50.4%)
2. Nepali (36.3%)
3. Awadhi (9.84%)
4. Others (3.49%)

At the time of the 2021 census, 50.41% of the population spoke Tharu, 36.26% Nepali and 9.84% Awadhi as their first language. In 2011, 35.2% of the population spoke Nepali as their first language.

Religion in Bardiya District (2021)
Religion	Percent
Hinduism	93.40%
Islam	3.12%
Christianity	2.71%
Buddhism	0.71%
Other or not stated	0.06%

== Administration ==
The district consists of eight municipalities, out of which six are urban municipalities and two are rural municipalities. These are as follows:

- Gulariya municipality
- Rajapur municipality
- Madhuwan municipality
- Thakurbaba municipality
- Basgadhi municipality
- Barbardiya municipality
- Badhaiyatal rural municipality
- Geruwa rural municipality

=== Former village development committees ===
Prior to the restructuring of the district, Bardiya District consisted of the following municipalities and Village development committees:

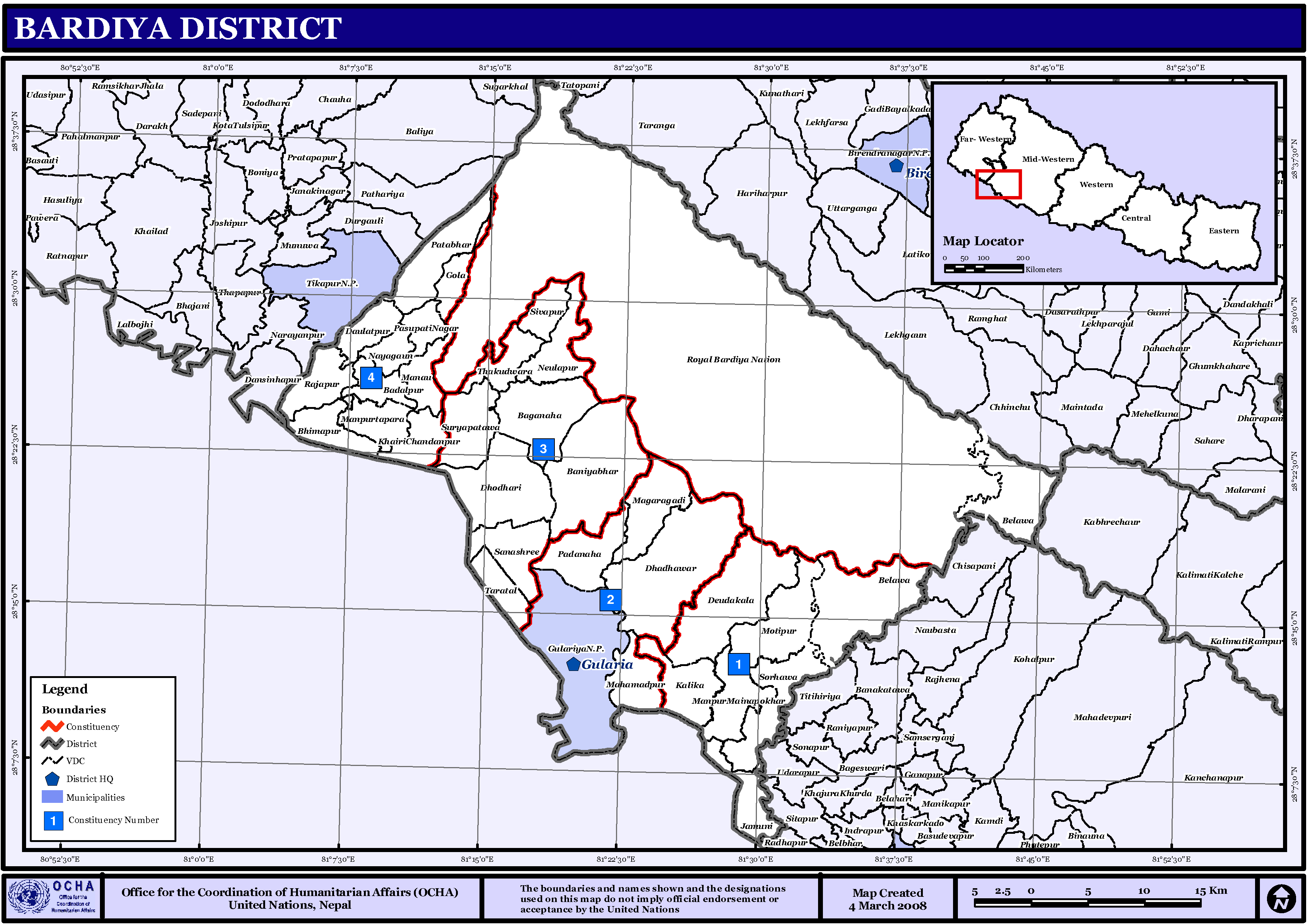
Map of the VDC/s and Municipalities (blue) in Bardiya District

- Badalpur Nepal
- Baganaha
- Baniyabhar
- Belawa
- Bhimapur
- Deudakala
- Dhadhawar
- Dhodhari
- Gola
- Jamuni
- Kalika
- Khairapur
- Khairi Chandanpur
- Magaragadi
- Mahamadpur
- Manau
- Manpur Mainapokhar
- Manpur Tapara
- Mathurahardwar
- Motipur
- Naya Gaun
- Neulapur
- Padanaha
- Pasupatinagar
- Patabhar
- Sanesri
- Shivapur
- Sorhawa
- Suryapatawa
- Taratal
- Thakudwara

== See also ==
- Zones of Nepal
- "Districts of Nepal". Statoids.
