= Islam in Nepal =

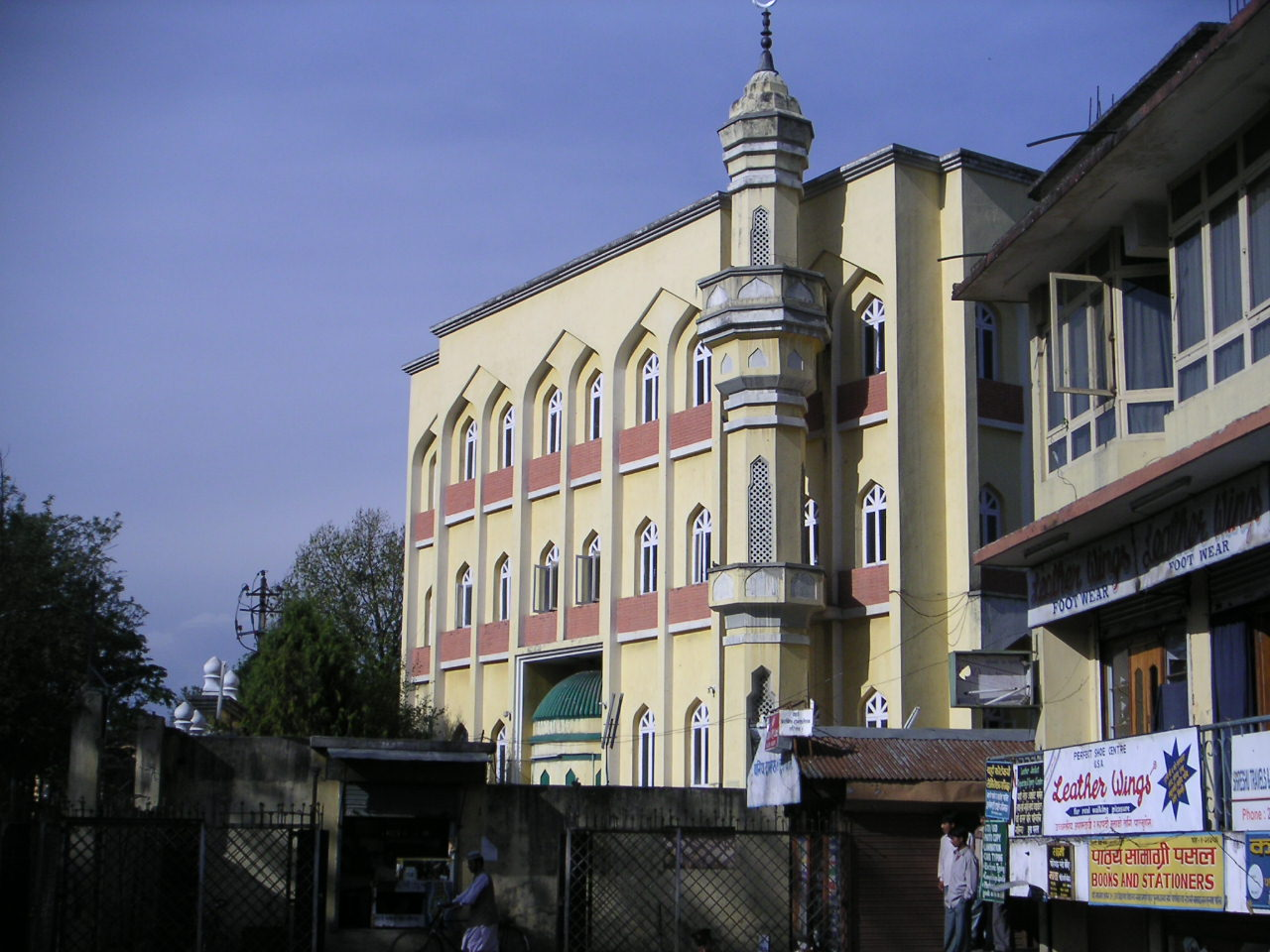
- Mosque in Kathmandu, Nepal

Total population
- 1,483,066 (5.09% of the country's population)▲

Regions with significant populations
- Madhesh: 811,878
- Lumbini: 381,558
- Koshi: 208,311
- Bagmati: 48,405
- Gandaki: 22,361
- Sudurpashchim: 6,983
- Karnali: 3,570

Religions
- Islam

Languages
- Urdu (27.9%) • Bhojpuri (19.9%) • Maithili (16.7%) • Awadhi (15.9%) • Bajjika (9.1%) • Nepali (5.2%) • Hindi (2.2%) • Magahi (0.9%) • Other regional languages (1.5%)

Islam (Nepali: नेपाली मुसलमान) is the third largest religion in Nepal. According to the 2021 Nepal census, approximately 1.483 million Muslims, comprising 5.09% of the population, live in Nepal.

== Demographics ==
According to the 2021 Nepal census, there are around 1.483 million Muslims in Nepal. Almost all of them live in Terai region. Districts with large Muslim concentrations are: Rautahat, Banke, Kapilvastu, Parsa, Mahottari, Bara, and Sunsari. There are only 26,339 Muslims in the capital city of Kathmandu (1.29% of the total population).

== Early Islam in Nepal ==
Islam is believed to have been introduced in Nepal as early as the 11th century through trade and migration routes from Kashmir, Tibet, and Northern India. The earliest Muslim settlers were primarily Kashmiri merchants and traders who established themselves in the Kathmandu Valley and other parts of the Terai region.

During the medieval period and particularly under the rule of the Malla kings, Muslims continued to arrive and engage in artisanal crafts, arms manufacturing, and trade. The Rana regime (1846–1951) further encouraged the settlement of Indian Muslims, particularly in the Terai belt, to strengthen agriculture and local economies.

A significant wave of migration occurred following the Indian Rebellion of 1857, as Muslim refugees from northern India sought asylum in neighboring Nepal. Many of these refugees were granted land and permission to settle by the ruling Rana regime.

Muslims played a small but notable role in Nepalese society during these times, including in the royal courts as metalworkers, arms suppliers, and scholars. Today, the historical roots of Islam in Nepal remain reflected in old settlements, mosques, and family lineages across Kathmandu, Nepalgunj, and the Eastern Terai districts.

Ahmadis maintain a small presence in Nepal.

Historical Muslim Population in Nepal
Year	Pop.	±%
1952/54	209,718	—
1961	280,507	+33.8%
1971	351,301	+25.2%
1981	399,607	+13.8%
1991	652,735	+63.3%
2001	972,359	+49.0%
2011	1,162,370	+19.5%
2021	1,483,060	+27.6%
Source: Nepal Censuses

The Muslim population was 1,483,060 as per Nepal 2021 Official census which make up 5.09% of Nepal's population. The Muslim population increased from 4.39% in 2011 to 5.09% in 2021.

Decadal percentage of Muslims in Nepal
Year	Percent	Increase
1952/54	2.54%	
1961	2.98%	▲ +0.44%
1971	3.04%	▲ +0.06%
1981	2.66%	▼ -0.38%
1991	3.53%	▲ +0.87%
2001	4.20%	▲ +0.67%
2011	4.39%	▲ +0.19%
2021	5.09%	▲ +0.70%

Projected Muslim population in Nepal (2030-2050)
Year	Population	%
2030	2.2 million	5.5%
2040	2.7 million	6%
2050	3.2 million	6.6%

Islam is the fastest-growing religion in Nepal. The Pew Research Center has estimated that Nepal will have 3.34 million Muslims by 2050 who will constitute roughly around 7% of the country's population, thus surpassing Buddhism in Nepal which is currently the 2nd largest religion in Nepal as of 2021 Nepal census reports.

== See also ==
- Nepalese Muslims
- Religion in Nepal
- Islam in South Asia
- List of mosques in Nepal
