= Nepalese Muslims =

Religious community

Nepalese Muslims नेपाली मुसलमान
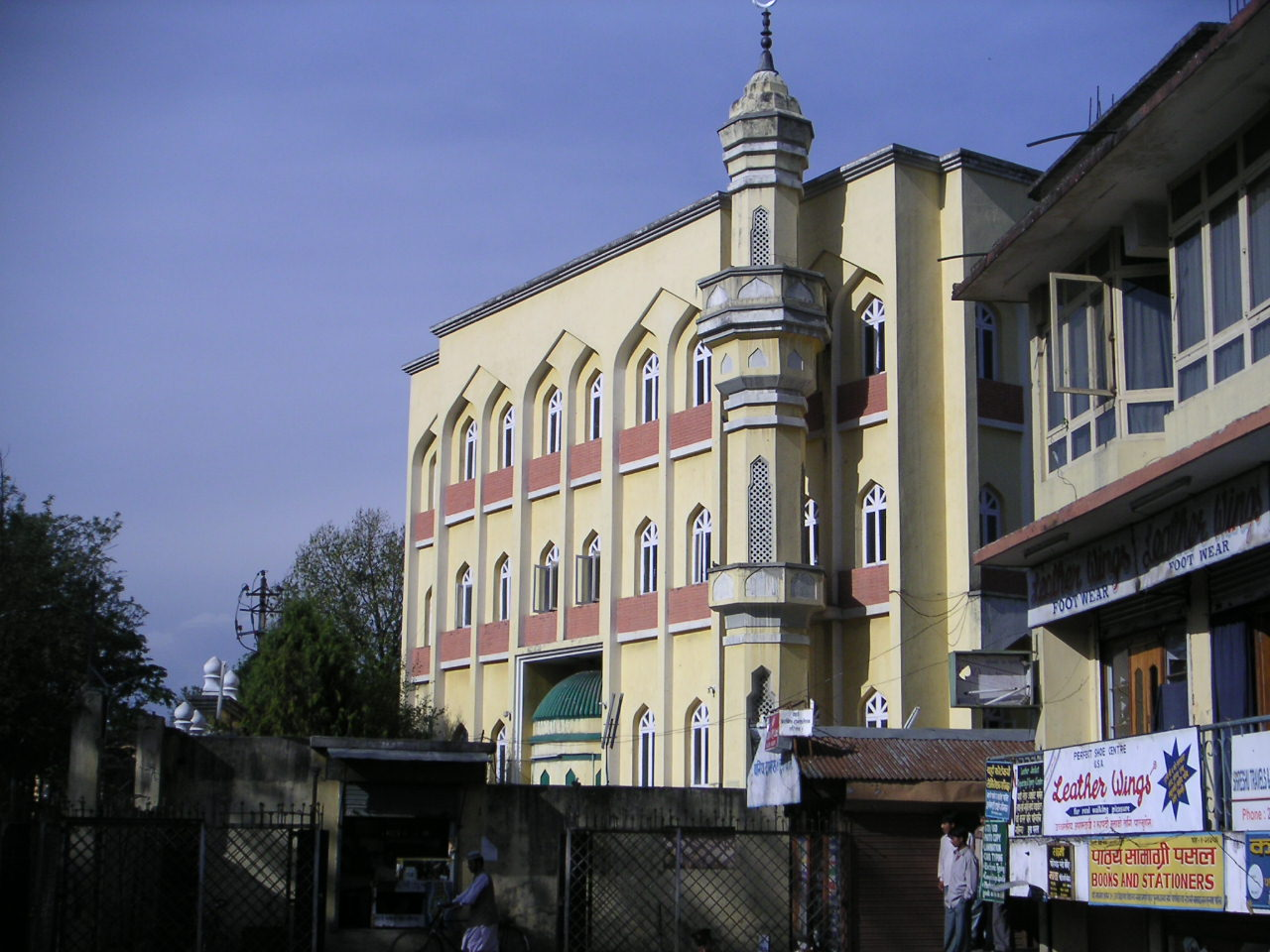
- Kashmiri Masjid, Kathmandu

Total population
- ▲1,483,066 (5.09% of Nepal's population)

Regions with significant populations
- Madhesh: 811,878
- Lumbini: 381,558
- Koshi: 208,311
- Bagmati: 48,405
- Gandaki: 22,361
- Sudurpashchim: 6,983
- Karnali: 3,570

Religions
- Islam

Languages
- Urdu (27.9%) • Bhojpuri (19.9%) • Maithili (16.7%) • Awadhi (15.9%) • Bajjika (9.1%) • Nepali (5.2%) • Hindi (2.2%) • Magahi (0.9%) • Other regional languages (1.5%)

Nepalese Muslims (Note: Nepali: नेपाली मुसलमान) are followers of Islam and form one of the religious communities in Nepal. Islam is the third-largest religion in Nepal after Hinduism and Buddhism, with 5.09% of the country's population, around 1,483,066 (1.483 million) people, identifying as Muslims in the 2021 census. Most of Nepal's Muslims live in the Terai (lowland) region, particularly in the southern plains close to the border with India. Muslims are classified as an ethnic group and considered untouchable in Nepali's social caste hierarchy.

About 80% of the Muslim community live in the Terai (lowland) region, while the other 20% are found mainly in the big cities like Kathmandu. The community numbers 1,483,066 (1.48 million) about 5.09% of the total population of Nepal according to 2021 Census. According to 2021 Census, districts with large Muslim population mainly include Terai (lowland) regions, such as: Banke (19.2%), Kapilvastu (18.2%), Rupandehi (8.3%), Parsa (14.5%), Bara (14.4%), Rautahat (19.7%), and Sarlahi (7.9%) in the western Terai and Mahottari (13.4%), Dhanusha (8.4%), Siraha (7.5%), Saptari (8.9%) and Sunsari (11.5%) in the eastern Terai.

== History ==
Muslims have lived in Nepal for long period of time and have shared common historical experiences with the Hindu majority, and as such have developed a stronger identification with the Nepali state. However, the Terai Muslims, on the other hand, like other Terai communities, also continue to have strong ties across the border and receive cultural sustenance from the larger Muslim population of Uttar Pradesh and Bihar. Historians believe that the first Muslims settled in Kathmandu during King Ratna Malla's reign in the late 15th century. These Muslims were Kashmiri merchants that were given permission by Ratna Malla to settle in Kathmandu.

The Chaubise rajas of west Nepal also employed Afghan and Indian Muslims to train Nepali soldiers to use firearms and ammunition. Ratna Malla's envoy to Lhasa invited Kashmiri Muslims to Kathmandu in an attempt to profit from the rugs, carpets, shawls and woollen goods they traded between Kashmir, Ladakh, and Lhasa. The first batch of Muslims came with a Kashmiri saint who built the first mosque, Kashmiri Taquia, in 1524, writes Shamima Siddika in her book Muslims of Nepal.

Influenced by the system of Mughal courts in Delhi, the Mallas also invited Indian Muslims to work as courtiers and counsellors, leading to rivalry with Newar nobles of the Malla courts. While the Muslim courtiers did not last long and returned to India, other Muslims stayed on. The Mallas also got Indian Muslims from the Mughal Empire to join their courts as musicians and specialists on perfumes and ornaments. Historian Baburam Acharya believes they were also there to protect King Ratna Malla from rebellious relatives and senior court officials.

Following Nepal's unification, King Prithvi Narayan Shah also encouraged Muslim traders to settle down with their families. Besides trade, the Muslims from Afghanistan and India were experts in manufacturing guns, cartridges, and cannons, while others were useful in international diplomacy because of their knowledge of Persian and Arabic.

Many Muslims, especially Kashmiri traders, are said to have fled to India during the economic blockade that Prithvi Narayan Shah imposed on the Valley. Fearing persecution from a Hindu king due to their religion and their ties with the Mallas, the traders left despite assurances that they would come to no harm. By 1774, only a handful of Kashmiri merchants remained. Even so, Kashmiri traders proved to be a great help during the unification process. Historians say that Prithvi Narayan Shah employed them as spies and informants as they had personal contacts with the Malla rulers. After his victory, he gave them permission to build a mosque, now near Tri-Chandra Campus (Nepali Jame Masjid, Ghantaghar).

During Jang Bahadur Rana's regime, a large number of Muslims migrated to the Terai from India fleeing persecution by the British army during the Sepoy Mutiny in 1857. These refugees settled in the Terai region, selling leather goods or working as agricultural labourers. A senior courtier to the Mughal Emperor Bahadur Shah Zafar also fled to Kathmandu. Later, he renovated the Jama Masjid and was buried there. During the Sepoy Mutiny, Begum Hazrat Mahal, wife of Nawab Wajid Ali Shah of Lucknow, also escaped to Kathmandu via Nepalganj and was allowed by Jang Bahadur to take refuge in Nepal. She settled down at the Thapathali Durbar and later died in Kathmandu and was also buried at the Nepali mosque.

== Classification ==
The history of the Muslim community in Nepal is in fact the history of four distinct groups, the Tibetans, Hindustanis, Kashmiris, and Madheshis. Muslims are treated as an ethnicity rather than a religious group in Nepal.

=== Newar Muslims ===
A small number of Newars in the Kathmandu Valley identify as Muslims, commonly referred to as Newar Muslims. While the majority of Newars follow Hinduism or Buddhism, this minority practices Islam while continuing to speak Nepal Bhasa and participate in elements of Newar social life. The community is primarily concentrated in areas such as Kathmandu, Bhaktapur, and Lalitpur. Despite their distinct religious identity, Newar Muslims are generally integrated into the broader Newar society and maintain cultural ties within the community.

=== Kashmiri Muslims ===
According to the Vamshavalis, Kashmiri Muslims arrived in Kathmandu during the reign of King Rama Malla (1484-1520 AD). They built a mosque, the Kashmiri Takia, and engaged in different occupations such as scribes to correspond with the Delhi Sultanate, and as scent manufacturers, musicians, and bangle suppliers. Some were admitted as courtiers to the Malla durbar, and many traded with Tibet. The descendants of these migrants live in Kathmandu, numbering about two thousand. They tend to be well-educated and speak a mixture of Nepali and Urdu at home rather than Kashmiri.

=== Tibetan Muslims ===
Muslim migrants of Tibetan origin include both Ladakhis and those from Tibet proper. The latter arrived mostly after the Chinese Communist takeover in 1959, and in their language and dress these Tibetan Muslims are indistinguishable from their Tibetan Buddhist counterparts. Today, many are engaged in the trade of Chinese consumer durables and selling curios. On the whole, this groups tends to be more affluent than the other Muslim communities.

The story of the Tibetan Muslims is that of a unique community, that has blended different cultural strains to forge a distinct identity, that has been kept alive even in the face of adversity. According to the community's traditions, Islam arrived almost a thousand years ago in Tibet, a region that has always been synonymous with a monolithic Buddhist culture. Sometime in the 12th century, it is believed, a group of Muslim traders from Kashmir and Ladakh came to Tibet as merchants. Many of these traders settled in Tibet and married Tibetan women, who later converted to the religion of their husbands. Author Thomas Arnold, in his book, The Preaching of Islam says that gradually, marriages and social interactions led to an increase in the Tibetan Muslim population until a sizable community came up around Lhasa, Tibet's capital.

=== Madhesi Muslims ===
While the smaller groups provide diversity, the largest community of Islam adherents, more than 74 percent of the Muslims are found in the Madhesh region, a narrow Terai plain lying between the lower hills of the Himalaya and the border with India. Concentrated in the Madhesh districts of Banke, Kapilvastu, Rupandehi, Parsa, Bara, and Rauthat, some of the Madhesi Muslims were present here at the time of Nepal's unification while others migrated from India, Pakistan, Afghanistan, Turkey, Arabia, Tibet, and Egypt from the 19th century onwards as wage labourers. While most are small-time proprietor farmers, a substantial number still work as tenants and agricultural labourers. At home they do speak Urdu, but also Awadhi, Bhojpuri, Maithili, and Nepali, depending on whether they are of the Western or Central or Eastern Madhesh.

The Muslim society in the Madhesh (Terai) region is organized along the principles of caste, but differs in many respects from the caste system found among the Madhesi Nepali Hindus. Although Muslim groupings are endogamous, and there are elements of hierarchy, there are no religious and ideological principles providing a foundation for the concept of caste. For example, there is no question of ritual pollution by touch or restriction on interdining. But each grouping does maintain a separate and distinct identity, especially with regard to intermarriage. Below is a brief description of the larger groupings:

Members of Madhesh-based Muslim communities reside in the Kathmandu valley and are the leaders of a revival and reform of Islam informed by global Islamist discourses and enabled and promoted by petrodollars and new technologies of communication linking them with Muslims communities around the world. The movement has both religious and political dimensions (though the two intertwine significantly in Islam), each represented by distinct organizations with their internal hierarchies and rules for membership. They provide scholarships for Muslim youth, support for mosques and madrasas, and religious trainings. These organizations have centers in the Terai as well, but the national centers are in the Kathmandu valley. Their ideological influences range from the Muslim Brotherhood, to Salafism, to the Jamaat-e Islami.

=== Churaute ===
The Churaute or Churauti (चाउराते) are a distinct, indigenous Muslim community in Nepal, known historically as "Hill Muslims"(पहाड़ी मुस्लिम) or bangle sellers, originating from the Gorkha, Tanahu, Syangja areas, primarily selling glass bangles (chura) and cosmetics in central/western hills, speaking Nepali, and practicing Sunni Islam, often living somewhat on the cultural margins but engaging with broader Nepali society.

== Notable people ==
- Basir Ahamad - Nepali cricketer. He made his Twenty20 debut on 1 May 2022, for Nepal against Zimbabwe A.
- Mehboob Alam-Nepalese cricketer & is a world record holder who has his name in the Guinness World Records for single-handedly bowling out an opponent, which he did by picking up 10 wickets for 12 runs in 7.5 overs bundling out Mozambique for just 19 runs during the 2008 ICC World Cricket League Division Five in Jersey.
- Shahab Alam-Nepalese cricketer. He represents the Nepal Army Club in domestic cricket.
- Mohna Ansari - Human rights activist, and Nepal's only female attorney from the Muslim community.
- Najir Hussain - the only Nepali Muslim Actor in the film industry.
- Abdul Khan - Nepalese politician, belonging to the Janamat Party. He is currently serving as a member of the 2nd Federal Parliament of Nepal.
- Rashid Khan-Nepalese cricketer. He Belong to team Lalitpur Patriots of Nepal's Premier League called 2021 Everest Premier League.
- Lalbabu Raut-Also Known as Mohammad Lalbabu Raut is the first Chief Minister of Madhesh Province, one of the seven federal provinces of Nepal.He is the parliamentary party leader of People's Socialist Party, Nepal for Madhesh Province
- Asif Shah -Nepalese TV presenter, director, producer, actor, singer, and rapper.
- Aarif Sheikh - Nepali cricketer, the vice-captain of the Nepal national under-19 cricket team.
- Aasif Sheikh - Nepali wicket-keeper batter who won the ICC Spirit of Cricket award while playing against Ireland.

== See also ==
- Islam in Nepal
- List of mosques in Nepal
- Religion in Nepal
