= List of protected areas of Nepal =

Protected areas in Nepal

The protected areas of Nepal are distributed across the country's diverse geographical regions, extending from the Terai lowlands in the south to the high mountains of Himalayas in the north. They encompass a wide range of natural landscapes and ecosystems, including tropical forests, grasslands, wetlands, valleys and snow-covered mountains. This ecological diversity supports a rich variety of rare and endangered plant and animal species from both the Palearctic and Indomalayan realms.

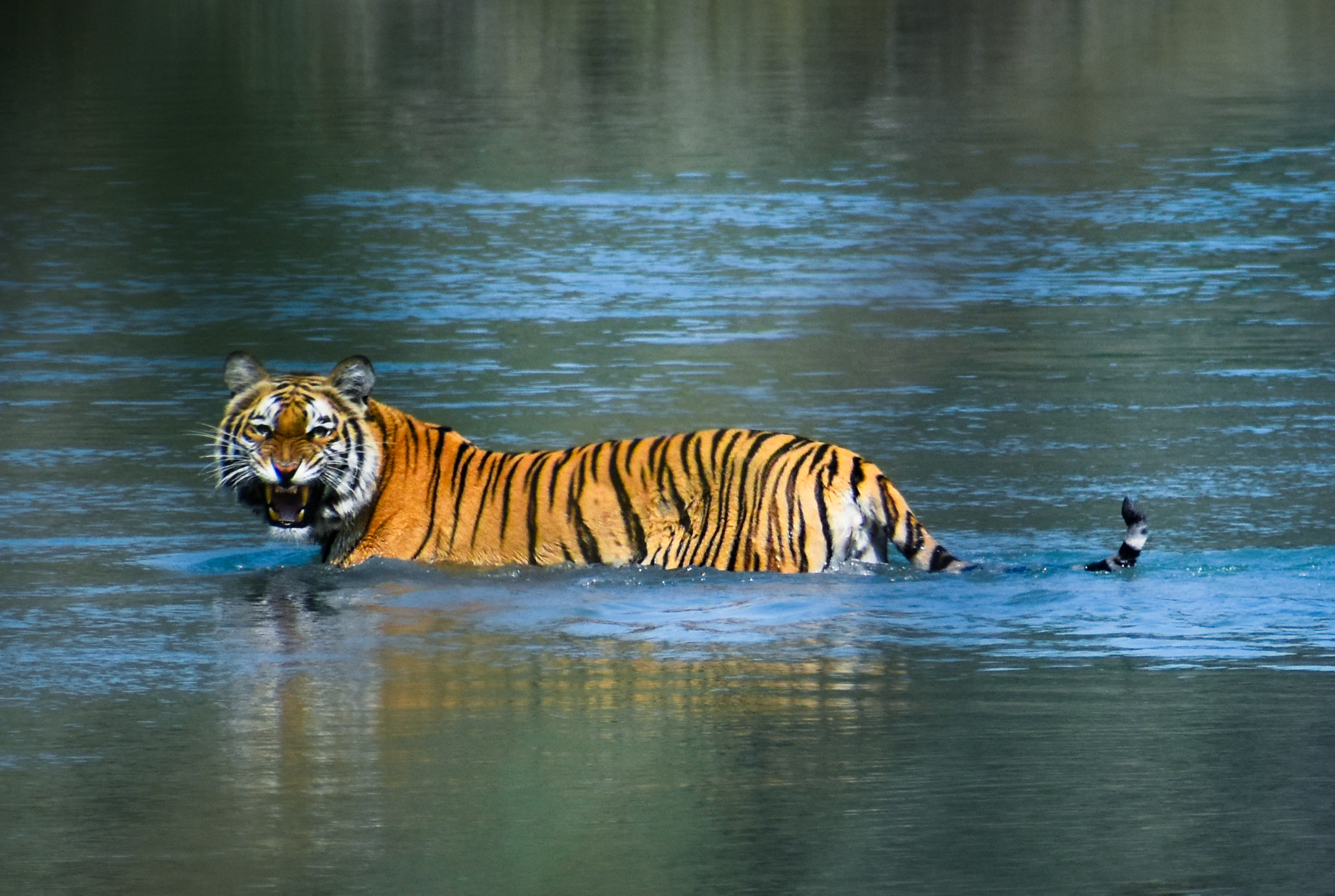
A Bengal tiger in Bardiya National Park

Nepal covers an area of 147,516 km^{2} (56,956 sq mi) in the central Himalayas with elevation ranging from 67 m (220 ft) in the south-eastern Terai to 8,848.86 m (29,031.7 ft) at Mount Everest within a short horizontal span. This extreme elevational gradient has resulted in 11 bio-climatic zones ranging from lower tropical climate zone below 500 m (1,600 ft) to the nival zone above 5,000 m (16,000 ft) in the high Himalayas, encompassing nine terrestrial ecoregions with 36 vegetation types.

Nepal's protected area network began with the establishment of Chitwan National Park in 1973 and has gradually expanded to include 13 national parks, a wildlife reserve, six conservation areas and a hunting reserve. In addition to the national protected area network, Nepal has designated ten wetlands as Ramsar sites and established several Forest Conservation Areas under the jurisdiction of provincial governments.

== Protected areas ==
Name	Image	Districts	Provinces	Size	Declaration	IUCN Category	Notes
National parks
Chitwan National Park		Chitwan, Nawalpur, Makwanpur, Parsa	Bagmati, Madhesh, Gandaki	952.63 km^{2} (367.81 sq mi)	1973	II	UNESCO World Heritage Site since 1984
Sagarmatha National Park		Solukhumbu	Koshi	1,148 km^{2} (443 sq mi)	19 July 1976	II	UNESCO World Heritage Site since 1979
Langtang National Park		Nuwakot, Rasuwa, Sindhupalchowk	Bagmati	1,710 km^{2} (660 sq mi)	1976	II	
Rara National Park		Mugu, Jumla	Karnali	106 km^{2} (41 sq mi)	1976	II	
Khaptad National Park		Bajhang, Bajura, Achham, Doti	Sudurpaschim	225 km^{2} (87 sq mi)	1984	II	
Shey Phoksundo National Park		Dolpa, Mugu	Karnali	2,712 km^{2} (1,047 sq mi)	1984	II	
Bardiya National Park		Bardiya	Lumbini	968 km^{2} (374 sq mi)	1988	II	
Makalu Barun National Park		Solukhumbu, Sankhuwasabha	Koshi	1,500 km^{2} (580 sq mi)	1992	II	
Shivapuri Nagarjun National Park		Kathmandu. Nuwakot, Sindhupalchowk	Bagmati	159 km^{2} (61 sq mi)	2002	II	
Banke National Park		Banke, Salyan, Dang	Lumbini	550 km^{2} (210 sq mi)	12 July 2010	II	
Shuklaphanta National Park		Kanchanpur	Sudurpaschim	305 km^{2} (118 sq mi)	1976 as Wildlife Reserve; 2017 as National Park	II	
Parsa National Park		Bara, Makwanpur, Parsa	Madhesh, Bagmati	637 km^{2} (246 sq mi)	1984 as Wildlife Reserve, 2017 as National Park	II	
Chhayanath National Park		Mugu	Karnali	906 km^{2} (350 sq mi)	4 September 2025	II	Newest national park of Nepal
Conservation areas
Annapurna Conservation Area		Manang, Mustang, Kaski, Myagdi, Lamjung	Gandaki	7,629 km^{2} (2,946 sq mi)	1992	VI	Largest protected area in Nepal by land area
Kanchenjunga Conservation Area		Taplejung	Koshi	2,035 km^{2} (786 sq mi)	1997	VI	
Manaslu Conservation Area		Gorkha	Gandaki	1,663 km^{2} (642 sq mi)	1998	VI	
Blackbuck Conservation Area		Bardiya	Lumbini	16.95 km^{2} (6.54 sq mi)	March 2009	VI	Smallest protected area in Nepal by land area
Api Nampa Conservation Area		Darchula	Sudurpashchim	1,903 km^{2} (735 sq mi)	2010	VI	
Gaurishankar Conservation Area		Ramechhap, Dolakha, Sindhupalchowk	Bagmati	2,197 km^{2} (848 sq mi)	10 January 2010	VI	
Wildlife reserve
Koshi Tappu Wildlife Reserve		Sunsari, Saptari, Udayapur	Koshi, Madhesh	175 km^{2} (68 sq mi)	1976	IV	Also a Ramsar Wetland since 1987
Hunting reserve
Dhorpatan Hunting Reserve		Eastern Rukum, Myagdi, Baglung	Gandaki, Lumbini	1,325 km^{2} (512 sq mi)	1987	VI	
Forest conservation areas
Kakrebihar Forest Conservation Area		Surkhet	Karnali	1.75 km^{2} (0.68 sq mi)	13 May 1994		
Dhanushadham Forest Conservation Area		Dhanusha	Madhesh	3.40 km^{2} (1.31 sq mi)	17 January 2005		
Madane Forest Conservation Area		Gulmi	Lumbini	137.61 km^{2} (53.13 sq mi)	28 February 2011		
Panchase Forest Conservation Area		Kaski, Syangja, Parbat	Gandaki	57.76 km^{2} (22.30 sq mi)	27 February 2012		
Barandabhar Forest Conservation Area		Chitwan	Bagmati	104.66 km^{2} (40.41 sq mi)	27 February 2012		
Khata Forest Conservation Area		Bardiya	Lumbini	57.42 km^{2} (22.17 sq mi)	27 February 2012		
Laljhadi-Mohana Forest Conservation Area		Kanchanpur, Kailali	Sudurpashchim	296.42 km^{2} (114.45 sq mi)	27 February 2012		
Basanta Forest Conservation Area		Kailali	Sudurpashchim	690.01 km^{2} (266.41 sq mi)	27 February 2012		
Resunga Forest Conservation Area		Gulmi	Lumbini	192.81 km^{2} (74.44 sq mi)	12 March 2018		
Thaple Satyabati Salimedaha Forest Conservation Area		Gulmi	Lumbini	378.43 km^{2} (146.11 sq mi)	13 March 2018		
Godawari Phulchowki Forest Conservation Area		Lalitpur, Kavrepalanchowk	Bagmati	21.28 km^{2} (8.22 sq mi)	16 June 2022		
Badimalika–Ramaroshan Forest Conservation Area		Bajura, Achham	Sudurpaschim	498.4 km^{2} (192.4 sq mi)	12 August 2026	IV	Newest forest conservation area of Nepal

== Ramsar wetlands ==
Name	Image	Districts	Provinces	Size	Declaration	Associated protected area	Notes
Ramsar Sites within protected areas
Koshi Tappu		Sunsari, Saptari, Udayapur	Koshi, Madhesh	175 km^{2} (68 sq mi)	17 December 1987	Koshi Tappu Wildlife Reserve	IUCN category IV protected area
Bishazari Tal		Chitwan	Bagmati	32 km^{2} (12 sq mi)	13 August 2003	Chitwan National Park	
Gokyo Lakes		Solukhumbu	Koshi	1.962 km^{2} (0.758 sq mi)	13 September 2007	Sagarmatha National Park	
Gosaikunda		Rasuwa	Bagmati	0.138 km^{2} (0.053 sq mi)	23 September 2007	Langtang National Park	
Phoksundo Lake		Dolpa	Karnali	4.85 km^{2} (1.87 sq mi)	23 September 2007	Shey Phoksundo National Park	
Rara Lake		Mugu	Karnali	10.61 km^{2} (4.10 sq mi)	23 September 2007	Rara National Park	
Ramsar Sites outside Protected Areas
Ghodaghodi Tal		Kailali	Sudurpashchim	25.63 km^{2} (9.90 sq mi)	13 August 2003	None	Bird Sanctuary since March 2022
Jagdishpur Reservoir		Kapilvastu	Lumbini	2.25 km^{2} (0.87 sq mi)	13 August 2003	None	
Mai Pokhari		Ilam	Koshi	0.9 km^{2} (0.35 sq mi)	20 October 2008	None	
Lake Cluster of Pokhara Valley		Kaski	Gandaki	261.1 km^{2} (100.8 sq mi)	2 February 2016	None	

== Other conservation-related institutions ==
The following institutions contribute to biodiversity conservation, research, education and the preservation of Nepal's natural heritage. However, unlike the protected areas listed above, these institutions are not necessarily designated as protected areas under Nepalese law and are presented separately for reference.

=== Botanical gardens ===
Name	Image	Location			Area	Elevation	Established	Notes
Name	Image	Local level	District	Province	Area	Elevation	Established	Notes
Botanical gardens
National Botanical Garden		Godawari Municipality	Lalitpur	Bagmati	82 ha (0.82 km^{2})	1,515 m (4,970 ft)	28 October 1962	
Brindavan Botanical Garden		Hetauda Sub-metropolitan City	Makwanpur	Bagmati	57 ha (0.57 km^{2})	405 m (1,329 ft)	1962	
Mountain Botanical Garden		Thaha Municipality	Makwanpur	Bagmati	65 ha (0.65 km^{2})	2,320 m (7,610 ft)	1965	
Tistung Botanical Garden		Thaha Municipality	Makwanpur	Bagmati	45 ha (0.45 km^{2})	1,900 ha (19 km^{2})	1965	
Dhitachaur Botanical Garden		Guthichaur Rural Municipality	Jumla	Karnali	4.5 ha (0.045 km^{2})	2,500 m (8,200 ft)	1980	
Mulpani Botanical Garden		Kapurkot Rural Municipality	Salyan	Karnali	5.5 ha (0.055 km^{2})	1,420 m (4,660 ft)	1990	
Maipokhari Botanical Garden		Sandakpur Rural Municipality	Ilam	Koshi	10.4 ha (0.104 km^{2})	2,121 m (6,959 ft)	1992	
Dhakeri Botanical Garden		Rapti-Sonari Rural Municipality	Banke	Lumbini	5.29 ha (0.0529 km^{2})	170 m (560 ft)	1996	
Dhanushadham Botanical Garden		Dhanushadham Municipality	Dhanusha	Madhesh	105 ha (1.05 km^{2})	107 m (351 ft)	1999	
Dewahariya Botanical Garden		Dhangadhi Sub-metropolitian City	Kailali	Sudurpashchim	100 ha (1.0 km^{2})	170 m (560 ft)	1999	
World Peace Biodiversity Garden		Pokhara Metropolitan City	Kaski	Gandaki	164.76 ha (1.6476 km^{2})	775–1,078 m (2,543–3,537 ft)	3 December 2013	
Other botanical institution
National Herbarium and Plant Laboratories		Godawari Municipality	Lalitpur	Bagmati	—	1,515 m (4,970 ft)	1961	

=== Zoological institution(s) ===
Name	Image	Location			Area	Established	Notes
Name	Image	Local level	District	Province	Area	Established	Notes
Central Zoo		Lalitpur Metropolitan City	Lalitpur	Bagmati	6 ha (15 acres)	1932	
