= Uttarganga =

Uttarganga (Birendranagar now) उत्तरगंगा
- Village development committee Now turned in Municipality
- Location in Nepal
- Coordinates: 28.58°N 81.58°E
- Country: Nepal
- Zone: Bheri Zone
- District: Surkhet District

Population (1991)
  - Total: 6,704
- Time zone: UTC+5:45 (Nepal Time)

Uttarganga was village development committee but now turned in Birendranagar Municipality of Surkhet District in the Bheri Zone of mid-western Nepal. At the time of the 1991 Nepal census it had a population of 6704 people living in 1260 individual households.

== Location ==
Uttarganga was in southern part of Birendranagar and western part of Latikoili. Uttarganga and Birendranagar was divided by little length of Karnali Highway from Mangal Gadhi to Bangheshimal. But they are adjusted each other to becoming Birendranagar Municipality. A lot of area of Uttarganga has cultivative area but with the growing population the area are becoming town and decreasing productive land.
