= Kakrebihar Forest Conservation Area =

Protected forest in Nepal

- Nepali: काँक्रे बिहार वन संरक्षण क्षेत्र
- Forest on the way to Kakrebihar Temple

- Location within Karnali Province Location within Nepal
- Location: Surkhet District, Karnali Province, Nepal
- Coordinates: 28.5644°N 81.6208°E
- Area: 175 ha (430 acres)
- Established: May 13, 1994
- Governing body: Department of Forests and Soil Conservation

Kakrebihar Forest Conservation Area (Nepali: काँक्रे बिहार वन संरक्षण क्षेत्र) is a protected forest in Surkhet District of Karnali Province, Nepal. It is recognised for its ecological, archaeological, historical, religious and cultural significance. The forest surrounds the archaeological site of Kakrebihar, a medieval Hindu-Buddhist temple complex situated on a hill within the forest.

The Department of Forests and Soil Conservation lists Kakrebihar as a forest conservation area covering 175 hectares. Its management objectives include the conservation of biodiversity, forest and water resources, and natural and religious heritage.

== Geography ==
Kakrebihar Forest Conservation Area is located in Birendranagar Municipality, Surkhet District, Karnali Province, Nepal. It covers approximately 175 hectares and is situated on Latikoili Hill, overlooking the Surkhet Valley.

== Archaeological and historical significance ==
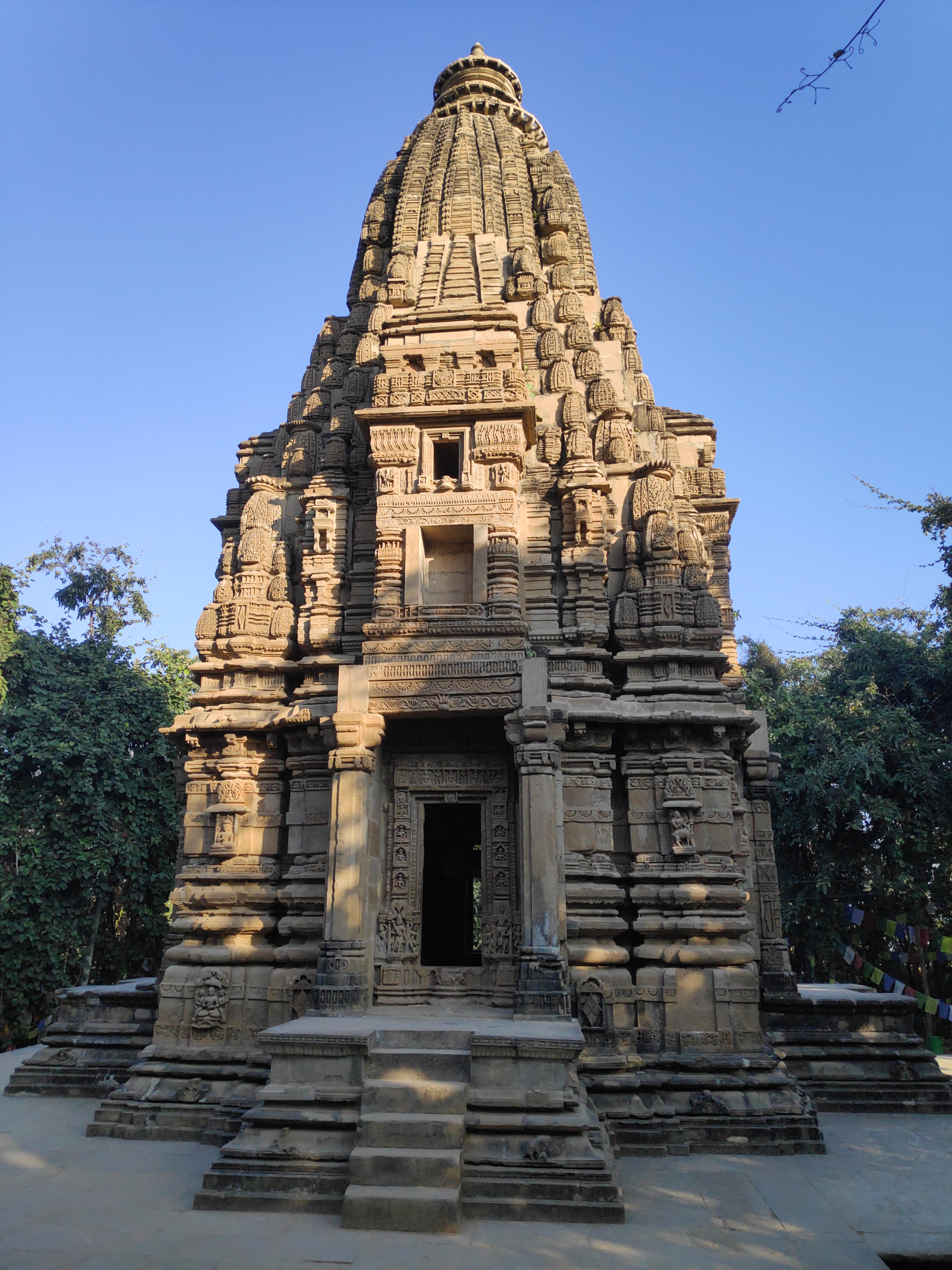
Kakrebihar Temple Complex

The Kakrebihar Temple Complex is situated within the forest. The medieval stone monument is built in the Shikhara architectural style and is associated with the history of the Khasa Malla Kingdom. The site contains carved stone sculptures and architectural fragments depicting Buddhist and Hindu religious figures. Archaeological research has discussed the site's architectural and religious significance in the context of medieval western Nepal.

The temple complex underwent restoration work during the 2010s. The reconstruction was reported by Nepali and international media.

Ruins at Kakrebihar

== Flora and fauna ==
The forest supports a range of plant and animal species. According to a report published in 2025, the area contains approximately 93 tree species, 25 types of mammals and 41 bird species, as well as fish, amphibians and reptiles.

=== Flora ===
The forest contains around 93 tree species. These include sal (Shorea robusta) and chir pine (Pinus roxburghii).

=== Fauna ===
The forest is home to approximately 25 types of mammals and 41 bird species. Mammals reported in the area include deer, rhesus macaques, rabbits and foxes. Birds found in the forest include peafowl and pheasants.

A study published in the Surkhet Journal recorded 33 butterfly species belonging to 24 genera and seven families in the Kakrebihar Forest Area. The family Nymphalidae was the most represented in the survey.

== Conservation ==
The forest faces pressures associated with its proximity to urban settlements, including the collection of forest resources and human-wildlife conflict. Wildlife from the forest has been reported entering nearby villages in search of water.

In 2025, a ten-year conservation action plan was prepared by the Department of Forests and Soil Conservation with technical support from the Environmental Forum for Research and Development Nepal. The plan covers the fiscal years 2025/26 to 2034/35 and focuses on the conservation and management of the forest's ecological, historical, archaeological, religious and cultural resources.

== See also ==
- List of protected areas of Nepal
- Birendranagar
- Kakrebihar
- Surkhet Valley
