= Chhayanath National Park =

National Park of Nepal

- Nepali: छायाँनाथ राष्ट्रिय निकुञ्ज
- IUCN category II (national park)
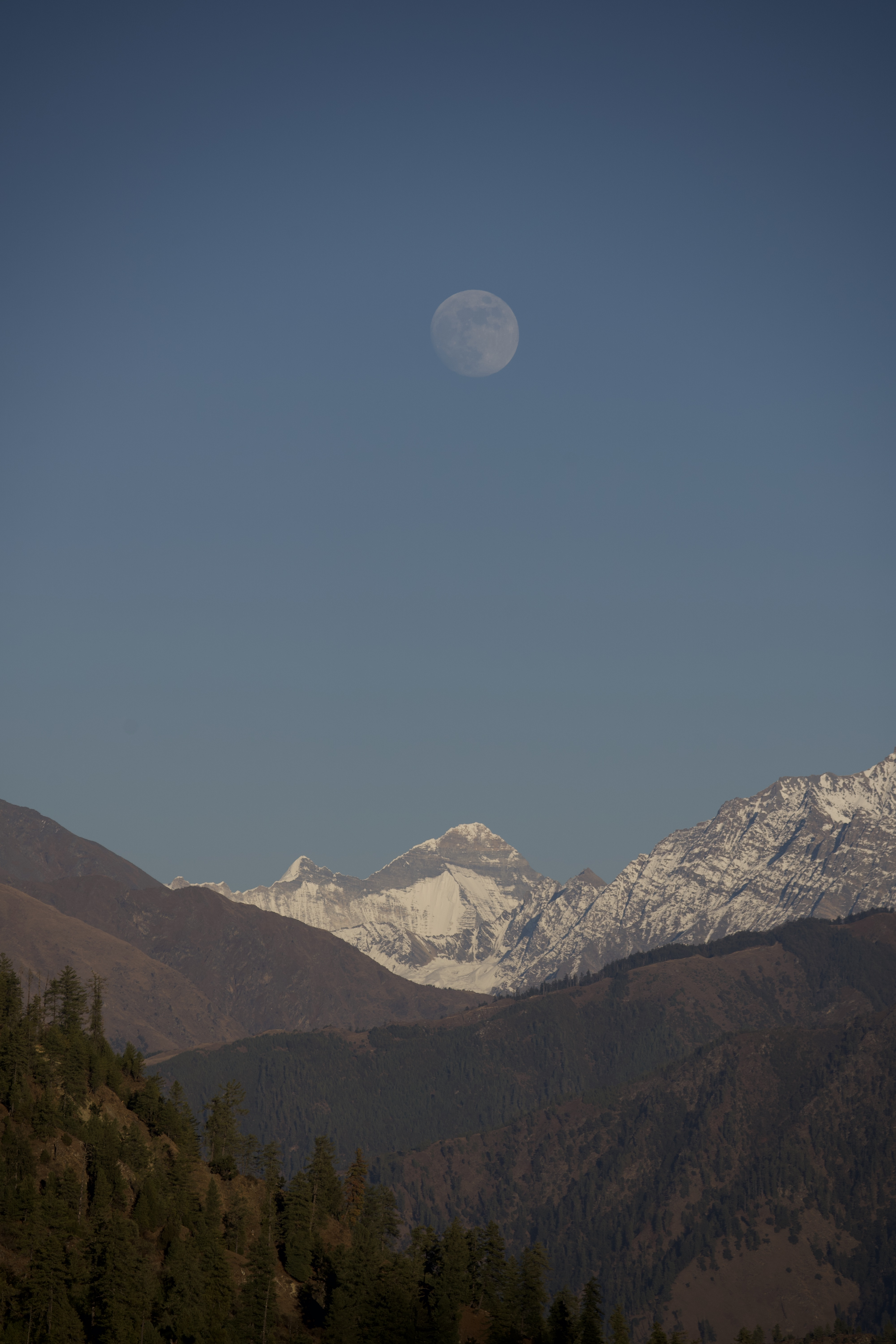

- Location within Karnali Province Location within Nepal Location within South Asia
- Interactive map of Chhayanath National Park
- Location: Nepal
- Nearest city: Gamgadhi
- Coordinates: 29°45′N 82°33′E
- Area: 843.36 km^{2} (325.62 sq mi)
- Established: August 29, 2025
- Governing body: Department of National Parks and Wildlife Conservation

Chhayanath National Park (Nepali: छायाँनाथ राष्ट्रिय निकुञ्ज) is a national park in the Mugu district of Karnali Province in Nepal. It covers an area of approximately 843.36 km^{2} (325.62 sq mi) surrounded by a buffer zone of area 177.37 km^{2} (68.48 sq mi). It was established on 29th August, 2025 as Nepal's 13th national park. Before its establishment, it was a part of Shey Phoksundo National Park. It is named after the Chhayanath temple in Chaingaun near Gamgadhi.

The park lies near the border with Tibet (China) and is surrounded by some of the most unique and untouched landspaces of Nepal. The park is home to endangered and protected animals such as snow leopards, blue sheep, Tibetan wild ass and Himalayan tahr. It is also home to Nepal's national bird Danphe and several other migratory birds.

== Flora ==
The park features a diverse vegetation of high altitude alpine tundra. The area is ecologically significant providing home to various medicinal and aromatic herbs like Yarsagumba, Jatamansi and Kutki.

== Fauna ==
The park is home to several exotic animals like snow leopards, blue sheep, Musk deer, Tibetan wild ass, wild yak, and several bird species like danphe, kalij pheasant, and also hosts several rare migratory birds during migration seasons.

== Culture ==
The park lies in one of the most remote parts of Nepal due to which it is home to some of the most unique and untouched cultures in the entire nation. People in and around the park follow Tibetan-influenced traditions. Agriculture and livestock herding is the main source of livelihood while the forests provide timber and medicinal herbs.
