= Birendranagar =

Municipality in Karnali Province, Nepal

Birendranagar वीरेन्द्रनगर
- Municipality
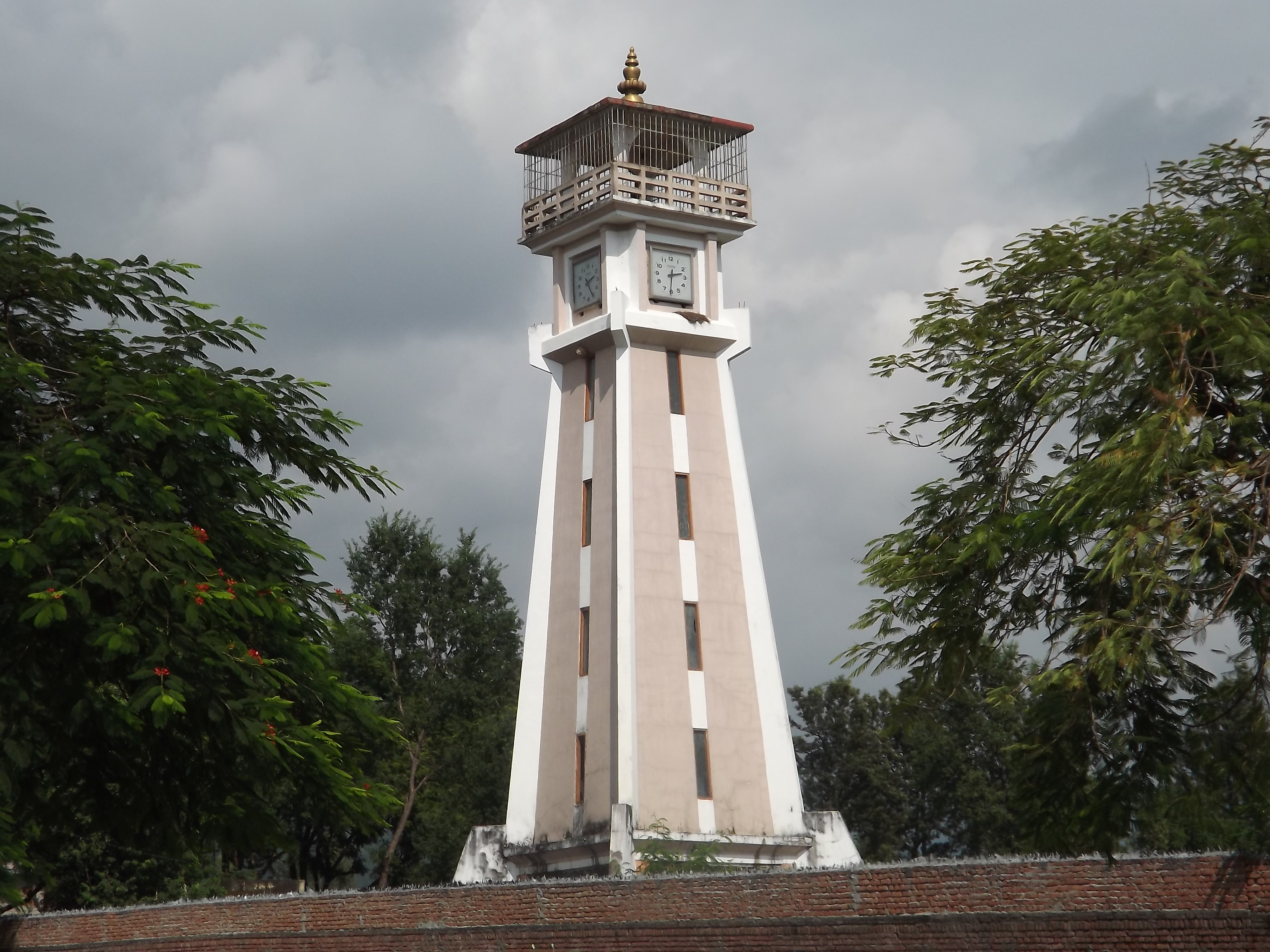
- Surkhet Ghantaghar

- Location in province Birendranagar (Nepal)
- Coordinates: 28°36′N 81°38′E
- Country: Nepal
- Province: Karnali
- District: Surkhet
- Established: 2033 BS (1976 AD)
- Named for: King Birendra

Government
  - Mayor: Maya Mohan Dhakal Bhandari (UML)
  - Deputy Mayor: Nilkantha khanal (UML)

Population (2021)
  - Total: 154,886
  - Rank: 17th
- Time zone: UTC+5:45 (NST)
- Postal code: 21700
- Area code: 083
- Website: birendranagarmun.gov.np

Birendranagar (Nepali: वीरेन्द्रनगर) officially Birendranagar Municipality is a city in Surkhet District in Karnali Province of Nepal. It is the capital city of Karnali province as well as the district headquarter of Surkhet district. As of March 2022, Birendranagar has a population of 154,886, making it the 17th most populous city of Nepal. Birendranagar is the largest city of Karnali province and 7th largest in Western Nepal. It is one of the fastest growing cities of Nepal and is on two national highways, Ratna Highway and Karnali Highway. It is one of the constituent city of the Ratna Highway Metropolitan Areas along with Nepalgunj and Kohalpur. Birendranagar compromises of panoramic view of Mahabharata and Chure ranges and the plain of the inner Terai. A major trade center in mid-western Nepal, Birendranagar is considered the most expensive city to live in Nepal.

In February 2018, the city was made the capital of the province of Karnali. At the 2011 census the city's population was 100,458 in 12,029 households. This city is located in the Surkhet Valley at the northern Bank of Bheri River which separates it from Bheriganga municipality. Birendranagar is named in honour of the late King Birendra, who planned and established it as the first planned town in Nepal.

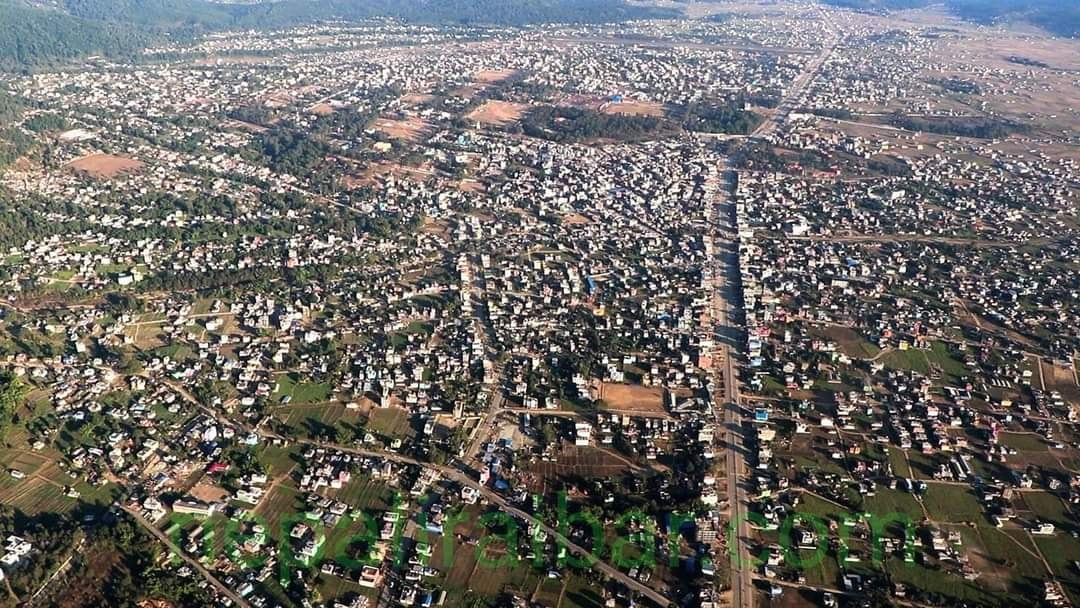
Birendranagar Skyline

Birendranagar is located in a valley and surrounded by hills. The Birendranagar municipality includes village development committee are Uttarganga, Latikoili.

== Demography ==
Historically, Birendranagar and the surrounding area of Surkhet were the lands of the Tharu and Local Rajhi; however the region has seen increased migration from the surrounding mountain regions as well as other parts of the country, although unstable political conditions have affected Birendranagar. The population of the city is approximately 55,000. Villagers from smaller surrounding communities migrate there in search of increased security and opportunity.

At the time of the 2011 Nepal census, Birendranagar Municipality had a population of 105,107. Of these, 85.2% spoke Nepali, 6.0% Magar, 5.8% Tharu, 0.6% Hindi, 0.6% Gurung, 0.5% Newar, 0.3% Belhare, 0.3% Maithili, 0.3% Urdu, 0.1% Bhojpuri, 0.1% Chantyal, 0.1% Raji and 0.1% Tamang as their first language.

In terms of ethnicity/caste, 27.0% were Chhetri, 20.6% Hill Brahmin, 12.6% Magar, 11.2% Kami, 6.2% Thakuri, 6.1% Tharu, 4.2% Damai/Dholi, 2.8% Sarki, 2.5% Sanyasi/Dasnami, 1.6% Gurung, 1.6% Musalman, 1.1% Newar, 0.4% Badi, 0.4% Bhote, 0.3% Gaine, 0.2% Tamang, 0.1% Chhantyal, 0.1% Halwai, 0.1% Kathabaniyan, 0.1% Rai, 0.1% Raji, 0.1% other Terai and 0.1% others.

In terms of religion, 89.8% were Hindu, 5.2% Christian, 3.4% Buddhist and 1.6% Muslim.

In terms of literacy, 79.7% could read and write, 2.2% could only read and 18.2% could neither read nor write.

== Climate ==
The highest temperature ever recorded in Birendranagar was 41.8 °C (107.2 °F) on 5 May 1999, while the lowest temperature ever recorded was −0.7 °C (30.7 °F) on 9 January 2013.

Climate data for Birendranagar (Surkhet Airport), elevation 720 m (2,360 ft), (1991–2020 normals, extremes 1973–2017)
Month	Jan	Feb	Mar	Apr	May	Jun	Jul	Aug	Sep	Oct	Nov	Dec	Year
Record high °C (°F)	27.0 (80.6)	32.0 (89.6)	36.4 (97.5)	39.4 (102.9)	41.0 (105.8)	42.8 (109.0)	38.2 (100.8)	36.4 (97.5)	35.6 (96.1)	34.5 (94.1)	30.5 (86.9)	27.6 (81.7)	42.8 (109.0)
Mean daily maximum °C (°F)	20.5 (68.9)	23.4 (74.1)	28.4 (83.1)	33.4 (92.1)	34.7 (94.5)	33.6 (92.5)	31.2 (88.2)	31.1 (88.0)	30.9 (87.6)	29.3 (84.7)	25.6 (78.1)	21.9 (71.4)	28.7 (83.7)
Daily mean °C (°F)	12.9 (55.2)	15.8 (60.4)	20.2 (68.4)	25.0 (77.0)	27.6 (81.7)	28.3 (82.9)	27.4 (81.3)	27.3 (81.1)	26.3 (79.3)	22.6 (72.7)	18.0 (64.4)	14.0 (57.2)	22.1 (71.8)
Mean daily minimum °C (°F)	5.2 (41.4)	8.1 (46.6)	11.9 (53.4)	16.6 (61.9)	20.5 (68.9)	23.0 (73.4)	23.6 (74.5)	23.4 (74.1)	21.7 (71.1)	15.9 (60.6)	10.4 (50.7)	6.1 (43.0)	15.5 (59.9)
Record low °C (°F)	−0.7 (30.7)	−0.5 (31.1)	4.3 (39.7)	8.1 (46.6)	12.5 (54.5)	15.5 (59.9)	19.5 (67.1)	16.7 (62.1)	11.8 (53.2)	8.0 (46.4)	2.5 (36.5)	0.8 (33.4)	−0.7 (30.7)
Average precipitation mm (inches)	39.3 (1.55)	48.1 (1.89)	28.8 (1.13)	27.1 (1.07)	80.6 (3.17)	247.7 (9.75)	464.9 (18.30)	407.3 (16.04)	168.7 (6.64)	30.9 (1.22)	6.1 (0.24)	13.5 (0.53)	1,563 (61.53)
Average precipitation days (≥ 1.0 mm)	3.1	3.1	2.3	3.0	7.4	13.3	23.1	22.4	12.7	2.2	0.6	0.8	93.8
Source 1: Department of Hydrology and Meteorology
Source 2: World Meteorological Organization

== Infrastructure ==
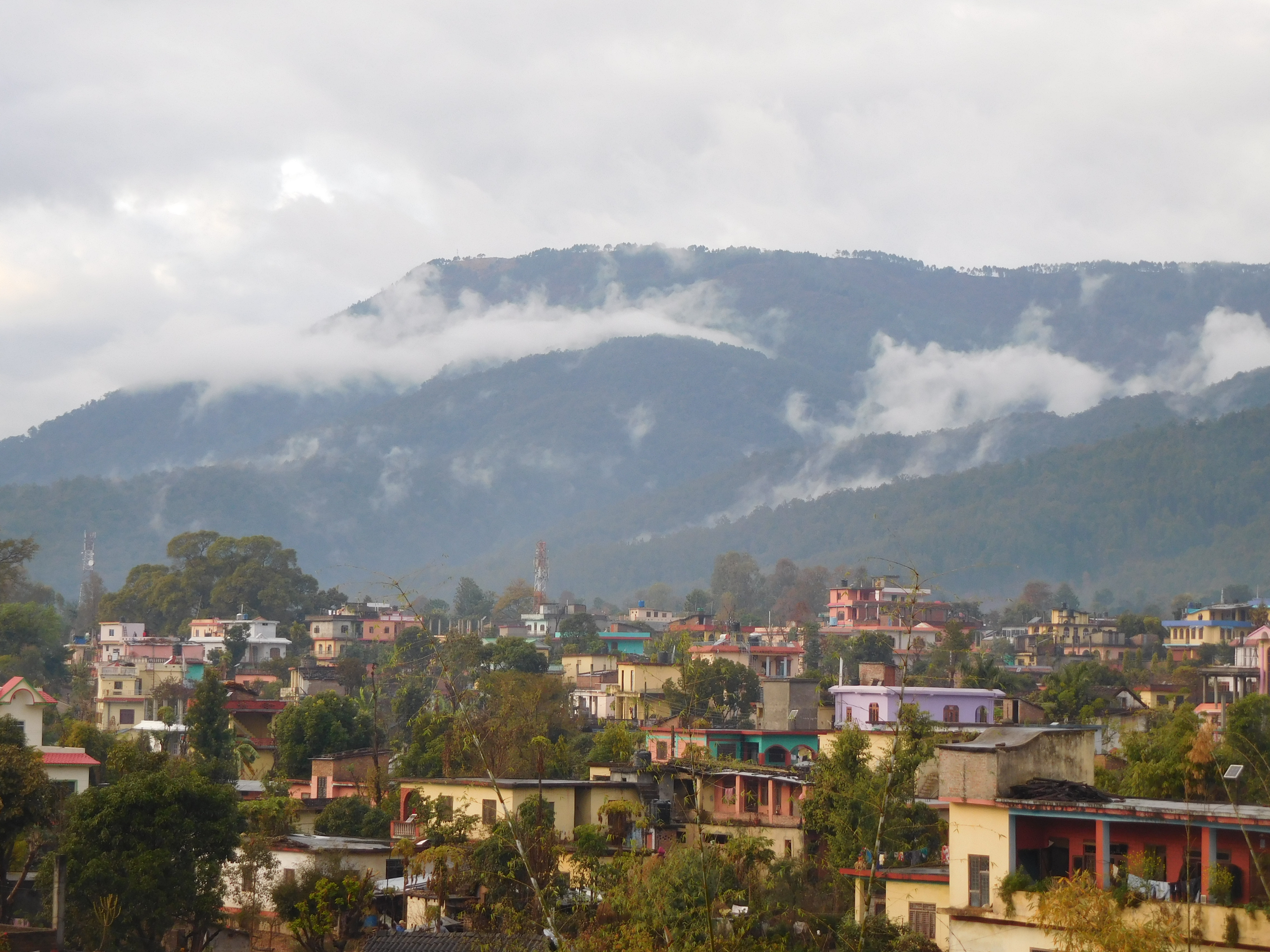
Birendranagar

Birendranagar is the main food supplier of the rural Karnali Province, which can be reached by the Karnali Highway. It is also the main shopping destination of the Dailekh, Jajrkot and Acham districts. There is also a domestic airport (Surkhet Airport; SKH) east of the city. There are direct flights from Kathmandu to Birendranagar and from Birendranagar to Jumla, Humla, Kalikot, Dolpa, Mugu, and other districts. The main road connecting Birendranagar to the rest of the country is the Ratna Highway. There is regular bus and taxi service to Kathmandu, Pokhara, Bharatpur, Dharan, Biratnagar and other parts of the country.

== Religious sites ==
=== Deuti Bajai Temple ===
Deauti Bajai (देउती वज्यै) is a Hindu temple in Birendranagar. Its history is closely associated with the people of Raji society; historically, only the people belonging to the Raji society used to pray in this temple. Nowadays, people from near and far come everyday to pray in this temple. It is a national heritage site, and the government and municipality are trying to develop and renovate this temple so as to attract more visitors. The shrine of Deuti Bajai was constructed by king Yash Malla.

=== Kakre Bihar ===
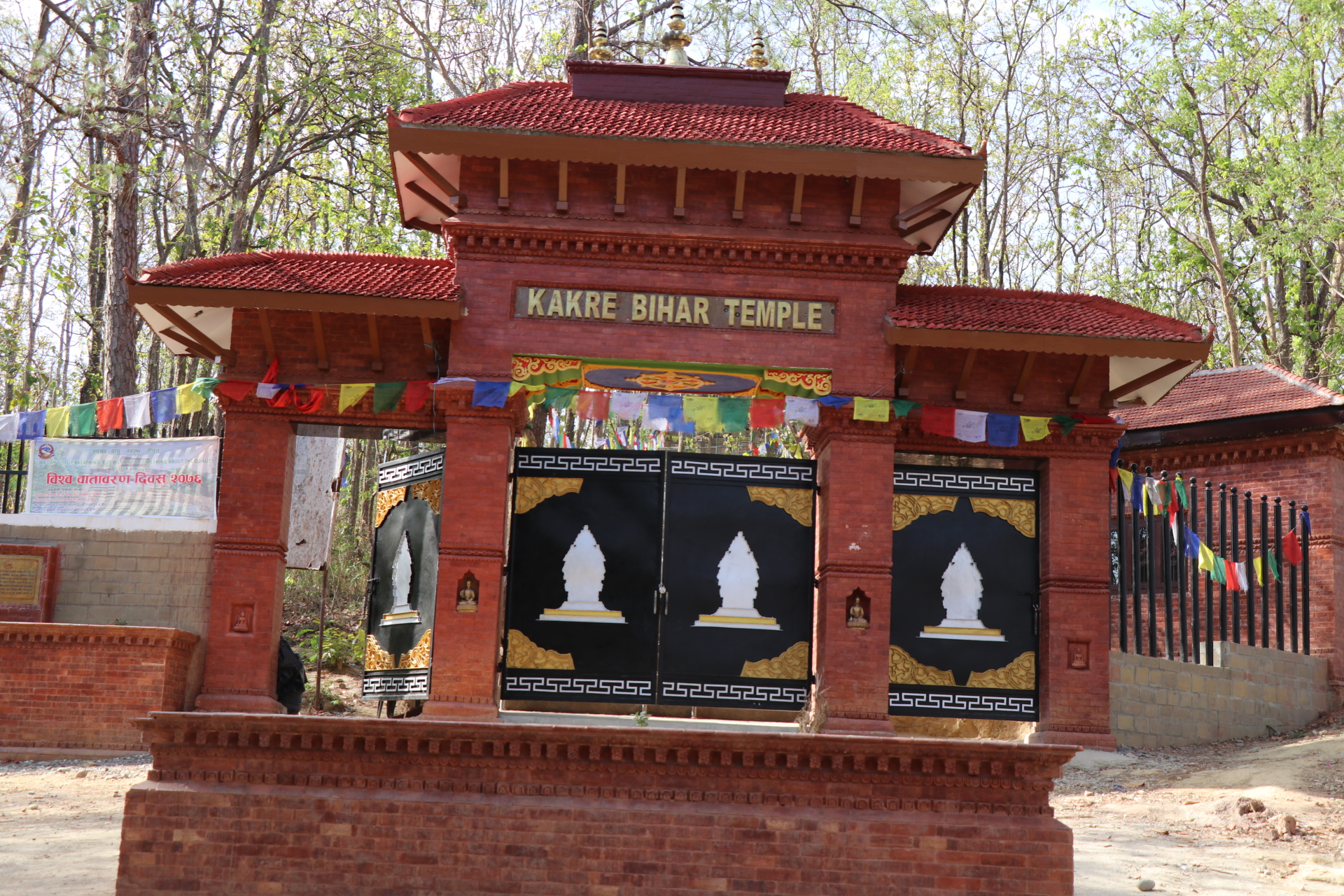
Entrance gate of Kakre Bihar

Kakre Bihar is a small hillock in the middle of the Surkhet Valley. On top of this hillock is a ruin of a 12th-century stone temple, which shows that the people of the region practiced Hinduism along with Buddhism. The carved stones and bronze statues reflect the images of Buddha, and many Hindu gods and goddesses including Saraswati and Ganesh. This Hindu-Buddhist temple is protected by the government and there is a plan in place to re-erect the structure to its original shape. Architects are working hard to put all the pieces together so as to come up with a model of the temple. With extensive views of Birendranagar, this place continuously ranks as one of the most important tourist destinations. Thousands of people come to the area for religious purposes as well as to experience the rejuvenating atmosphere of nature. Important archaeological, cultural and religious exhibits can be found in the city museum, which preserves facts about the place. An historical and religious temple of Surkhet, built in 18th century by Mall king. But nowadays, it is being reconstructed after destruction by massive earthquake in 1980 B.S in Nepal.

16 March 2016: The Department of Archaeology has started restoring a 12th-century temple at Kankre Bihar in Surkhet Valley. Eight craftsmen from Bhaktapur have been commissioned to rebuild the temple in the area where the, after 18 years of excavation, have unearthed several statues and other art facts linked with Hindu and Buddhist religions.

Chandra Ranjitkar, the head craftsman, said they were trying to rebuild the temple in its original form with the materials that were discovered during the excavation. We are connecting the stones based on their shapes and sizes, said Ranjitkar, who believes the temple was originally built by Indian artisans We do not find this kind of temple design in Nepal. Archaeologists have theorised that the temple was demolished sometime in the 16th century by the followers of Shankaracharya in a bid to stop the spread of Buddhism. Purna Bahadur Shrestha of the DoA said they have sped up the works and they expect the project to complete by 2017. The government has earmarked Rs 81.8 million for the temple restoration.krebihar, near Surkhet, Nepal: 12 th century temple complex, demonstrating interplay of Hinduism and Buddhism

=== Mangalgadhi Chowk ===
The pond and religious Hindu site as the bade of battalion of Nepal military is located in this area just to the south of city.

== Recreational sites ==
=== Bulbule Tal ===
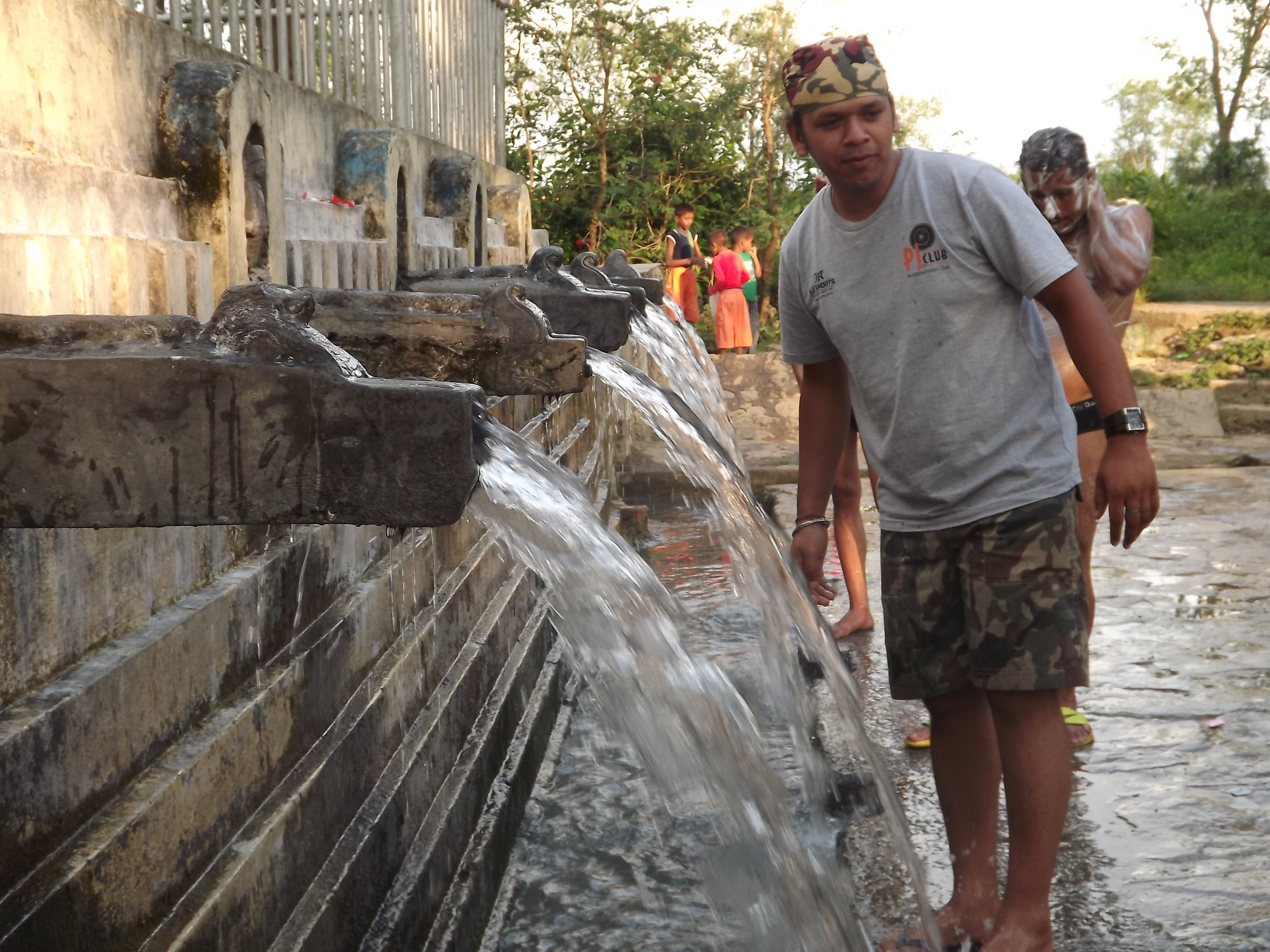
Stone spouts at Bulbule Lake

Located in the south of Surkhet bazaar, Bulbule lake is part of a recreation park. Because this is one of the constant sources of fresh water, a pipe system is installed to pump-supply drinking water to the village of Latikoili, that lies in the south of the lake. Boating, fishing, swimming to cultural rituals are organized inside the park area.

=== City museum ===
Regional museum named after the region situated at the heart of city has the cultural and religious facts of valley preserved. Ethnic group Raji has its own importance that is depicted from the collection of stuff from past inside the block. Different artistic sculptures from the Kankrevihar – the cucumber-shaped mountain part in the valley signifies the religious importance of the city. The museum is under construction.

== Colleges and university ==
=== Mid-Western University, Birendranagar ===
Nepal Government appointed Dr. Padam Lal Devkota, an anthropology professor, as the Vice-Chancellor (the chief executive) of the Midwestern University on 8 August 2011. This appointment can be regarded as the official beginning of the university in the Midwestern region of Nepal. Prior to this, a team of self-motivated and active educationists in Surkhet had been working hard for more than seventeen years to establish this university. This university has come into existence after a long and untiring efforts of the team. Collaborating with the existing political parties, building partnerships with adjacent districts, lobbying with the government, and fundraising campaigns had been a norm for this team built up by the people's bottom-up initiation and known in the region as the Preparation Committee of the Mid-Western University.

Since an independent institution of higher education was a cherished dream of the people of this area, the team was able to garner political support from the existing parties as well as a wide enthusiastic participation of the people of this region.

Mid-Western University is still in the making and has much to do before coming fully into function. The land, property, human resource, and the students of the existing TU-affiliated campuses in the region are likely to come under this university to give it a life to begin with. There is strong support to this university from the existing campuses throughout the region.

Supposed to be catering for the regional higher education need of the youth, this university is also expected to serve as a partner and a vehicle of the development of the whole Midwestern Development Region of the country. The headquarters of the university is in the process of opening soon in Birendranagar. It is also hoped that this university will bring about a significant change of strategy over the education system of this geographically largest region of the country. One of the most educationally backward regions, the area was also a sufferer and also an instigator of the 10-year civil war (1996–2006), which brought about major political changes nationwide.

=== Surkhetcampus (Education) ===
Officially known as "Surkhet Campus (Education)", this very old campus began operation in Nepalgunj. Later, when the campus was moved to Surkhet, Birendranagar Multiple Campus (BMC) was already in operation. For several years, the campus did not have its own buildings. Therefore, it would run its programs in the rented rooms of BMC during the day times and evenings. This was possible because BMC, attended mostly by office-goers, ran programs in the mornings only. It is one of the constituent campuses of Tribhuvan University, which has headquarters in Kathmandu.

=== Birendranagar Multiple campus ===
One of the most important colleges, it offers multiple streams of education up to masters level. Known countrywide in business administration, it is a popular campus because of its close proximity to main market. This campus is also affiliated to Tribhuvan University, the oldest and the largest university in Nepal.

=== Bidyapur Janata Campus ===
This campus is situated in Bidyapur VDC of Surkhet District which lies in western part of Surkhet. This VDC is the pioneer in education. The High School is one of the oldest schools in Surkhet and run by the support and participation of local people. The college, established in 2008 offers Bachelors program in Humanities and Education. The Campus is in initial phase and needs support from different national and international individuals interested in education. The economic condition of the people conducting the campus is not high enough to manage the college and there is nominal support from the government.

Apart from these major campuses, there are several other colleges and vocational schools run in the town. Now it runs program in its 5th year of establishment where new courses are adding continuously.

== Hospitals ==
Birendranagar is the main educational and health center in West Hilly Region of Nepal; various colleges and schools are there and a regional hospital and a district hospital are the major ones but other private hospitals, nursing homes, and clinics are also running.

Provincial Hospital

This newly constructed hospital is now running with a capacity of 125 beds but it is expected to be more than 500 beds soon. This hospital is due to provide all advanced lab services not only for the people of Birendranagar but also for the people of the entire Karnali of Nepal.

The 500-bed hospital is due to be built in five phases. Approximately 22 bighas of land has been allocated for the construction of the hospital at ward No.3 Kalagaun in Birendranagar. Although plans were made three years ago for the construction, it could not be built for various reasons.

District Hospital

Oldest hospital in Birendranagar running with 35 beds and providing medical facilities to the locals. Also there is an American diplomat made Eye care center in the compound District hospital, This Eye care center has 15 bed services with operation room.

Midwestern Region Veterinary Hospital Birendranagar Nepal

This hospital is providing all the treatment to the cattle of the local farmers in the Midwestern region of Nepal.

One eye treatment center and other private hospital and nursing homes are also serving the people of Birendranagar.

== Media ==
Radio Nepal has a regional station in Birendranagar, transmitting various programs of mass interest. Local FM radio stations include:

- Radio Bheri 102.7 MHz
- Radio Surkhet 90.2 MHz
- Jagaran F.M. 90.8 MHz
- Bulbule F.M. 103.4 MHz

The local TV stations are Sungava and Samabeshi.

== Gallery ==
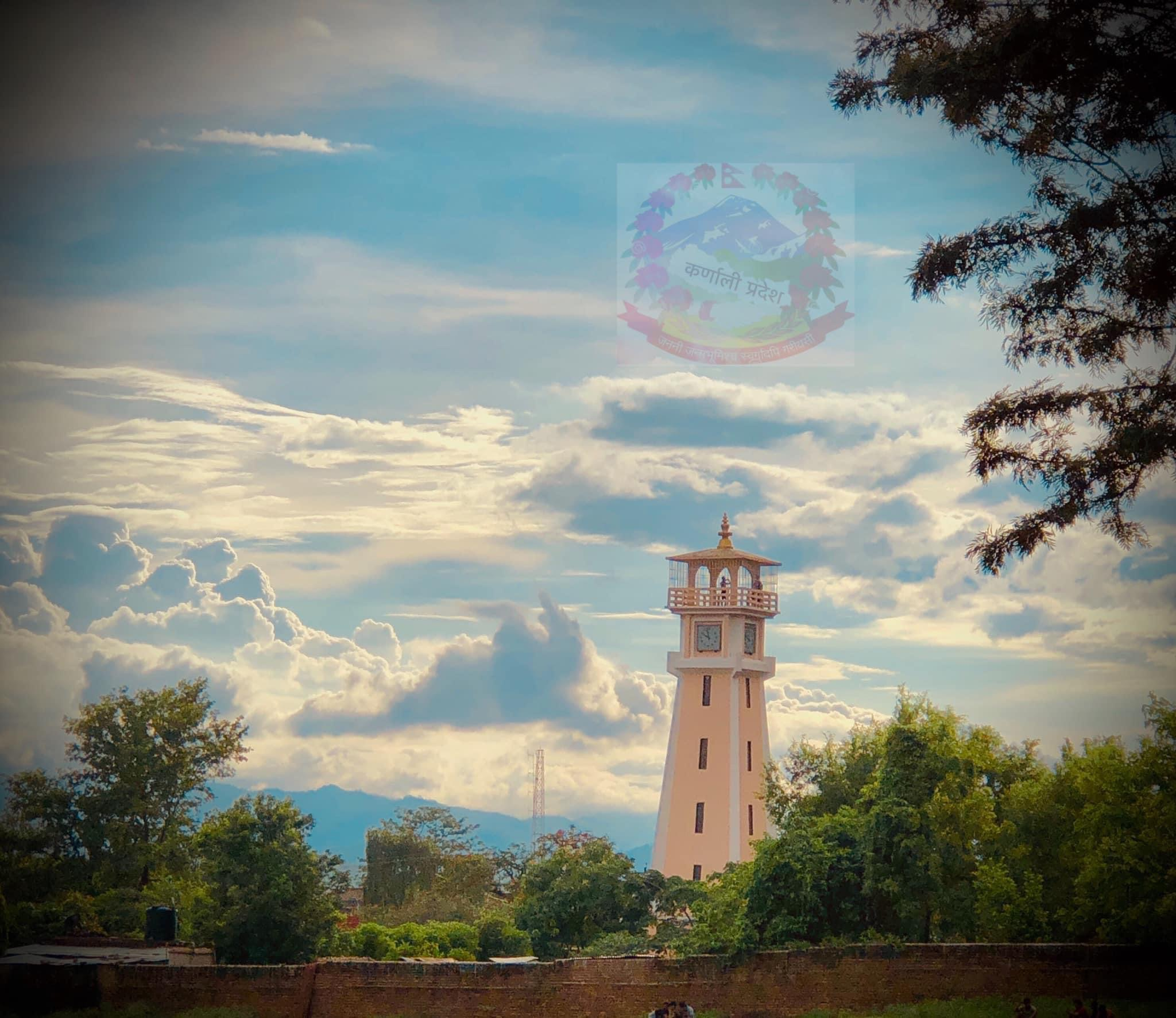
