= Kanjiroba =

Mountain in Nepal

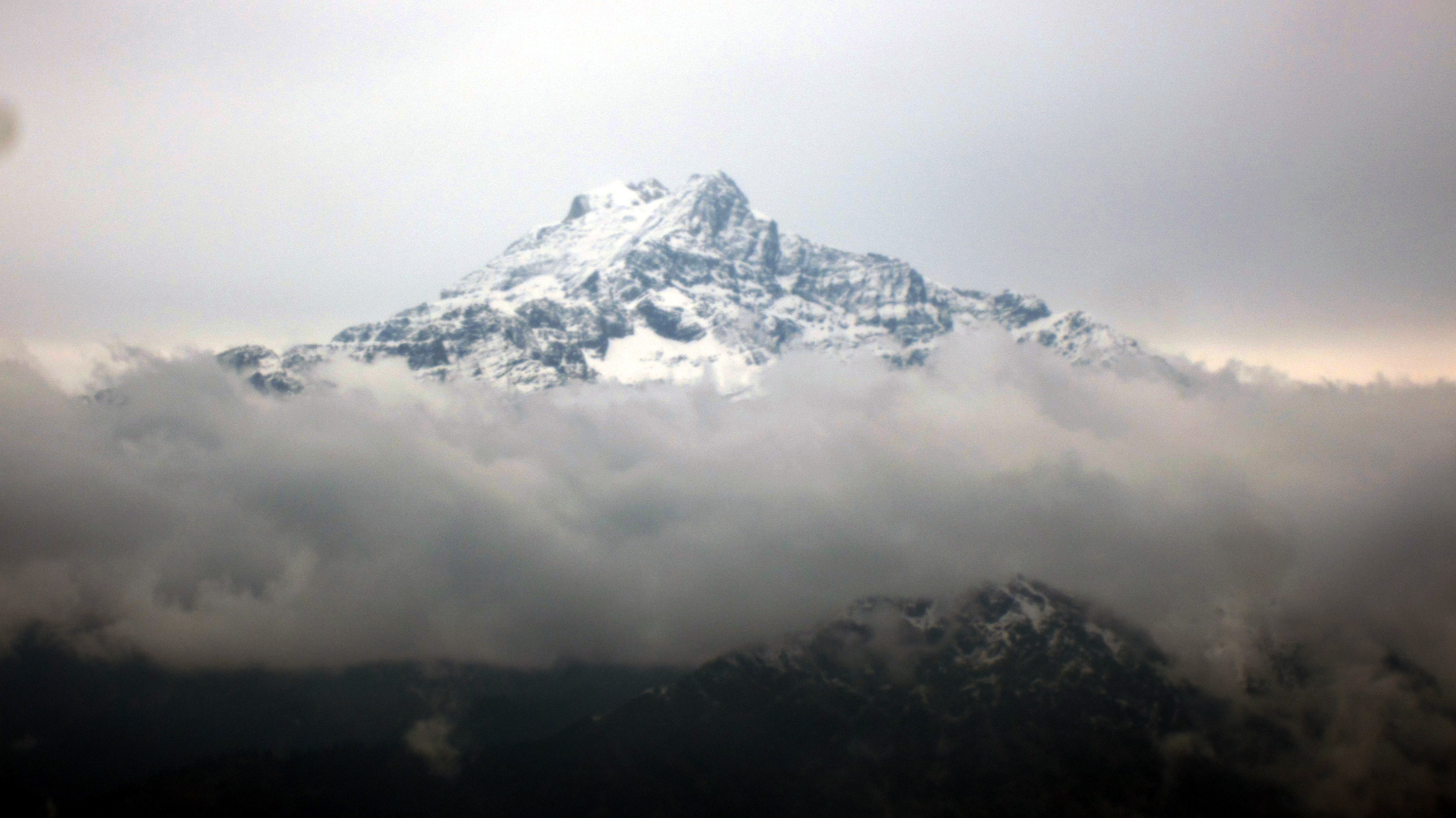
- Kanjiroba in Dolpa

Highest point
- Elevation: 6,883 m (22,582 ft)
- Prominence: 1,870 m (6,140 ft)
- Listing: Mountains of Nepal; Ultra
- Coordinates: 29°22′42″N 82°38′21″E

Geography
- Location within Nepal
- Country: Nepal
- Province: Karnali
- District: Dolpa
- Parent range: Kanjiroba Himal, Himalayas

Climbing
- First ascent: 1970

Kanjiroba is a mountain in Dolpa District, Nepal. With a summit elevation of 6,883 m (22,582 ft) above sea level, it is the highest peak of the Kanjiroba Himal subrange of the Himalayas. The first ascent was made by a Japanese team from Osaka City University in 1970.

== Geography ==
Kanjiroba is a mountain in the Kanjiroba Himal subrange of the Himalayas in western Nepal. The Kanjiroba Himal is located between the Saipal to the northwest and the Dhaulagiri range to the southeast. It has two summits, the highest of which rises to an elevation of 6,883 m (22,582 ft), and is the highest peak of the Kanjiroba Himal. The highest point is connected to the other summit, rising to 6,860 m (22,510 ft), by a ridge approximately 1.21 km (0.75 miles) long.

== Mountaineering ==
Austrian geologist and climber Herbert Tichy was among the first to explore the Kanjiroba in 1953. Tichy, accompanied by a group of Sherpas, made several ascents along the southern part of the mountain. In 1958, a Japanese expedition led by Jiro Kawakita crossed Dolpo from the east but was unable to reach the mountain after they failed to cross the Langu Gorge. In 1961, a British expedition led by John Tyson conducted the a survey of the mountain, and estimated its height to be 6,882 m (22,579 ft). The expedition approached from the southeast, and climbed the peak of Matathumba. They identified a possible approach to Kanjiroba from the south. In 1962, the Jagdula expedition, consisting of an all-women team, explored the southeastern part of the Kanjiroba Himal range. In 1964, another British expedition led by Tyson attempted to climb the mountain. In 1969, Tyson returned to attempt to climb the mountain from the north. The expedition abandoned the climb along the southeastern ridge because of difficult terrain and snow conditions.

The first ascent of Kanjiroba was made on 7 November 1970 by four members of a Japanese expedition from Osaka City University. The team consisted of Ichiryo Sato, Hiroshi Okuda, Hirotada Sawai, Munehiro Sawada, Shinichi Suwa and Masayki Goto, and was led by Kazuhisa Jokei. They approached the mountain from Jumla and established the base camp at 3,800 m (12,500 ft). They crossed the Patrasi Himal, before descending into the Jagdula Khola, and then established set of camps along the southeastern ridge. On 7 November, a four member team consisting of Sato, Okuda, Sawai, and Sawada made an attempt at the summit from camp VII at approximately 5,800 m (19,000 ft). At 3:30 pm, they reached the summit at 6,883 m (22,582 ft).

In 1974, a Japanese expedition reported that they had reached the summit via a new route from the east. However, in 2026, the American Alpine Journal published a reassessment of the Japanese expedition, which established that the expedition had actually made the first ascent of Kasi Dalpha (6,386 m (20,951 ft)), a different peak in the Kanjiroba Himal, rather than Kanjiroba.

In 1976, a British expedition led by Dick Isherwood made the second ascent of Kanjiroba and in 1979, a Japanese expedition led by Sushi Ineaga made the third ascent, approaching from the northwest. The mountain was not climbed for nearly twenty years, until, a British expedition summited in 2000. The British team followed the route taken by John Tyson in 1961 and reached the summit via the southeastern ridge on 26 September.

== See also ==
- List of ultras of the Himalayas
