= Shey Gompa =

Buddhist monastery

Shey Gompa Monastery
- Location within Nepal

Religion
- Affiliation: Tibetan Buddhism

Location
- Location: Dolpa, Nepal
- Coordinates: 29.352°N 82.825°E

The Shey Gompa (Nepali: शे गुम्बा, She gumba) is a Buddhist monastery located in the She Phoksundo rural municipality of the Dolpa district in Nepal at an elevation of 4200m. Shey Gompa means the Crystal Monastery in Tibetan. It was established in the 11th century. The monastery is considered to be the spiritual heart of Upper Dolpa.

The monastery has a two-story building coloured in red and the interior has various Buddhist paintings.

A festival called Shey Mela is organized every twelve years. It is believed that in 1220 BS, the Kagyu tribe came to this place and started this festival as a symbol of winning against the evil spirits, the Rakshyas.

== See also ==
- Shey Phoksundo National Park
