= Rara Highway =

Highway in Nepal

Rara Highway रारा राजमार्ग
- राष्ट्रिय राजमार्ग ५६
- National Highway 56
- NH56 in red

Route information
- Maintained by MoPIT (Department of Roads)
- Length: 223.91 km (139.13 mi)

Major junctions
- North end: Juina
- Chaurajahari, Kudari, Bulbule
- Sourh end: Tharmare

Location
- Country: Nepal
- Provinces: Karnali Province
- Districts: Salyan District, West Rukum, Jajarkot District, Jumla District, Mugu District

Highway system
- Roads in Nepal
← NH55	→ NH57

Rara Highway (National Highway 56) is a proposed national highway in Nepal which is being conducted in Karnali Province. The total length of the highway is proposed to be 223.91 kilometres (139.13 mi). According to SNH2020-21 110.02 kilometres (68.36 mi) of track has been opened in four districts; Salyan District (34.42 km (21.39 mi)), West Rukum (18.73 km (11.64 mi)), Jumla District (29.76 km (18.49 mi)) and Mugu District (27.11 km (16.85 mi).

DPR has been advanced for the road upgrading of the touristic Rara highway in Karnali province. DPR has been advanced for upgradation of 20 km road. Also a feasibility study for a tunnel linking Jajarkot and Jumla is set to begin soon. One has to walk around 10 hours uphill to reach Jumla from Jajarkot. The tunnel will reduce the journey to a mere 30 mins once the tunnel construction is completed
