= National Botanical Garden (Nepal) =

Botanical garden in Nepal

- राष्ट्रिय वनस्पति उद्यान
- Entrance to the garden

- Location within Kathmandu Valley Location within Bagmati Province Location within Nepal
- Type: Botanical
- Location: Godawari Municipality, Lalitput District, Bagmati Province, Nepal
- Coordinates: 27°35′48.955″N 85°22′48.515″E
- Area: 82 hectares (200 acres)
- Created: 28 October 1962; 64 years ago
- Founder: Government of Nepal
- Operator: Department of Plant Resources, MoAFE
- Website: nbg.gov.np

The National Botanical Garden (Nepali: राष्ट्रिय वनस्पति उद्यान) formerly, Royal Botanical Garden, is a botanical garden located in Godawari Municipality, Lalitpur District, Bagmati Province, Nepal. Established in 1962, it is a centre for the conservation, study and research of plant diversity in Nepal. The garden is currently administered by the Department of Plant Resources under the Ministry of Agriculture, Forests and Environment, Government of Nepal.

The garden covers approximately 82 ha (200 acres), out of which around 40 ha (99 acres) have be developed into thematic gardens. It contains a rich collection of indigenous and exotic plants, including flowering and non-flowering plants, trees, shrubs, herbs and other medicinal plants.

Tropical House at the garden

== History ==
The foundation stone of the garden was laid on 12 July 1961 and was inaugurated on 28 October 1962 as the Royal Botanical Garden by King Mahendra Bir Bikram Shah. The initial landscape design was undertaken by British horticulturists Geoffrey Herklots and Tony Schilling. Following the abolition of monarchy, the garden was renamed to National Botanical Garden on 3 July 2006.

== Plant collections and biodiversity ==
The National Botanical Garden maintains living collections of native and exotic plant species for conservation, research and public display. The garden maintains approximately 1,285 plant species representing around 1,300 taxa. Its conservation activities include both in-situ and ex-situ conservation of plant species, including several threatened and endangered plant species.

In addition to the intensive plant collection, the garden also hosts various wildlifes and insects within its premises. The garden records around 25 species of mammals, 290 species of birds and 250 species of butterflies.

== Research and education ==
The garden serves as a centre for botanical research, plant conservation and environmental education. In 2016, the garden developed a Biodiversity Education Garden in collaboration with the Royal Botanic Garden Edinburgh. The project commemorated the bicentenary of diplomatic relations between Nepal and the United Kingdom.

== See also ==
- List of protected areas of Nepal
