= Bheri Corridor =

Highway in Nepal

Bheri Corridor भेरी करिडोर
- राष्ट्रिय राजमार्ग ५७
- National Highway 57
- NH57 in red

Route information
- Maintained by MoPIT (Department of Roads)
- Length: 317 km (197 mi)

Major junctions
- North end: Botechaur (Gurbhakot Municipality
- South end: Marim (Dolpo Buddha)

Location
- Country: Nepal
- Provinces: Karnali Province
- Districts: Surkhet District, Salyan District, Jajarkot District, Dolpa District

Highway system
- Roads in Nepal
← NH56	→ NH58

Bheri Corridor (NH57) (Nepali: भेरी कोरिडोर) is a 317 kilometres (197 mi) National Highway of Nepal that runs from mid-hill to the northern border with China. It is located in Karnali Province.

The contract for the last section of the Bheri Corridor was given to the Nepali Army in 2007. The Nepali Army finished it in 2018.
