= Kanjiroba Himal =

Portion of the Himalayas

Kanjirowa
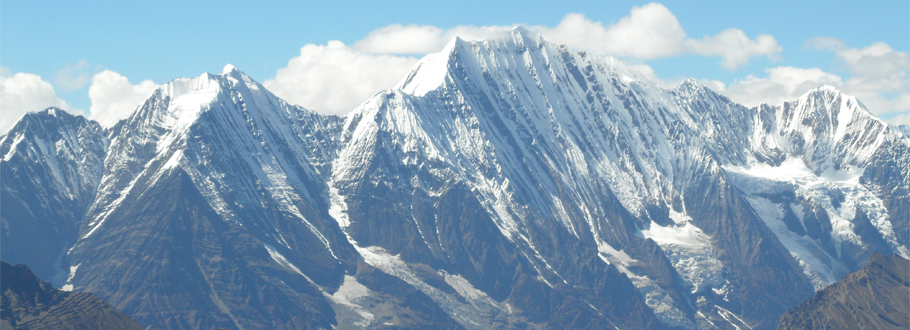
- Kanjirowa Himal sub-range of the Himalayas

Highest point
- Elevation: 6,883 m (22,582 ft)
- Prominence: 1,870 m (6,140 ft)
- Listing: Ultra
- Coordinates: 29°22′42″N 82°38′21″E

Geography
- Location within Nepal
- Location: Nepal
- Parent range: Kanjirowa Himal, Himalayas

Kanjirowa Himal is a mountain range of the Himalayas in northwestern Nepal. The highest peak is Kanjiroba with a summit elevation of 6,883 m (22,582 ft).

== Geography ==
Kanjiroba Himal is a mountain range of the Himalayas in northwestern Nepal. It is located about 130 km (80 miles) from the Saipal range to the northwest and about 80 km (50 miles) the Dhaulagiri range to the southeast. The range is spread over an area of 520 km^{2} (200 sq mi) and is characterized by deep river gorges and numerous high mountain peaks. It stretches from Phoksundo Lake and Suli Gad in the east to Chaudbise Khola and Churta Khola in the west. It extends up to Langu Khola in the north. (Note: Khola means river in Nepali.)

== Peaks ==
There are several peaks above 6,000 m (20,000 ft) in the range, the highest of which is Kanjiroba. It has two summits, the highest of which rises to an elevation of 6,883 m (22,582 ft), and is connected to the other summit, rising to 6,860 m (22,510 ft), by a ridge approximately 1.21 km (0.75 miles) long. Other peaks above 6,500 m (21,300 ft) include Kande Hiunchuli, at 6,627 m (21,742 ft), Kanjeralwa at 6,612 m (21,693 ft), Tsho Karpo Kang at 6,556 m (21,509 ft), and Tripura Tumba at 6,553 m (21,499 ft).

== Exploration and mountaineering ==
The first maps of the region were made by the Survey of India in 1927-28, which did not accurately represent the region due to the range's remote location and difficulty in accessing it. Austrian geologist Herbert Tichy was among the first Europeans to explore the Kanjiroba Himal in 1953. Tichy, accompanied by a group of Sherpas, made several ascents along the southern edge of the range. In 1961, a British expedition led by John Tyson conducted the first systematic survey of the range, and estimated the height of Kanjiroba peak as 6,882 m (22,579 ft). The expedition approached from the southeast of the range and carried out theodolite measurements. They also climbed the peak of Matathumba, and identified a possible approach to Kanjiroba from the south.

In 1962, another British expedition team consisting of John Earle, James Burnet and Tyson, accompanied by four Sherpas under Sirdar Ang Dawa, explored and mapped parts of the Kanjiroba Himal along with other ranges in the region. Later that year, the Jagdula expedition, consisting of an all-women team, explored the southeastern part of the Kanjiroba Himal range and climbed several peaks around the Kagmara Lekh and Lha Shamma. In 1964, another British expedition led by Tyson returned to explore possible climbing routes to Kanjiroba. The team approached from Pokhara and crossed Dolpo towards Garpung Khola. They surveyed parts of the Kagmara Lekh and attempted to reach Kanjiroba through the Langu Gorge, but difficult terrain prevented the climb.

In 1969, Tyson led another British expedition which attempted to approach Kanjiroba from the north through the Langu Gorge. The expedition abandoned the climb along the southeastern ridge because of difficult terrain and snow conditions. The first ascent of Kanjiroba was made on 7 November 1970 by four members of a Japanese expedition from Osaka City University. The team consisted of Ichiryo Sato, Hiroshi Okuda, Hirotada Sawai, Munehiro Sawada, Shinichi Suwa and Masayki Goto, and was led by Kazuhisa Jokei.

In 1974, a Japanese expedition led by Fumihito Watanabe made the first ascent of Kanjeralwa, a peak southeast of Kanjiroba. On 22 April, a four member team consisting of two Japanese and two Sherpas reached the summit, while four other members of the expedition reached the summit the following day.
