= Ratna Highway =

Road in Nepal

H12
- रत्न राजमार्ग
- Ratna Highway
- Ratna Highway in red
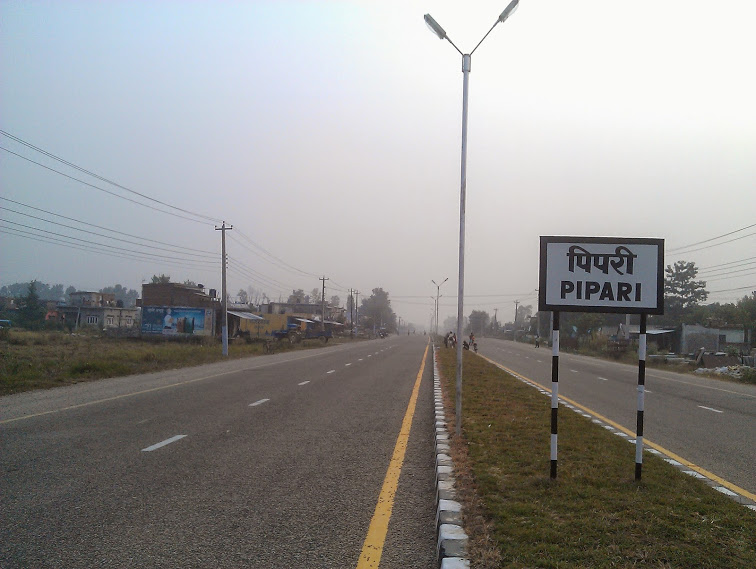
- Ratna Highway South of Kohalpur

Route information
- Maintained by MoPIT (Department of Roads)
- Length: 113.08 km (70.26 mi)

Major junctions
- From: Nepalganj, Nepal
- To: Birendranagar, Nepal

Location
- Country: Nepal

Highway system
- Roads in Nepal
← H11	→ H13

Ratna Highway (previously H12) (Nepali: रत्न राजमार्ग) is now a part of NH58 together with Karnali Highway.

Ratna Highway was a highway in western Nepal that crosses the districts of Banke and Surkhet in a south to north direction. The 113.08 km highway starts at Nepalgunj, where it depicts a continuation of National Highway 927 of India and runs towards the North, where it crosses Mahendra Highway at Kohalpur. The highway continues north and leaves the Terai Plains, crosses Babai River and terminates in Birendranagar, from where Karnali Highway continues northwards.
