= Rajhena =

Rajhena रझेना
- Location in Lumbini Province Rajhena (Nepal)
- Coordinates: 28.21°N 81.67°E
- Country: Nepal
- Province: Lumbini Province
- District: Banke District

Population (1991)
  - Total: 7,593
- Time zone: UTC+5:45 (Nepal Time)

Rajhena is a market center in Kohalpur Municipality in Banke District in Lumbini Province of south-western Nepal. The former Village was merged to form new municipality on 18 May 2014. At the time of the 1991 Nepal census it had a population of 7,593 and had 1265 houses in the town.
