= Karnali Highway =

Road in Nepal

Karnali Highway कर्णाली राजमार्ग
- राष्ट्रिय राजमार्ग ५८
- National Highway 58
- Karnali Highway in red
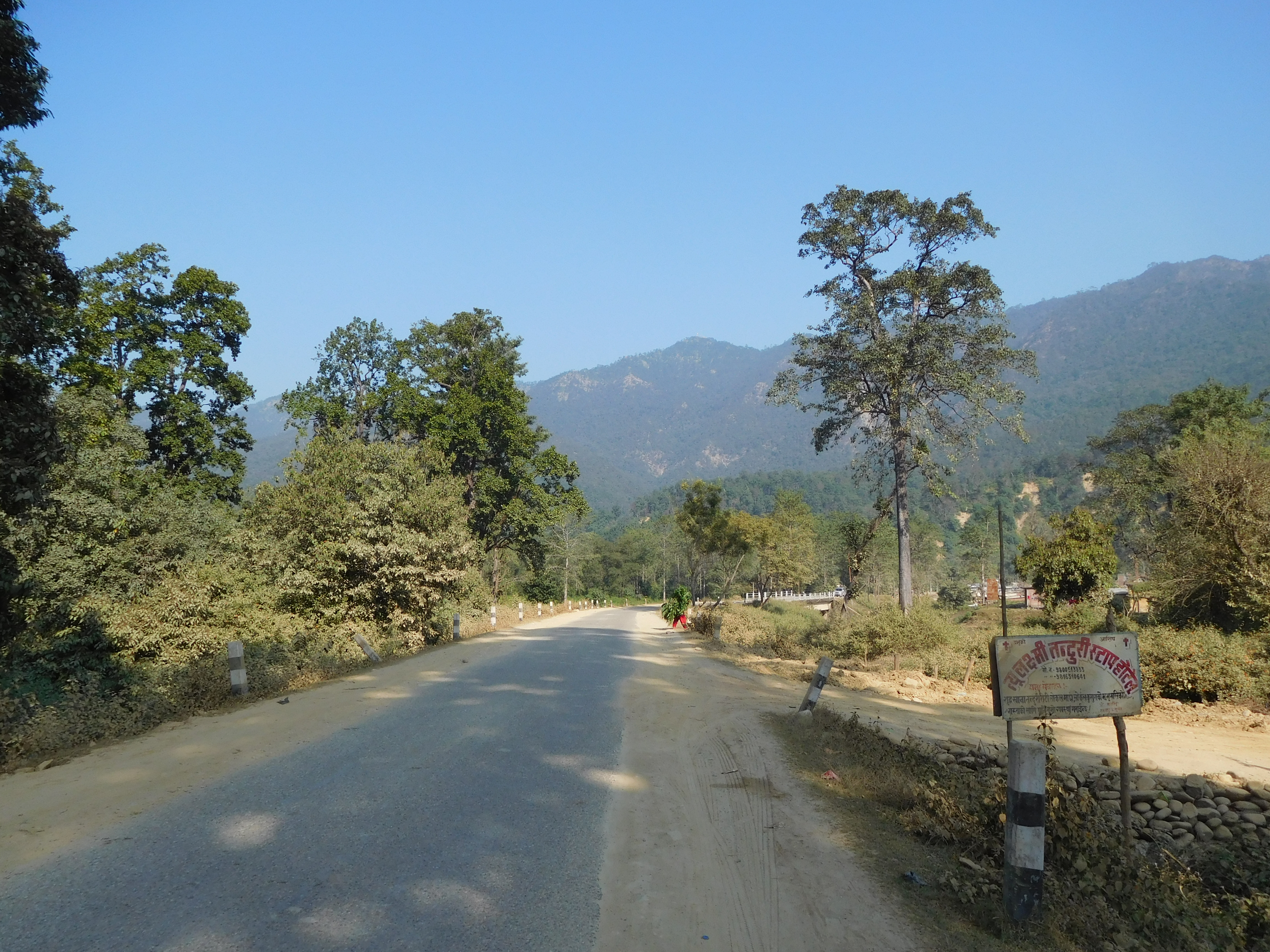
- Karnali Highway near Babai

Route information
- Maintained by MoPIT (Department of Roads)
- Length: 505 km (314 mi)

Major junctions
- From: Jamunaha, Banke District, Nepal
- Nepalgunj, Kohalpur, Chhinchu, Birendranagar, Baddichaur, Tallo Dungeshwar, Rakam, Manma, Okhartola
- To: Hilsa, Humla District, Nepal

Location
- Country: Nepal
- Provinces: Karnali, Lumbini
- Primary destinations: Nepalgunj, Birendranagar, Simikot

Highway system
- Roads in Nepal
| ← NH57 | → NH59 |

Karnali Highway (NH58), also known as Karnali Corridor, is the north–south longest National highway of Nepal. It connects Nepal, China, and India. The Karnali Corridor stretches from Jamunaha in Banke District near the Indo–Nepal border to Hilsa in Humla District near the Nepal–China border. The total length of the road from Jamunaha to Hilsa is 505 km

Previously the southern section of the Karnali Highway from Jamunaha to Birendranagar used to be a separate national highway known as Ratna Highway or National Highway 12 and the Northern section was originally Karnali Highway from Birendranagar to Manma (Jumla) numbering National Highway 13 merged to make one National Highway 58. Statics of National Highway 2020/21 published by Department of Roads (Nepal) managed all 21 previous highway into 80 new National Highway.

Humla District, the north–west district of Nepal bordering China from north and west was the last district which was not connected to the National Highway system of Nepal. After more than two decades of effort, Simikot—the district headquarters of Humla in Karnali Province—has been officially connected to Nepal’s national road network. Prime Minister KP Sharma Oli inaugurated a Bailey bridge over the Chuwakhola river on July 6 2025, completing the long-delayed link along the Karnali corridor. The construction of the corridor began roughly 26 years ago in the late 1990s, but progress has been hampered by difficult terrain, administrative delays, and inconsistent state attention. Though the corridor’s 107 kilometres section, from Hilsa near the Chinese border to Simkot was already completed in 2019. Much of the southern route of Karnali Corridor is still an unpaved track prone to landslides and seasonal disruption.

The then prime minister Girija Prasad Koirala had laid the foundation for the highway in 1992, but the passage was opened only in 2007. This highway links the towns of Jumla with the Karnali capital Birendranagar and rest parts of Surkhet district. Of its 232-kilometre (144 mi) length, 17 kilometres (11 mi) were blacktopped in 2010, previously the unfinished highway journey was featured in a documentary The Karnali Express: Bumping on for 52 Hours Due to heavy monsoon rains in 2010, the Karnali Highway was closed due to landslides from heavy monsoon rains, crops were destroyed by incessant rain, and 1/3 of the entire country was inaccessible except by foot. It was finally reopened October 3, three months later, but not until after starvation deaths.

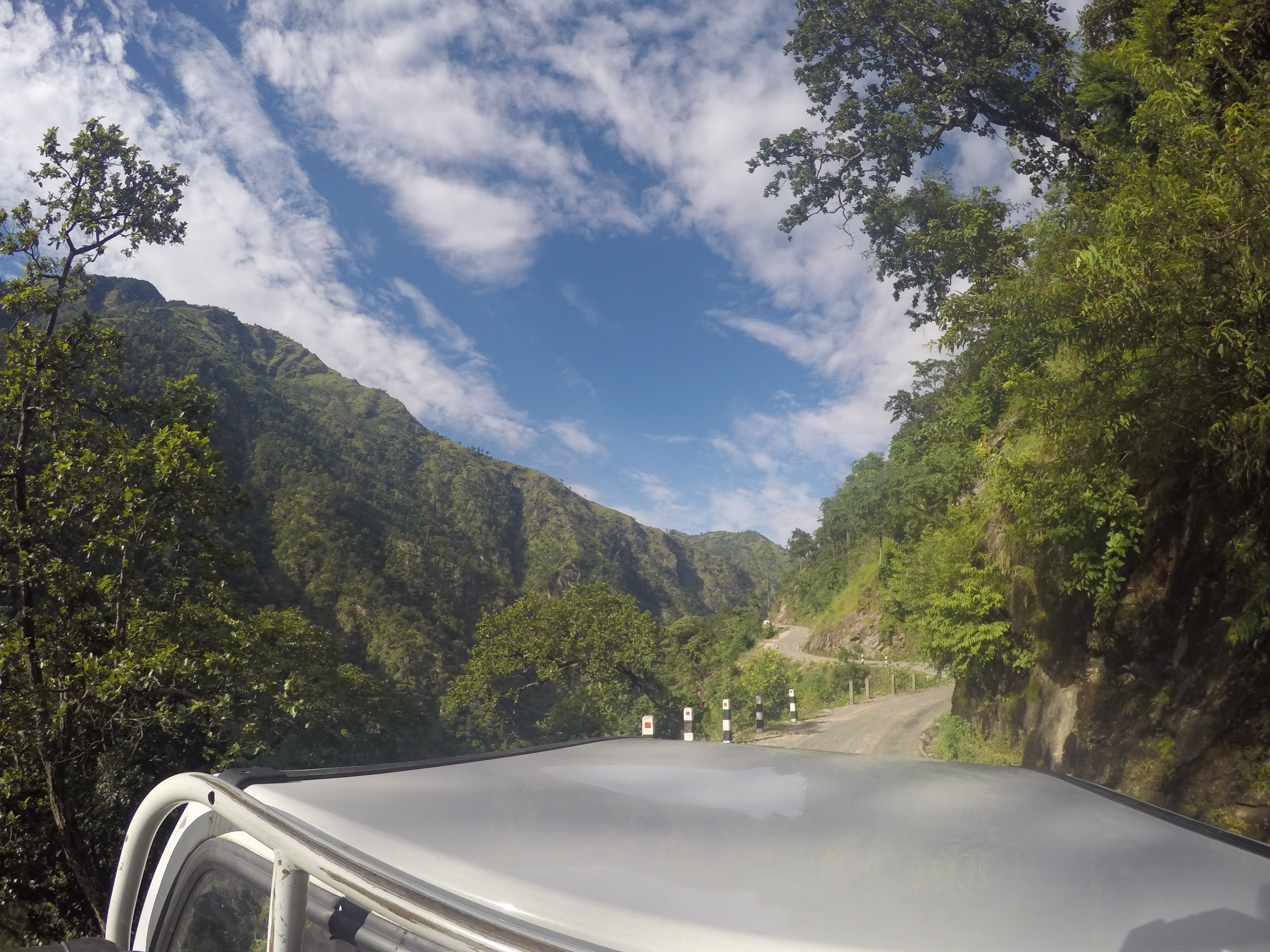
highway captured when traveling

According to “A Value Chain Analysis of Apple from Jumla”, and the intervention strategy indicates that more than 85 percent of the Karnali highway is still unsafe as of July 2011. Many rural inhabitants along the highway have poor access to markets, healthcare facilities and schools and deal with high transport costs. Inadequate roads make it hard for farmers to transport and market their crops. There is a pressing need to provide a functional road system in the area, made more urgent by current concerns over food prices and shortages, high energy costs and social and health needs
