= Masto =

Masto is a surname. Notable people with the surname include:

- Catherine Cortez Masto (born 1964), American lawyer and politician
- Raffaele Masto (1953–2020), Italian journalist
