= Surkhet Valley =

Surkhet Valley सुर्खेत उपत्यका
- Valleys of Nepal
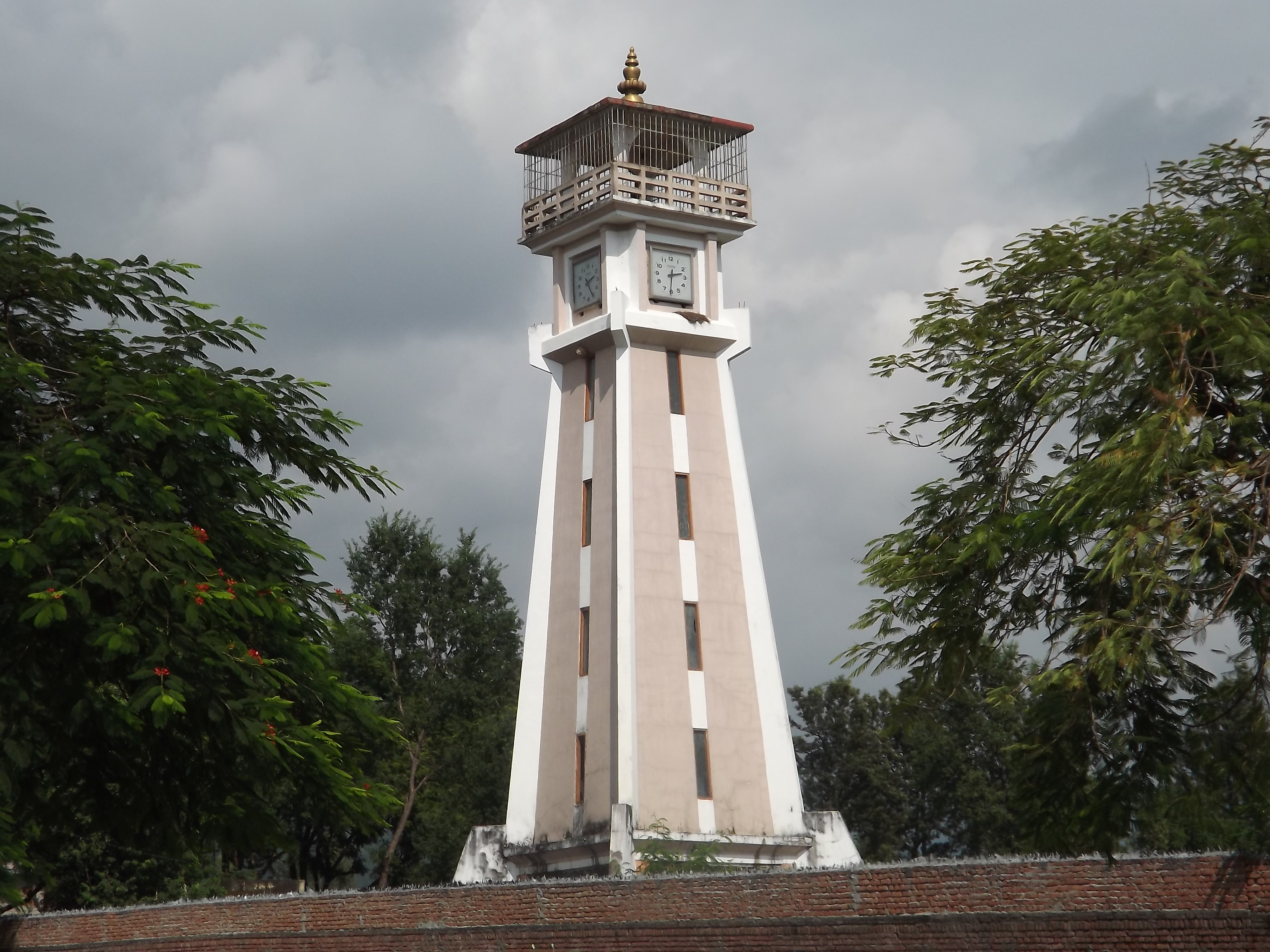
- Ghantaghar of Surkhet Valley
- Country: Nepal
- Province: Karnali Province
- District: Surkhet District

Area
  - Total: 50 km^{2} (19 sq mi)

Population (2021 Census)
  - Total: 200,000
  - Density: 4,000/km^{2} (10,000/sq mi)
- Time zone: UTC+5:45 (Nepal Time)

Surkhet Valley is the largest inner Terai valley of Karnali Province, Nepal. It serves as the administrative and commercial center of the province, with Birendranagar as its capital city. The valley is situated in Midwestern Nepal in Surkhet district, surrounded by the Sivalik hills and Mahabharat range.

The valley is about 700 m (2,300 ft) above sea level, forming an ellipse about 9 km (5.6 mi) east-west by 6 km (3.7 mi) north-south. It is drained by the Bheri River, a tributary of the Karnali. The district is the homeland of the Raji people. Tharu people from Dang settled in the valley since at least the 19th century.

The valley covers about 50 km^{2} (19 sq mi) within the district. The valley hosts the urban core of Birendranagar and surrounding settlements. The population in the valley area is around 200,000 people, since more than half of the district’s people live in and around Birendranagar.
