= Lake Cluster of Pokhara Valley =

Group of lakes in Nepal

Lake cluster
- Location within Gandaki Province Location within Nepal
- Location: Kaski district, Gandaki Province
- Coordinates: 28°15′50″N 83°58′20″E
- Type: Fresh water
- Catchment area: Seti Gandaki valley
- Basin countries: Nepal
- Average depth: 100 m (330 ft)
- Max. depth: 167 m (548 ft)
- Surface elevation: 827 m (2,713 ft)

Ramsar Wetland
- Designated: 2 February 2016
- Reference no.: 2257

Lake Cluster is the collective name for nine lakes in the Pokhara valley in western Nepal. The nine lakes which constitute the lake cluster are Phewa, Begnas, Rupa, Khaste, Dipang, Maidi, Gunde, Neurani, Kamalpokhari and Pokhara Seti Catchment. The lakes are fresh water lakes in the Nepalese Himalayas. The lakes are located in and around Pokhara metropolitan city of Kaski District. Phewa and Kamalpokhari lakes are located in the town of Pokhara while the rest of the lakes are in the town of Lekhnath.

On 2 February 2016, it was declared as Ramsar site, covering 261.1 km^{2} (100.8 sq mi) including the surrounding catchment area. Water bodies constitute 3.5% of the catchment area of lake cluster. Pokhara Valley Lake conservation committee was established in 2008 with an objective to conserve the ecosystem around the lakes.

== Plant and animal life ==
=== Flora ===
The area has 60 aquatic plants and over 300 terrestrial plants. Rare marsh wild rice species Oryza rufipogon is found here. Some other threatened and important plant species found here are Apostasia wallichii and Michelia champaca, Asparagus racemosus, Bulbophyllum plyrhiza, Cymbidium iridioides, Dendrobium densiflorum, D. fimbiatum and Alsophila spinulosa, Dioscorea deltoidea, Oberonia nepalensis, Oberonia iridifolia, Oroxylum indicum and Papilionantheteres species Tinospora cordifolia and monogeneric species like Ceratophyllum demersum, Trapa natans and Typha angustifolia. All these lakes are sub-surface drainage type. Phewa is meso-eutrophic, Lake Bagnas is meso-eutrophic and rest of the lakes are eutrophic.

=== Fauna ===
There are 168 species of birds found in the area. Most of the birds are wetland birds. Some of the important birds found here are Spiny Babbler (Turdoides nepalensis), Nepal Wren Babbler (Pnoepyga immaculate), Comb duck (Sarkidiornis melanotos), Baer's Pochard (Aythya baeri), Ferruginous Duck (Aythya nyroca).

The lake holds 28 fish species, 11 amphibian species, 28 reptile species and 32 mammal species. The population of otters is declining around the lakes. The lake area is also home to few globally threatened species like clouded leopard (Neofelis nebulosa), common leopard (Panthera pardusfusca), and Indian pangolin (Manis crassicaudata).

== Threats ==
The increase in human population has resulted in increasing pressure on the lakes. The encroachment for agriculture, excessive fishing, eutrophication, live stock grazing and infrastructure developments have become a threat to the lakes. The invasive weeds are Parthenium hysterophorus, Mikania micrantha, Pontederia crassipes, Leersia hexandra, and Pistia stratiotes. The major exotic fish species include Tilapia nilotica (Tilapia) and Clarias gariepinus (African catfish).
