= Phoksundo Lake =

Lake in Nepal

- फोक्सुण्डो, pronounced [pʰoksuɳɖo]
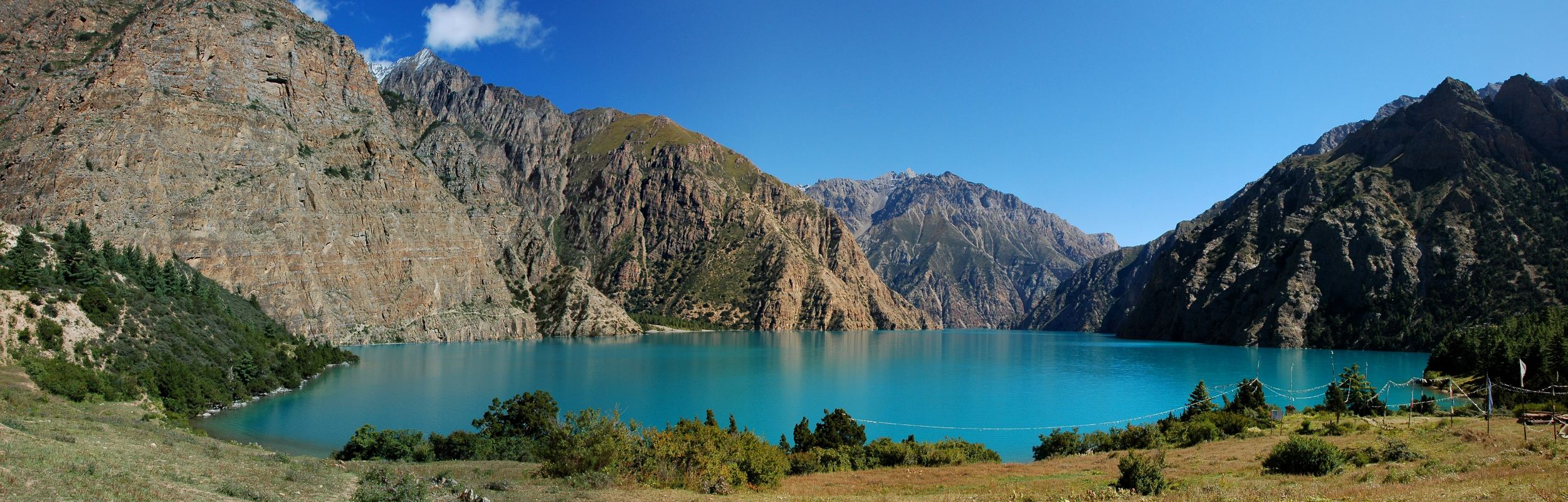

- Location within Karnali Province Location within Nepal Location within South Asia
- Interactive map of Phoksundo Lake
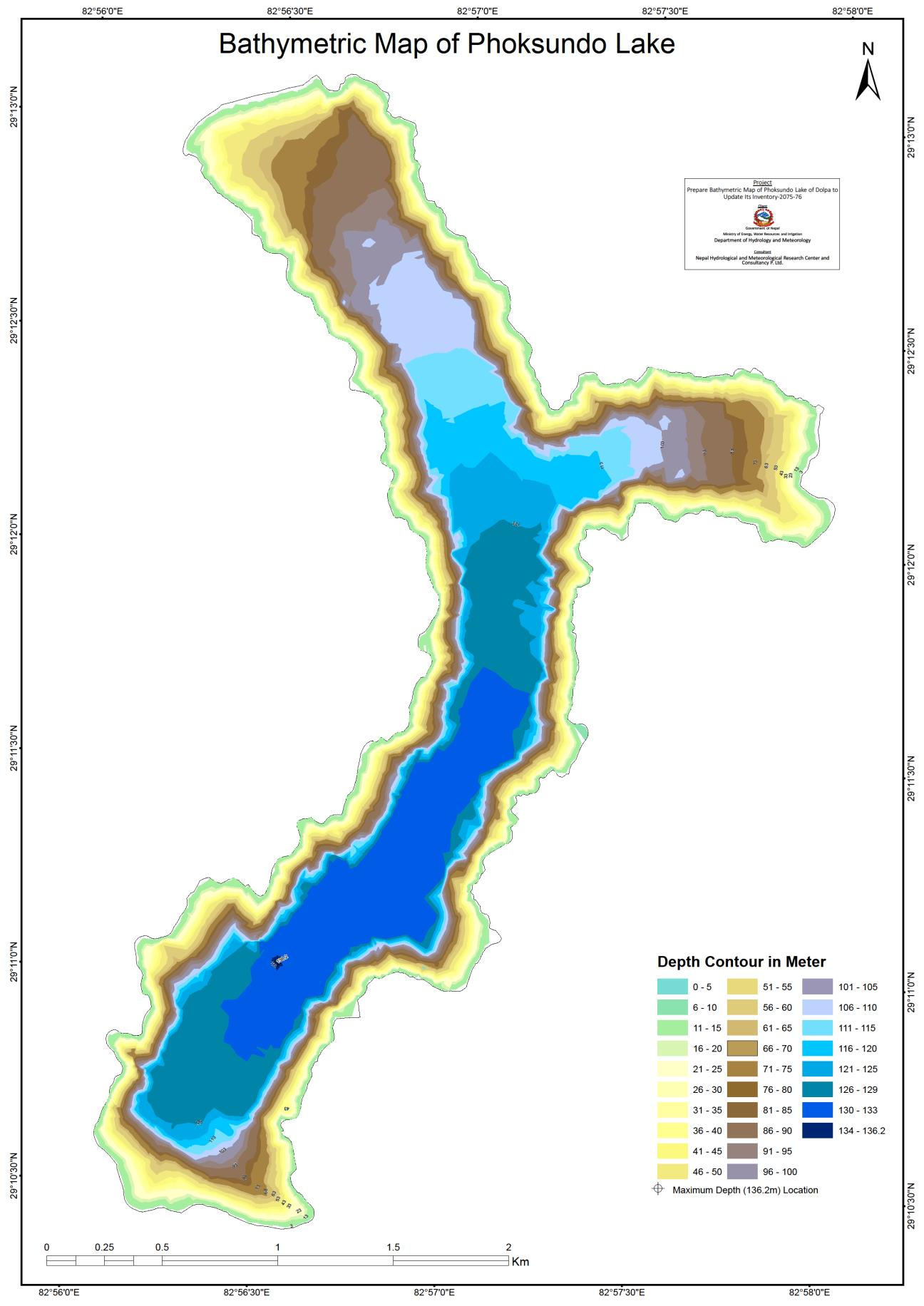
- Bathymetric Map of Phoksundo Lake published by Department of Hydrology and Meteorology in 2019
- Location: Dolpa District, Nepal
- Coordinates: 29°12′30″N 82°57′30″E
- Primary outflows: Suligad River
- Basin countries: Nepal
- Max. length: 5.64 km (3.50 mi)
- Max. width: 549.89–975.24 m (1,804.1–3,199.6 ft)
- Surface area: 485 ha (4.85 km^{2})
- Max. depth: 136.20 m (446.9 ft)
- Water volume: 398.73×10^{6} m^{3} (14.081×10^{9} cu ft)
- Shore length^{1}: 18,295.26 m (60,023.8 ft)
- Surface elevation: 3,589 m (11,775 ft)

Ramsar Wetland
- Designated: 23 September 2007
- Reference no.: 1694
- ^{1} Shore length is not a well-defined measure.

Phoksundo Lake is an alpine fresh water oligotrophic lake in Nepal's Shey Phoksundo National Park at an elevation of 3,611.5 m (11,849 ft) in the Dolpa District. Phoksundo Lake is 494 ha (1.91 sq mi) in size with a water volume of 409,000,000 m^{3} (1.44×10^{10} cu ft) and a discharge of 3.715 m^{3}/s (131.2 cu ft/s). In 2004, a survey by the Department of Hydrology and Meteorology measured the maximum depth of the lake at 145 m (476 ft). In 2019, another detailed survey was carried out by the Department of Hydrology and Meteorology, which measured the maximum depth of the lake at 136.20 m (446.9 ft).

In September 2007, Phoksundo Lake has been designated a Ramsar site.

On the lake' southern end, the village of Ringmo sits on the 30,000- to 40,000-year-old landslide dam that formed the lake. Past the dam, the waters of the lake plunge over a 167 m (548 ft) tall waterfall.

== Religious significance ==
There are more than 20 Tibetan stupas in the northern belt, and one gompa in the eastern side of the lake, where annual prayers and worship are carried out. Traditional Tibetan culture prevails in upper Dolpo; Buddhism and Masto are prevalent in lower Dolpo, including Ringmo village.
