= Shey Phoksundo National Park =

National Park of Nepal

- Nepali: शे-फोक्सुण्डो राष्ट्रिय निकुञ्ज
- IUCN category II (national park)
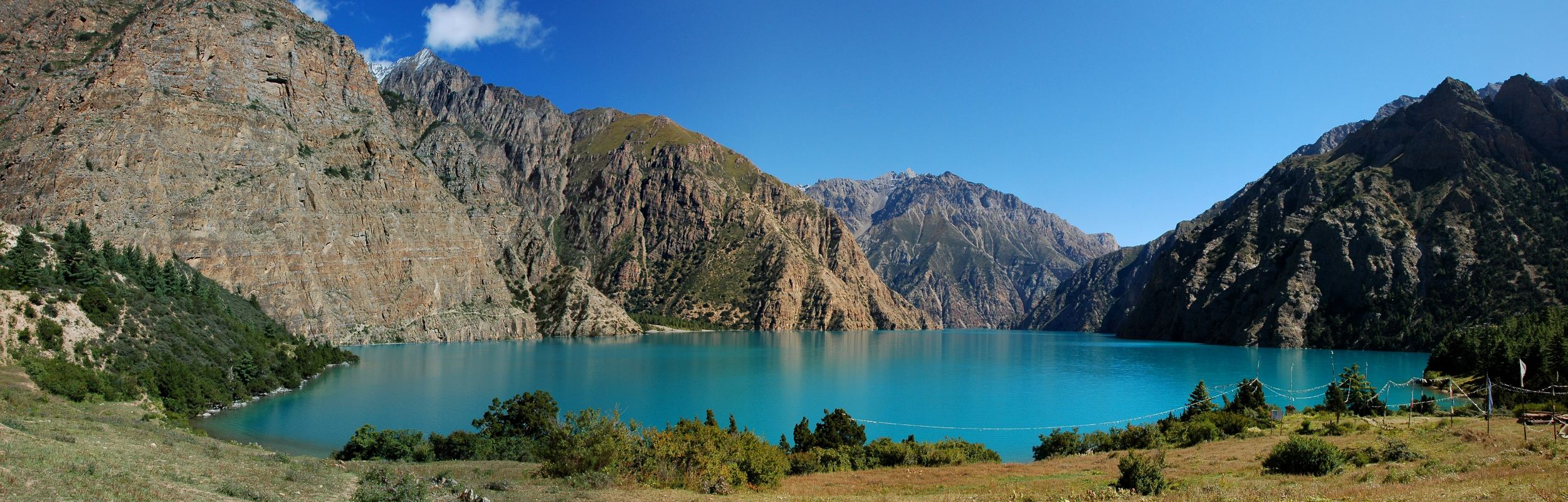
- Phoksundo Lake

- Location within Karnali Province Location within Nepal Location within South Asia
- Interactive map of Shey Phoksundo National Park
- Location: Nepal
- Coordinates: 29°21′29″N 82°50′44″E
- Area: 3,555 km^{2} (1,373 sq mi)
- Established: 1984
- Governing body: Department of National Parks and Wildlife Conservation

Shey Phoksundo National Park is the largest and only trans-Himalayan national park in Nepal. It was established in 1984 and covers an area of 3,555 km^{2} (1,373 sq mi) in the districts of Dolpa and Mugu in the Mid-Western Region, Nepal. The protected area ranges in elevation from 2,130 to 6,885 m (6,988 to 22,589 ft). Phoksundo Lake is the park's prominent feature, located at an elevation of 3,612 m (11,850 ft).

The park's headquarters are in Palam, Dolpa District.

== Geography ==
The park's elevation varies from 2,130 m (6,990 ft) in the southeast near Ankhe to 6,883 m (22,582 ft) at the summit of Kanjiroba Himal at the southern edge of the Tibetan Plateau. Phoksundo Lake at an elevation of 3,660 m (12,010 ft) in the upper reaches of the Suligad river is surrounded by glaciers and is known for its turquoise color.

Phoksundo Lake has a water surface of 494 ha (1,220 acres), and was declared a Ramsar site in September 2007. The lake is up to 145 m (476 ft) deep, measured using echo-sounding technology.

The Langu river drains the high Dolpo plateau located in the north-east of the park. The Suligad and Jugdual rivers form the southern catchment flowing south into the Thuli Bheri River.

== Ecology ==
=== Fauna ===
90 snow leopards, with a density of 2.21 snow leopards per 100 km^{2}, were found during the study conducted from 2019 to 2022 by Department of National Parks and Wildlife Conservation, supported by the World Wildlife Fund (WWF). Other endangered species found in the park include grey wolf, musk deer, bharal, goral, argali, Himalayan tahr, leopard and Himalayan black bear.

== Culture ==
Several gompas are within the park including Shey Gompa, which was established in the 11th century.
