= Raffaele Masto =

Italian writer, journalist, and radio host (1953–2020)

Raffaele Masto (12 December 1953 – 28 March 2020) was an Italian journalist, writer and radio host.

== Biography ==
Masto was born in Milan in 1953. From 1989, he worked as journalist at the foreign news office of Radio Popolare. He was sent to Middle East, Latin America and especially to Africa, the continent where he found the inspiration for many of his essays, mainly published by Sperling & Kupfer and by Baldini & Castoldi. Also in Africa he made several documentaries and reportages on political, social and anthropological themes.

For many years he wrote for the magazine Africa, for which he edited the in-depth analysis blog Buongiorno Africa ("Good morning, Africa").

In his books, always based on direct experience as a foreign correspondent, Masto dealt with the themes of poverty and injustice that affect the peoples of the Third World. During his travels, he was repeatedly a guest at the centers of the Milanese NGO Amani in Nairobi.

In 2019, he married his longtime partner Gisele Kra, from the Ivory Coast. In late 2019, Masto was hospitalized in Bergamo where he underwent a successful heart transplant; while recovering in hospital, in February 2020, he was infected by SARS-Cov-2 during the COVID-19 pandemic in Italy, leading to his death in Bergamo on 28 March 2020, at age 66.

== Books ==
- 1998 – La nuova colonizzazione, Baldini& Castoldi Dalai
- 2000 – Debito da morire, Baldini& Castoldi Dalai
- 2001 – No Global, Zelig Editrice
- 2002 – Informazione negata, Zelig Editrice
- 2003 – In Africa. Ritratto di un continente senza pace, Sperling & Kupfer
- 2005 – Io Safiya, Sperling & Kupfer
- 2006 – L'Africa del tesoro. Diamanti, oro, petrolio, Sperling & Kupfer
- 2008 – La scelta di Said. Storia di un kamikaze, Sperling & Kupfer
- 2011 – Buongiorno Africa, Bruno Mondadori
- 2016 – Califfato Nero, Laterza
- 2019 – La variabile africana. Riserve naturali ed equilibrio geopolitico del pianeta, Egea
