= John Baird Tyson =

John Baird Tyson, OBE, MC, (7 April 1928, in Partick – 10 March 2014) was a British school teacher who mapped previously unexplored areas of the Himalayas. Tyson's father was deputy headmaster at St Paul's School in London, where he was brought up. He attended Rugby School, and was later a geography teacher there for 17 years, followed by National Service. He commissioned as a second lieutenant in the Argyll and Sutherland Highlanders in 1947 and served in Malaya during the Emergency, attached to the Seaforth Highlanders. He proved to be an aggressive and very successful platoon commander and was awarded the Military Cross in 1949. After military service, Tyson read Geography at Magdalen College, Oxford. In 1952, he led the first Oxford University Scientific Expedition to the Himalayas - the start of a lifetime's attachment to that region. Between 1978 and 1982, Tyson served as the Headmaster of Reed's School. In 1983, he returned to Kathmandu and served as the Headmaster of the British-administered Budhanilkantha School, holding the position until 1988. He died in 2014. The Daily Telegraph published his obituary.

== Kanjiroba Himal ==
In 1963 the Royal Geographical Society recognised Tyson's work in the Kanjiroba Himal with the Ness Award.
