= Latikoili =

Latikoili लाटीकोइली
- Village development committee
- Location in Nepal
- Coordinates: 28.55°N 81.64°E
- Country: Nepal
- Zone: Bheri Zone
- District: Surkhet District

Population (2011)
  - Total: 19,963
- Time zone: UTC+5:45 (Nepal Time)

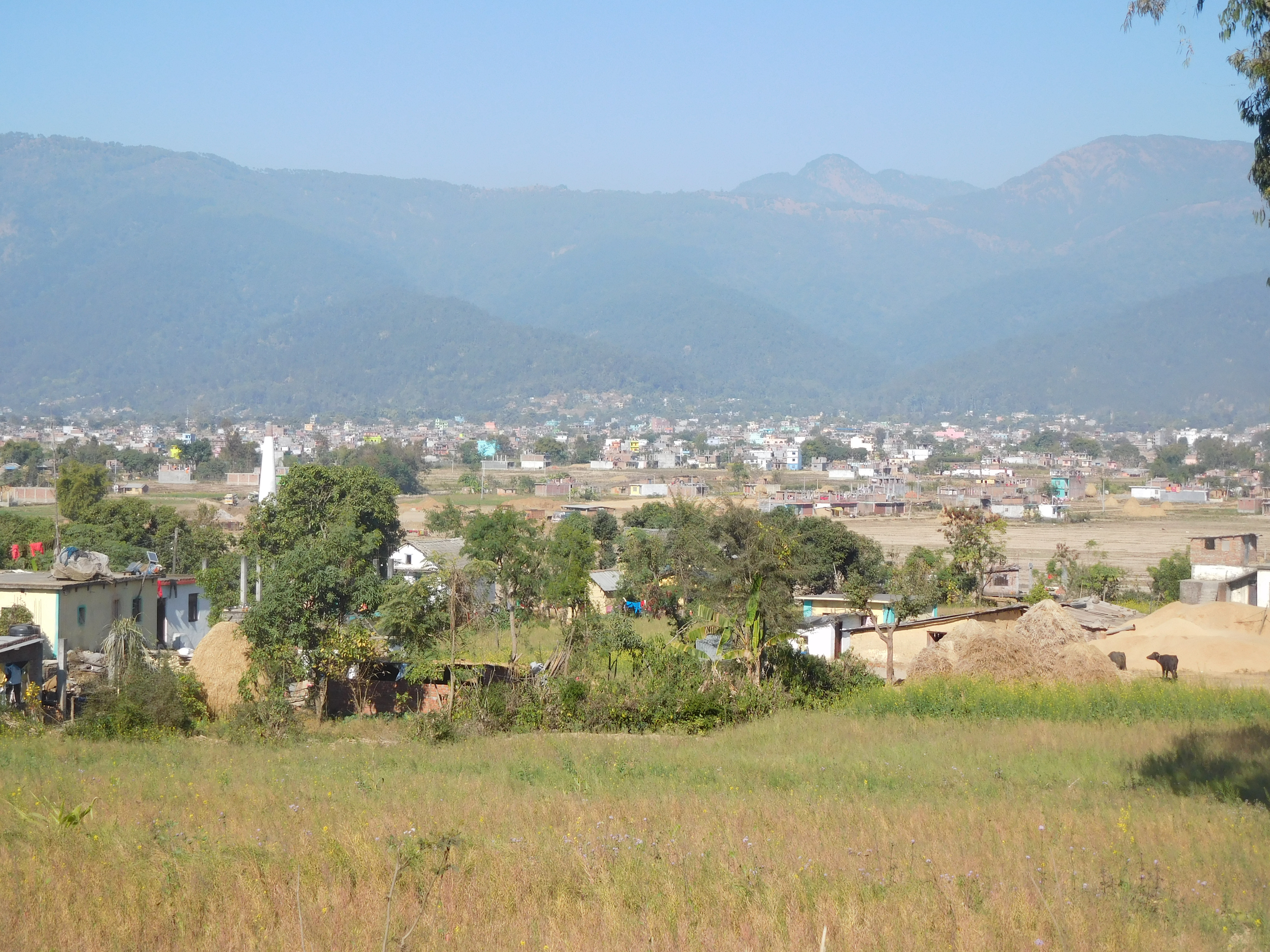
View of Surkhet valley from Latikoili

Latikoili is a village development committee in Surkhet District in the Bheri Zone of mid-western Nepal. At the time of the 2011 Nepal census it had a population of 19,963 people living in 4,330 individual households.
