= Kohalpur =

Municipality in Lumbini Province, Nepal

Kohalpur कोहलपुर Kohalpur Bazar
- Municipality (नगरपालिका)
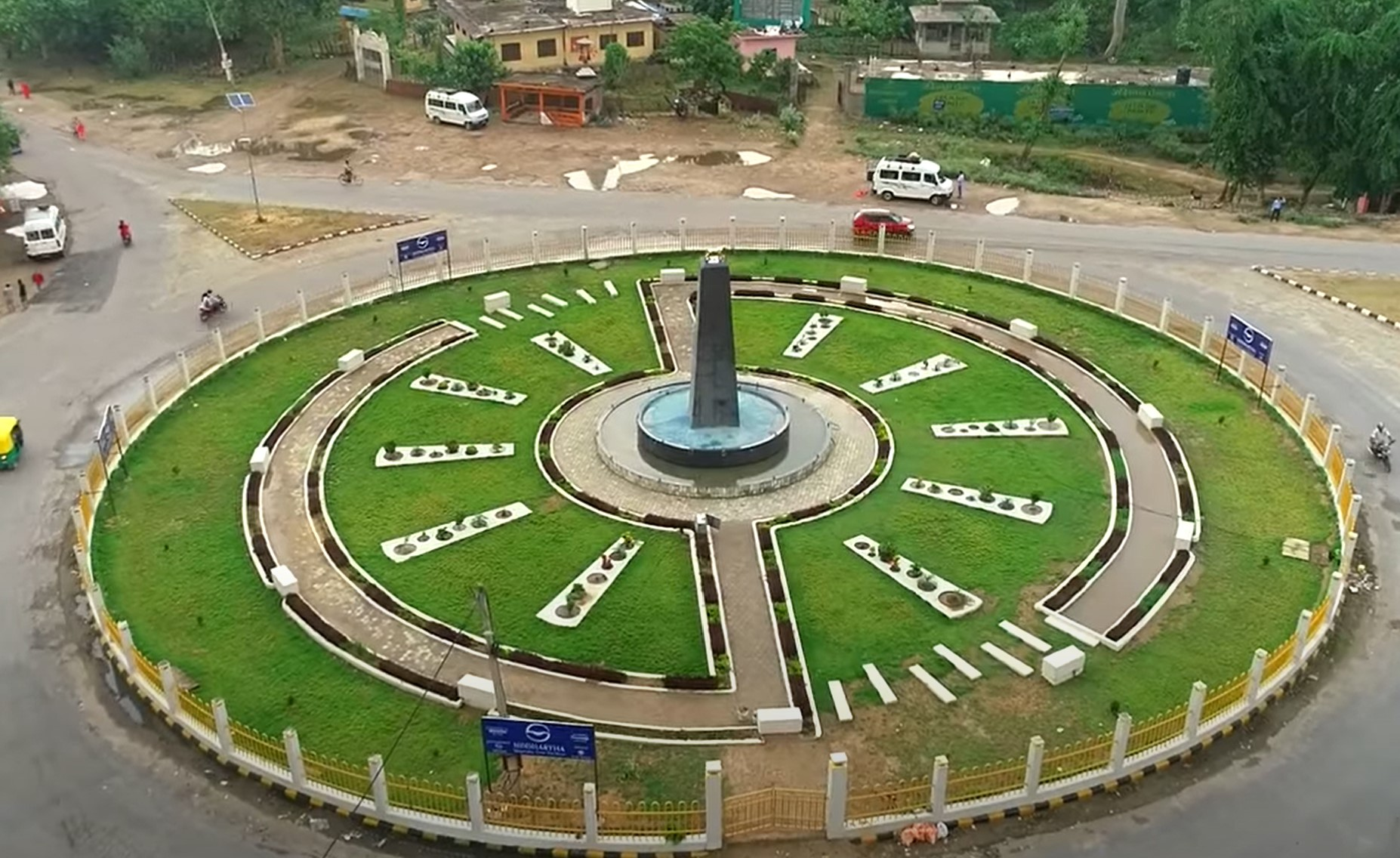
- Roundabout at Kohalpur Chowk (2019)

- Location in Lumbini Province Kohalpur (Nepal)
- Coordinates: 28°11′55″N 81°41′28″E
- Country: Nepal
- Province: Lumbini
- District: Banke

Government
  - Mayor: Purna Acharya (NC)
  - Deputy Mayor: Sangita Subedi (NC)

Area
  - Total: 685 km^{2} (264 sq mi)

Population (2021)
  - Total: 100,289
  - Density: 146/km^{2} (379/sq mi)
- Time zone: UTC+5:45 (NST)
- Postal code: 21904
- Area code: 081
- Website: www.kohalpurmun.gov.np

Kohalpur (Nepali: कोहलपुर) is a municipality in Banke District of Lumbini province of Nepal. The municipality was established on 18 May 2014 merging the existing two Village Development Committees i.e. Rajhena and Kohalpur. The town is in East-West highway and one of the fastest developing places in Nepal. A neighboring city Nepalgunj is on South (16 km [9.9 mi]), with Ghorahi city (135 km [84 mi]) to west in Dang District and towards south further 6 km (3.7 mi) is the Indian border. In fact it is a growing city in the western region of Nepal. It has a junction to diverse the roadway transport to east, west, north and south from the city.

It is accessible by air (Nepalgunj Airport) and by road (535 km [332 mi] west of Kathmandu).

== Kohalpur Municipality ==
Kohalpur is second municipality in the Banke District, with the first being Nepalgunj.

As a municipality, Kohalpur will assume greater local government autonomy and greater financial resources as part of the central governments' effort to promote decentralized power.

The municipality status of Kohalpur has been repeatedly stalled due to the failure to ratify the national constitution. A fourth deadline to ratify the constitution was missed on 27 May 2012. However, it has now been officially declare a municipality as of 2018.

== Administrative structure ==
Kohalpur is within the Banke District. The DDC (District Development Committee) of the Banke District was recently assumed by a Local Development Officer appointed by the government. Kohalpur has been declared as a municipality, but this has not been officiated in the absence of a ratified national constitution. Currently, it remains as a Village Development Committee (VDC), with 9 wards, each with a Ward Citizen Forum (WCF) serving as a community-level authority.

The VDC of Kohalpur has been managed over the last 5-year transition period, by a government nominated and appointed secretary. Projects of urban development within the district are prioritized and approved by the District Council before implementation. Although the community does not have legal power, CBOs play a crucial role in Kohalpur's development. Through the WCF, they collaborate with the VDC and other organizations to carry out projects at the local level.

In Kohalpur there is also autonomous area called Town Development Committees (TDC). The purpose of TDC in Nepal is to organise people structurally at local level and creating a partnership between the community and the public sector for improved service delivery system. A TDC has a status as an autonomous institution and authority for interacting with the more centralised institutions of governance in Nepal. In doing so, the TDC has an element of control and responsibility in development, and also ensures proper utilization and distribution of state funds and a greater interaction between government officials, NGOs and agencies. The TDC within a given area will discuss education, water supply, basic health, sanitation and income and will also monitor and record progress which is displayed in census data.

== Geography ==
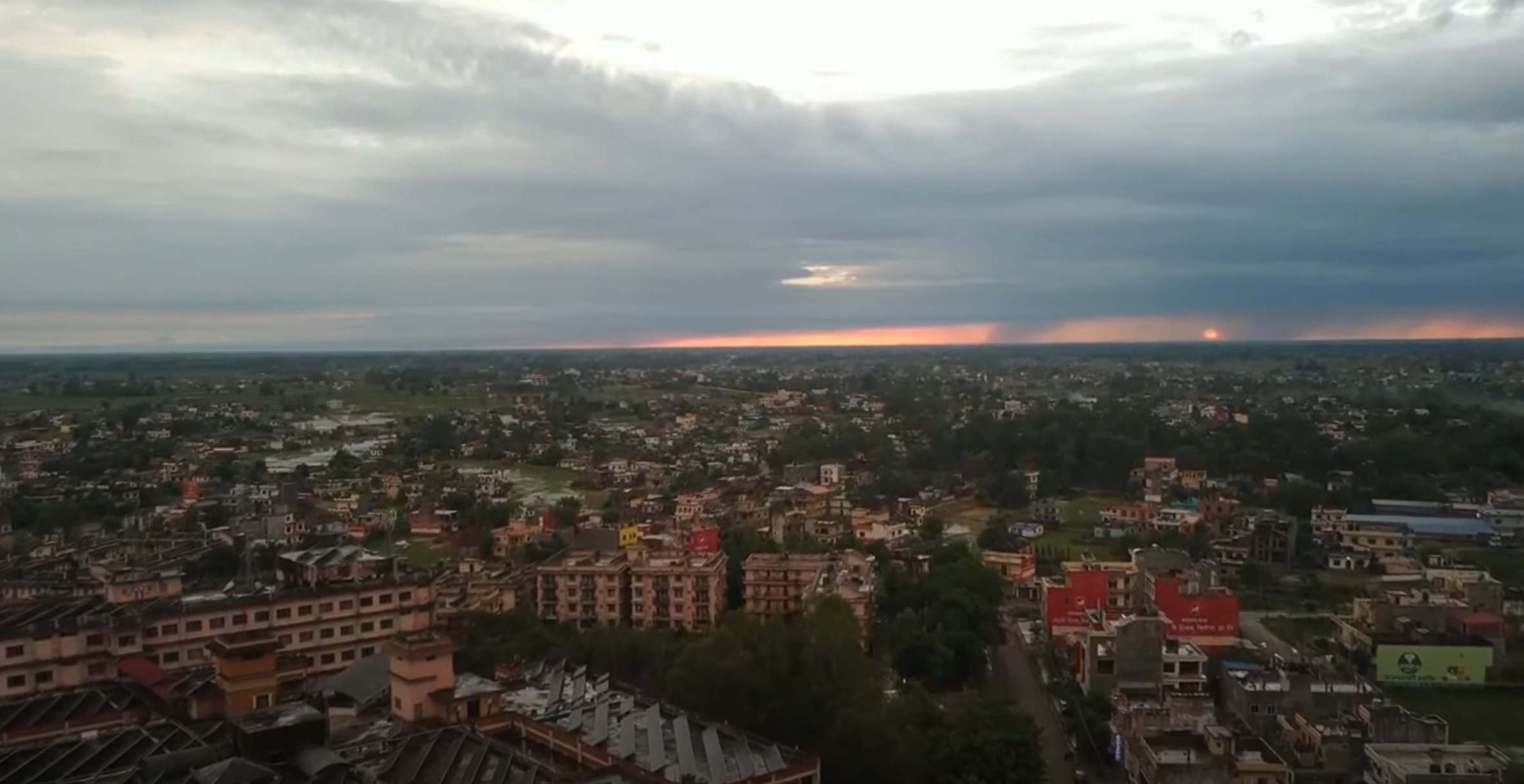
Aerial view of Kohalpur city at dusk

Kohalpur is located in the Banke District in the Mid-West Region of Nepal (Terai region), with a total area of 2,816.6 hectares (6,960 acres). The climate is subtropical and the temperature varies between a maximum of 46 °C and minimum of -2 °C.

== Environmental ==
Kohalpur has a total forest area of 1,025.1 hectares (2,533 acres) which is connected with the Bardia National Park in the Bardiya District. The forest area is currently threatened by deforestation; 16.20 hectares (40.0 acres) were deforested in 2010. The land of the Village Development Committee (VDC) of Kohalpur designated for agriculture is 1,452.8 hectares (3,590 acres), from that area 91% is used in agricultural purposes. The population affected by flooding is located near the Dudhuwa River, which crosses part of Kohalpur in the south-north direction. Around 185.8 hectares (459 acres) of the VDC are affected by flooding.

Now Sikta Irrigation Project is Launching which come from Rapti River. People who are farmer of expected from this project. This project is ambitious project of Nepal.

== Demographics ==
As of 2021, Kohalpur Municipality had a population of 100,289.

At the time of the 2011 Nepal census, Kohalpur Municipality had a population of 72,748. Of these, 65.3% spoke Nepali, 24.0% Tharu, 5.0% Awadhi, 2.5% Urdu, 1.0% Magar, 0.8% Maithili, 0.6% Hindi, 0.4% Newar, 0.1% Gurung and 0.3% other languages as their first language.

In terms of ethnicity/caste, 24.7% were Tharu, 20.4% Chhetri, 15.8% Hill Brahmin, 8.3% Magar, 7.1% Thakuri, 6.8% Kami, 3.0% Musalman, 2.1% Damai/Dholi, 1.8% Yadav and 10.0% others.

In terms of religion, 93.2% were Hindu, 3.0% Muslim, 2.4% Christian and 1.4% Buddhist.

== Economy ==
The main activity of the working population of Kohalpur is involved in agriculture and livestock (52.88%); the rest of the population earn their life in day labour (21.90%), business (11.27%), government and non- government organization work (13.86%) and small industry (0.09%).

== Education ==
The Municipality has three college campuses, six higher secondary (10+2) units, four lower secondary units (1-7) and 12 primary (1-5) schools.

Nepalgunj Medical College Teaching Hospital, Kohalpur, is one of the most important education centres of Kohalpur; it receives students from all around the country and also from India and, Sri Lanka.

Some schools and college are listed below:

- Tribhuwan Secondary School
- Bridge International School
- Green Peace Secondary School
- Bageshwari Academy
- Shri Ram Janaki Secondary School
- Gorkha united public School
- Takshashila Academy, Banke
- Dynamic Secondary School
- Kohalpur Model College (KMC)
- Gyan Jyoti Secondary School, Chappargaudi
- Baljyoti Secondary School, NTV road

== Infrastructure and Basic Services ==
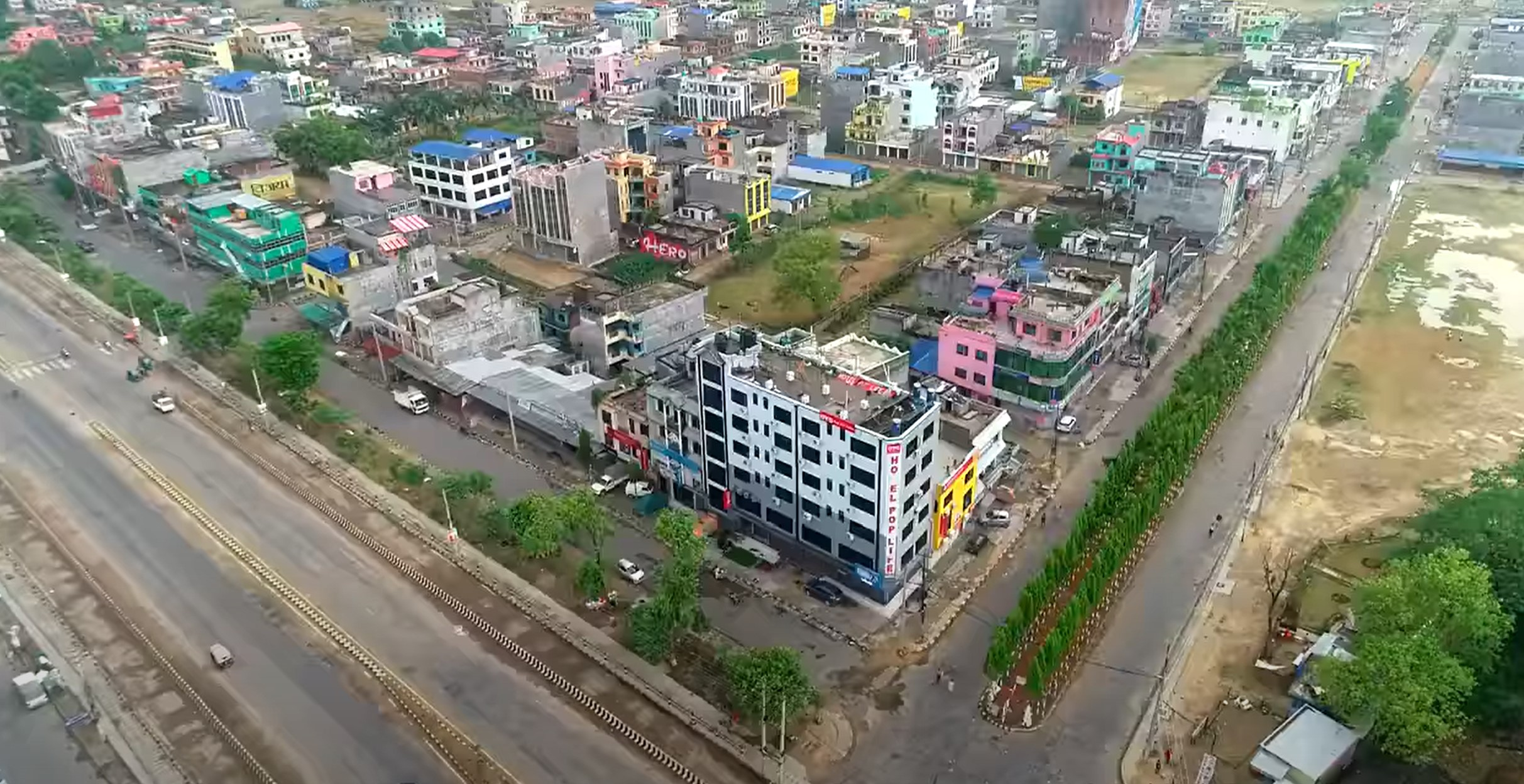
Aerial view of Kohalpur, Ratna Highway on the left

The health infrastructure facilities include the Medical College, located on the west side of the VDC, one Health post, one Sub-Health post and 13 private medical centres. Basic services do not cover all of Kohalpur's population and are sometimes limited to the planned area of the VDC, which is in Ward Number 3. There is no official solid waste management system in Kohalpur; garbage collection, disposal and treatment are services that should be developed and provided for the population.

Regarding water infrastructure, 68% of the VDC households have water pipelines while 31.15% use hand pump systems to obtain underground water; the rest of the households use other sources. In terms of sanitation, of the total 4735 households in Kohalpur VDC, 1548 do not have a toilet. Septic tanks are used by 2046 households, 841 use temporary toilets, 131 have biogas toilets and 169 units are connected to a collecting open canal. The existing central electricity line of Kohalpur VDC covers 87% of the households, 13% are without electricity and use kerosene. A small part of the remaining households use alternative environmentally friendly sources such as solar panels and biogas.

== Political Context ==
Due to political changes and the generated instability in Nepal from the past middle century, people from the hill area migrated to the Terai region. Kohalpur's population is composed in part by this population and others which arrived looking for better opportunities due to the fertile agricultural conditions of the land.

The current political situation in Kohalpur is tied to the country's status. In the present time, local authorities are not elected by citizen vote; they are nominated and designated by the government. Consequent to the political instability coming from the national government, there is high political turnover in the local official institutions; most of the appointed officials are recent to their chairs and it is difficult to control and have continuity for steering processes. Citizen participation in official political processes is currently dependent on the upcoming national constitution; in the meanwhile, the VDC affirms to work on the identification system for its citizens.

== Media ==
To Promote local culture Kohalpur has two F.M. Radio Station Community radio namely Pratibodh F.M. - 102.4& Radio Kohalpur - 101.2 MHz.

There are also many local as well as national newspaper publishers including Kantipur and The Kathmandu Post.

For television there are 3 cable operators:

- Bageshwari Cable Pvt. Ltd
- Super Vision Cable Pvt. Ltd
- Madhyapaschim Cable Pvt. Ltd

Kohalpur Television has also now been re-established from Kartik,1 2073. It is a Local form of Nepal television.

== See also ==
- Ghorahi, Nepal
- Nepalgunj
- Surkhet
