= List of village development committees of Nepal =

Nepal's 77 districts (Nepali: जिल्ला) are subdivided into localities known as village development committees (Nepali: गाउँ विकास समिति, romanized: gāun bikās samiti) and into municipalities. There were 3,157 VDCs in Nepal. District wise list of VDCs (most of the case not updated names) are as follows:

As of 10 March 2017, VDCs were dissolved and were replaced by Gaunpalikas. Gaupalikas means rural municipality.

== Eastern Development Region ==
=== Mechi Zone ===
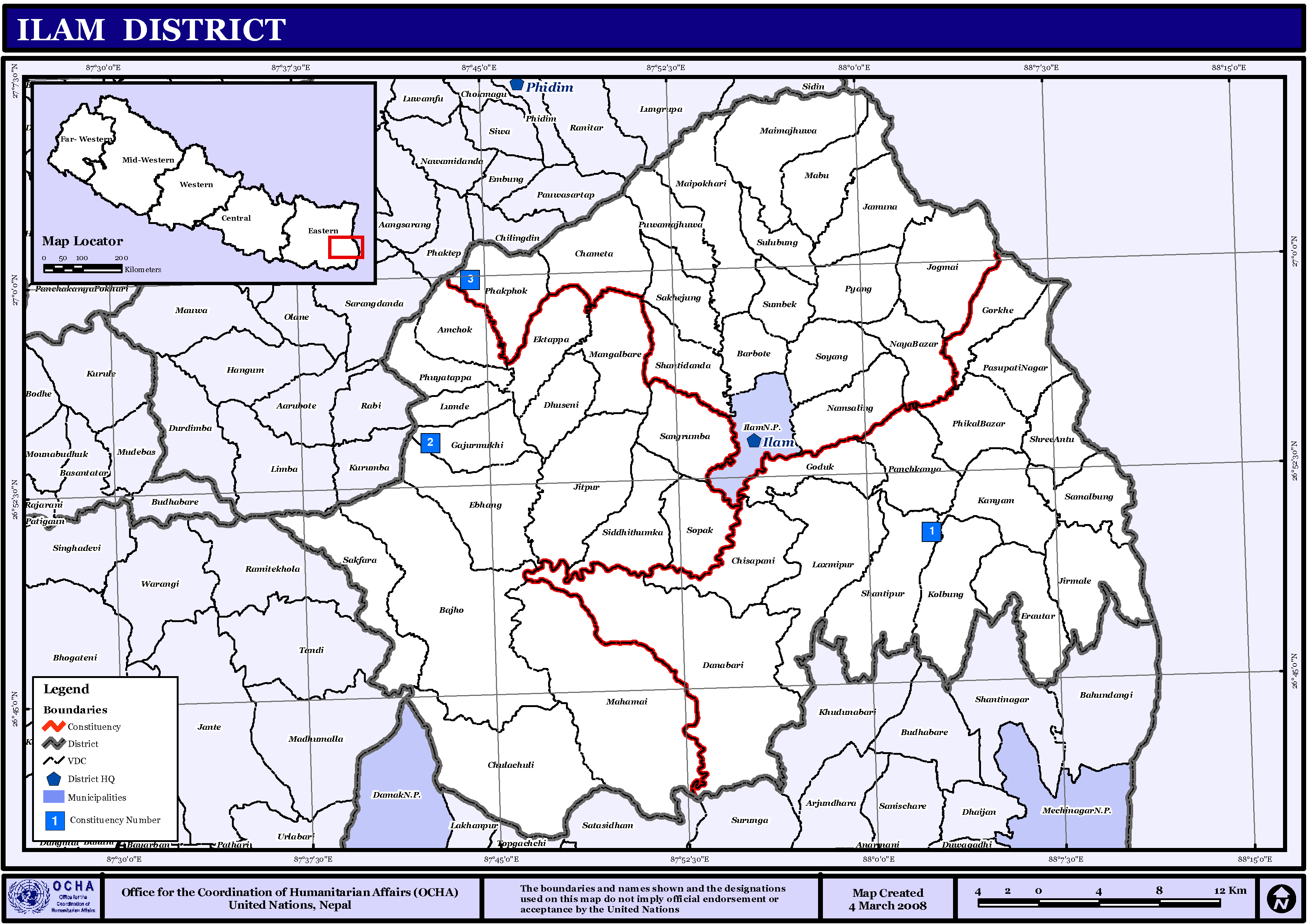
Ilam District

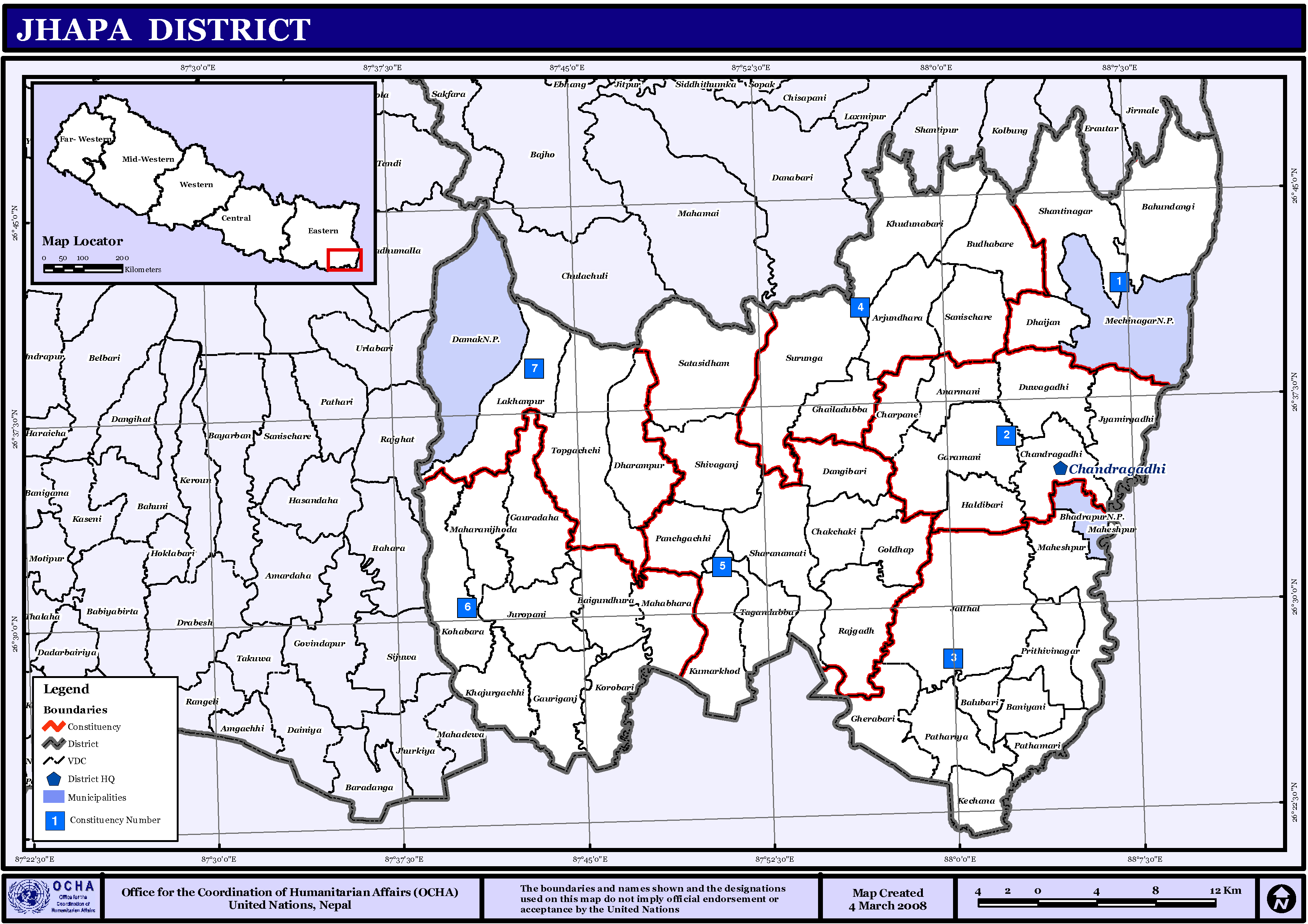
Jhapa District

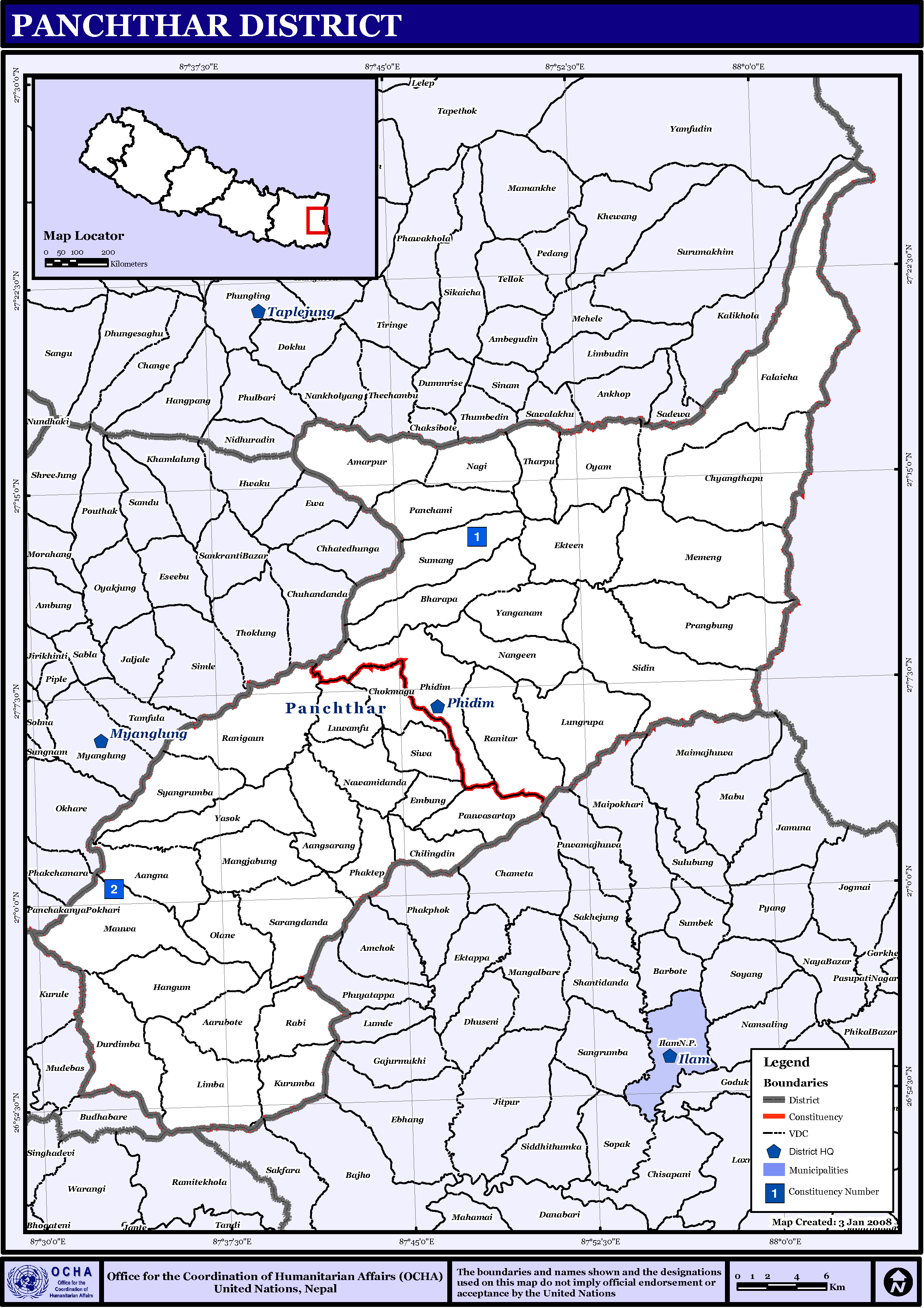
Panchthar District

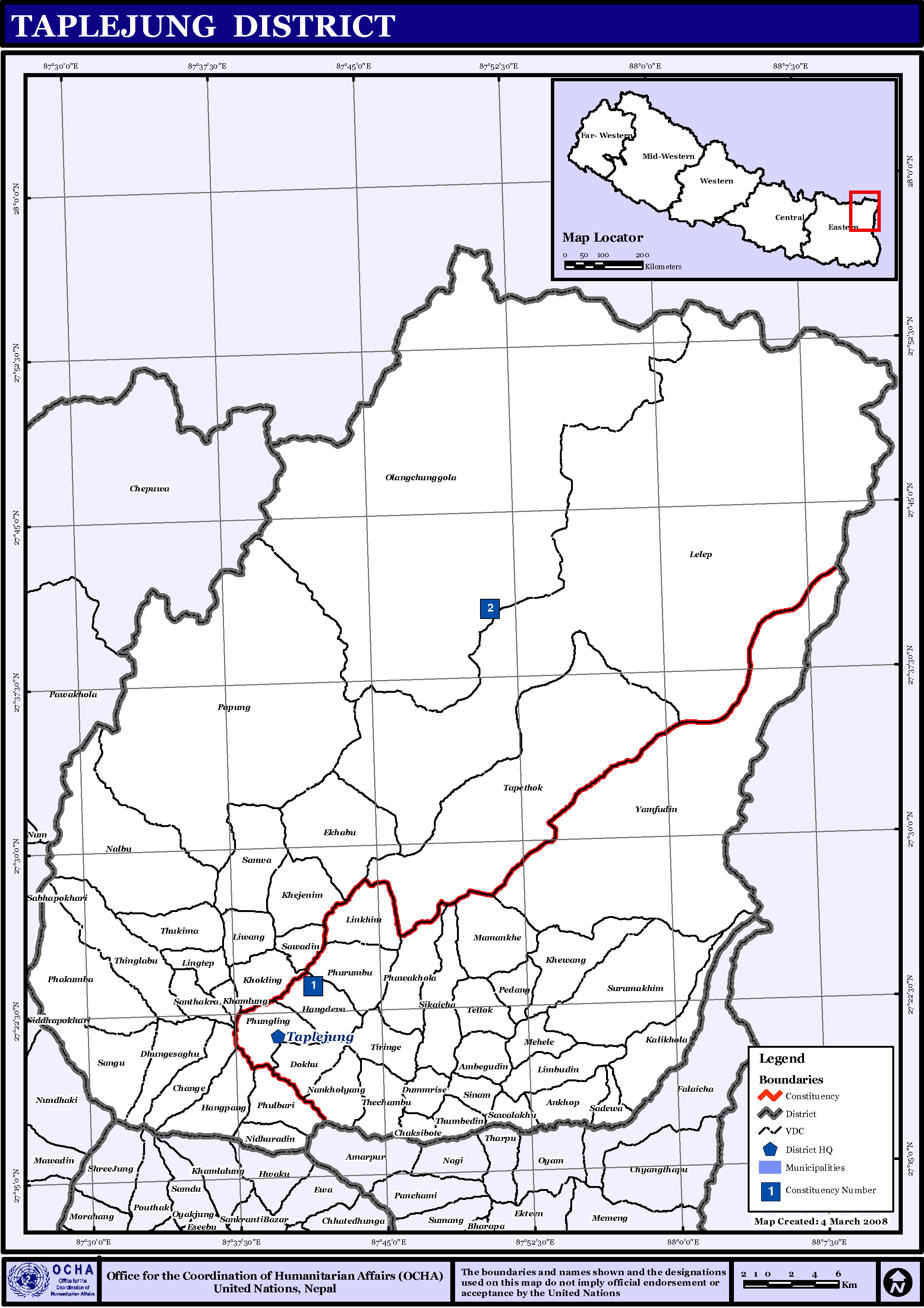
Taplejung District

==== Ilam District ====
Amchok, Bajho, Barbote, Chamaita, Chisapani, Chulachuli, Danabari, Dhuseni, Ebhang, Ektappa, Emang, Erautar, Gajurmukhi, Godak, Gorkhe, Jamuna, Jirmale, Jitpur, Jogmai, Kolbung, Lakshmipur, Lumbe, Mabu, Mahamai, Maimajhuwa, Maipokhari, Namsaling, Naya Bazar, Pashupatinagar, Phakphok, Phuyatappa, Puwamajwa, Pyang, Sakphara, Sakhejung, Samalpung, Sangrumba, Shanti Danda, Shantipur, Siddhithumka, Soyak, Soyang, Sri Antu, Sulubung, Sumbek

==== Jhapa District ====
Anarmani, Bahundangi, Baiagundhara, Balubari, Baniyani, Budhabare, Chakchaki, Chandragadhi, Charpane, Dangibari, Dhaijan, Dharampur, Duhagadhi, Garamani, Gauriganj, Gherabari, Goldhhap, Haldibari, Jalthal, Jyamirgadhi, Kechana, Khajurgachhi, Khudunabari, Korobari, Kumarkhod, Lakhanpur, Mahabhara, Maheshpur, Panchganchi, Pathabhari, Pathariya, Prithivinagar, Rajgadh, Shantinagar, Sharanamati, Taghanduba, Topgachchi, Arjundhara Mulpani

==== Panchthar District ====
Ranitar, Luwamphu, Yangnam, Nangin, Lungrupa, Ambarpur, Panchami, Subhang, Bharapa, Yasok, Rani Gaun, Mangjabung, Syabarumba, Aarubote, Sarangdanda, Rabi, Kurumba, Limba, Durdimba, Ektin, Memeng, Prangbung, Yangnam, Sidin, Nawamidanda, Imbung, Pauwa Sartap, Chilingdin, Aangsarang, Phaktep, Aangna, Olane, Hangum, Mauwa, Chyangthapu, Phalaicha, Oyam, Tharpu, Nagi

==== Taplejung District ====
Ambegudin, Ankhop, Chaksibote, Change, Dhungesaghu, Dummrise, Ekhabu, Hangdeva, Hangpang, Kalikhola, Khamlung, Khejenim, Khewang, Khokling, Lelep, Limbudin, Lingtep, Linkhim, Liwang, Mamangkhe, Nalbu, Nankholyang, Nidhuradin, Olangchung Gola, Paidang, Papung, Pedang, Phakumba, Phawakhola, Phulbari, Phurumbu, Sadewa, Sangu, Santhakra, Sawa, Sawadin, Sawalakhu, Sikaicha, Sinam, Surumakhim, Tapethok, Tellok, Thechambu, Thinglabu, Thukima, Thumbedin, Tiringe, Yamphudin

=== Koshi Zone ===
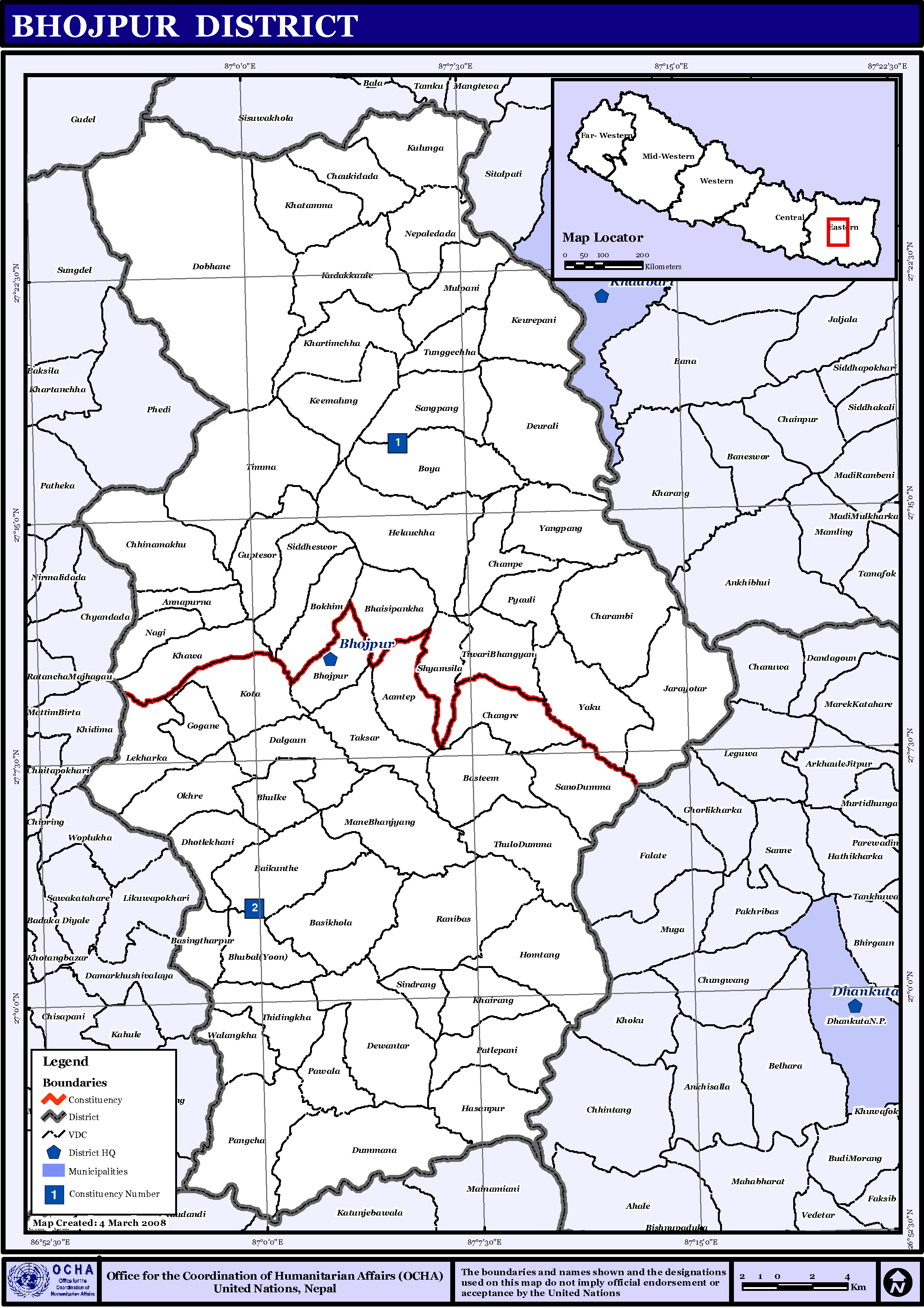
Bhojpur District

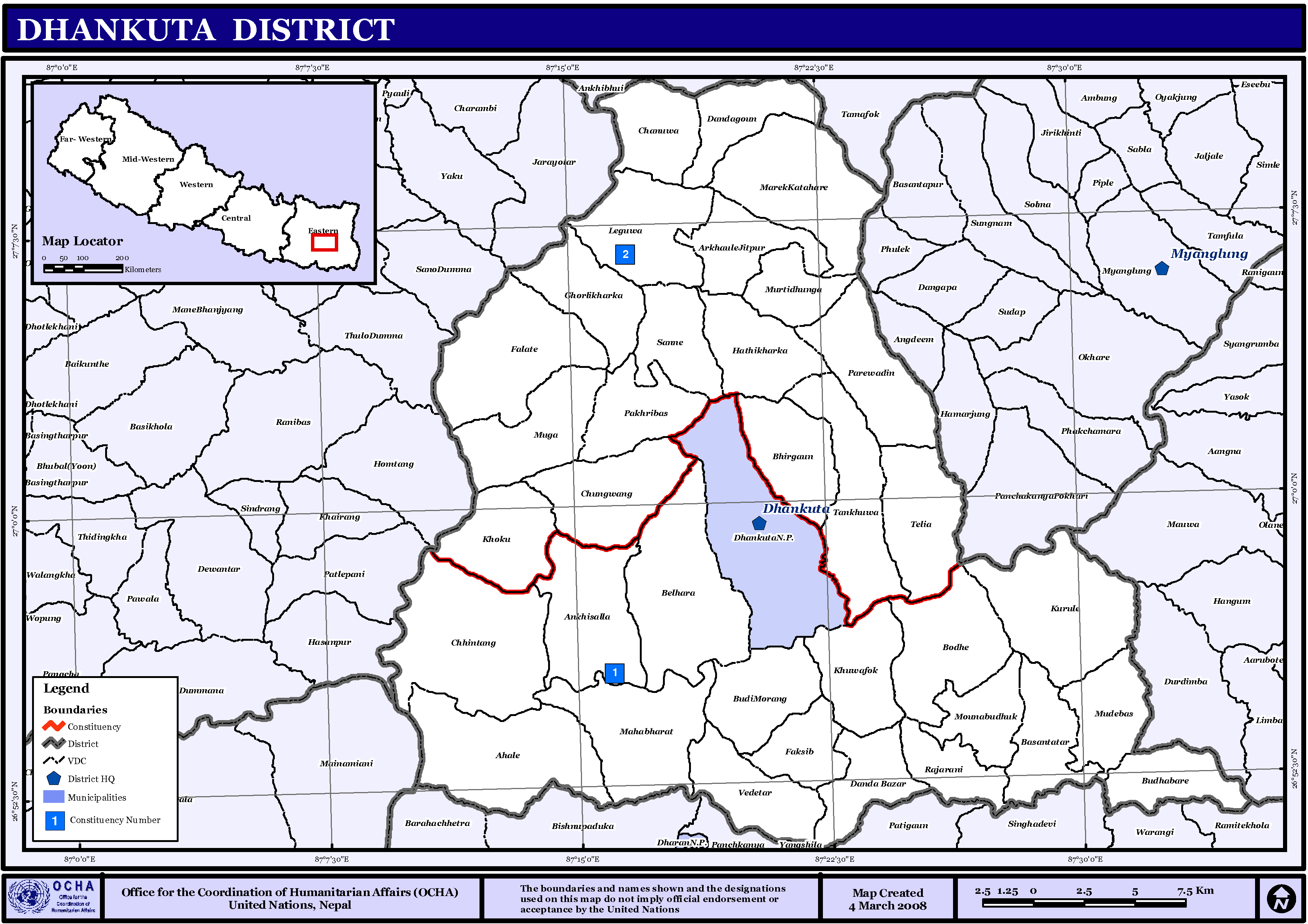
Dhankuta District

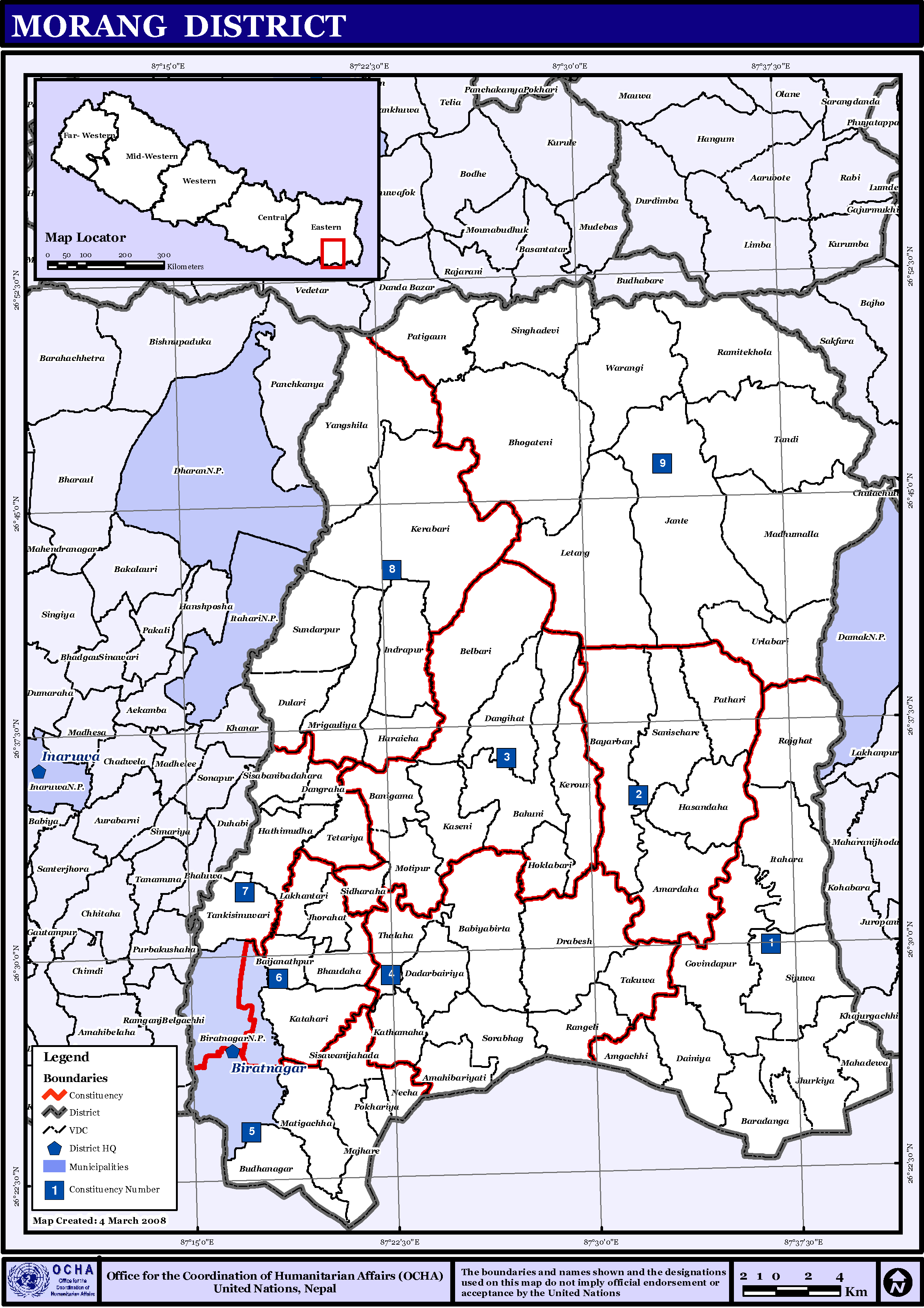
Morang District

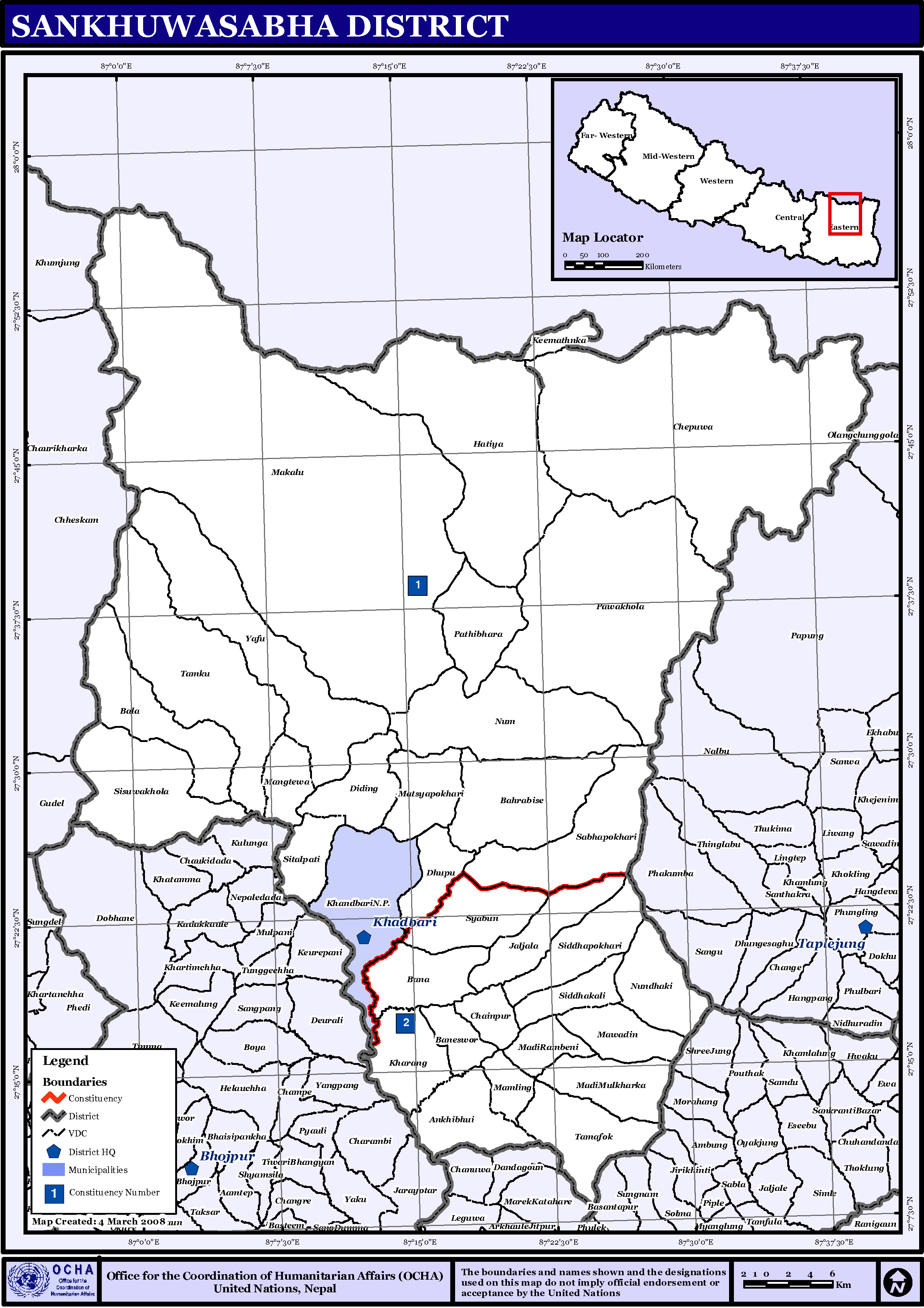
Sankhuwasabha District

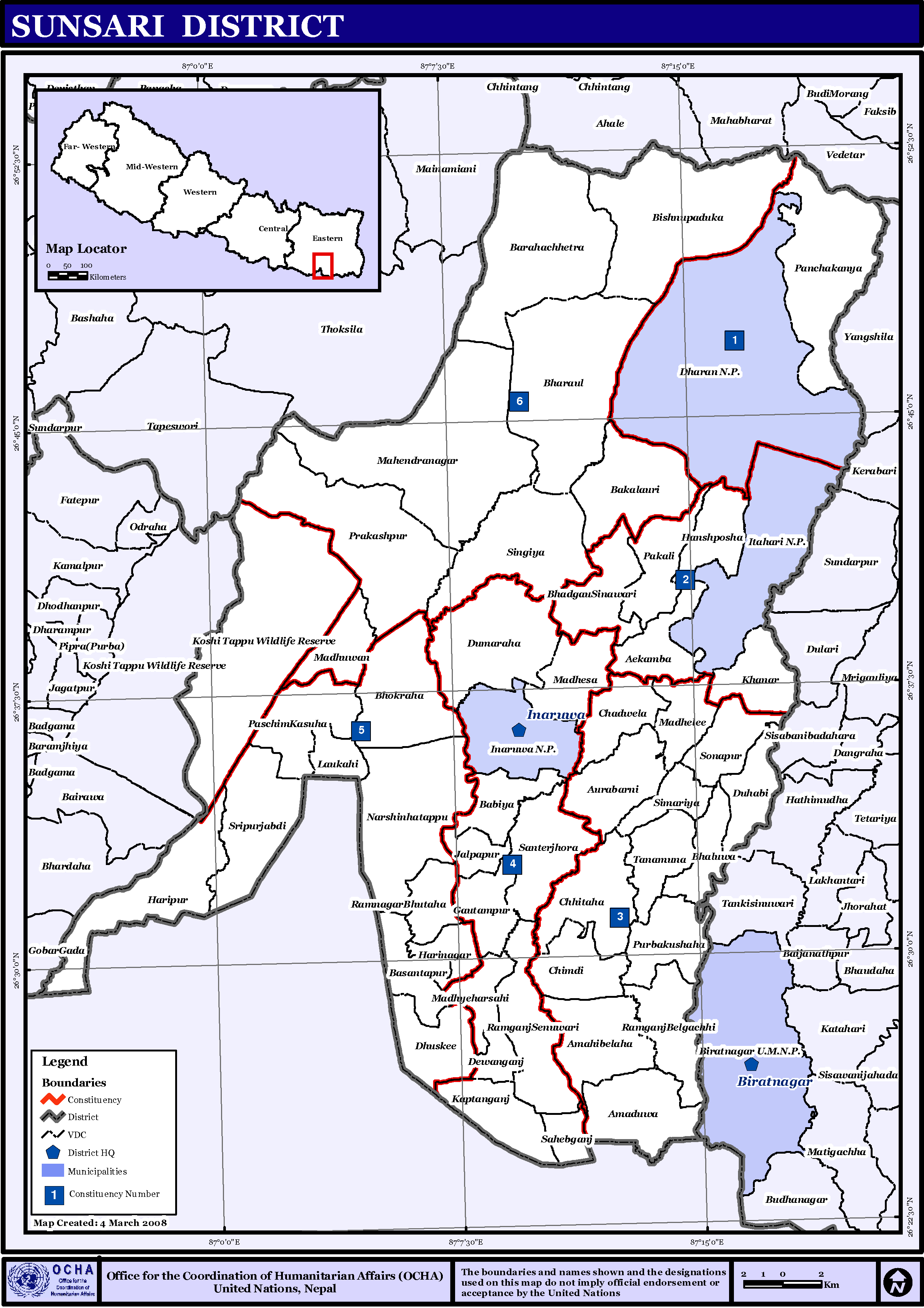
Sunsari District

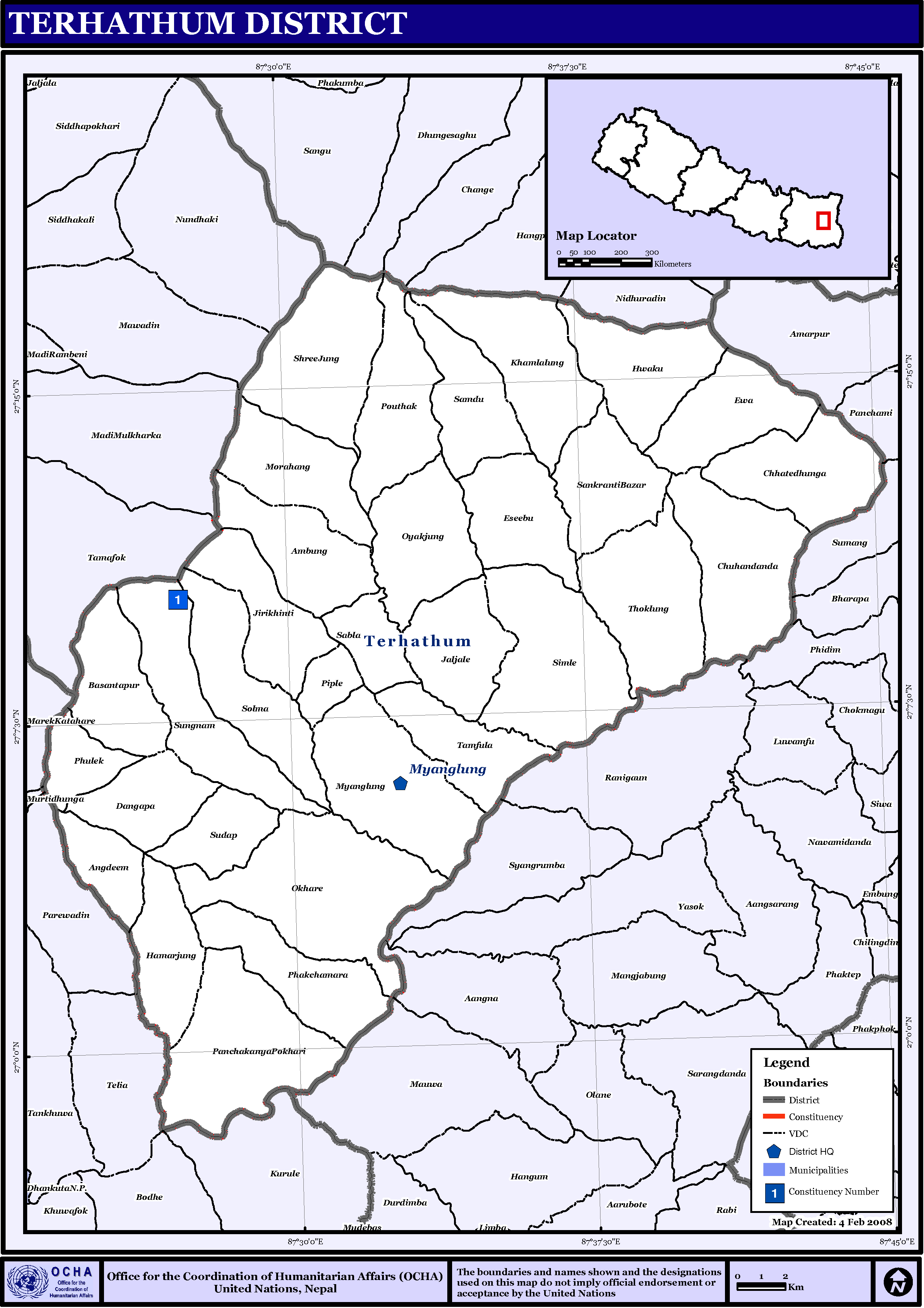
Terhathum District

==== Bhojpur District ====
Aamtek, Annapurna, Baikuntha, Basikhola, Basingtharpur, Bastim, Bhubal, Bhulke, Boya, Champe, Changre, Charambi, Chaukidada, Chhinamukh, Dalgaun, Deurali, Dewantar, Dhodalekhani, Dobhane, Dummana, Gogane, Gupteshwar, Hasanpur, Helauchha, Homtang, Jarayotar, Khairang, Khatamma, Khawa, Kot, Kudak Kaule, Kulunga, Lekharka, Mane Bhanjyang, Nagi, Nepaledanda, Okhre, Pangcha, Patle Pani, Pawala, Pyauli, Ranibas, Sangpang, Sano Dumba, Shyamsila, Siddheshwar, Sindrang, Syamsila, Thidingkha, Thulo Dumba, Timma, Tiwari Bhanjyang, Walangkha, Yaku, Yangpang

==== Dhankuta District ====
Ahale, Ankhisalla, Arkhaule Jitpur, Basantatar, Belhara, Budhabare, Bhirgaun, Bodhe, Budhabare, Budi Morang, Chanuwa, Chhintang, Chungmang, Danda Bazar, Dandagaun, Hathikharka, Jitpur Arkhaule, Khoku, Khuwaphok, Kuruletenupa, Leguwa, Mahabharat, Marek Katahare, Maunabuthuk, Mudebas, Murtidhunga, Parewadin, Phaksib, Raja Rani, Tankhuwa, Telia, Vedatar

==== Morang District ====
Amaibariyati, Amardaha, Babiya Birta, Bahuni, Banigama, Baradanga, Bayarban, Bhaudaha, Budhanagar, Dainiya, Dangihat, Dangraha, Darbairiya, Drabesh, Govindapur, Hasandaha, Hathimudha, Hoklabari, Itahara, Jante, Jhapa Baijanathpur, Jhorahat, Jhurkiya, Kadamaha, Katahari, Kathamaha, Kerabari, Keroun, Lakhantari, Madhumalla, Mahadeva, Majhare, Matigachha, Motipur, Nocha, Patigaun, Pokhariya, Rajghat, Ramite Khola, Sidharaha, Sijuwa, Sinhadevi Sombare, Sisabanibadahara, Sisawanijahada, Sorabhaj, Tandi, Tankisinuwari, Tetariya, Thalaha, Warangi, Yangshila

==== Sankhuwasabha District ====
Ankhibhui, Bahrabise, Bala, Chepuwa, Dhupu, Diding, Hatiya, Jaljala, Kimathanka, Madi Mulkharka, Madi Rambeni, Makalu, Malta, Mamling, Manakamana, Mangtewa, Matsya Pokhari, Mawadin, Num, Nundhaki, Pangma, Pathibhara, Pawakhola, Savapokhari, Sisuwakhola, Sitalpati, Syabun, Tamaphok, Tamku, Yaphu

==== Sunsari District ====
Aekamba, Amaduwa, Amahibelaha, Aurabarni, Babiya, Bakalauri, Barahachhetra, Basantapur, Bharaul, Bhokraha, Bishnupaduka, Chadwela, Chhitaha, Chimdi, Dewanganj, Ghuski, Dumaraha, Gautampur, Hanshpokha, Harinagar, Haripur, Jalpapur, Kaptanganj, Khanar, Laukahi, Madheli, Madhesa, Madhuwan, Madhyeharsahi, Mahendranagar, Narshinhatappu, Pakali, Panchakanya, Paschim Kasuha, Prakashpur, Purbakushaha, Ramganj Belgachhi, Ramganj Senuwari, Ramnagar Bhutaha, Sahebganj, Santerjhora, Simariya, Sonapur, Sripurjabdi, Tanamuna

==== Terhathum District ====
Angdim, Basantapur, Chhate Dhunga, Chuhandanda, Dangpa, Hamarjung, Hawaku, Isibu, Jaljale, Khamlalung, Morahang, Okhare, Oyakjung, Panchakanya Pokhari, Phakchamara, Phulek, Pauthak, Sabla, Samdu, Sankranti Bazar, Simle, Solma, Sri Jung, Sudap, Sungnam, Thoklung

=== Sagarmatha Zone ===
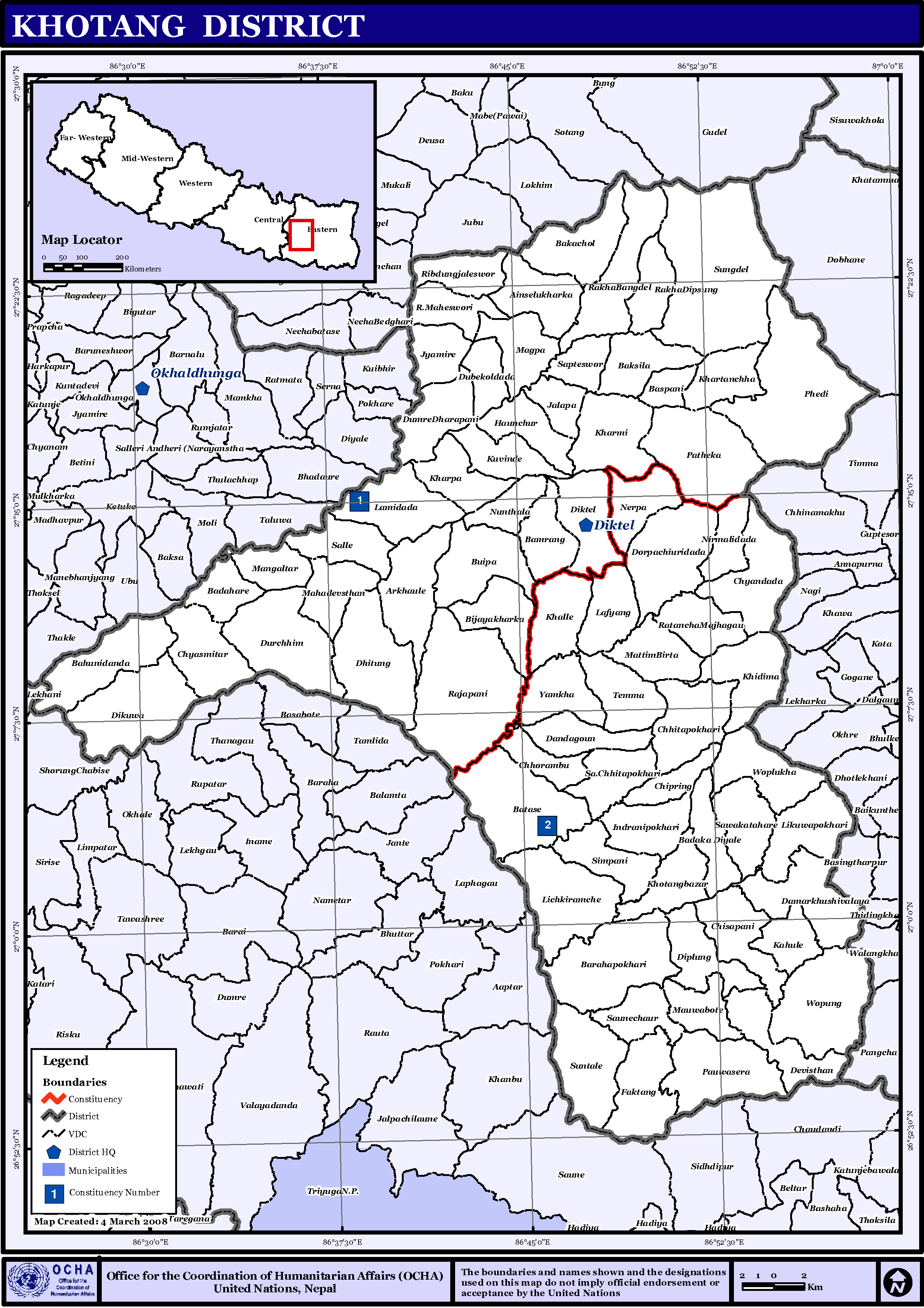
Khotang District

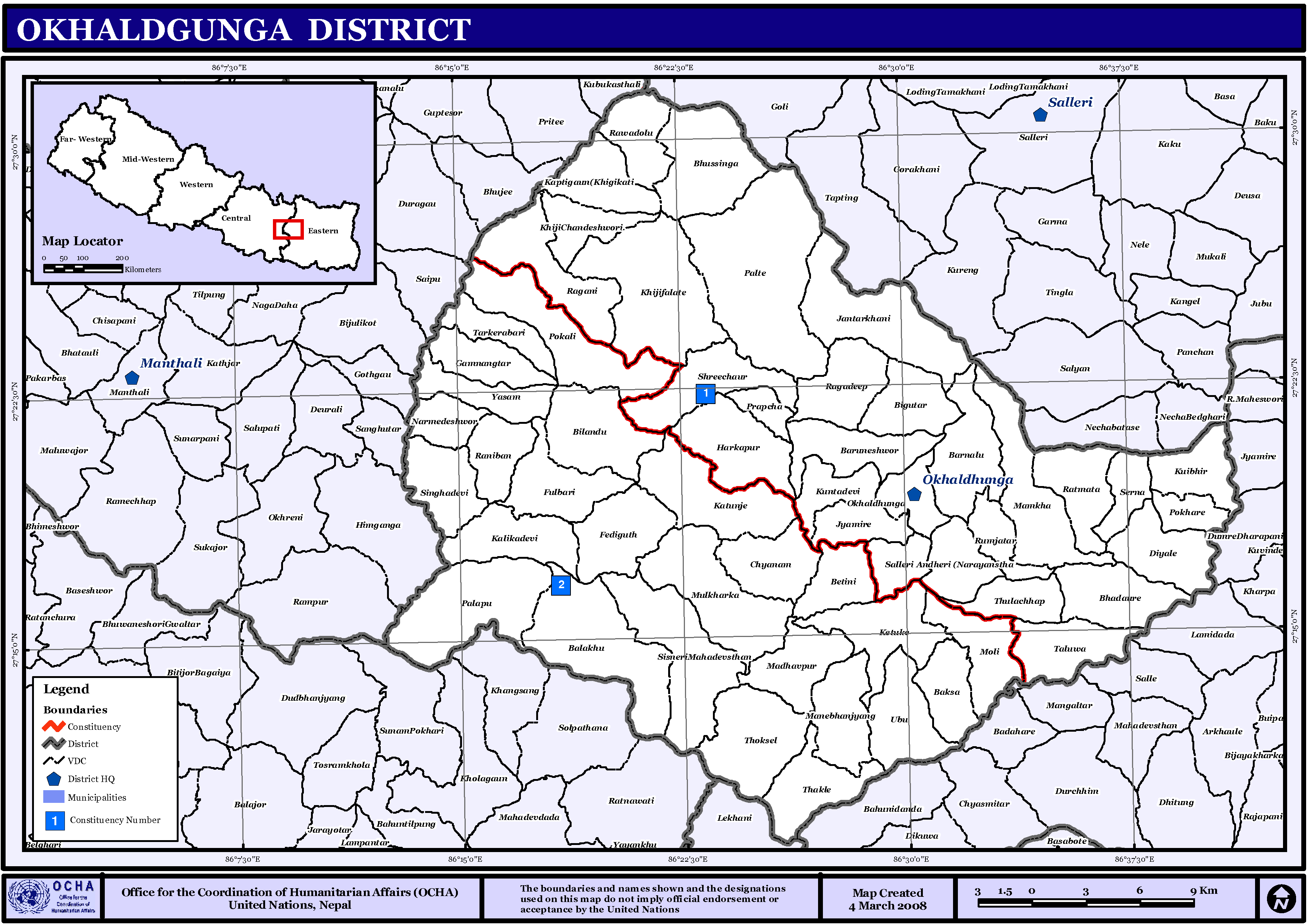
Okhaldhunga District

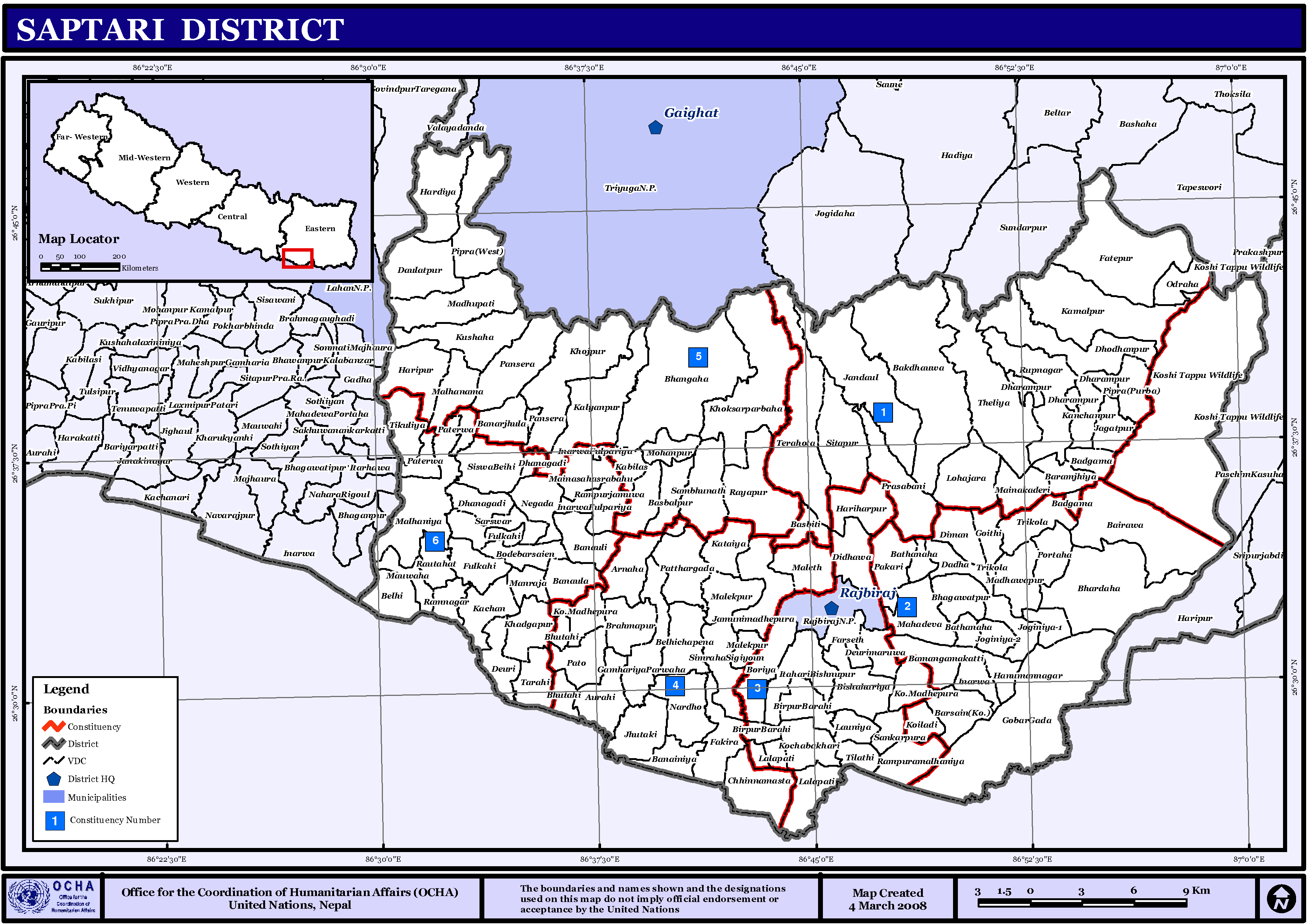
Saptari District

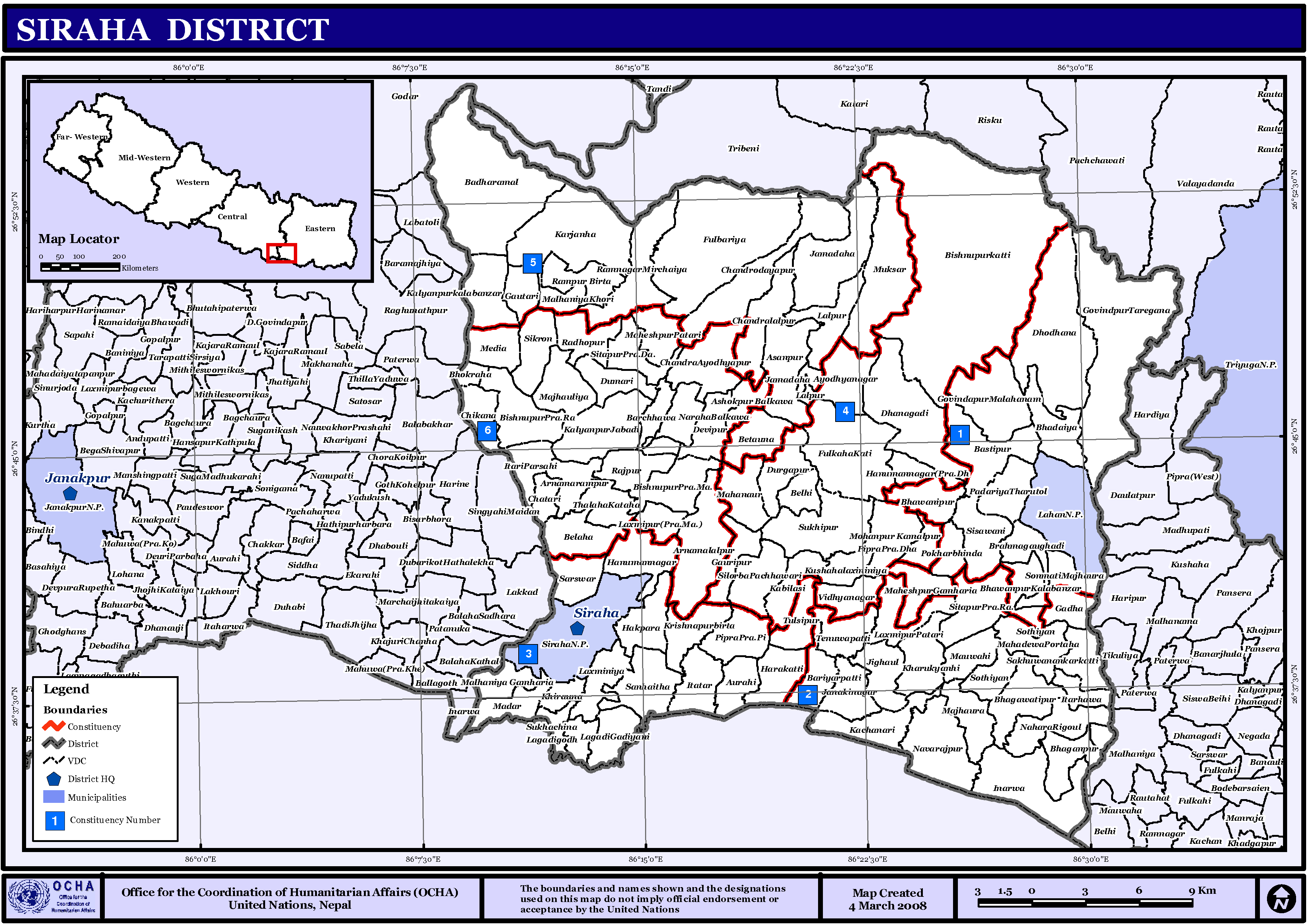
Siraha District

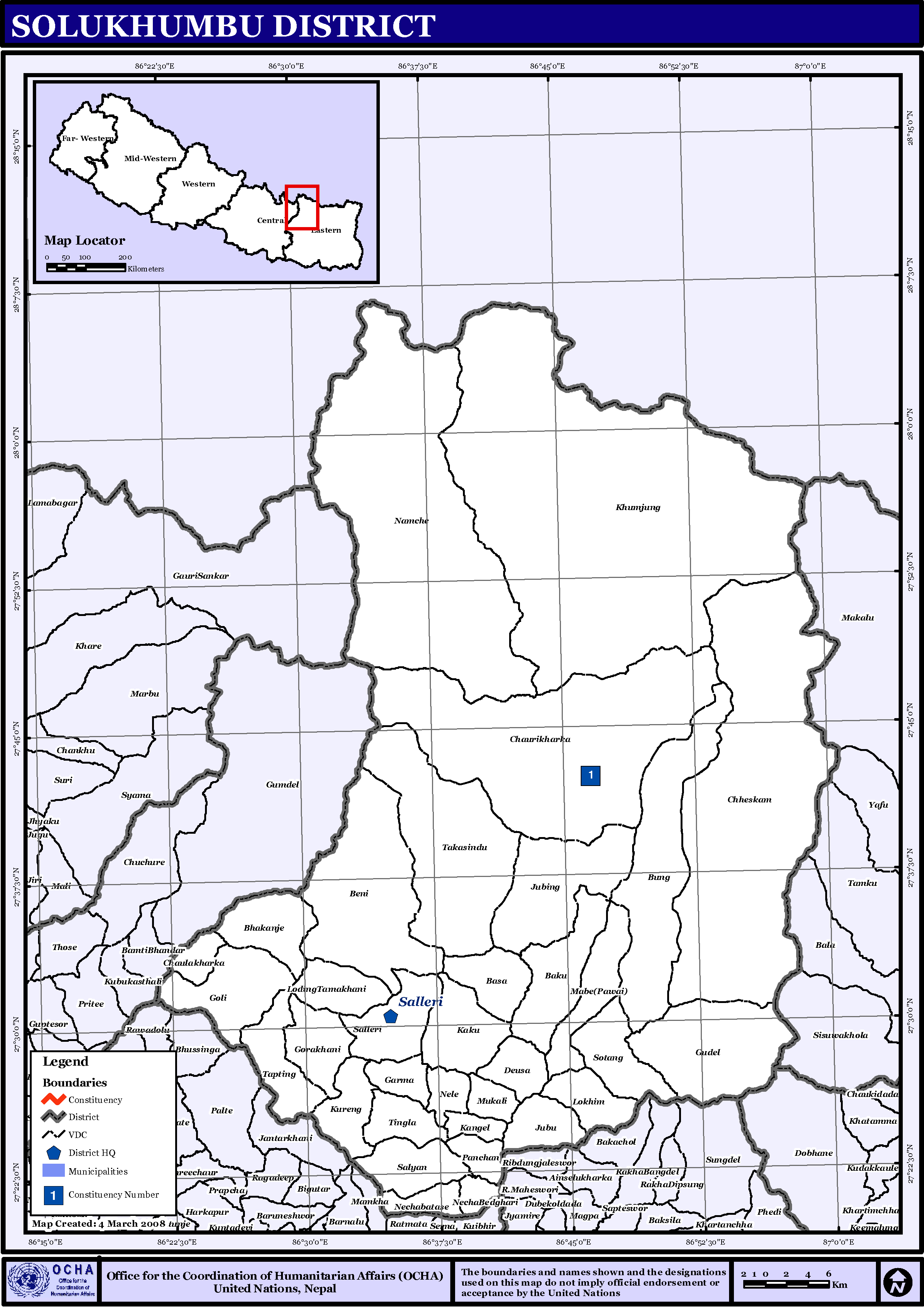
Solukhumbu District

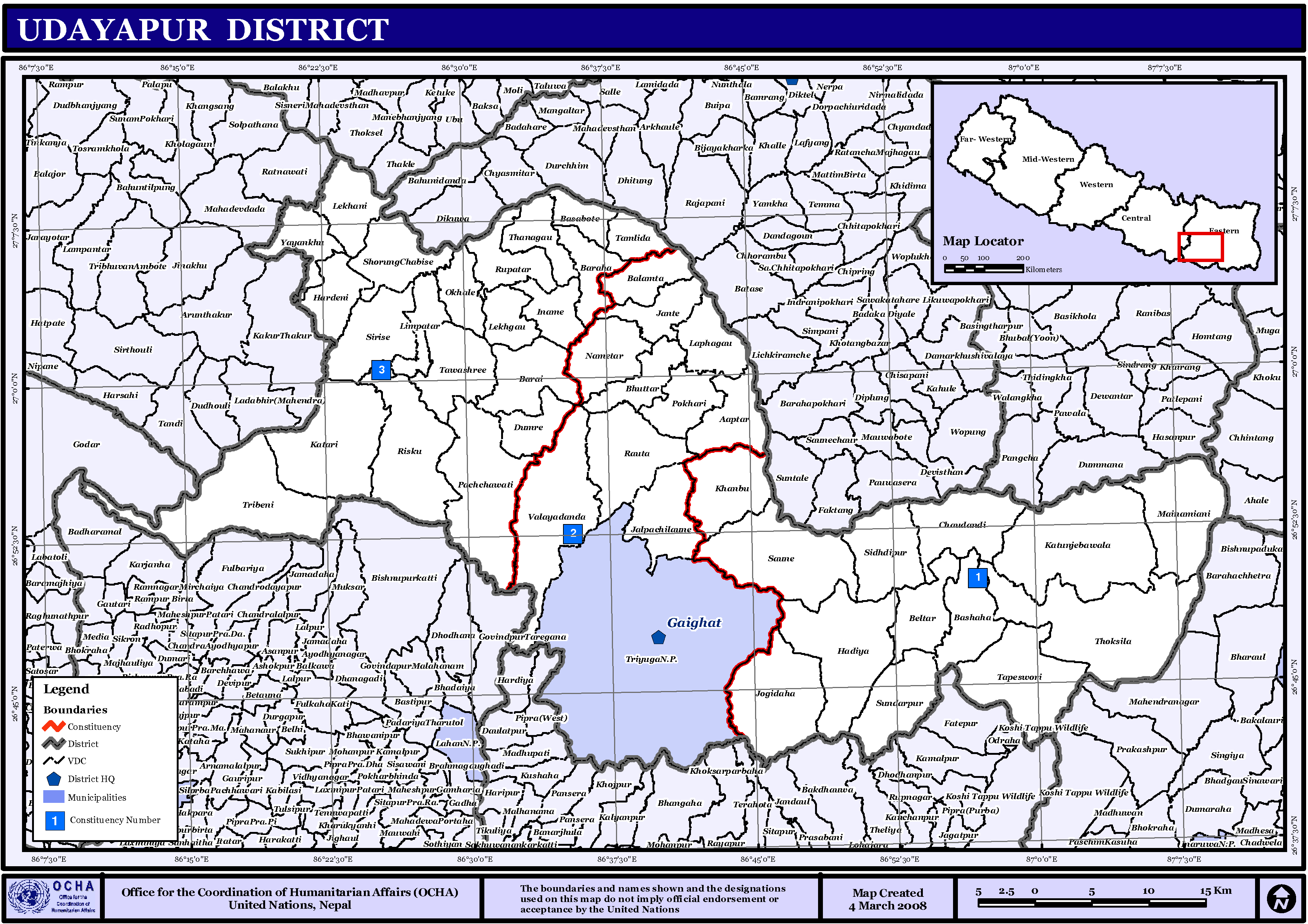
Udayapur District

==== Khotang District ====
Ainselu Kharka, Arkhale, Badahare, Badka Dipali, Bahunidanda, Bakachol, Baksila, Barahapokhari (VDC), Baspani, Batase, Bijaya Kharka, Buipa, Chhitapokhari, Chhorambu, Chipring, Chisapani, Chyandanda, Chyasmitar, Damarkhu Shivalaya, Dandagaun, Devisthan, Dharapani, Dhitung, Dikuwa, Diplung, Dipsung, Dorpa Chiuridanda, Dubekol, Dumre Dharapani, Durchhim, Hanchaur, Indrayani Pokhari, Jalapa, Jyamire, Kaule, Kharmi, Kharpa, Khartamchha, Khidima, Khotang Bazar, Kuvinde, Lamidanda, Lichki Ramche, Linkuwa Pokhari, Magpa, Mahadevasthan, Mangaltar, Mattim Birta, Mauwabote, Nerpa, Nirmalidanda, Nunthala, Patheka, Pauwasera, Phaktang, Phedi, Rajapani, Rakha Bangdel, Rakha Dipsung, Ratancha Majhagaun, Ribdung Jaleshwari, Ribdung Maheshwari, Salle, Santeshwar Chhitapokhari, Sapteshwar, Saunechaur, Sawakatahare, Simpani, Sungdel, Suntale, Woplukha, Wopung, Yamkhya

==== Okhaldhunga District ====
Baksa, Balakhu, Baraneshwar, Betini, Bhadaure, Bhussinga, Bigutar, Bilandu, Chyanam, Diyale, Gamnangtar, Harkapur, Jantarkhani, Kalikadevi, Kaptigaun, Katunje, Ketuke, Khiji Chandeshwari, Khijiphalate, Kuibhir, Kuntadevi, Madhavpur, Mamkha, Manebhanjyang, Moli, Mulkharka, Narmedeshwar, Okhaldhunga, Palapu, Patle, Phediguth, Phulbari, Pokhare, Pokli, Prapchan, Ragani, Rajadip, Raniban, Ratmata, Rawadolu, Serna, Srichaur, Singhadevi, Sisneri, Taluwa, Tarkerabari, Thakle, Thoksela, Thulachhap, Ubu, Vadaure, Yasam

==== Saptari District ====
Arnaha, Aurahi, Bainiya, Bairawa, Bakdhauwa, Bamangamakatti, Banarjhula, Banaula, Banauli, Barhmapur, Barsain, Basbiti, Bathnaha, Belhi, Belhi Chapena, Bhagawatpur, Bhardaha, Bhutahi, Birpur Barahi, Bishariya, Budebarsaien, Boriya, Brahmapur, Chhinnamasta, Dauda, Daulatpur, Deuri, Deurimaruwa, Dhanagadi, Didhawa, Diman, Gamhariya Parwaha, Goithi, Hardiya, Hariharpur, Haripur, Inarwa Phulbariya, Itahari Bishnupur, Jamuni Madhapura, Jandaul, Jhutaki, Kabilash, Kachan, Kalyanpur, Kataiya, Khadgapur, Khojpur, Ko. Madhepura, Kochabakhari, Koiladi, Kushaha, Lalapati, Launiya, Lohajara, Madhawapur, Madhupati, Mahadeva, Maina Kaderi, Maina Sahasrabahu, Malekpur, Maleth, Malhanama, Malhaniya, Manraja, Mauwaha, Nargho, Negada, Pakari, Pansera, Parasbani, Paterwa, Pato, Patthargada, Phakira, Pharseth, Phulkahi, Pipra (West), Portaha, Ramnagar, Rampur Malhaniya, Rautahat, Rayapur, Sankarpura, Sarashwar, Simraha Sigiyaun, Siswa Beihi, Sitapur, Tarahi, Terahota, Tikuliya, Tilathi, Trikola

==== Siraha District ====
Arnama Lalpur, Arnama Rampur, Aurahi, Badharamal, Barchhawa, Bariyarpatti, Basbita, Bastipur, Belaha, Bhadaiya, Bhagawanpur, Bhagawatipur, Bhawanpur Kalabanchar, Bhokraha, Bishnupur Pra. Ma., Bishnupur Pra. Ra., Brahmagaughadi, Chandra Ayodhyapur, Chatari, Chikana, Devipur, Dhodhana, Dumari, Durgapur, Gadha, Gauripur, Gautari, Govindapur Malahanama, Govindpur Taregana, Hakpara, Hanuman Nagar, Harakathi, Inarwa, Itarhawa, Itari Parsahi, Itatar, Janakinagar, Jighaul, Kabilasi, Kachanari, Kalyanpur Jabadi, Kalyanpur Kalabanchar, Karjanha, Kharukyanhi, Khirauna, Krishnapur Birta, Lagadi Gadiyani, Lagadigoth, Lakshminiya, Lakshmipur (Pra. Ma.), Lakshmipur Patari, Madar, Mahadewa Portaha, Mahanaur, Maheshpur Patari, Majhauliya, Majhaura, Makhanaha, Malhaniya Gamharia, Mauwahi, Media, Nahara Rigaul, Naraha Balkawa, Navarajpur, Padariya Tharutol, Pipra Pra. Dha., Pipra Pra. Pi, Pokharbhinda, Rajpur, Sakhuwanankarkatti, Sanhaitha, Sarashwar, Sikron, Sisawani, Sonmati Majhaura, Sothayan, Sukhachina, Tenuwapati, Thalaha Kataha, Thegahi, Tulsipur

==== Solukhumbu District ====
Baku, Bapha, Basa, Beni, Bhakanje, Bung, Chaulakharka, Chaurikharka, Chheskam, Deusa, Goli, Gorakhani, Gudel, Jubing, Jubu, Kaku, Kangel, Kerung, Khumjung, Lokhim, Mabe, Mukali, Namche, Necha Batase, Necha Bedghari, Nele, Panchan, Salyan, Sautang, Takasindu, Tapting, Tingla

==== Udayapur District ====
Aaptar, Balamta, Baraha, Barai, Basabote, Bhumarashuwa, Bhuttar, Chaudandi, Dumre, Hadiya, Hardeni, Iname, Jalpachilaune, Janti, Jogidaha, Katunjebawala, Khanbu, Laphagaun, Lekhani, Lekhgau, Limpatar, Mainamiani, Myakhu, Nametar, Okhale, Panchawati, Pokhari, Rauta, Risku, Rupatar, Saune, Shorung Chabise, Sirise, Sithdipur, Sundarpur, Tamlichha, Triyuga, Tapeshwari, Tawasri, Thanagaun, Thoksila, Valaya Danda, Yayankhu

== Central Development Region ==
=== Janakpur Zone ===
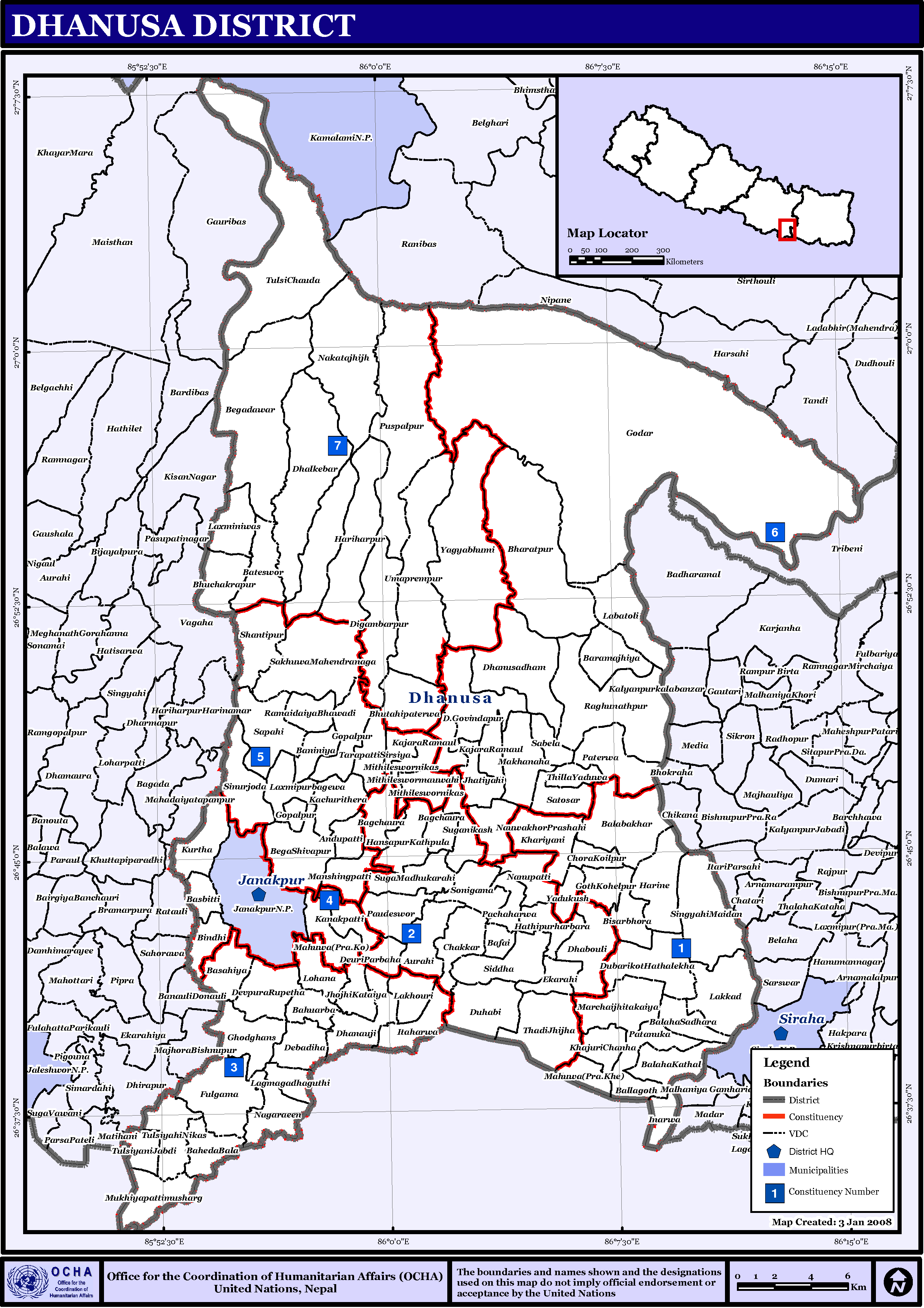
Dhanusa District

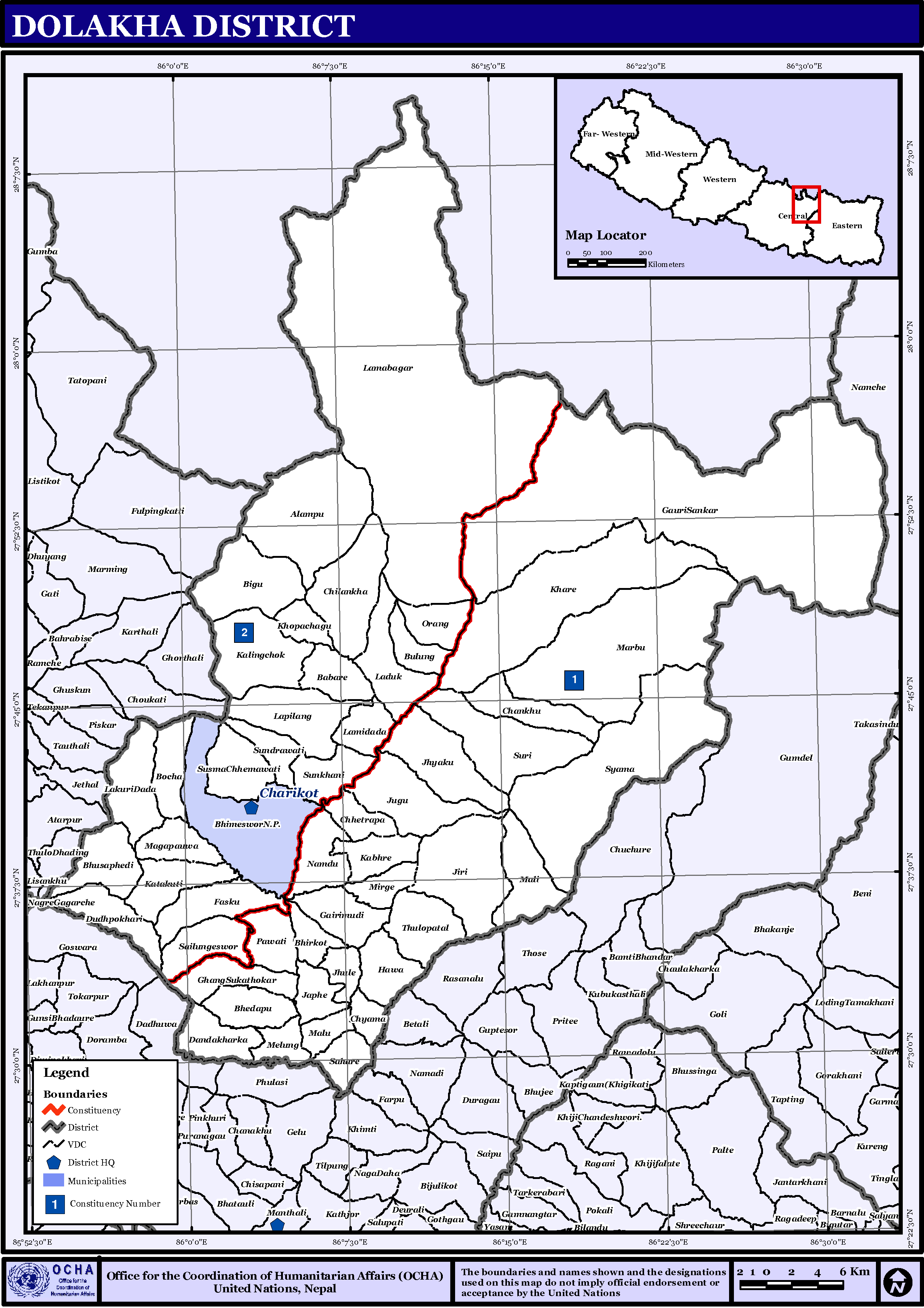
Dolakha District

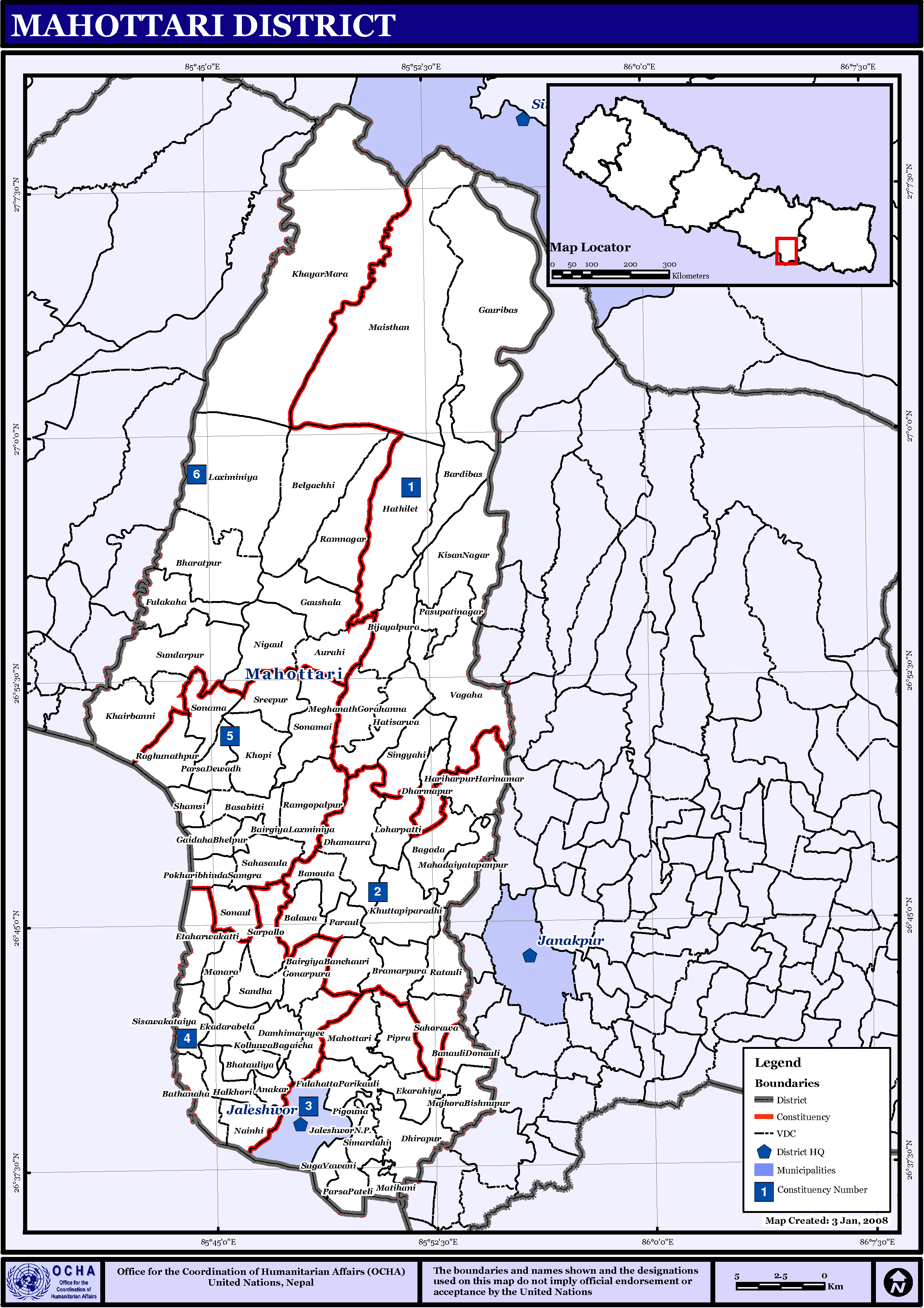
Mahottari District

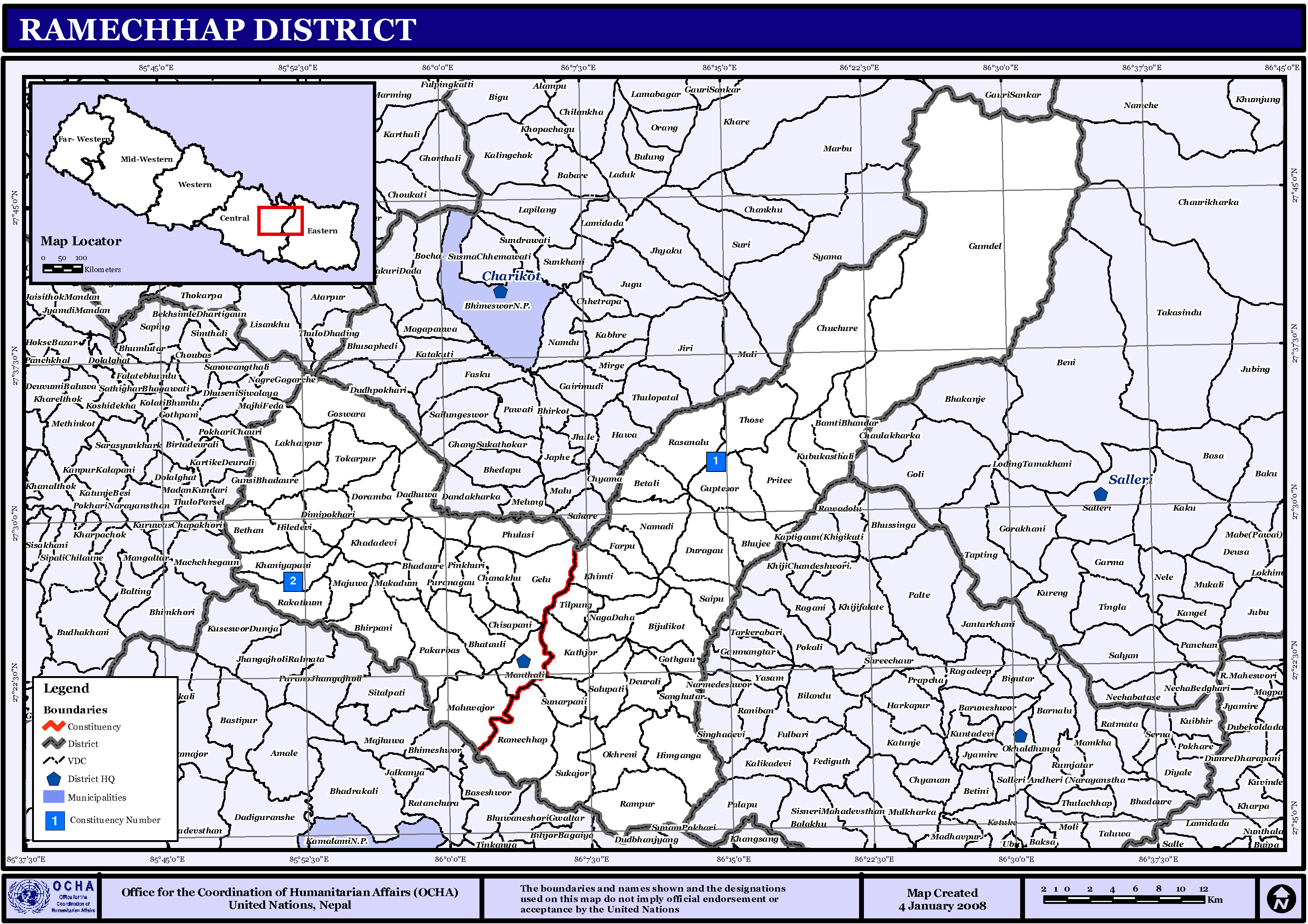
Ramechhap District

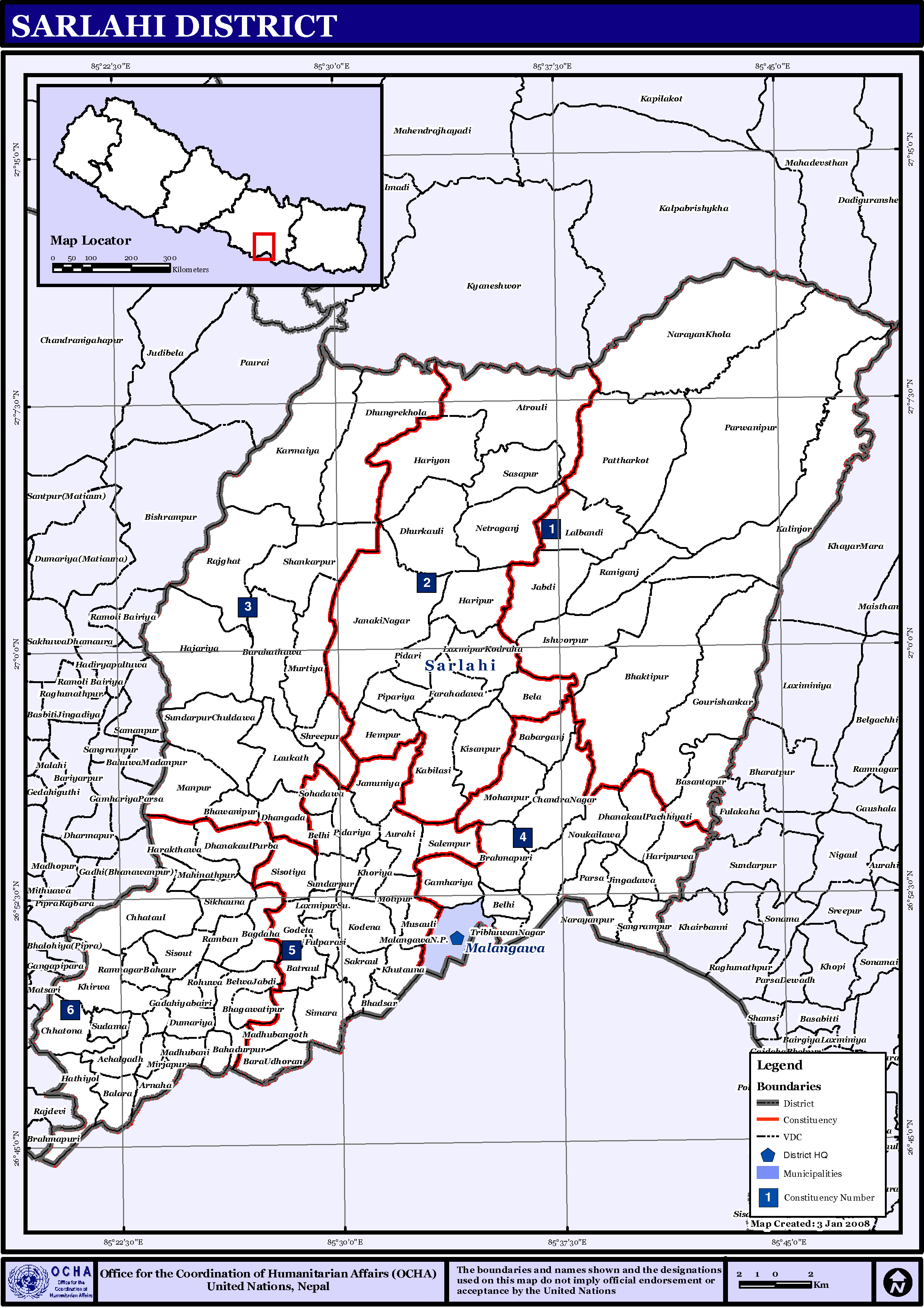
Sarlahi District

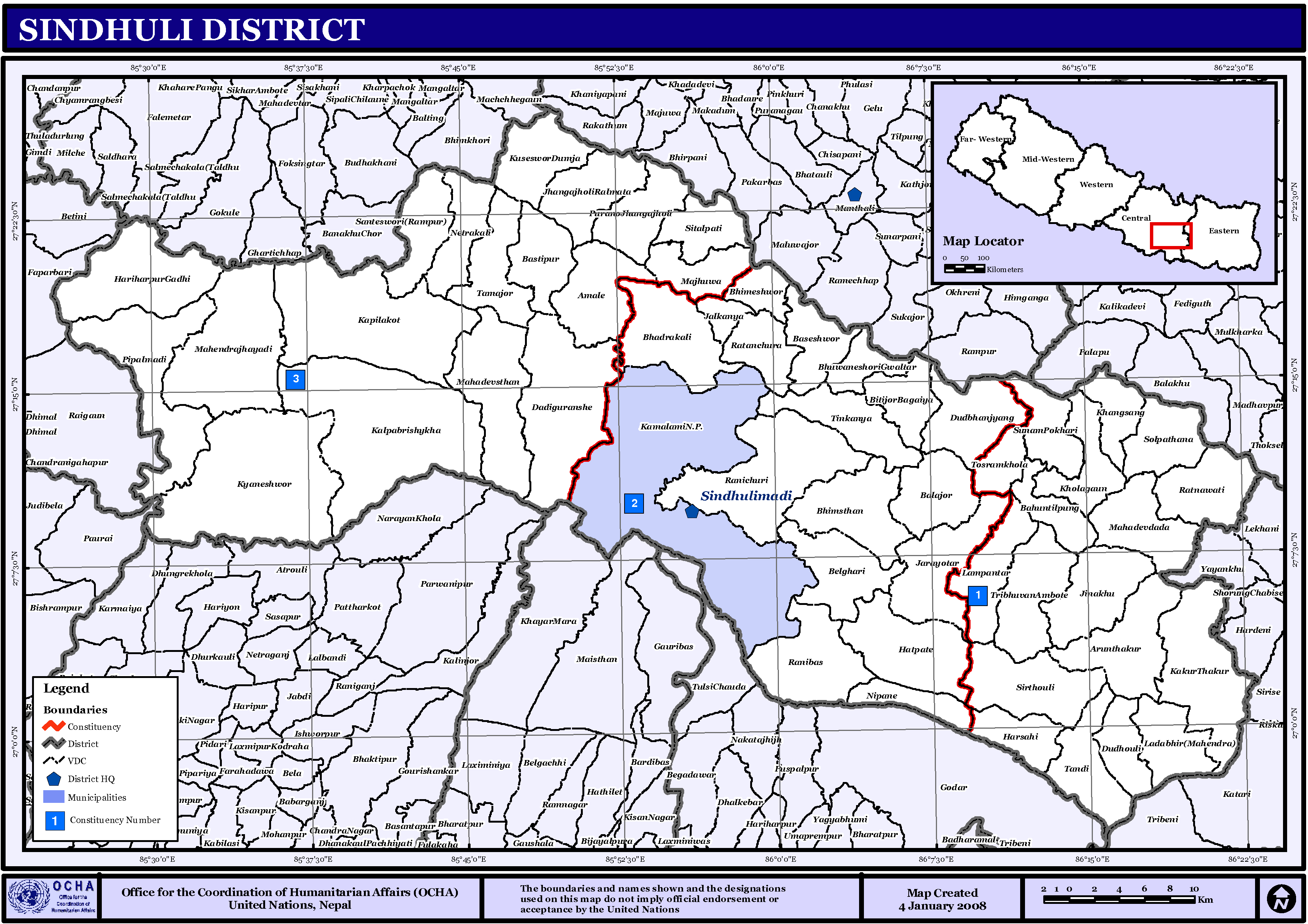
Sindhuli District

==== Dhanusa District ====
Andupatti, Aurahi, Baphai, Bagchaura, Baheda Bala, Bahuarba, Bhatauliya, Balabakhar, Balaha Kathal, Balaha Sadhara, Ballagoth, Baniniya, Basahiya, Basbitti, Bateshwar, Bega Shivapur, Begadawar, Bhuchakrapur, Bhutahi Paterwa, Bindhi, Bisarbhora, Chakkar, Chora Koilpur, Debadiha, Deuri Parbaha, Devpura Rupetha, Dhabauli, Dhanauji, Dubarikot Hathalekha, Duhabi, Ekarahi, Ghodghans, Giddha, Gopalpur, Goth Kohelpur, Hansapur Kathpula, Harine, Hathipur Harbara, Inarwa, Itaharwa, Jhatiyahi, Jhojhi Kataiya, Kachuri Thera, Kajara Ramaul, Kanakpatti, Khajuri Chanha, Khariyani, Kurtha, Lagmamdha Guthi, Lakhauri, Lakkad, Lakshminibas, Lakshmipur Bagewa, Lohana Bahbangama, Machijhitakaiya, Mahuwa (Pra. Ko), Mahuwa (Pra. Khe), Mansingpatti, Mithileshwar Nikash, Mithileshwar Mauwahi, Mukhiyapatti Mushargiya, Nagarain, Nauwakhor Prashahi, Nunpatti, Pachaharwa, Papikleshwar, Patanuka, Paterwa, Paudeshwar, Phulgama, Pushpawlpur, Raghunathpur, Rampur Birta, Sapahi, Shantipur, Siddha, Singyahi Maidan, Sinurjoda, Sonigama, Suga Madhukarahi, Suganikash, Tarapatti Sirsiya, Thadi Jhijha, Tulsi Chauda, Tulsiyahi Nikas, Tulsiyani Jabdi, Yadukuha

==== Dolakha District ====
Alampu, Babare, Bhedapu, Bhirkot, Bhusapheda, Bigu, Bocha, Bulung, Chankhu, Chhetrapa, Chilankha, Chyama, Dadhpokhari, Dandakharka, Gairimudi, Gaurishankar, Ghang Sukathokar, Hawa, Japhe, Jhule, Jhyaku, Jugu, Kabhre, Kalingchok, Katakuti, Khare, Khupachagu, Laduk, Lakuri Danda, Lamabagar, Lamidanda, Lapilang, Magapauwa, Makaibari, Malu, Marbu, Mati, Melung, Mirge, Namdu, Orang, Pawati, Phasku, Sahare, Shailungeshwar, Sunakhani, Sundrawati, Sureti, Susma Chhemawati, Syama

==== Mahottari District ====
Anakar, Aurahi, Bagada, Bagiya Banchauri, Bairjiya Lakshminiya, Balawa, Banauli Donauli, Banauta, Basabitti, Bathnaha, Belgachhi, Bharatpur, Bhatauliya, Bijayalpura, Bramarpura, Damhi Marai, Dhamaura, Dharmapur, Dhirapur, Ekadarabela, Ekarahiya, Etaharwakatti, Gaidaha Bhelpur, Gonarpura, Halkhori, Hariharpur Harinagari, Hathilet, Hatisarwa, Khairbanni, Khakhana, Khaya Mara, Khopi, Khuttapipradhi, Kolhusa Bagaiya, Lakshminiya, Loharpatti, Mahadaiyatapanpur, Majhora Bishnupur, Manara, Matihani, Meghanath Gorhanna, Nainhi, Padaul, Parsa Pateli, Parsadewadh, Pashupatinagar, Phulahatta Parikauli, Phulakaha, Pigauna, Pipra, Pokharibhinda Samgrampur, Raghunathpur, Ramgopalpur, Ratauli, Sahasaula, Sahorawa, Samdha, Sarpallo, Shamsi, Sripur, Simardahi, Singyahi, Sisawakataiya, Sonama, Sonamar, Sonaum, Suga Bhawani, Sundarpur, Vangaha Prariya

==== Ramechhap District ====
Bamti Bhandar, Betali, Bethan, Bhadaure, Bhirpani, Bhuji, Bijulikot, Chanakhu, Chuchure, Dadhuwa, Daragaun, Deurali, Dhyaurali, Dimipokhari, Doramba, Duragau, Gelu, Goshwara, Gothgau, Gumdel, Gunsi Bhadaure, Gupteshwar, Hiledevi, Himganga, Khandadevi, Khaniyapani, Khimti, Kubukasthali, Lakhanpur, Majuwa, Makadum, Naga Daha, Namadi, Pakarbas, Pharpu, Phulasi, Piukhuri, Priti, Puranagau, Rakathum, Rampur, Rasanalu, Saipu, Sanghutar, Those, Tilpung, Tokarpur, Wapti

==== Sarlahi District ====
Achalgadh, Arnaha, Aurahi, Babarganj, Bagdaha, Bahadurpur, Balara, Bara Udhoran, Basantapur, Batraul, Bela, Belhi, Belwajabdi, Bhadsar, Bhagawatipur, Bhawanipur, Brahmapuri, Chandra Nagar, Chhataul, Chhatona, Dhana Palbhawari, Dhanakaul Purba, Dhangada, Dumariya, Gadahiyabairi, Gamhariya, Godeta, Gaurishankar, Harakthawa, Haripur, Haripurwa, Hathiyol, Hempur, Jamuniya, Janaki Nagar, Jingadawa, Kabilasi, Kalinjor, Khaiharwa, Khoriya, Kisanpur, Kodena, Lakshmipur Kodraha, Lakshmipur Su., Madhubangoth, Madhubani, Mahinathpur, Mailhi, Manpur, Masaili, Mirjapur, Mohanpur, Motipur, Musauli, Narayan Khola, Narayanpur, Netraganj, Naukailawa, Parsa, Parwanipur, Pharahadawa, Phulparasi, Pidari, Pidariya, Pipariya, Ramnagar Bahaur, Ranban, Raniganj, Rohuwa, Sakraula, Salempur, Sangrampur, Shahorwa, Shreepur, Sikhauna, Simara, Sisautiya, Sisaut, Shankarpur, Sohadawa, Sudama, Sundarpur, Sundarpur Choharwa, Tribhuwannagar

==== Sindhuli District ====
Amale, Arun Thakur, Bahuntilpung, Balajor, Baseshwar, Bastipur, Belghari, Bhadrakali, Bhiman, Bimeshwar, Bhimsthan, Bhuwaneshwar Gwaltar, Bitijor Bagaincha, Dadiguranshe, Dudbhanjyang, Hariharpur Gadhi, Harsahi, Hatpate, Jalkanya, Jarayotar, Jhangajholi Ratmati, Jinakhu, Kakur Thakur, Kalpabriksha, Kapilakot, Khang Sang, Kholagaun, Kusheshwar Dumja, Kyaneshwar, Ladabhir, Lampantar, Mahadevdada, Mahadevsthan, Mahendrajhayadi, Majuwa, Netrakali, Nipane, Pipalmadi, Purano Jhangajholi, Ranibas, Ranichuri, Ratnachura, Ratnawati, Shanteshwari, Siddheshwar, Sirthauli, Sitalpati, Solpathana, Sunam Pokhari, Tamajor, Tandi, Tinkanya, Tosramkhola, Tribhuvan Ambote

=== Bagmati Zone ===
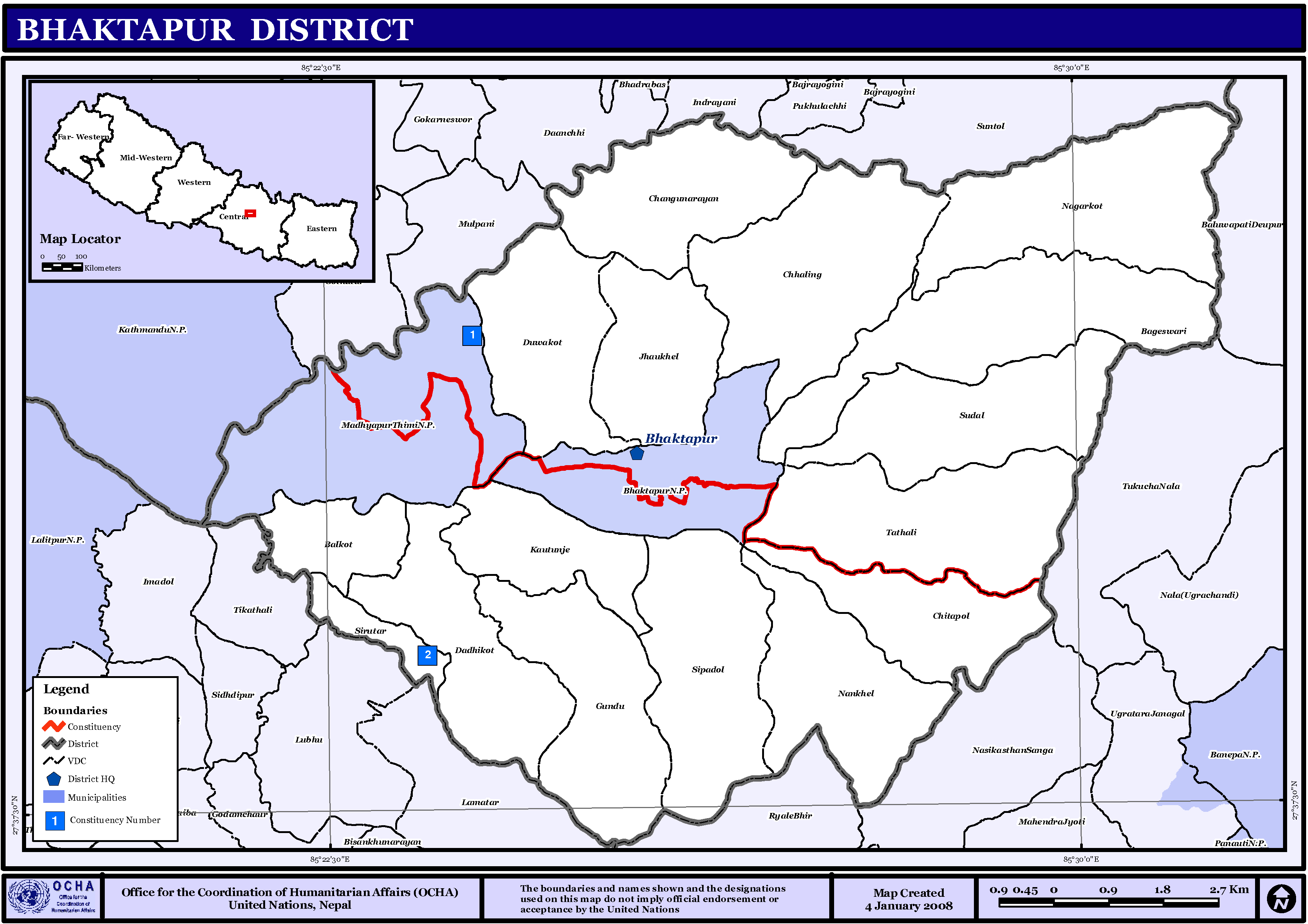
Bhaktapur District

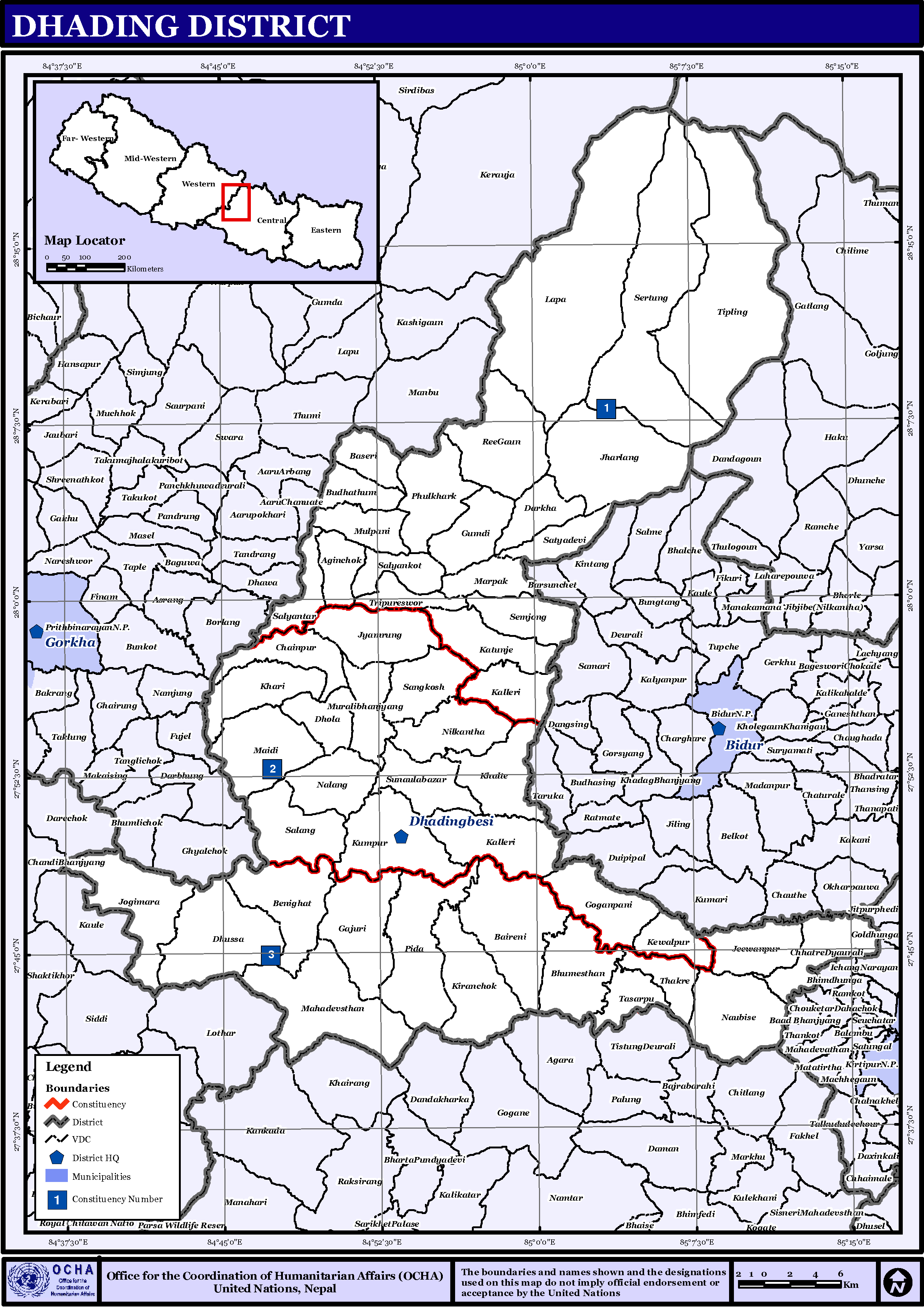
Dhading District

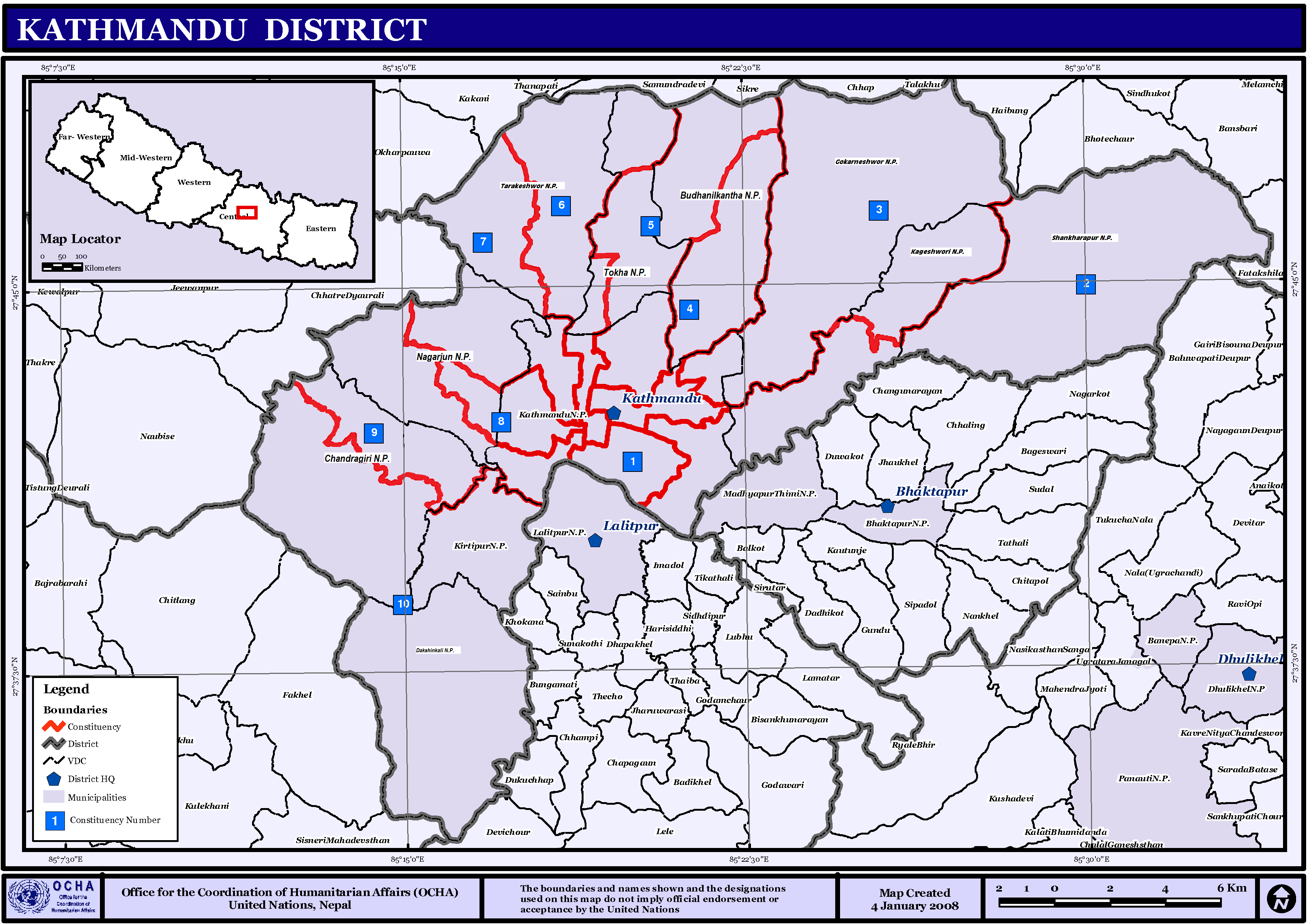
Kathmandu District

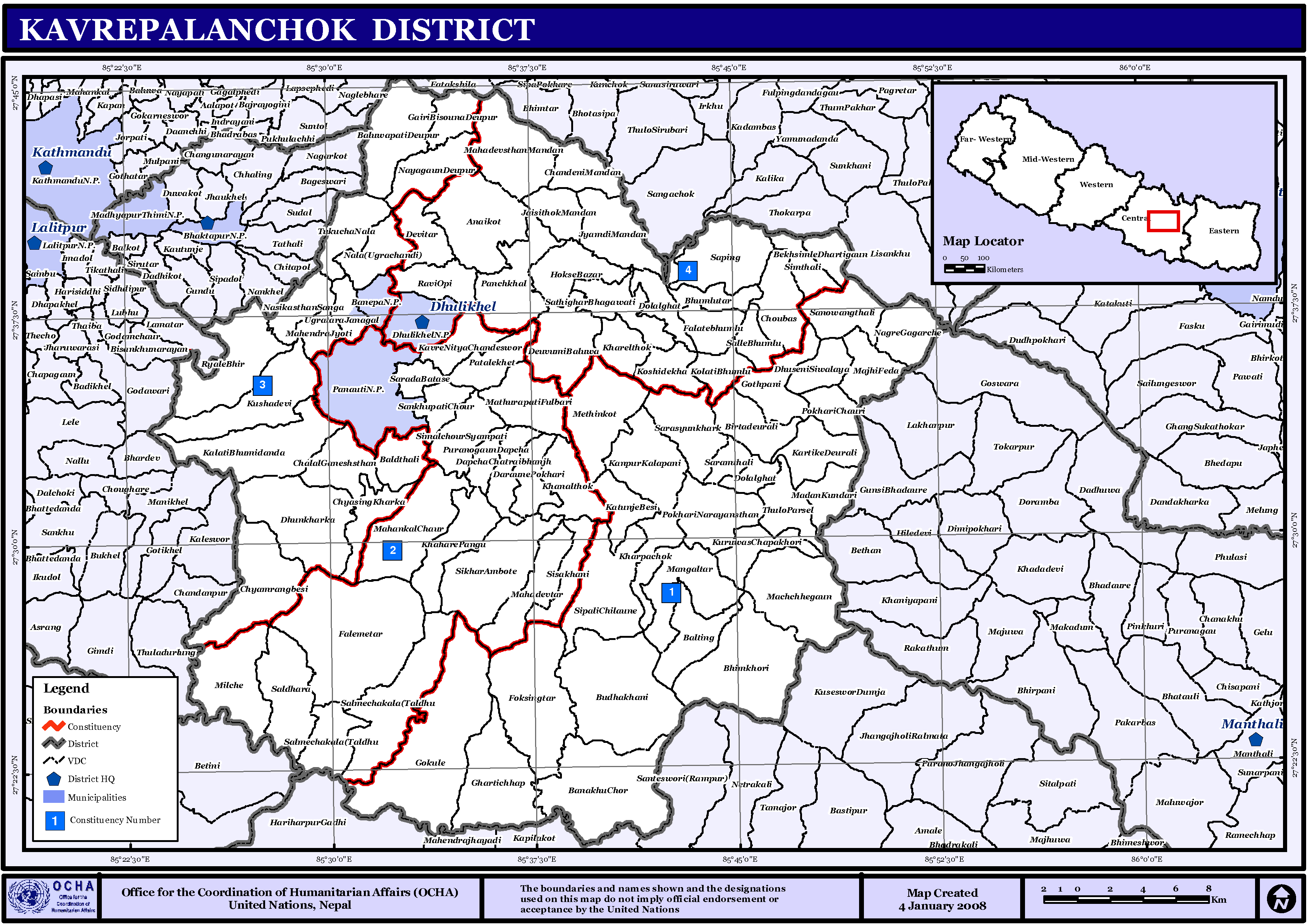
Kabhrepalanchok District

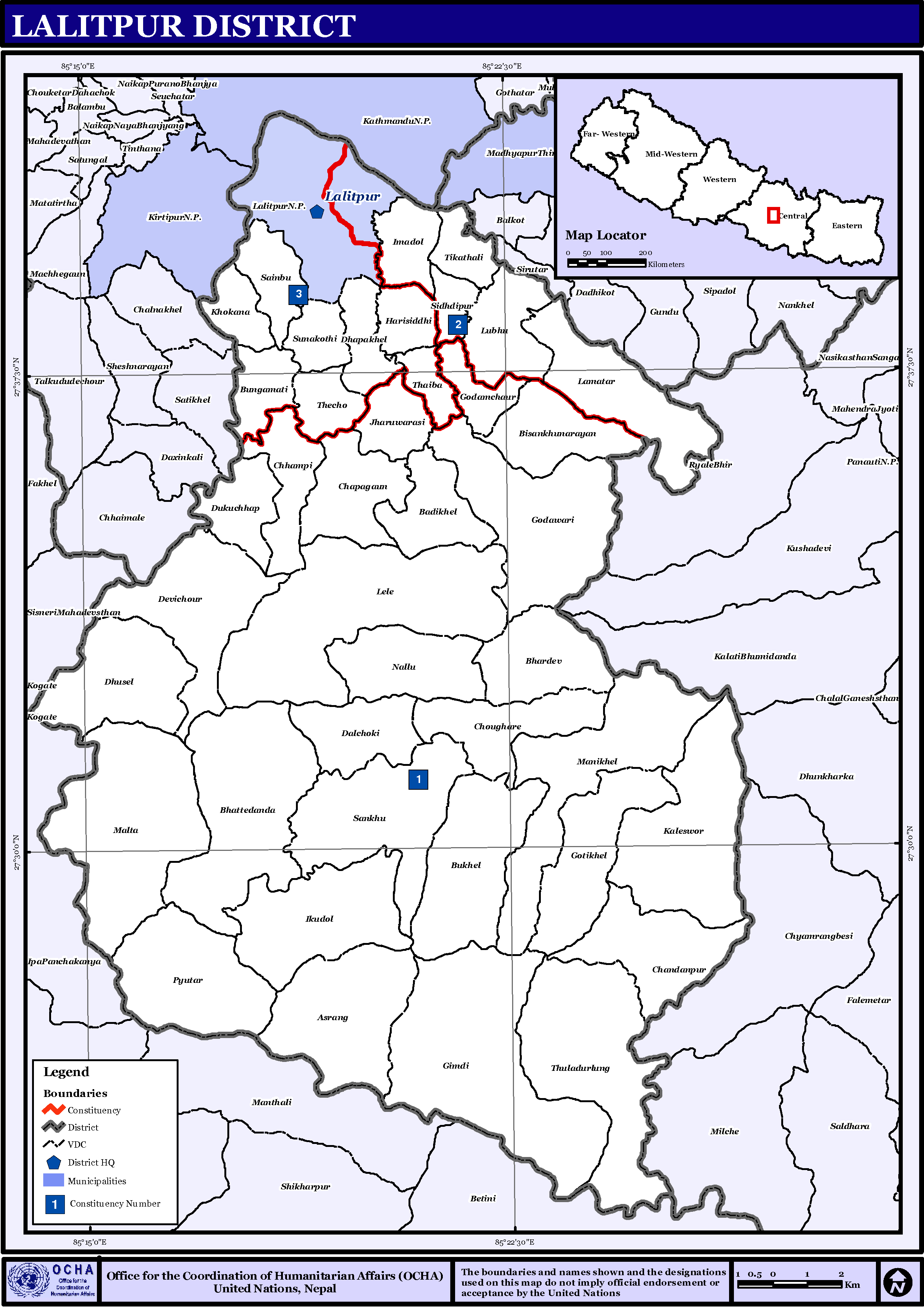
Lalitpur District

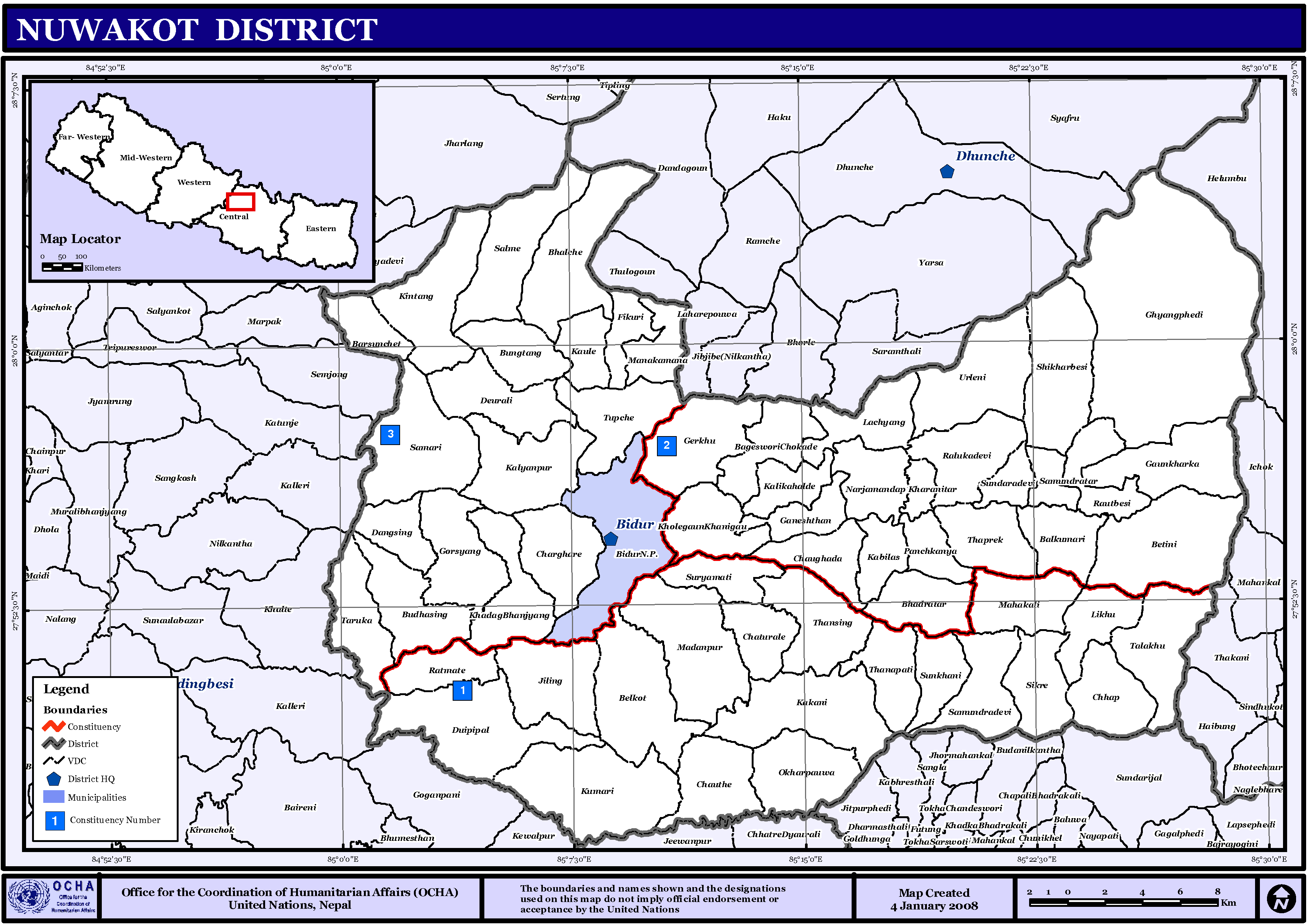
Nuwakot District

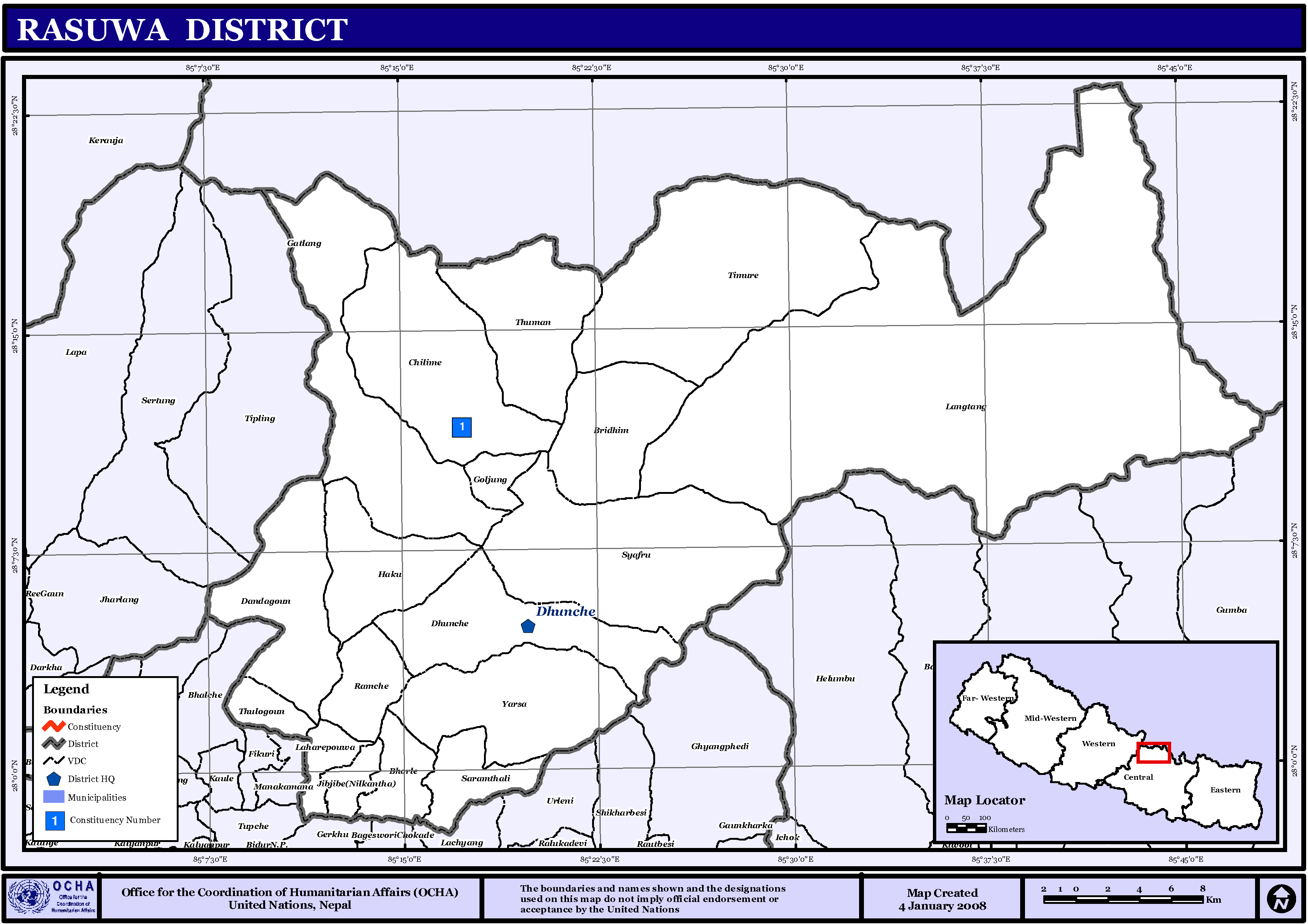
Rasuwa District

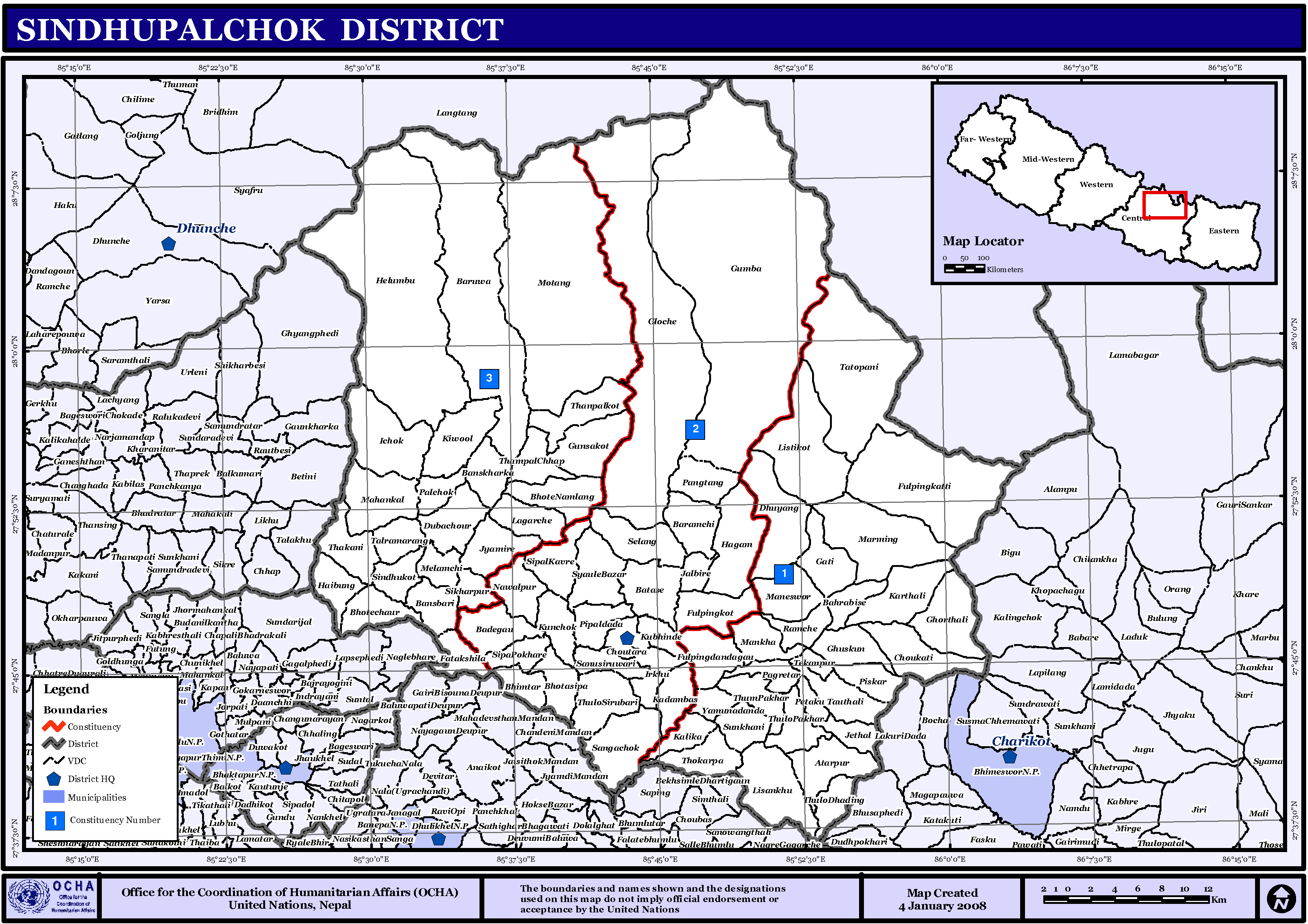
Sindhulpalchok District

==== Bhaktapur District ====
Bageshwari, Balkot, Balkumari, Bode, Changunarayan, Chapacho, Chhaling, Chittpol, Dadhikot, Duwakot, Gundu, Jhaukhel, Katunje, Lokanthali, Nagadesh, Nagarkot, Nankhel, Sipadol, Sirutar, Sudal, Tathali

==== Dhading District ====
Aginchok, Baireni, Baseri, Benighat, Bhumesthan, Budhathum, Chainpur, Chhatre Dyaurali, Darkha, Dhola, Dhusha, Dhuwakot, Gajuri, Ghussa, Goganpani, Gumdi, Jiwanpur, Jharlang, Jogimara, Jyamaruk, Kalleri, Katunje, Kebalpur, Khalte, Khari, Kiranchok, Kumpur, Lapa, Mahadevsthan, Maidi, Marpak, Mulpani, Nalang, Naubise, Phulkharka, Pida, Rigaun, Salang, Salyankot, Salyantar, Satyadevi, Semjong, Sirtung, Tasarphu, Thakre, Tipling, Tripureshwar

==== Kathmandu District ====
Aalapot, Band Bhanjyang, Bajrayogini, Balambu, Baluwa, Bhadrabas, Bhimdhunga, Budanilkantha, Chalnakhel, Chapali Bhadrakali, Chhaimale, Chobhar, Nepal, Chauketar Dahachok, Chunikhel, Daanchhi, Dakshinkali, Dhapasi, Dharmasthali, Gapalphedi, Gokarna, Goldhunga, Gongabu, Gothatar, Ichankhu Narayan, Indrayani, Jhor Mahankal, Jitpurphedi, Jorpati, Kabhresthali, Kapan, Khadka Bhadrakali, Kirtipur Chitubihar, Koteshwar, Lapsiphedi, Machhegaun, Mahadevsthan, Mahankal, Manmaiju, Matatirtha, Mulpani, Nanglebhare, Naikap Naya Bhanjyang, Naikap Purano Bhanjyang, Nayapati, Phutung, Pukhulachhi, Ramkot, Sangla, Satungal, Syuchatar, Sheshnarayan, Sitapaila, Sokhek, Sundarijal, Suntol, Talkududechaur, Thankot, Tinthana, Tokha Chandeshwari, Tokha Saraswati

==== Kavrepalanchok District ====
Anekot, Balthali, Walting, Baluwapatti Deupur, Banakhu Chaur, Batase, Bekhsimle, Bhimkhori, Bhumidanda, Bhumlungtar, Birtadeurali, Bolde Phediche, Budhakhani, Chalal Ganeshsthan, Chandeni Mandan, Chaubas, Chyamrangbesi, Chyasing Kharka, Dandagaun, Dewabhumi Baluwa, Devitar, Dhungkharka Bahrabise, Dhuseni Siwalaya, Dolalghat, Gairi Bisauna Deupur, Ghartichhap, Gokule, Gothpani, Indreshwar, Jaisithok Mandan, Janagal, Jyamdi Mandan, Kalati Bhumidanda, Kanpur Kalapani, Kartike Deurali, Katunje Besi, Kabhre Nitya Chandeshwari, Khahare Pangu, Kharelthok, Kharpachok, Khopasi, Kolati Bhumlu, Koshidekha, Kurubas Chapakhori, Kushadevi, Machchhegaun, Madan Kundari, Mahadevsthan Mandan, Mahadevtar, Mahankal Chaur, Mahendra Jyoti, Majhi Pheda, Malpi, Mangaltar, Milche, Nagre Gagarche, Nala, Nasiksthan Sanga, Nayagaun Deupur, Phalante Bhumlu, Phalametar, Phoksingtar, Pokhari Chaunri, Pokhari Narayansthan, Ravi Opi, Rayale, Saldhara, Salle Bhumlu, Salmechakala, Sankhu Patichaur, Sanowangthali, Saping, Sharada Batase, Sarmathali, Sarasyunkharka, Sathighar Bhagawati, Shikar Ambote, Simalchaur Shyampati, Simthali, Sipali Chilaune, Subbagaun, Sunthan, Thaukhal, Thulo Parsal, Tukucha Nala, Ugratara Janagal

==== Lalitpur District ====
Ashrang, Bhardev, Bhattedanda, Bukhel, Chandanpur, Chaughare, Dalchoki, Devichaur, Ghusel, Durlung, Gimdi, Gotikhel, Ikudol, Kaleshwar, Malta, Manikhel, Nallu, Pyutar, Sankhu, Thuladurlung, Badikhel, Bisankhunarayan, Bungamati, Chhampi, Chapagaon, Dhapakhel, Dukuchhap, Godamchaur, Godawari, Harisiddhi, Imadol, Jharuwarasi, Khokana, Lamatar, Lele, Lubhu, Sainbu, Siddhipur, Sunakothi, Thecho, Thaiba, Tikathali, Chapa Gaon, Satdobato

==== Nuwakot District ====
Bageshwari, Balkumari, Barsunchet, Belkot, Beteni, Bhadratar, Bhalche, Budhasing, Bungtang, Charghare, Chaturale, Chaughada, Chauthe, Chhap, Dangsing, Deurali, Samir, Phikuri, Ganeshsthan, Gaunkharka, Gerkhu, Ghyangphedi, Gorsyang, Jiling, Kakani, Kalibas, Kalikahalde, Kalyanpur, Kaule, Khadag Bhanjyang, Kharanitar, Kholegaun Khanigaun, Kintang, Kumari, Lachyang, Likhu, Madanpur, Mahakali, Manakamana, Narjamandap, Okharpauwa, Panchkanya, Ralukadevi, Ratmate, Rautbesi, Salme, Samari, Samundradevi, Samundratar, Shikharbesi, Sikre, Sundaradevi, Sunkhani, Suryamati, Talakhu, Taruka, Thanapati, Thansing, Thaprek, Tupche, Urleni

==== Rasuwa District ====
Bhorle, Briddhim, Chilime, Dandagaun, Dhaibung, Gatlang, Goljung, Haku, Jibjibe, Laharepauwa, Langtang, Ramche, Saramthali, Syaphru, Thulogaun, Thuman, Timure, Yarsa

==== Sindhupalchok District ====
Atarpur, Badegau, Banskharka, Baramchi, Barhabise, Baruwa, Batase, Bhimtar, Bhote Namlang, Bhotsiba, Chaukati, Dhumthang, Dubarchaur, Gati, Ghorthali, Ghuskun, Gloche, Gumba, Gunsakot, Hagam, Haibung, Helambu, Ichok, Ikhu Bhanjyang, Jalbire, Jethal, Kalika, Karkhali, Katambas, Kiul, Kunchok, Langarche, Lisankhu, Listikot, Mahankal, Maneshwara, Mankha, Marming, Motang, Nawalpur, Pagretar, Palchok, Pangtang, Petaku, Phatakshila, Phulping Katti, Phulpingdanda, Phulpingkot, Piskar, Ramche, Sangachok, Selang, Sipa Pokhare, Sipal Kabhre, Sunkhani, Syaule Bazar, Tatopani, Tauthali, Tekanpur, Thakani, Thampal Chhap, Thangpalkot, Thokarpa, Thulo Dhading, Thulo Pakhar, Thulo Siruwari, Thum Pakhar, Timpul Ghyangul, Yamanadanda

=== Narayani Zone ===
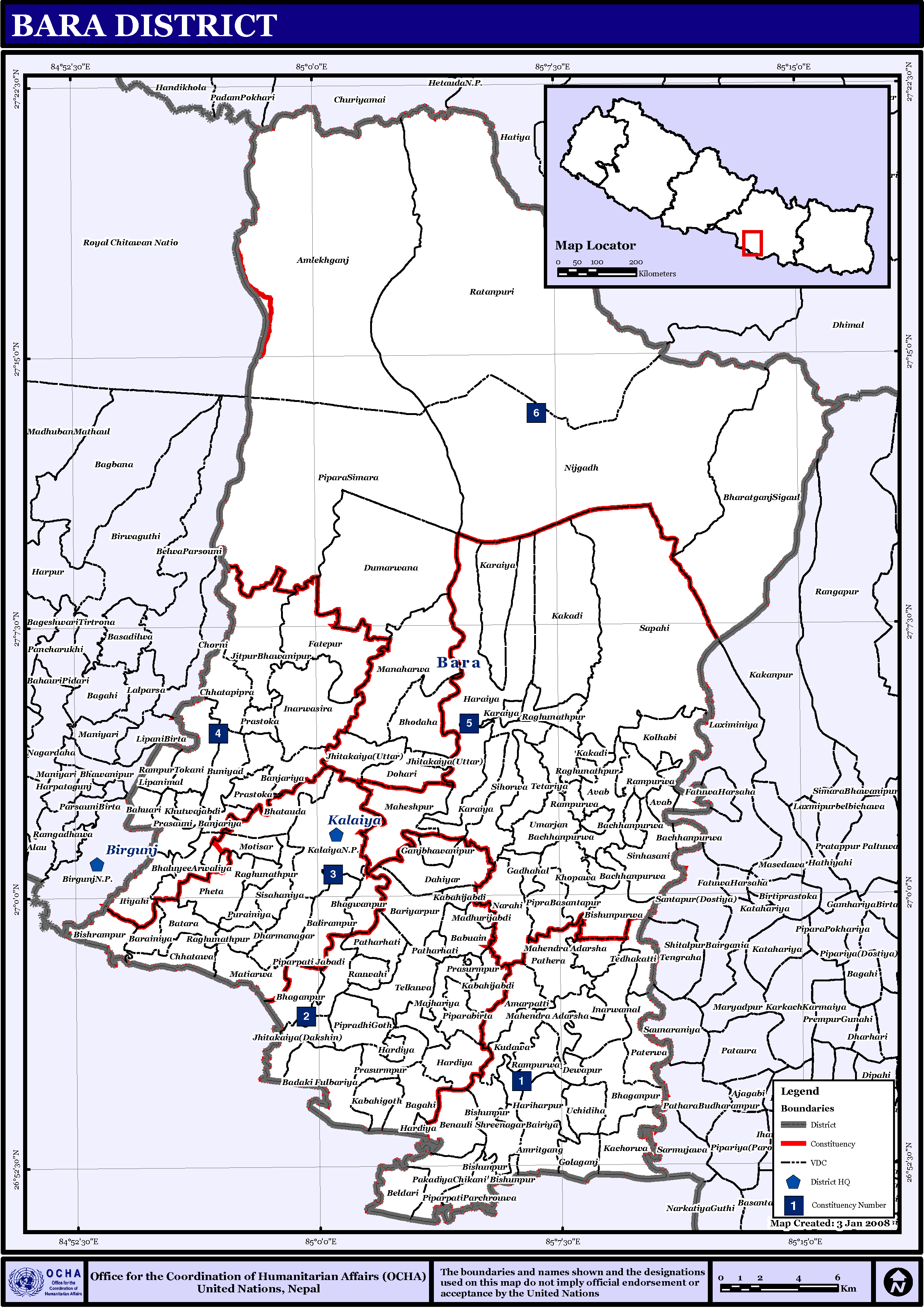
Bara District

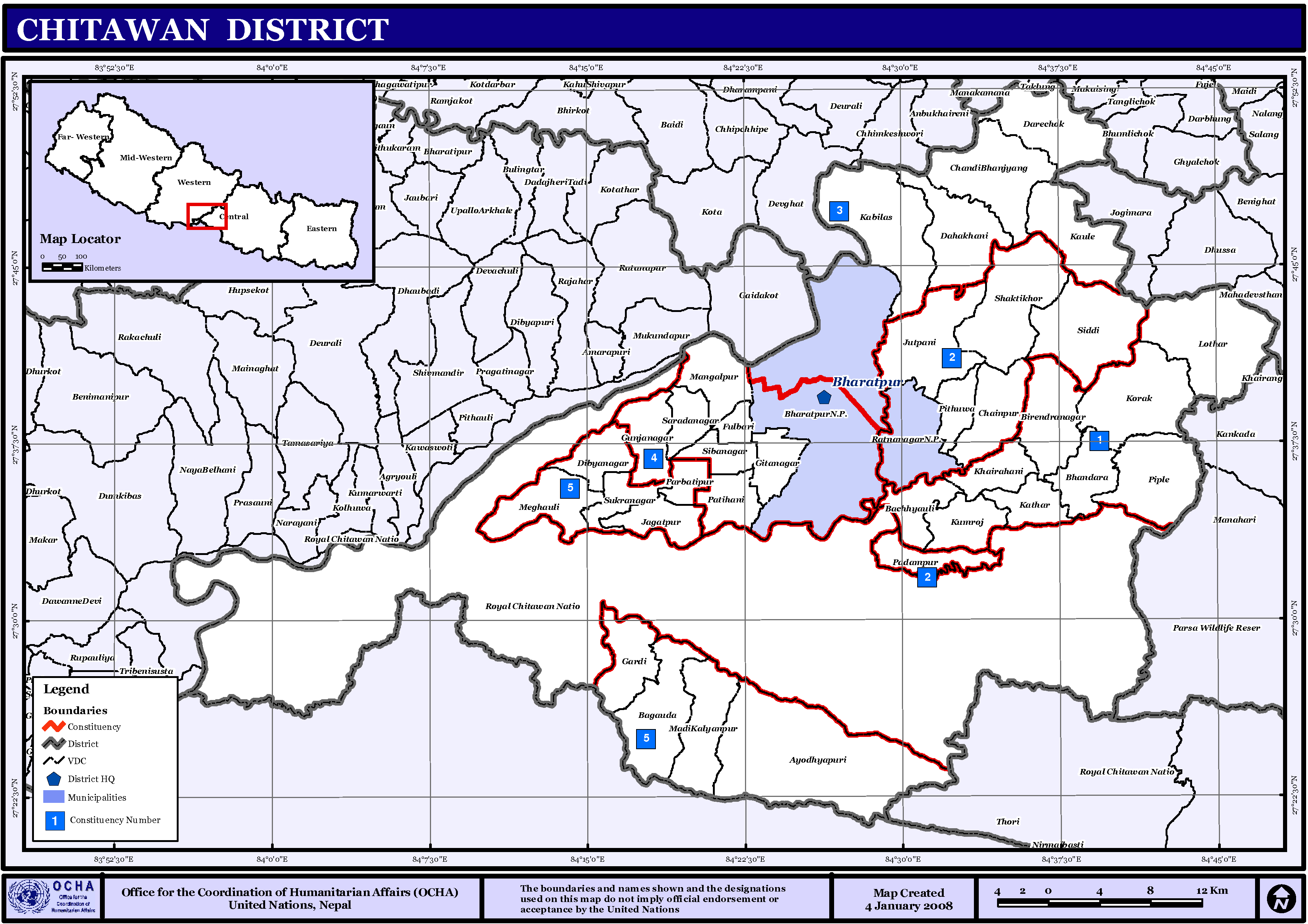
Chitwan District

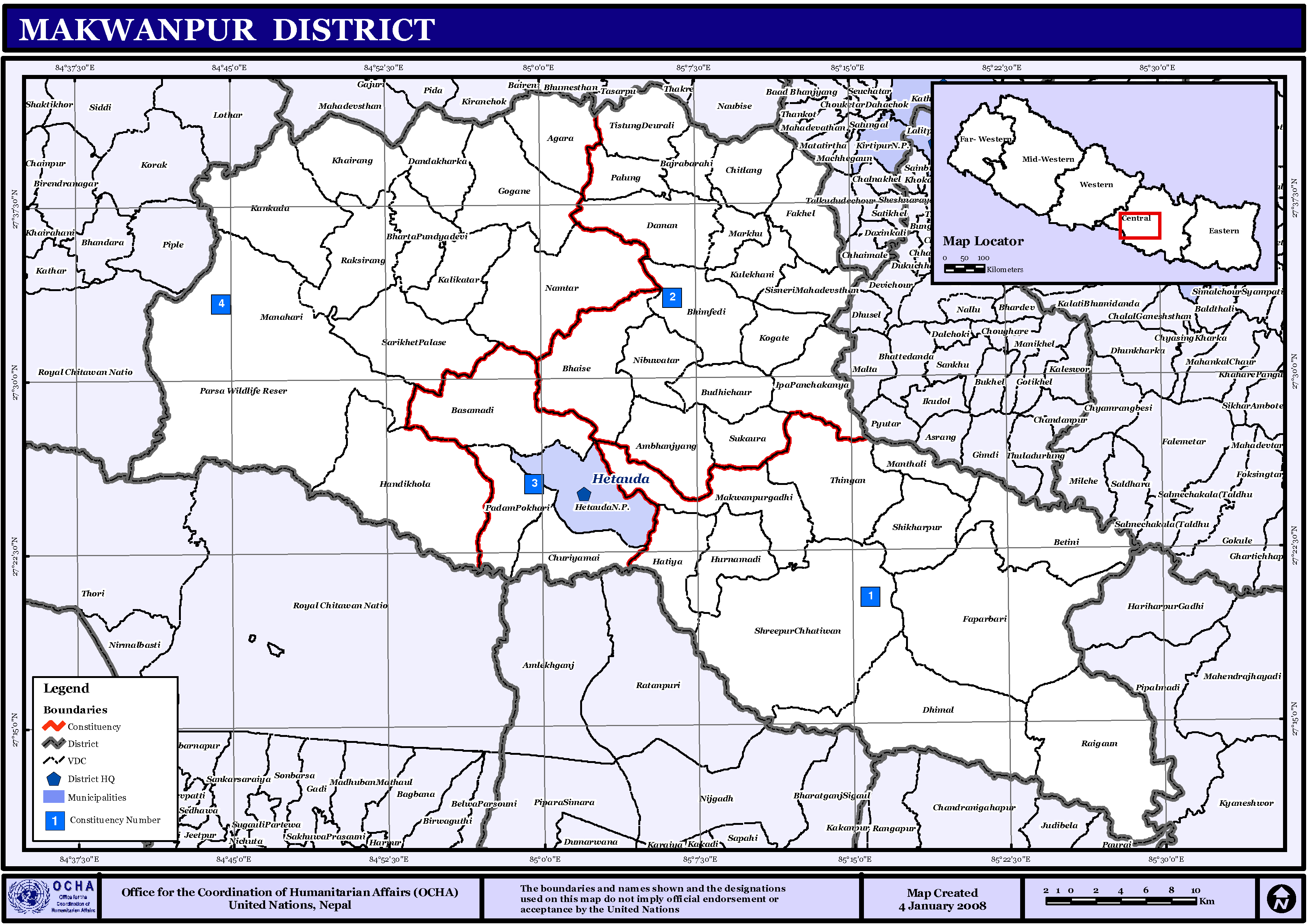
Makwanpur District

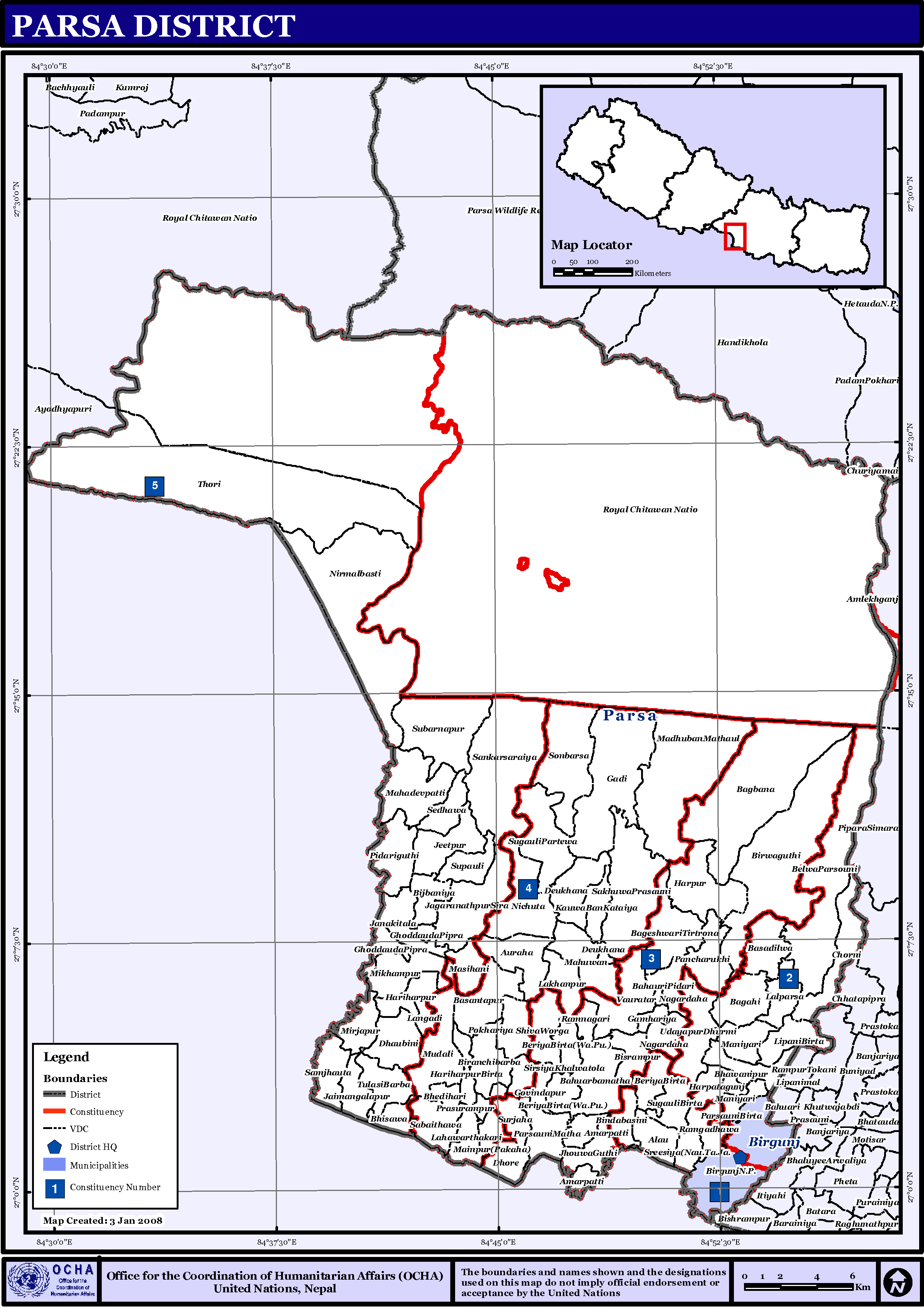
Parsa District

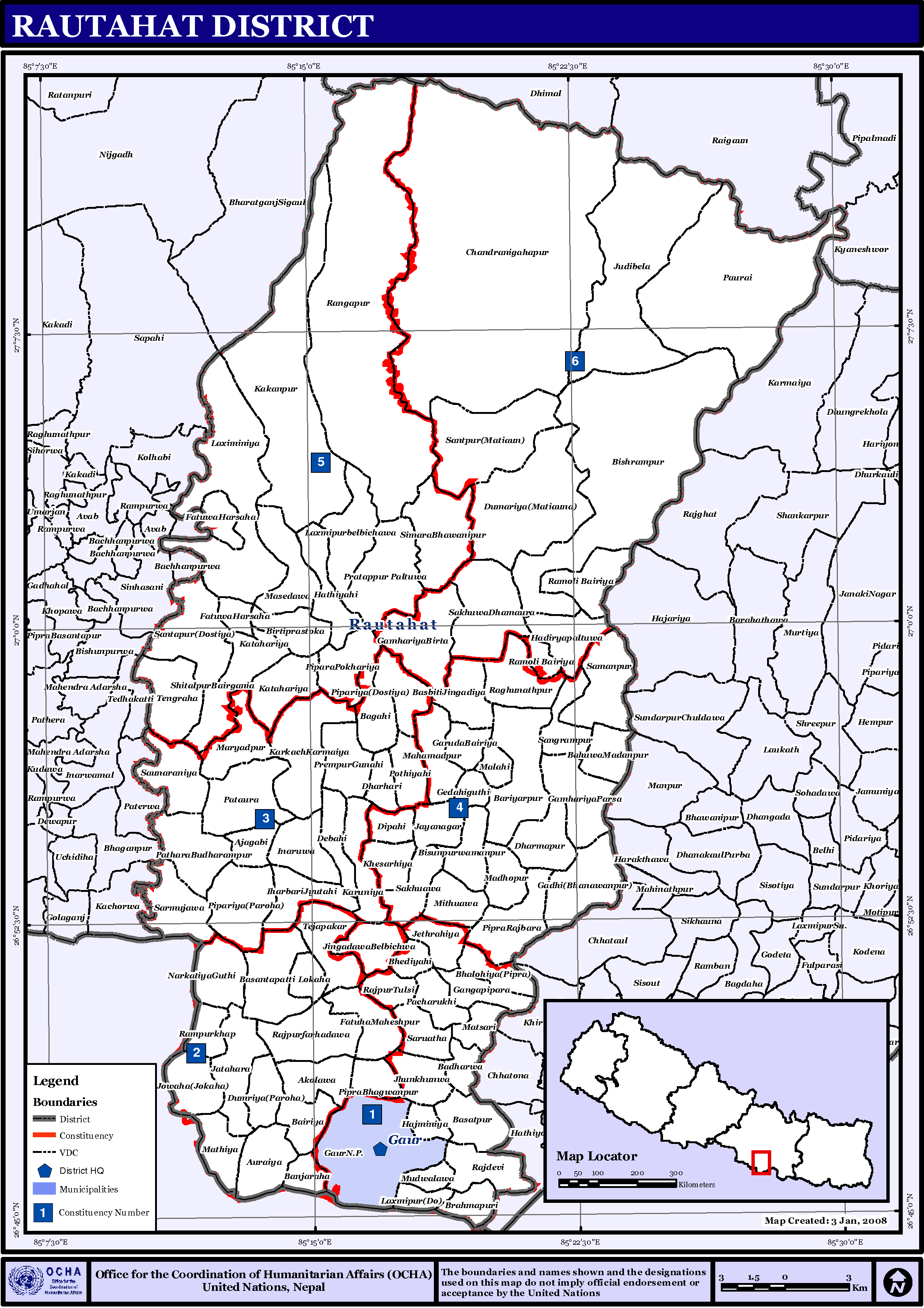
Rautahat District

==== Bara District ====
Amarpatti, Amlekhganj, Amritganj, Avab, Babuain, Bachhanpurwa, Badaki Phulbariya, Bagadi, Bahuari, Balirampur, Bandhuwan, Banjariya, Barainiya, Bariyarpur, Basantapur, Batara, Beldari, Benauli, Bhagwanpur, Bhaluwai Arwaliya, Bhatauda, Bhaudaha, Bhuluhi Marwaliya, Bishnupur, Bishnupurwa, Bishrampur, Biswambharpur, Brahmapuri, Buniyad, Chhatawa, Dahiyar, Dewapur, Dharmanagar, Dohari, Gadhahal, Ganj Bhawanipur, Golaganj, Haraiya, Hardiya, Hariharpur, Inarwamal, Inarwasira, Itiyahi, Jhitakaiya, Jitpur, Kabahigoth, Kabahijabdi, Kachorwa, Karaiya, Khopawa, Khutwajabdi, Kudawa, Lakshmipur Kotwali, Lipanimal, Madhurijabdi, Mahendra Adarsha, Maheshpur, Maini, Majhariya, Manaharwa, Matiarwa, Motisar, Naktuwa, Narahi, Pakadiya Chikani, Parsurampur, Paterwa, Patharhati, Pathora, Pheta, Piparpati Ek, Piparpati Dui, Piparpati Jabdi, Piparpati Parchrauwa, Pipra Basantapur, Piprabirta, Pipradhi Goth, Prasauni, Prastoka, Purainiya, Raghunathpur, Rampur Tokani, Rampurwa, Rauwahi, Srinagar Bairiya, Sihorwa, Sinhasani, Sisahaniya, Tedhakatti, Telkuwa, Terariya, Uchidiha, Umarjan

Former VDC: Pipara Simara, Jitpur Bhawanipur, Chhata Pipra, Phattepur, Dumbarwana, Ratnapuri, Bharatganj Singaul, Kakadi, Kolhabi, Prasona, Sapahi

==== Chitwan District ====
Ayodhyapuri, Bachhayauli, Bagauda, Bhandara, Birendranagar, Chandi Bhanjyang, Dahakhani, Darechok, Dibyanagar, Gardi, Gitanagar, Jagatpur, Jutpani, Kabilas, Kathar, Kaule, Korak, Lothar, Madi Kalyanpur, Mangalpur, Meghauli, Narayanpur, Padampur, Pancha Kanya, Parbatipur, Patihani, Phulbari, Piple, Pithuwa, Shaktikhor, Shivanagar, Siddi, Shukranagar khairahani

==== Makwanpur District ====
Ambhanjyang, Bajrabarahi, Basamadi, Betini, Bhainse, Bharta Pundyadevi, Bhimphedi, Budhichaur, Chhatiwan, Chitlang, Churiyamai, Daman, Dandakharka, Dhimal, Gogane, Handikhola, Hatiya, Hurnamadi, Ipa Panchakanya, Kalikatar, Kankada, Khairang, Kogate, Kulekhani, Makwanpurgadhi, Manahari, Manthali, Markhu, Namtar, Nibuwatar, Padma Pokhari, Palung, Phakhel, Phaparbadi, Raigaun, Raksirang, Sarikhet Palase, Shikharpur, Sisneri Mahadevsthan, Sukaura, Thingan, Tistung Deurali

==== Parsa District ====
Alau, Amarpatti, Auraha, Bagahi, Bagbana, Bageshwari, Bahauri Pidari, Bahuarba Bhatha, Basadilwa, Basantapur, Belwa Parsauni, Beriya Birta, Bhawanipur, Bhedihari, Bhisawa, Bijbaniya, Bindyabasini, Biranchibarba, Biruwa Guthi, Bisrampur, Charani, Deukhana, Dhaubini, Gadi, Gamhariya, Ghoddauda Pipra, Ghore, Govindapur, Hariharpur, Hariharpur Birta, Harapataganj, Harpur, Jagarnathpur Sira, Jaimanglapur, Janikatala, Jhauwa Guthi, Jitpur, Kauwa Ban Kataiya, Lahawarthakari, Lakhanpur, Lal Parsa, Langadi, Lipani Birta, Madhuban Mathaul, Mahadevpatti, Mahuwan, Mainiyari, Mainpur, Mikhampur, Mirjapur, Mosihani, Mudali, Nagardaha, Nirchuta, Nirmal Basti, Pancharukhi, Prasauni Birta, Parsauni Matha, Patbari Tola-Warwa, Paterwa Sugauli, Pidariguthi, Pokhariya, Prasurampur, Ramgadhawa, Ramnagari, Sabaithawa, Sakhuwa Parsauni, Samjhauta, Shankar Saraiya, Sapauli, Sedhawa, Shiva Worga, Sirsiya Khalwatola, Sonbarsa, Srisiya, Subarnapur, Sugauli Birta, Sugauli Partewa, Surjaha, Thori, Tulsi Barba, Udayapur Dhurmi, Vauratar

==== Rautahat District ====
Ajagabi, Akolawa, Auraiya, Badharwa, Bagahi, Bahuwa Madanpur, Bairiya, Banjaraha, Bariyarpur, Basantapatti, Basantapur, Basbiti Jingadiya, Bhalohiya, Bhediyahi, Birtipraskota, Bishrampur, Bisunpurwa Manpur, Brahmapuri, Debahi, Dharampur, Dharhari, Dipahi, Dumriya, Balchanpur, Gadhi, Gamhariya Birta, Gamhariya Parsa, Gangapipra, Garuda Bairiya, Gedahiguthi, Gunahi, Hajminiya, Hardiya Paltuwa, Harsaha, Hathiyahi, Inarbari Jyutahi, Inaruwa, Jatahare, Jayanagar, Jethrahiya, Jhunkhunma, Jingadawa Belbichhwa, Jingadiya, Jowaha, Judibela, Kakanpur, Karkach Karmaiya, Karuniya, Katahariya, Khesarhiya, Lakshminiya, Lakshmipur, Lakshmipur Belbichhawa, Lokaha, Madanpur, Madhopur, Mahamadpur, Malahi, Maryadpur, Masedawa, Mathiya, Matsari, Mithuawa, Mudwalawa, Narkatiya Guthi, Pacharukhi, Pataura, Pathara Budharampur, Paurai, Phatuha Maheshpur, Pipariya, Pipra Bhagwanpur, Pipra Pokhariya, Pipra Rajbara, Pothiyahi, Pratappur Paltuwa, Prempur Gunahi, Purainawma, Raghunathpur, Rajdevi, Rajpur Pharhadawa, Rajpur Tulsi, Ramoli Bairiya, Rampur Khap, Rangapur, Sakhuwa, Sakhuwa Dhamaura, Samanpur, Sangrampur, Santapur, Santpur, Sarmujawa, Saruatha, Saunaraniya, Sawagada, Shitalpur Bairgania, Simara Bhawanipur, Sirsiya, Tejapakar, Tengraha, Tikuliya

== Western Development Region ==
=== Gandaki Zone ===
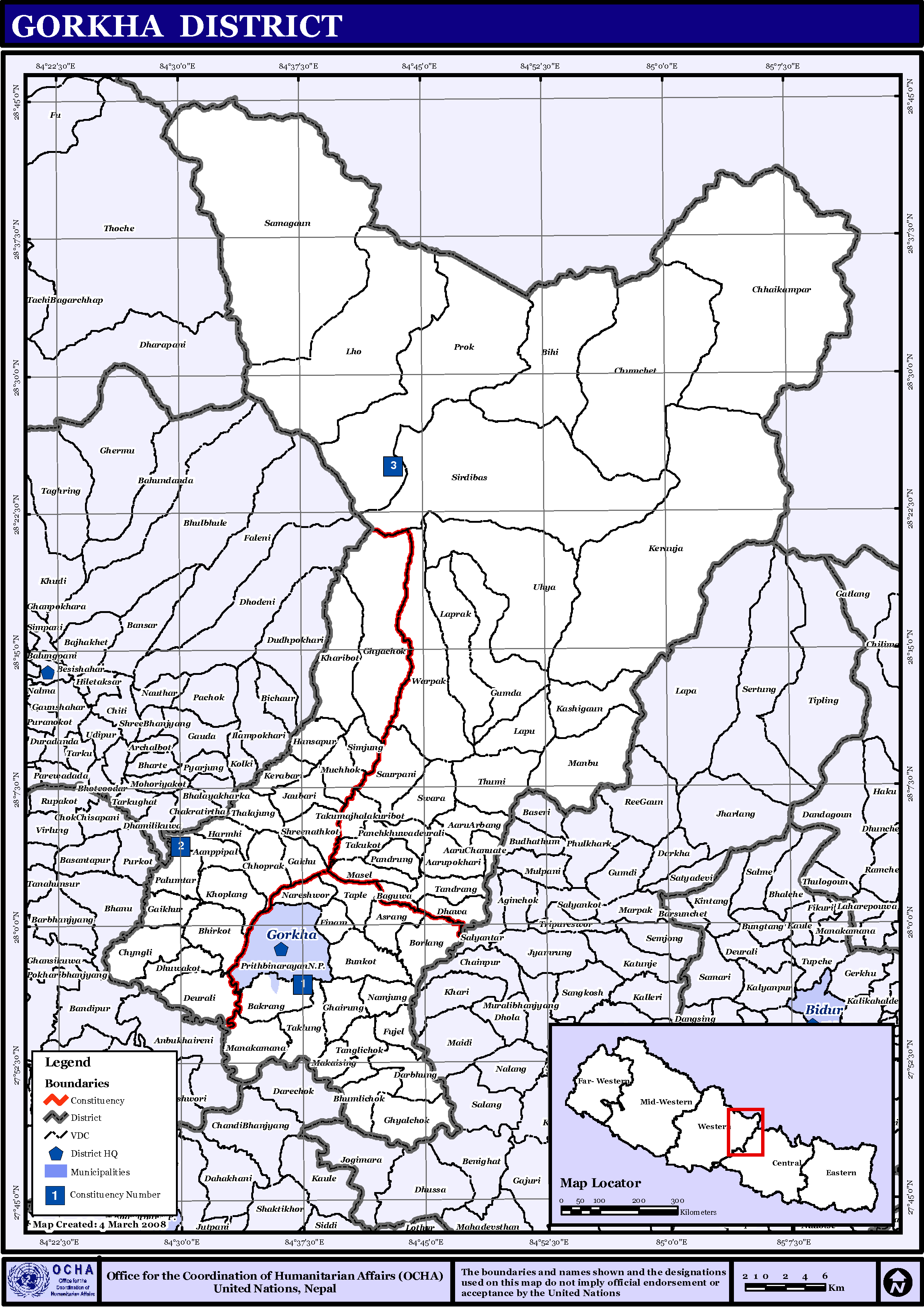
Gorkha District

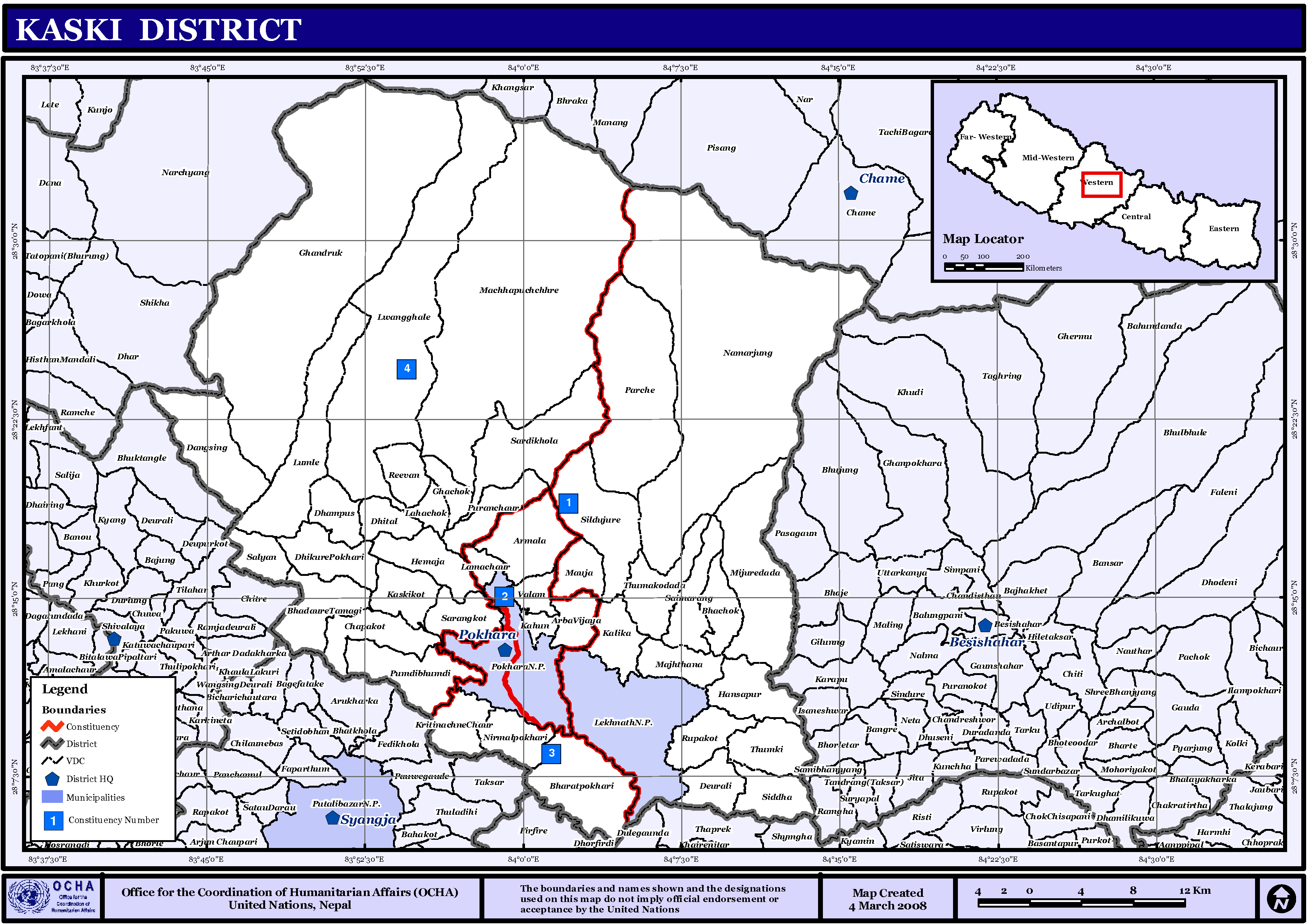
Kaski District

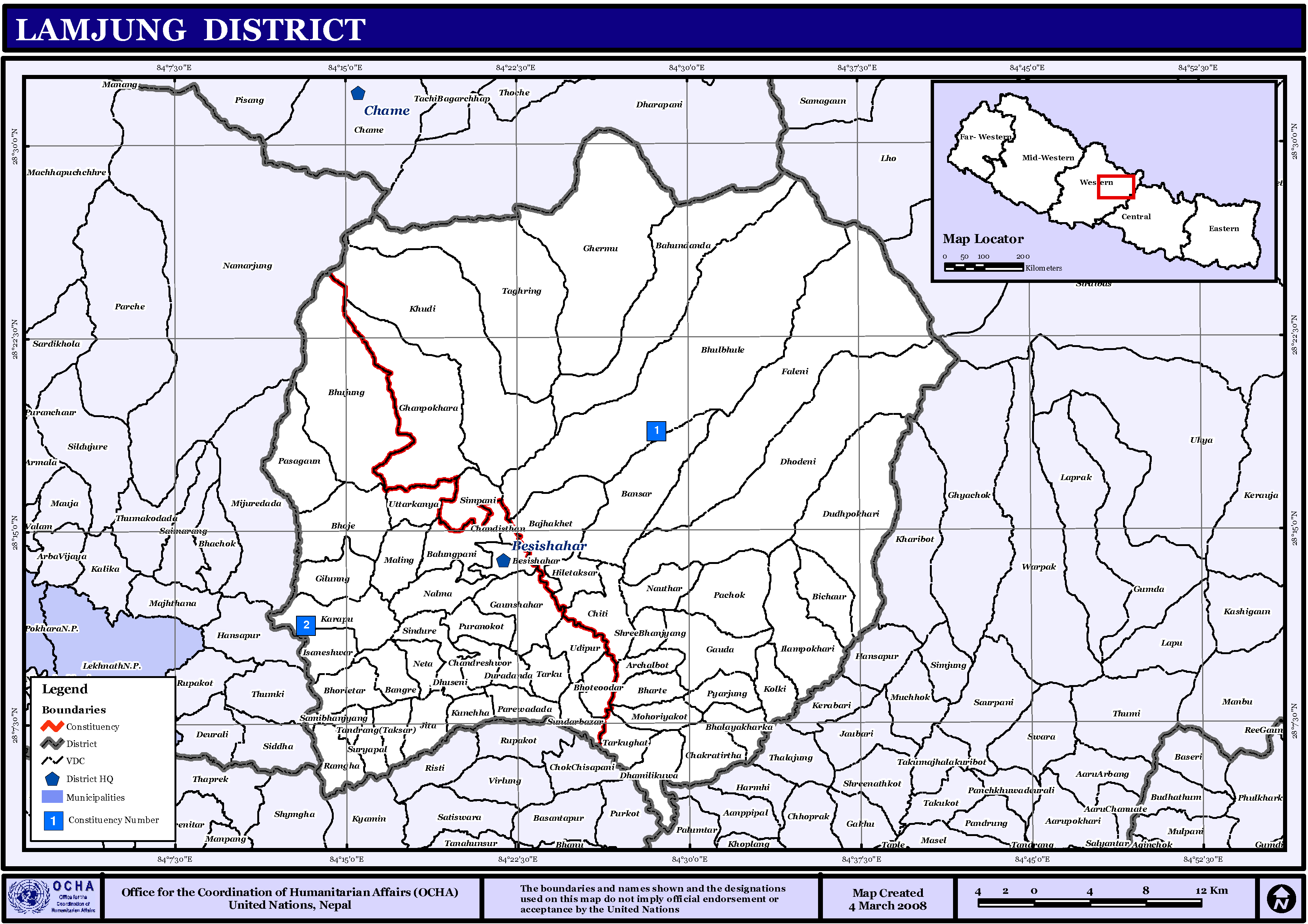
Lamjung District

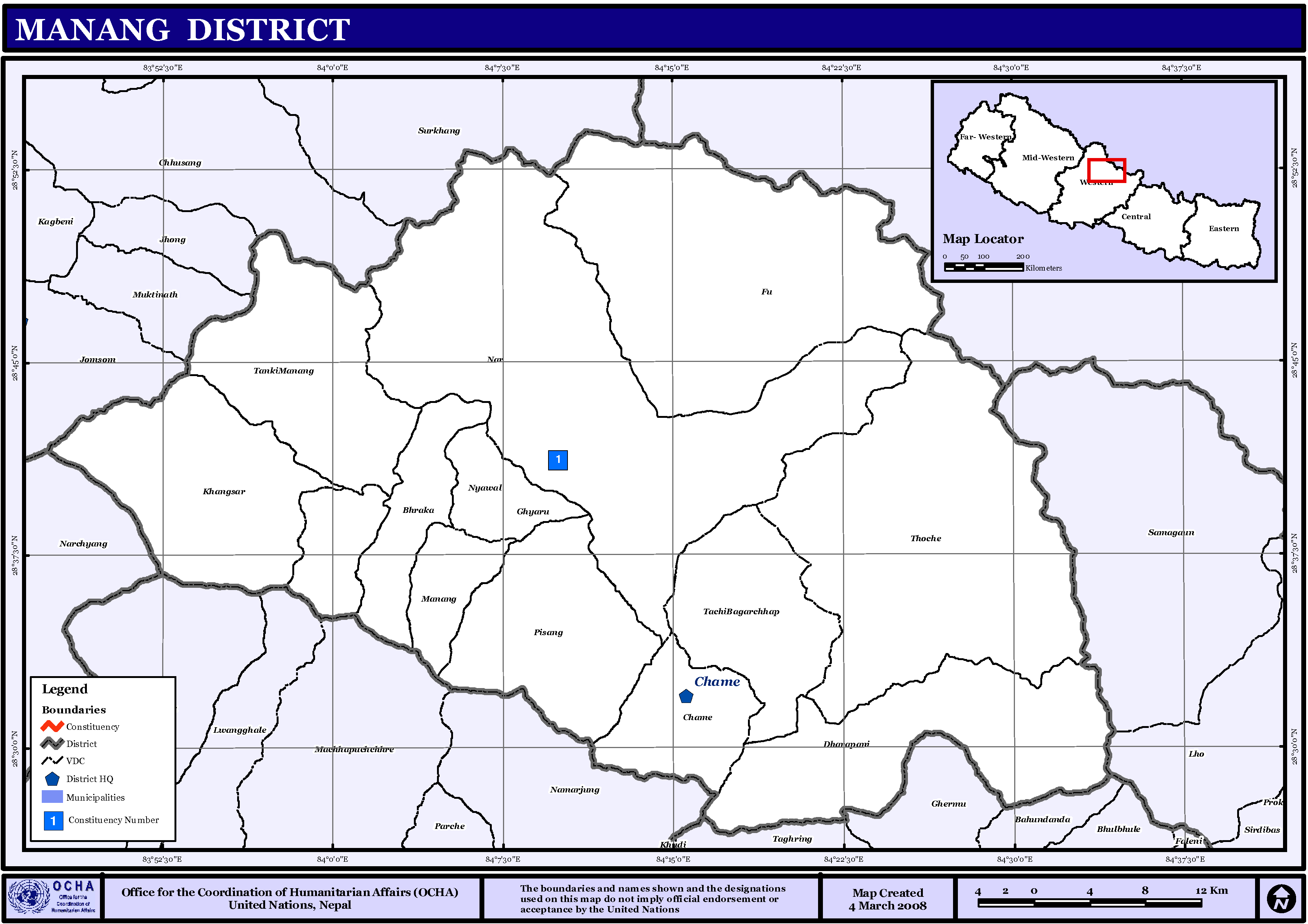
Manang District

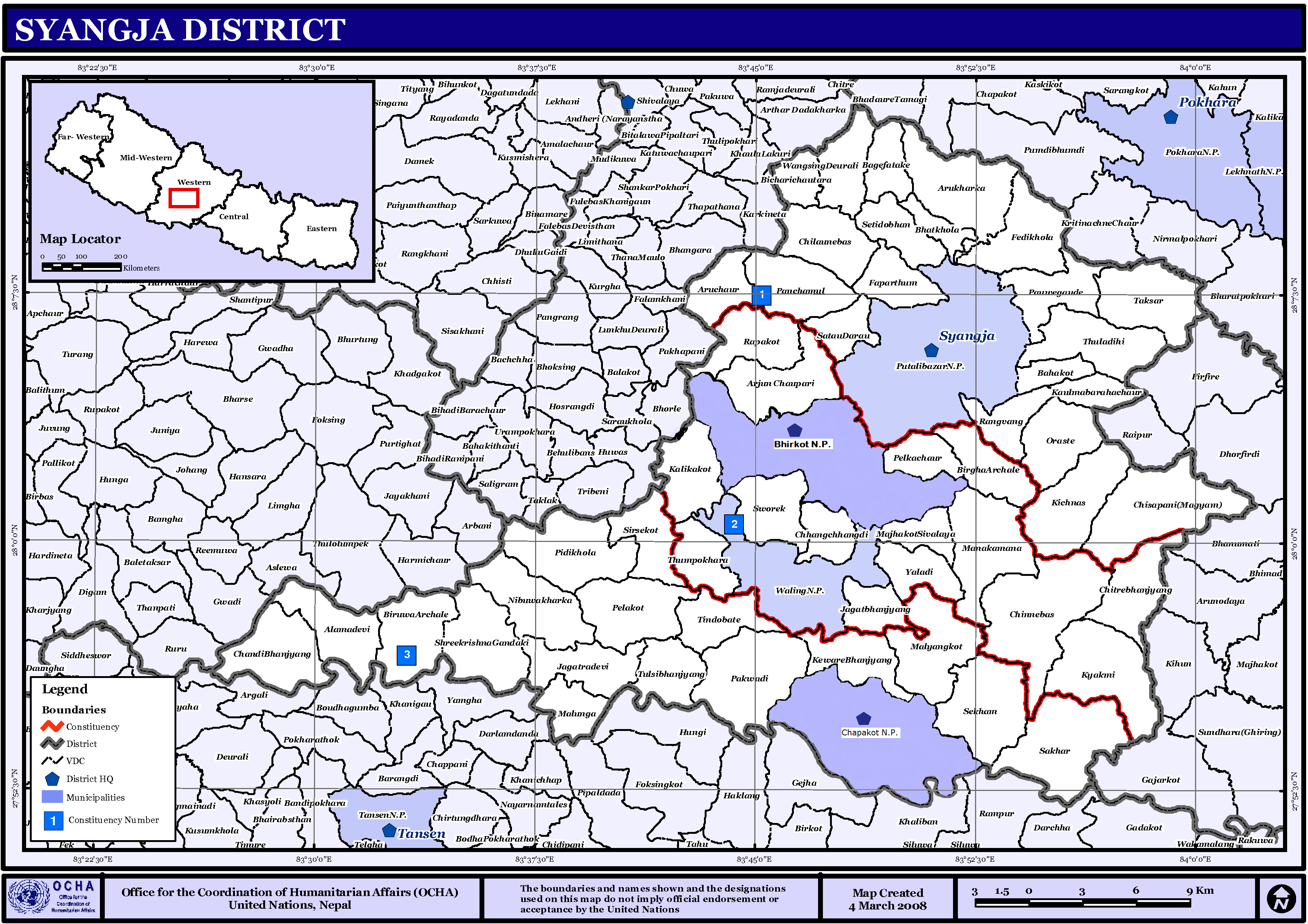
Syangja District

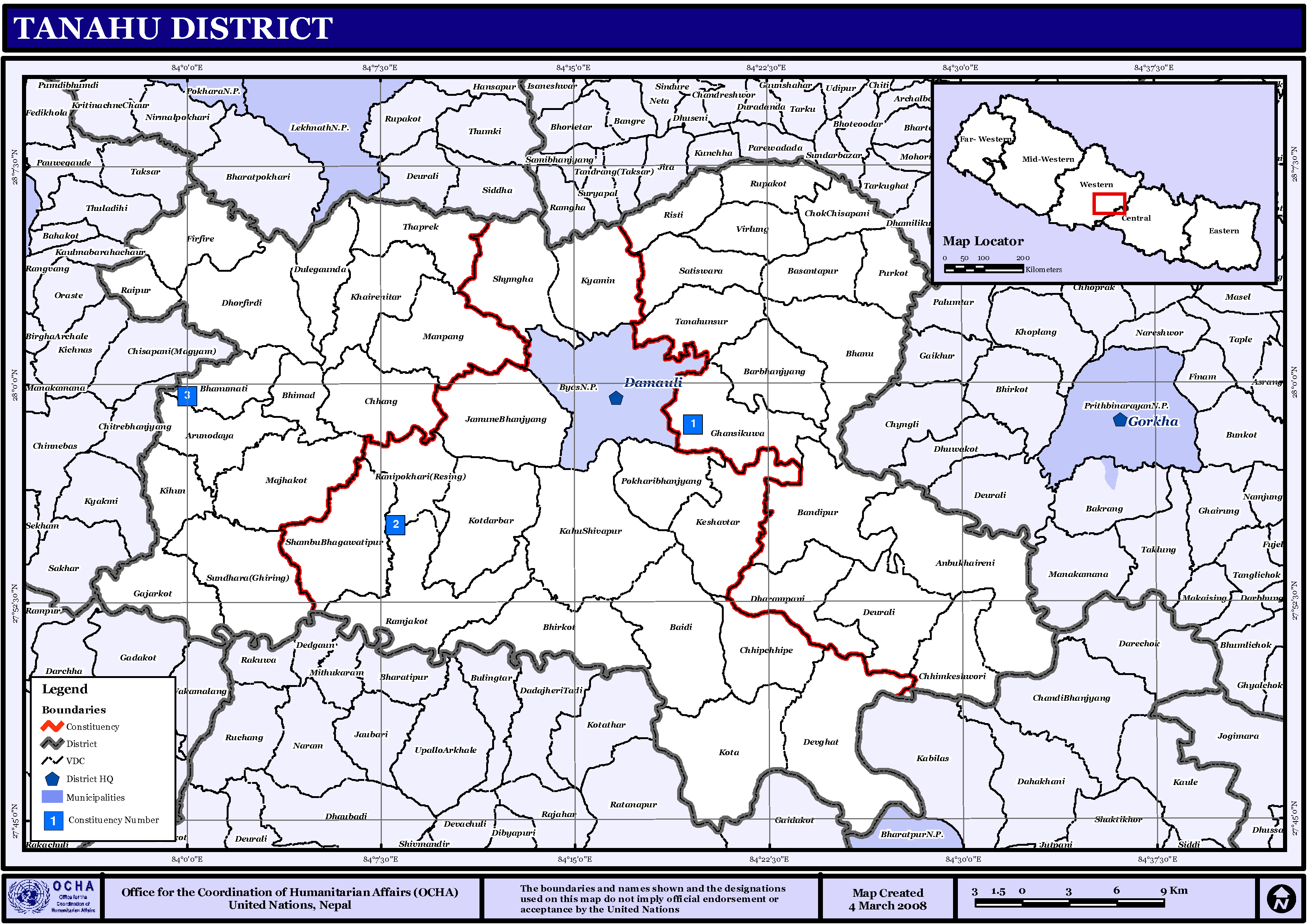
Tanahu District

==== Gorkha District ====
Aanppipal, Aaru Arbang, Aaru Chanuate, Aarupokhari, Asrang, Baguwa, Bakrang, Bhirkot, Bhumlichok, Bihi, Borlang, Bunkot, Chhaikampar, Chhoprak, Chumchet, Chyangli, Darbhung, Deurali, Dhawa, Dhuwakot, Gaikhur, Gakhu, Ghairung, Ghyachok, Ghyalchok, Gorakhkali, Gumda, Hansapur, Harmi, Jaubari, Kashigaun, Kerabari, Kerauja, Kharibot, Khoplang, Laprak, Lapu, Lho, Makaising, Manakamana, Manbu, Masel, Muchhok, Namjung, Nareshwar, Palumtar, Panchkhuwadeurali, Pandrung, Phinam, Phujel, Prok, Ranishwara, Samagaun, Saurpani, Srinathkot, Simjung, Sirdibas, Swara, Taklung, Takukot, Takumajhalakuribot, Tandrang, Tanglichok, Taple, Tara Nagar, Thalajung, Thumi, Uiya, Warpak

==== Kaski District ====
Arba Vijaya, Armala, Garlang, Begnas, Bhachok, Bhadaure Tamagi, Bharat Pokhari, Chapakot, Dangsing, Deurali, Dhampus, Dhikure Pokhari, Dhital, Ghachok, Ghandruk, Hansapur, Hemaja, Kahun, Kalika, Kaskikot, Kristinachnechaur, Lahachok, Lamachaur, Lumle, Lwangghale, Machhapuchchhre, Majhthana, Mala, Mauja, Mijuredanda, Namarjung, Nirmalpokhari, Parche, Pumdibhumdi, Puranchaur, Rakhi, Ribhan, Rupakot, Saimarang, Salyan, Sarangkot, Sardikhola, Shisuwa, Siddha, Sildujure, Thumakodanda, Thumki, Bhalam

==== Lamjung District ====
Archalbot, Bahundanda, Bajhakhet, Balungpani, Bangre, Bansar, Bhalayakharka, Bharte, Bhoje, Bhorletar, Bhotewodar, Bhujung, Bhulbhule, Bichaur, Chakratirtha, Chandreshwar, Chiti, Dhamilikuwa, Dhodeni, Dhuseni, Dudhpokhari, Duradanda, Gauda, Ghanpokhara, Ghermu, Gilung, Hiletaksar, Ilampokhari, Ishaneshwar, Jita, Karapu, Khudi, Kolki, Kunchha, Maling, Mohoriyakot, Nalma, Nauthar, Neta, Pachok, Parewadanda, Pasagaun, Phaleni, Puranokot, Pyarjung, Rangha, Samibhanjyang, Srimanjyang, Simpani, Sindure, Sundarbazar, Suryapal, Taghring, Tandrang, Tarku, Tarkughat, Uttarkanya

==== Manang District ====
Bagarchhap, Bhakra, Chame, Dharapani, Ghyaru, Khangsar, Manang, Nar, Nyawal, Pisang, Phu, Tachi Bagarchhap, Tanki Manang, Thoche

==== Syangja District ====
Almadevi, Arjun Chaupari, Aruchaur, Arukharka, Bagephatake, Bahakot, Banethok Deurali, Bhatkhola, Bichari Chautara, Birgha Archale, Biruwa Archale, Chandi Bhanjyang, Chandikalika, Chhangchhangdi, Chilaunebas, Chimnebas, Chisapani, Chitre Bhanjyang, Darsing Dahathum, Dhanubase, Dhapuk Simal Bhanjyang, Ganeshpur, Iladi, Jagat Bhanjyang, Jagatradevi, Kalikakot, Karendanda, Kolma Barahachaur, Keware Bhanjyang, Khilung Deurali, Kichnas, Kyakami, Majhakot Sivalaya, Malengkot, Manakamana, Nibuwakharka, Oraste, Pakbadi, Panchamul, Pauwegaude, Pekhuwa Baghakhor, Pelakot, Pelkachaur, Phaparthum, Phedikhola, Pindikhola, Rangvang, Rapakot, Sakhar, Daraun, Satupasal, Sekham, Setidobhan, Srikrishna Gandaki, Sirsekot, Sorek, Taksar, Thuladihi, Thumpokhara, Tindobate, Tulsibhanjyang, Wangsing Deurali, Yaladi

==== Tanahu District ====
Ambukhaireni, Arunodaya, Baidi, Barbhanjyang, Basantapur, Bhanu, Bhanumati, Bhimad, Bhirkot, Bhirlung, Chhang, Chhimkeshwari, Chhipchhipe, Chok Chisapani, Deurali, Devghat, Dharampani, Gajarkot, Ghansikuwa, Jamune Bhanjyang, Kabilas, Kahu Shivapur, Keshavtar, Kihun, Kota, Kotdarbar, Kyamin, Majhakot, Manpang, Phirphire, Pokhari Bhanjyang, Purkot, Raipur, Ramjakot, Ranipokhari, Risti, Rupakot, Samungbhagawati, Satiswara, Sundhara, Syamgha, Tanahunsur, Thaprek,

=== Lumbini Zone ===
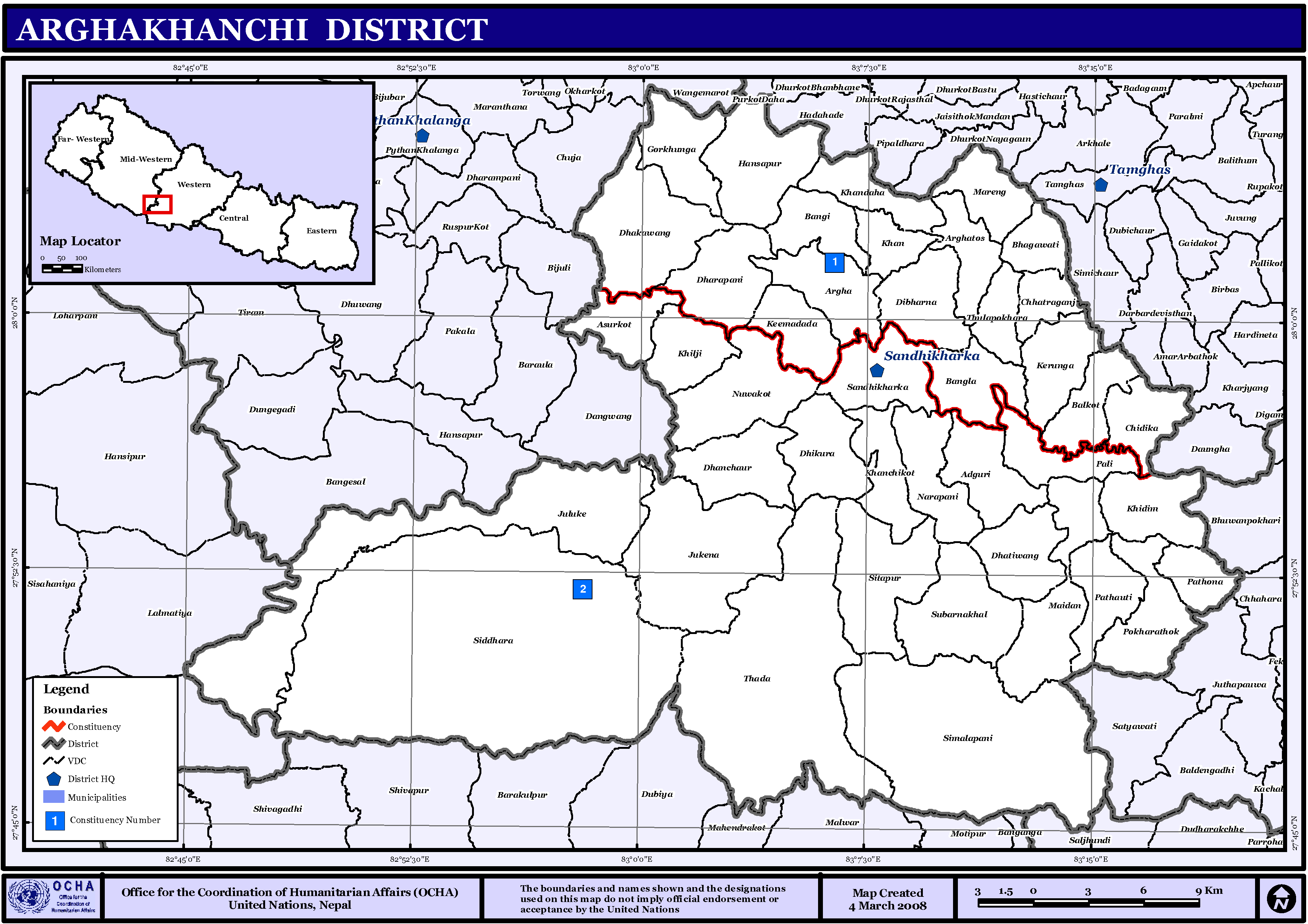
Arghakhanchi District

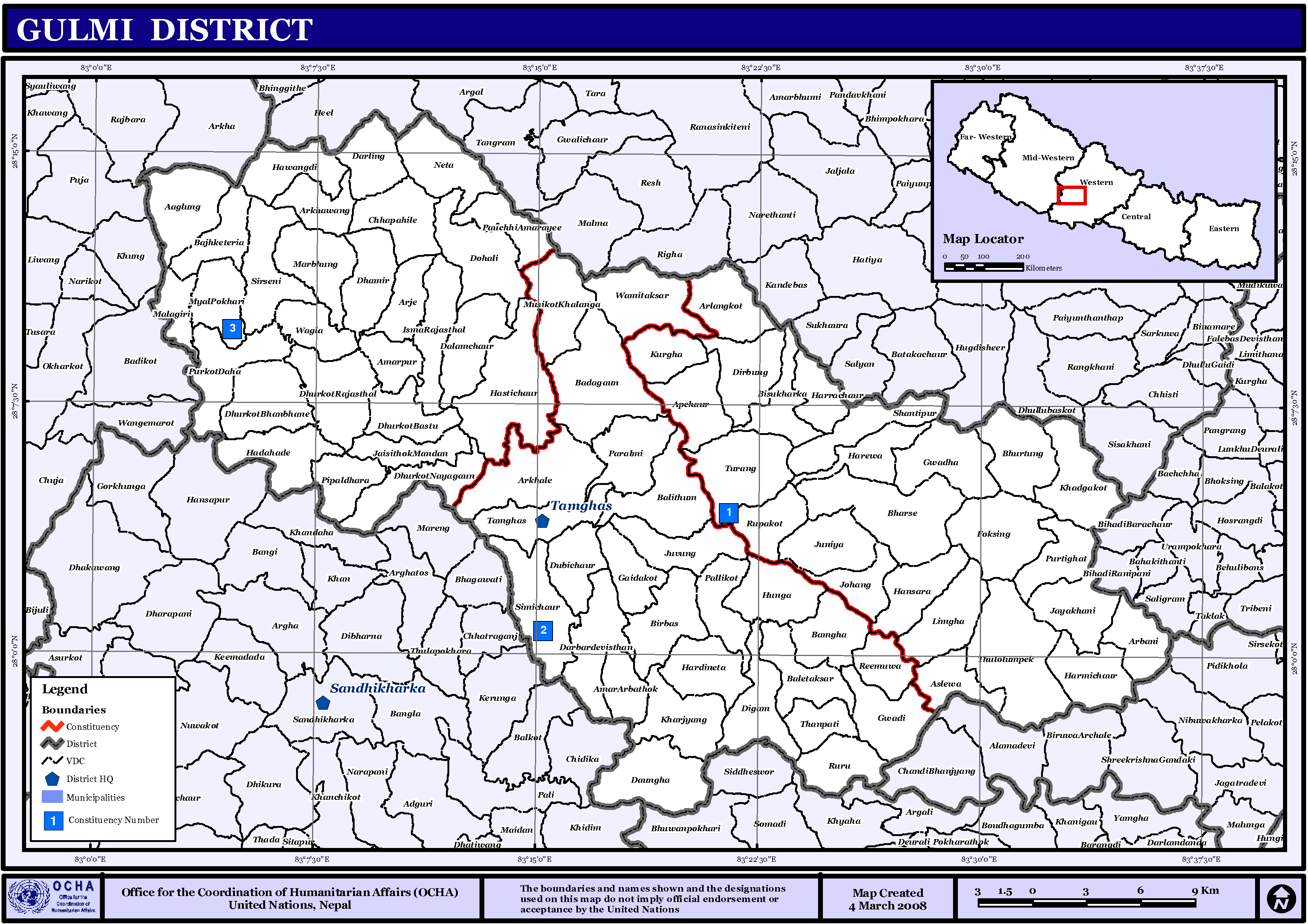
Gulmi District

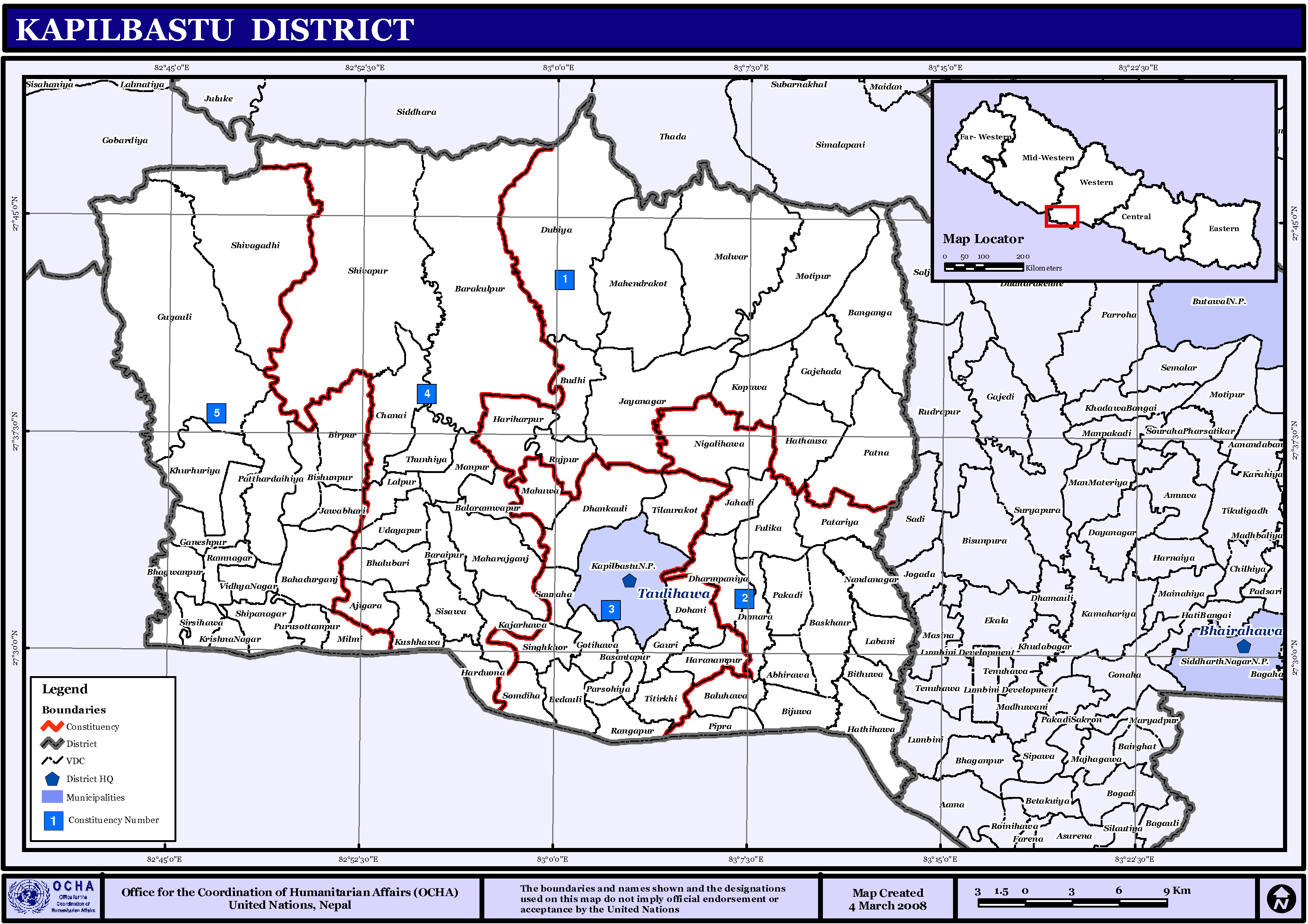
Kapilvastu District

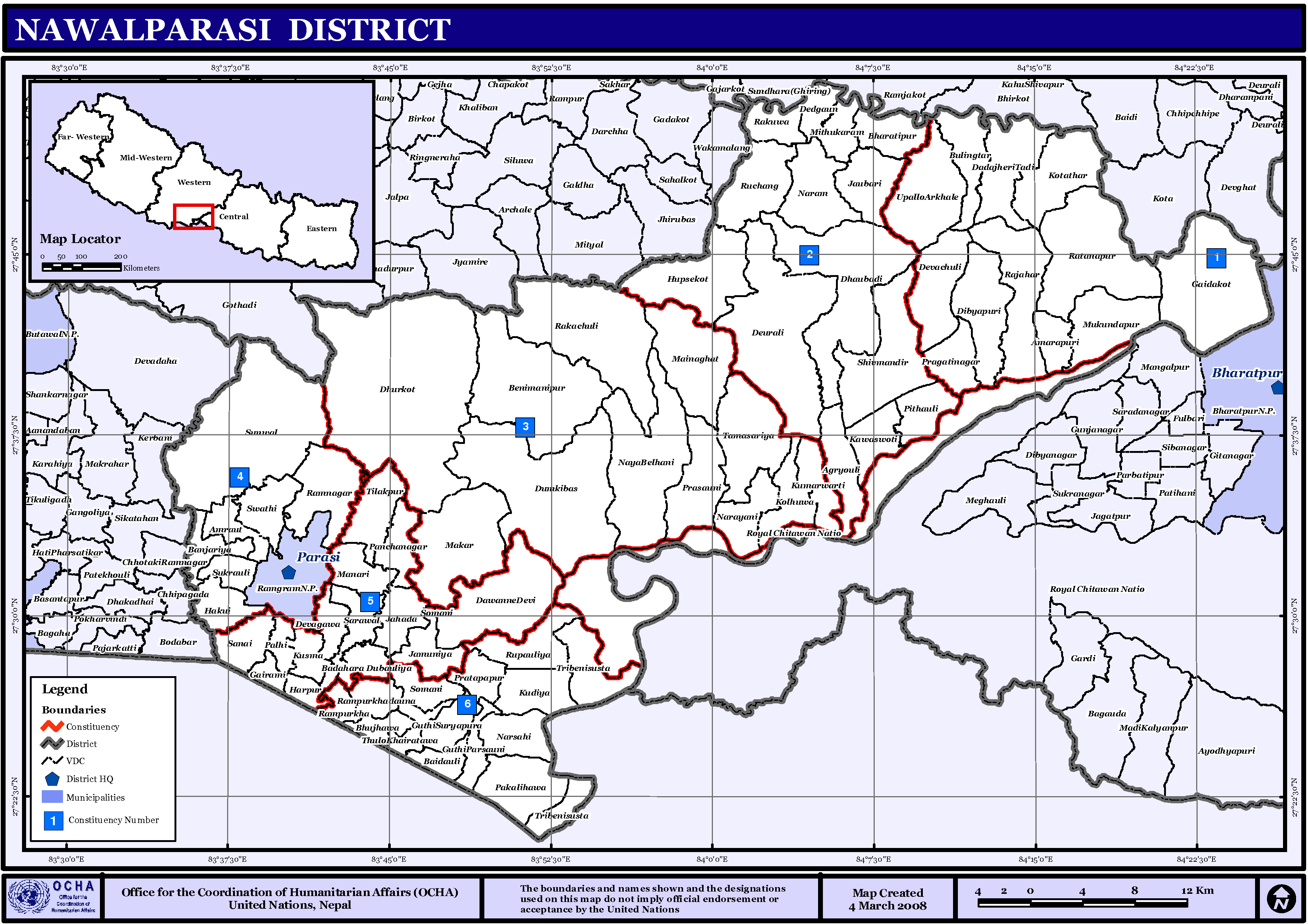
Nawalparasi District

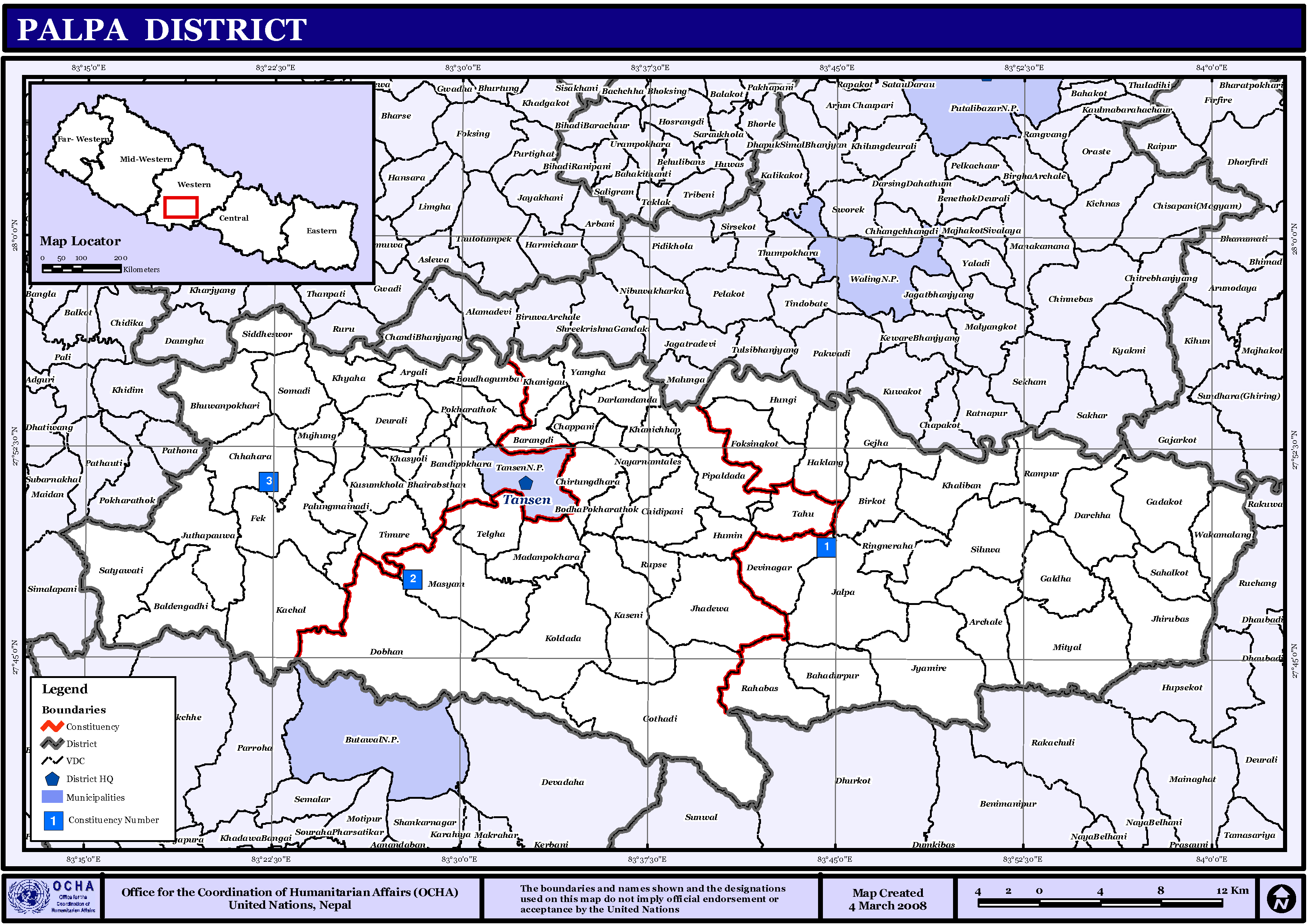
Palpa District

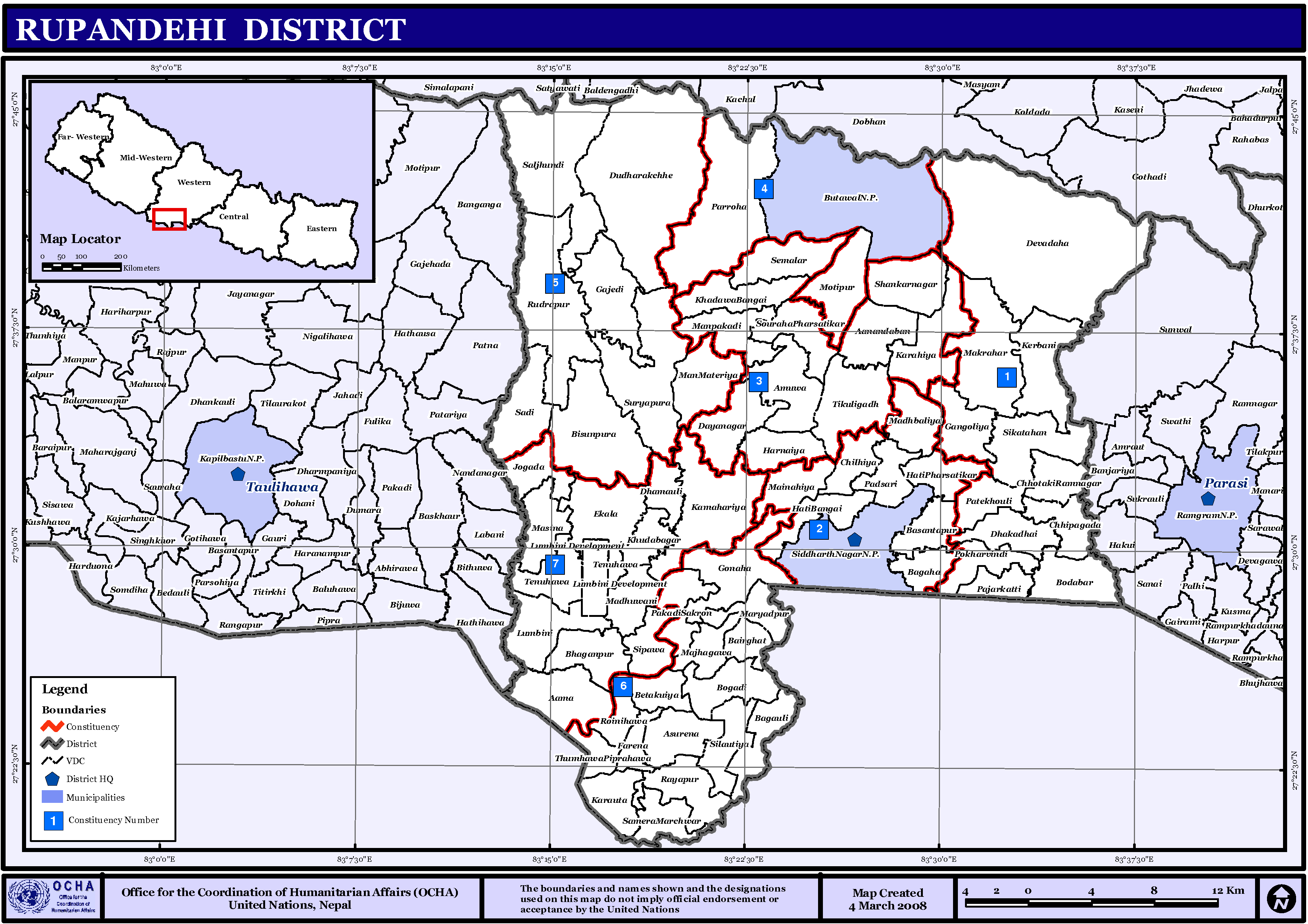
Rupandehi District

==== Arghakhanchi District ====
Adguri, Arghatos, Asurkot, Balkot, Bangi, Bhagawati, Chhatraganj, Chidika, Dhakawang, Dhanchaur, Dharapani, Dhatiwang, Dhikura, Gorkhunga, Hansapur, Jukena, Juluke, Kerunga, Khan, Khandaha, Khidim, Khilji, Maidan, Mareng, Nuwakot, Pali, Panena, Pathauti, Pathona, Pokharathok, Siddhara, Simalapani, Sitapur, Subarnakhal, Thada, Thulo Pokhara

==== Gulmi District ====
Aaglung, Amararwathok, Amarpur, Apchaur, Arbani, Arje, Arkhawang, Arlangkot, Aslewa, Badagaun, Bajhketeri, Baletaksar, Balithum, Bamgha, Bami, Bastu, Bhanbhane, Bhangari, Bharse, Bhurmung, Birbas, Bisukharka, Chhapahile, Dalamchaur, Darbar Devisthan, Darling, Daungha, Dhamir, Dhurkot Bastu, Dhurkot Bhanbhane, Dhurkot Nayagaun, Dhurkot Rajasthal, Digam, Dirbung, Dohali, Dubichaur, Dusma Rajasthal, Gaidakot, Gurukot Rajasthal, Gwadha, Gwadi, Hadahade, Hadinete, Hansara, Harewa, Harmichaur, Harrachaur, Hasara, Hastichaur, Hawangdi, Hunga, Jaisithok, Jayakhani, Johang, Juniya, Jubhung, Khadgakot, Kharjyang, Kurgha, Limgha, Malagiri, Marbhung, Musikot, Myal Pokhari, Nayagaun, Neta, Palkikot, Paralmi, Paudi Amarahi, Pipaldhara, Phoksing, Purkot Daha, Purtighat, Rimuwa, Rupakot, Ruru, Shantipur, Siseni, Thanpati, Thulo Lumpek, Turang, Wagla, Wamitaksar

==== Kapilvastu District ====
Abhirawa, Ajingara, Bahadurganj, Jamuni, Sukharampur, Balarampur, Baluhawa, Bangai, Banganga, Baraipur, Barakulpur, Basantapur, Baskhaur, Bedauli, Bhagawanpur Choti, Bhalabari, Bijuwa, Bithuwa, Budhi, Dhankauli, Dharampaniya, Dohani, Dubiya, Dumara, Gajehada, Ganeshpur, Gauri, Gotihawa, Gugauli, Haranampur, Hardauna, Hariharpur, Hathausa, Hathihawa, Jahadi, Jayanagar, Kajarhawa, Khurhuriya, Kopawa, Kushawa, Labani, Lalpur, Maharajganj, Mahendrakot, Mahuwa, Malwar, Manpur, Milmi, Motipur, Nanda Nagar, Nigalihawa, Pakadi, Parsohiya, Patariya, Patna, Patthardaihiya, Phulika, Pipari, Purusottampur, Rajpur, Ramghat, Ramnagar, Rangapur, Sauraha, Shivagadhi, Singhkhor, Sisawa, Shivapur Palta, Somdiha, Taulihawa, Thunhiya, Tilaurakot, Titirkhi, Udayapur, Vidhya Nagar

==== Nawalparasi District ====
Amarapuri, Amraut, Badahara Dubauliya, Baidauli, Banjariya, Benimanipur, Bharatipur, Bhujhawa, Bulingtar, Dadajheri Tadi, Dawanne Devi, Dedgaun, Deurali, Devagawa, Dhobadi, Dhurkot, Dumkibas, Gairami, Guthi Parsauni, Guthisuryapura, Hakui, Harpur, Humsekot, Jahada, Jamuniya, Jamuwad, Jaubari, Kolhuwa, Kotathar, Kudiya, Kumarwarti, Kusma, Mainaghat, Manari, Manjhariya, Mithukaram, Mukundapur, Naram, Narsahi, Naya Belhani, Pakalihawa, Palhi, Parasi, Parsauni, Pratappur, Rajahar, Rakachuli, Rakuwa, Ramnagar, Rampur Khadauna, Rampurwa, Ratnapur, Ruchang, Rupauliya, Sanai, Sarawal, Somani, Sukrauli, Suryapura, Swathi, Tamasariya, Thulo Khairatawa, Tilakpur, Tribenisusta, Unwach, Upallo Arkhale

==== Palpa District ====
Archale, Argali, Bahadurpur, Baldengadhi, Bandi Pokhara, Barandi, Bhairabsthan, Bhuwan Pokhari, Birkot, Bodhapokharathok, Boudhagumba, Chappani, Chhahara, Chidipani, Chirtungdhara, Darchha, Darlamdanda, Deurali, Devinagar, Dobhan, Gadakot, Galgha, Gegha, Gothadi, Haklang, Humin, Hungi, Jalpa, Jhadewa, Jhirubas, Juthapauwa, Jyamire, Kachal, Kaseni, Khaliban, Khaniban, Khanichhap, Khanigau, Khasyoli, Khyaha, Koldada, Kusumkhola, Madanpokhara, Mainadi, Masyam, Mityal, Mujhung, Narayanmatales, Palung Mainadi, Phek, Phoksingkot, Pipaldada, Pokharathok, Rahabasy, Ringneraha, Rupse, Sahalkot, Satyawati, Siddheshwar, Siluwa, Somadi, Tahu, Telgha, Thu, Timurekha, Wakamalang, Yangha

==== Rupandehi District ====
Aama, Amari, Amawa Marchawar, Amuwa Paschim, Asurena, Babhani, Bagaha, Bagauli, Bairghat, Balarampur, Bangai, Bangai Marchwar, Baragadewa, Barsauli, Basantapur, Betakuiya, Bisunpura, Bodabar, Bogadi, Chhipagada, Chhotaki Ramnaga, Chilhiya, Dayanagar, Dhakadhai, Dhamauli, Dudharakchhe, Gajedi, Gangoliya, Gonaha, Hanaiya, Hati Bangai, Hati Pharsatika, Jogada, Kamahariya, Kuttwa, Karauta, Karmahawa, Kataya, Kerbani, Khadawa Bangai, Mainahiya, Man Materiya, Man Pakadi, Maryadpur, Motipur, Padsari, Pajarkatli, Pakadi Sakron, Parroha, Parsa, Patekhauli, Pharena, Pharsatikar, Pharsatikarhati, Piprahawa, Pokharvindi, Rayapur, Roinihawa, Rudrapur, Sadi, Saljhundi, Samera Marchwar, Semalar, Sikatahan, Silautiya, Sipawa, Sauraha Pharsatikar, Suryapura, Tama Nagar, Tarkulaha, Tharki, Thumhawa Piprahawa

=== Dhaulagiri Zone ===
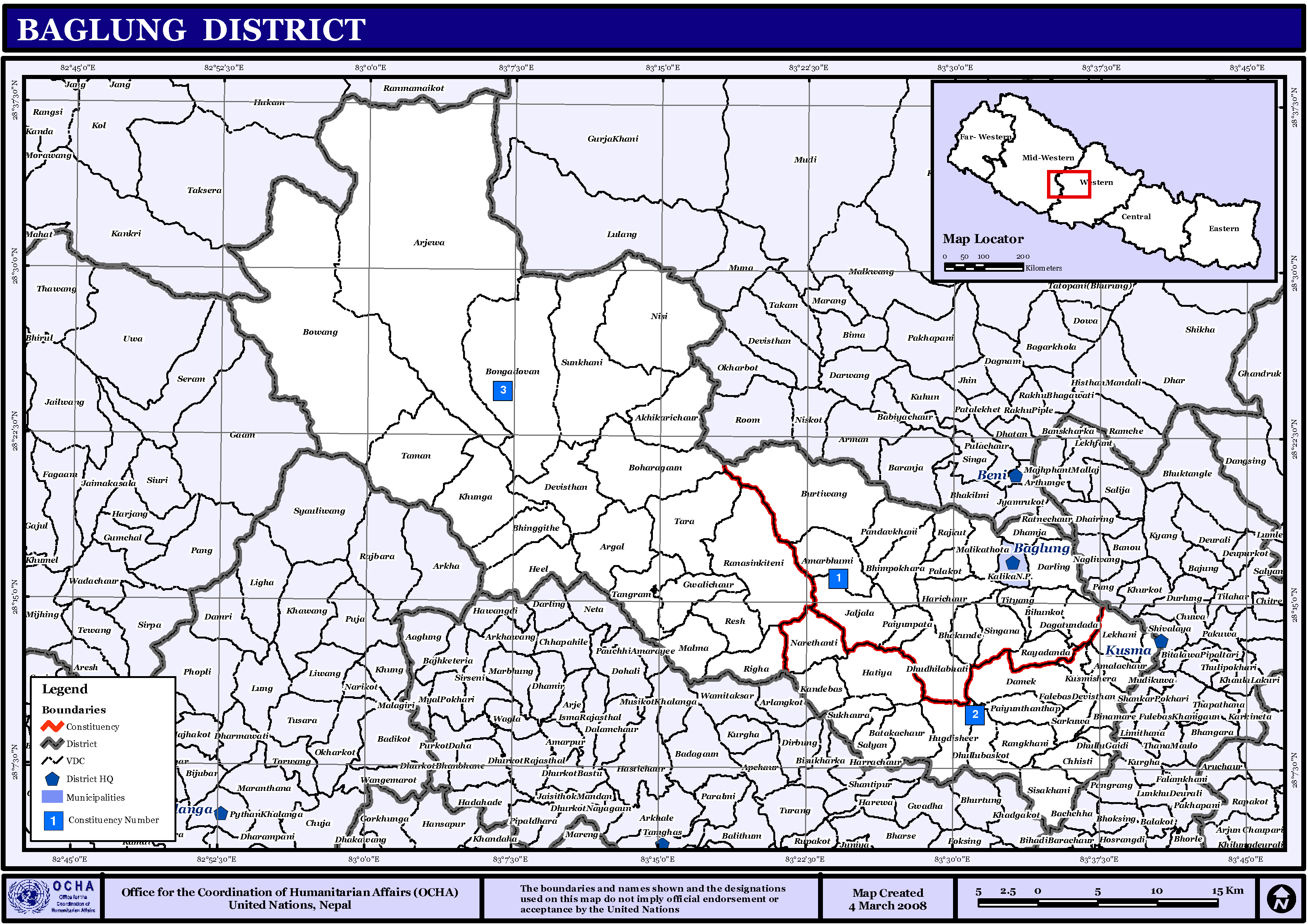
Baglung District

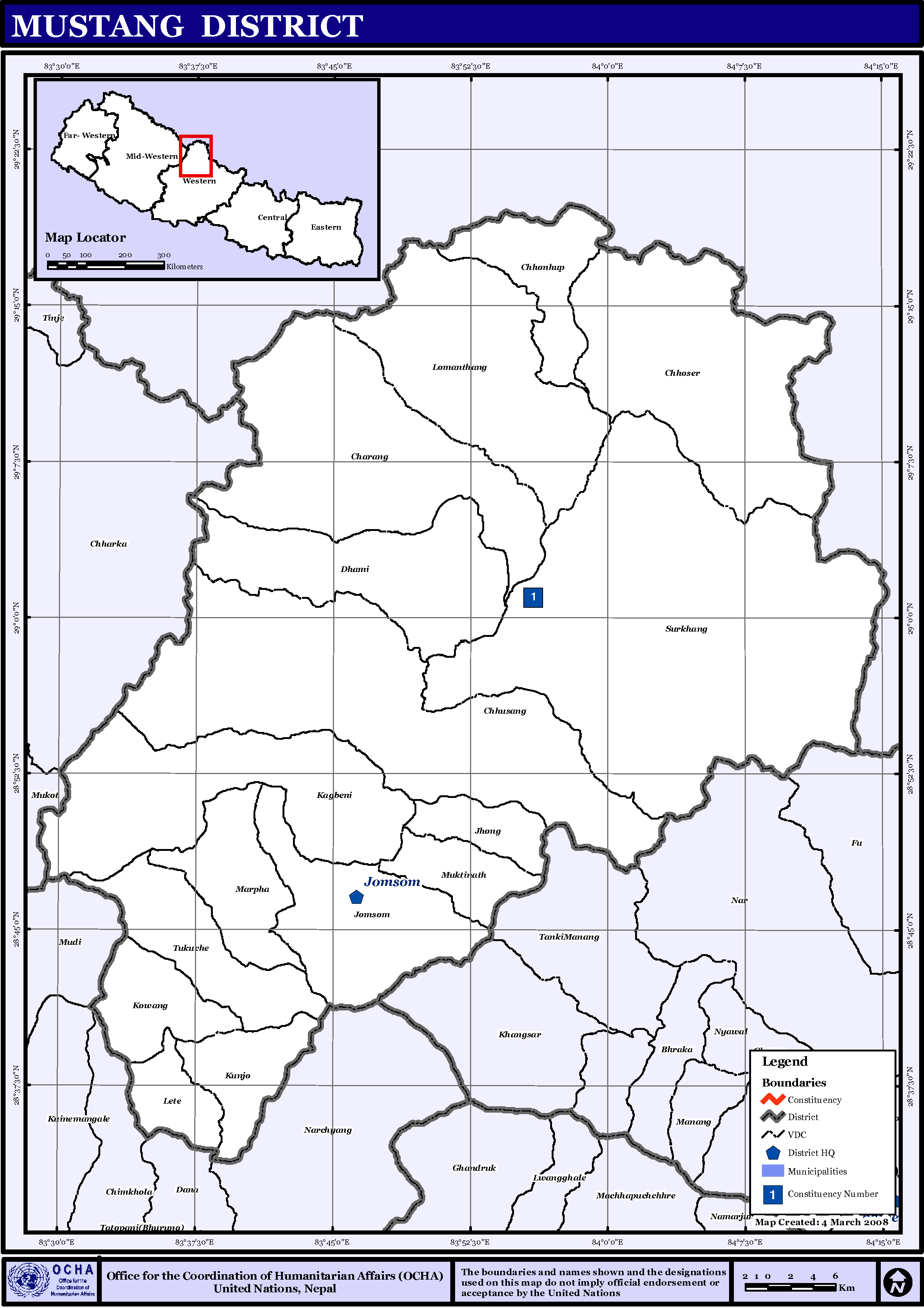
Mustang District

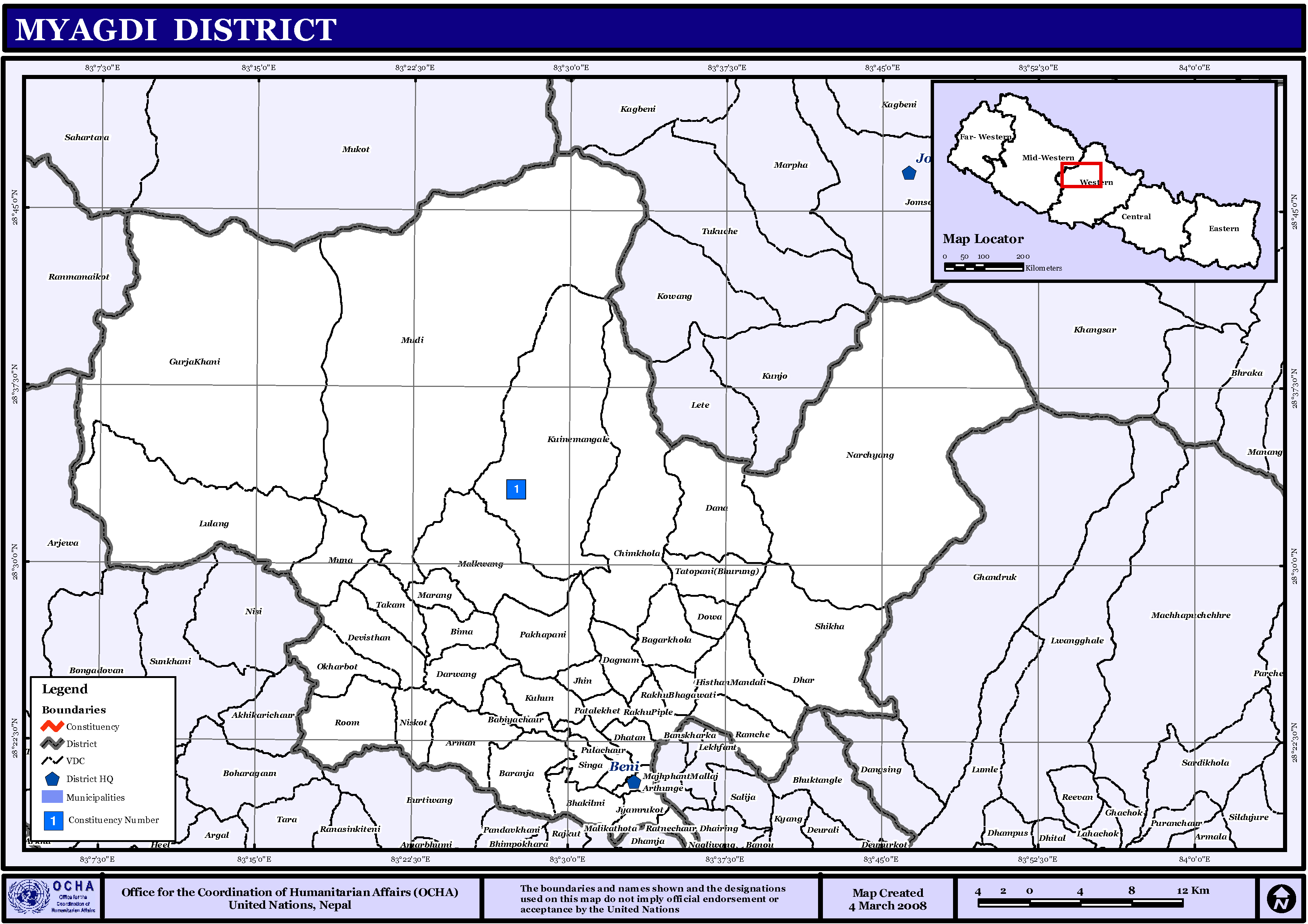
Myagdi District

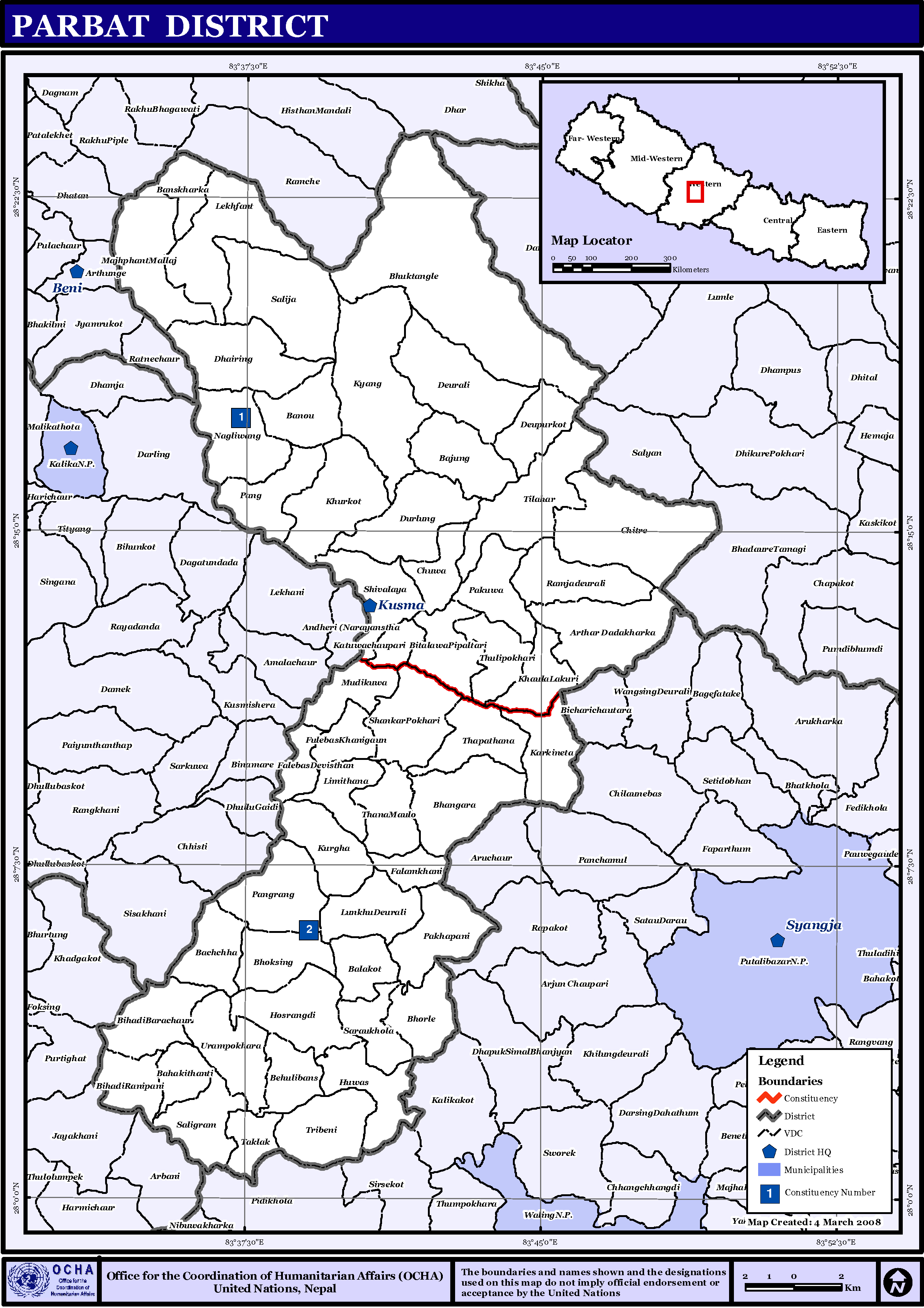
Parbat District

==== Baglung District ====
Adhikarichaur, Amalachaur, Amarbhumi, Argal, Arjewa, Baskot, Batakachaur, Bhakunde, Bhimgithe, Bhimpokhara, Bihunkot, Binamare, Boharagaun, Bowang, Bungadovan, Burtibang, Chhisti, Daga Tundada, Damek, Darling, Devisthan, Dhamja, Baglung Jaidi, Dhullubaskot, Dudilabhati, Gwalichaur-Harichaur, Hatiya, Hila, Hudgishir, Jaljala, Kandebas, Khungkhani, Khunga, Kusmishera, Lekhani, Malika, Malma, Mulpani, Narayansthan, Narethanti, Nisi, Paiyunthanthap, Palakot, Pandavkhani, Paiyunpata, Rajkut, Ranasingkiteni, Rangkhani, Rayadanda, Resha, Righa, Salyan, Sarkuwa, Singana, Sisakhani, Sukhura, Sunkhani, Taman, Tangram, Tara, Tityang

==== Mustang District ====
Charang, Chhonhup, Chhoser, Chhusang, Dhami, Jomsom, Jhong, Kagbeni, Kowang, Kunjo, Lete, Lo Manthang, Marpha, Muktinath, Surkhang, Tukuche

==== Myagdi District ====
Arman, Arthunge, Babiyachaur, Baranja, Begkhola, Bhakilmi, Bima, Chimkhola, Dagnam, Dana, Darwang, Devisthan, Dhatan, Dowa, Gurja Khani, Histhan Mandali, Jhin, Jyamrukot, Kuhunkot, Kuinemangale, Lulang, Malkwang, Marang, Mudi, Muna, Narchyang, Niskot, Okharbot, Pakhapani, Patlekhet, Pulachaur, Rakhu Bhagawati, Rakhupiple, Ramche, Ratnechaur, Rumaga, Shikha, Singa, Takam, Tatopani

==== Parbat District ====
Arthar Dadakharka, Bachchha, Bahaki Thanti, Bajung, Balakot, Banau, Baskharka, Behulibans, Bhangara, Bhoksing, Bhorle, Bhuk Deurali, Bhuktangle, Bihadi Barachaur, Bihadi Ranipani, Bitalawa Pipaltari, Chitre, Deupurkot, Deurali, Devisthan, Dhairing, Hosrangdi, Huwas, Karkineta, Khola Lakuri, Kurgha, Kyang, Lekhphant, Limithana, Mahashila Gaupalika, Mallaj Majhfant, Mudikuwa, Nagliwang, Pakhapani, Pangrang, Phalamkhani, Phalebas Devisthan, Phalebas Khanigaun, Ramja Deurali, Saligram, Salija, Saraukhola, Shankar Pokhari, Taklak, Tanglekot, Thana Maulo, Thapathana, Thuli Pokhari, Tilahar, Tribeni, Urampokharapakuwa

== Mid-Western Development Region ==
=== Rapti Zone ===
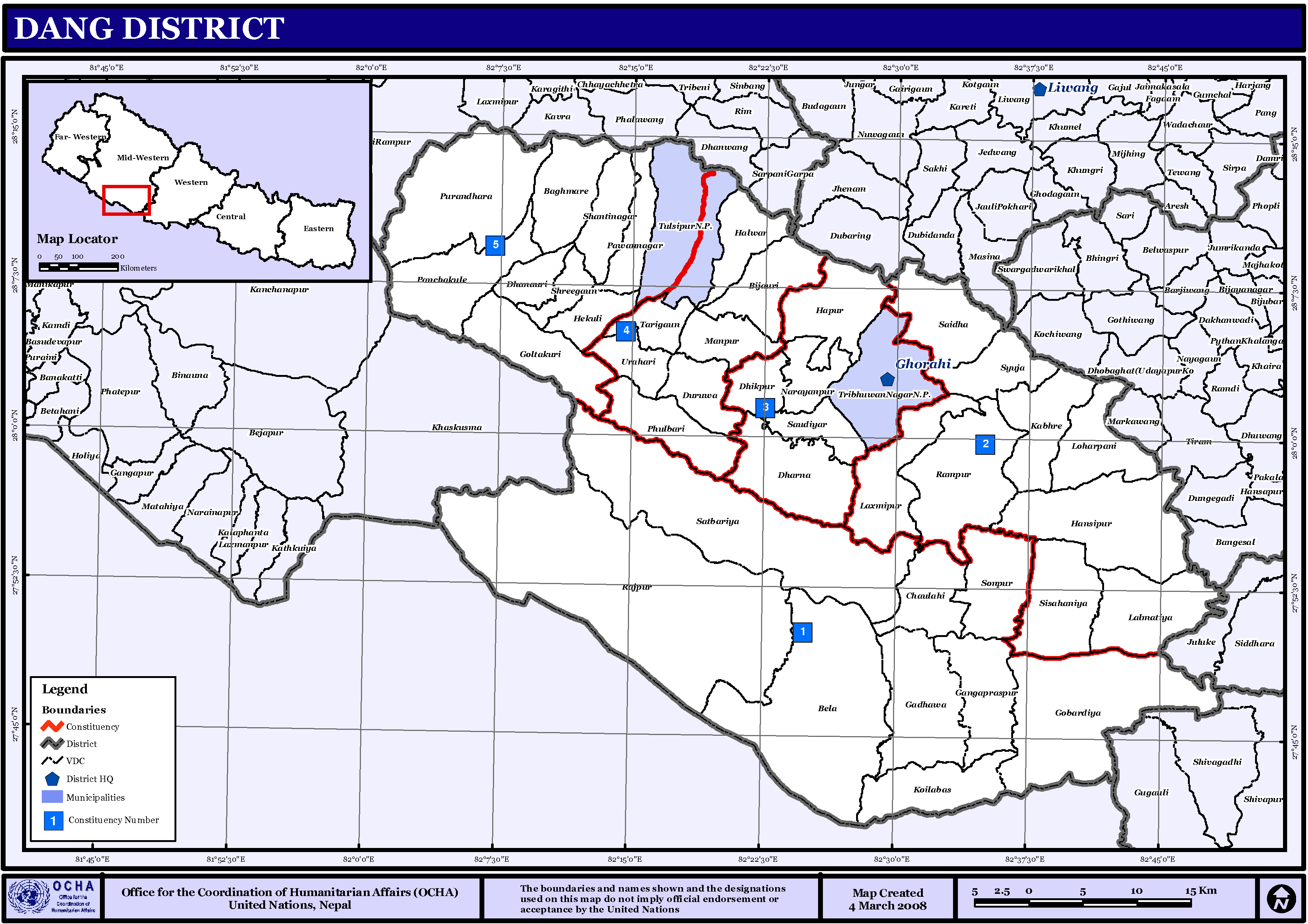
Dang Deukhuri District

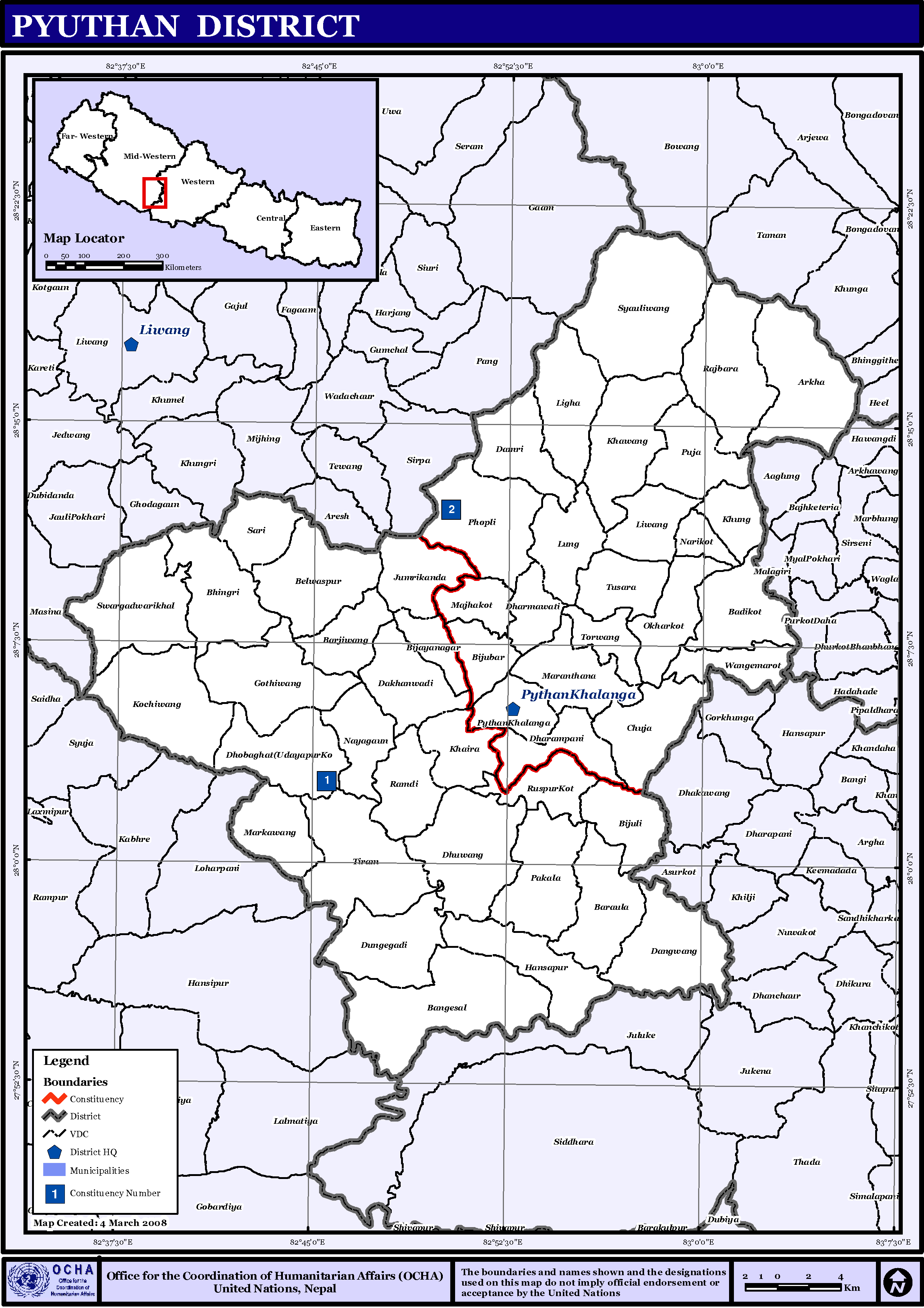
Pyuthan District

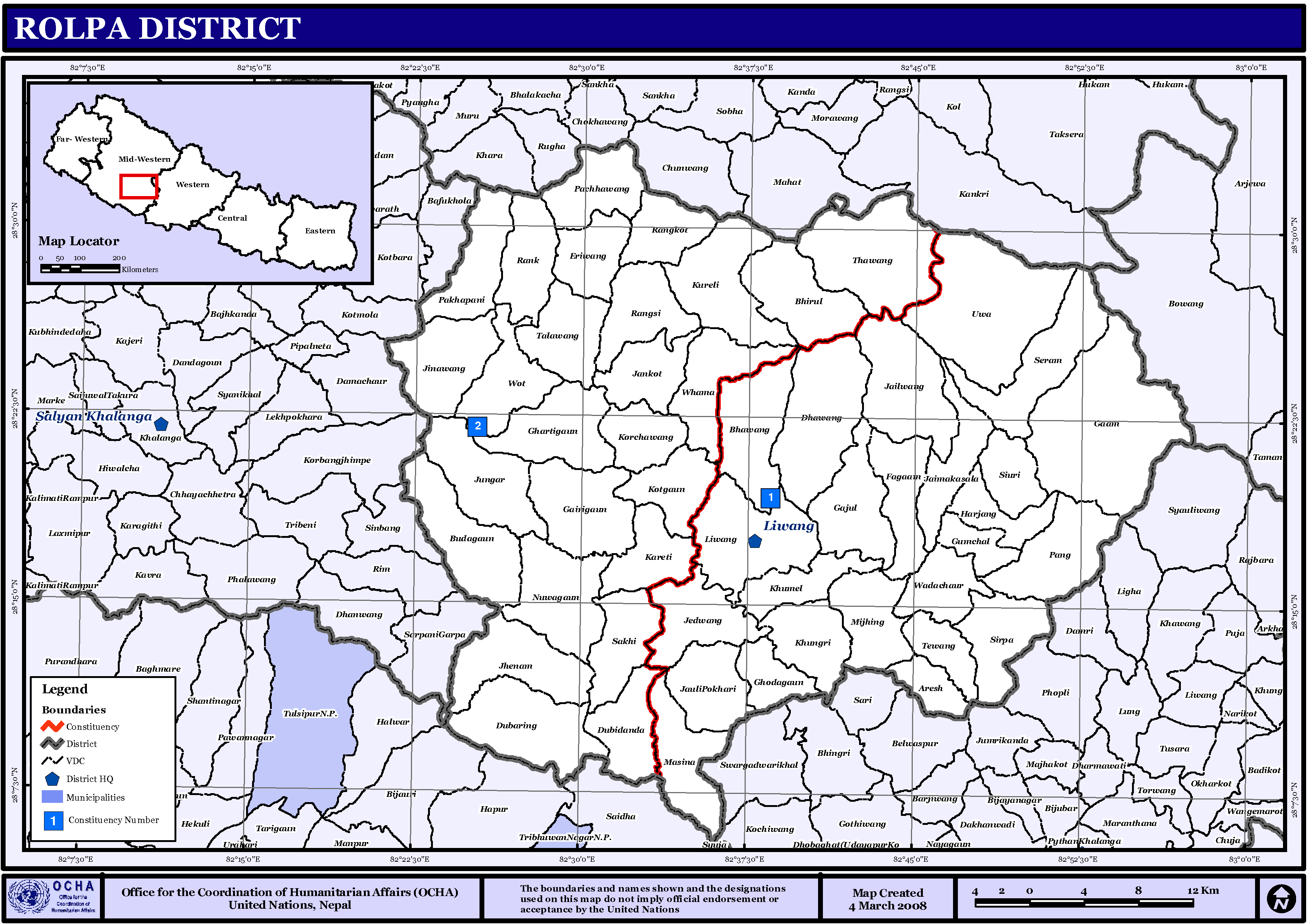
Rolpa District

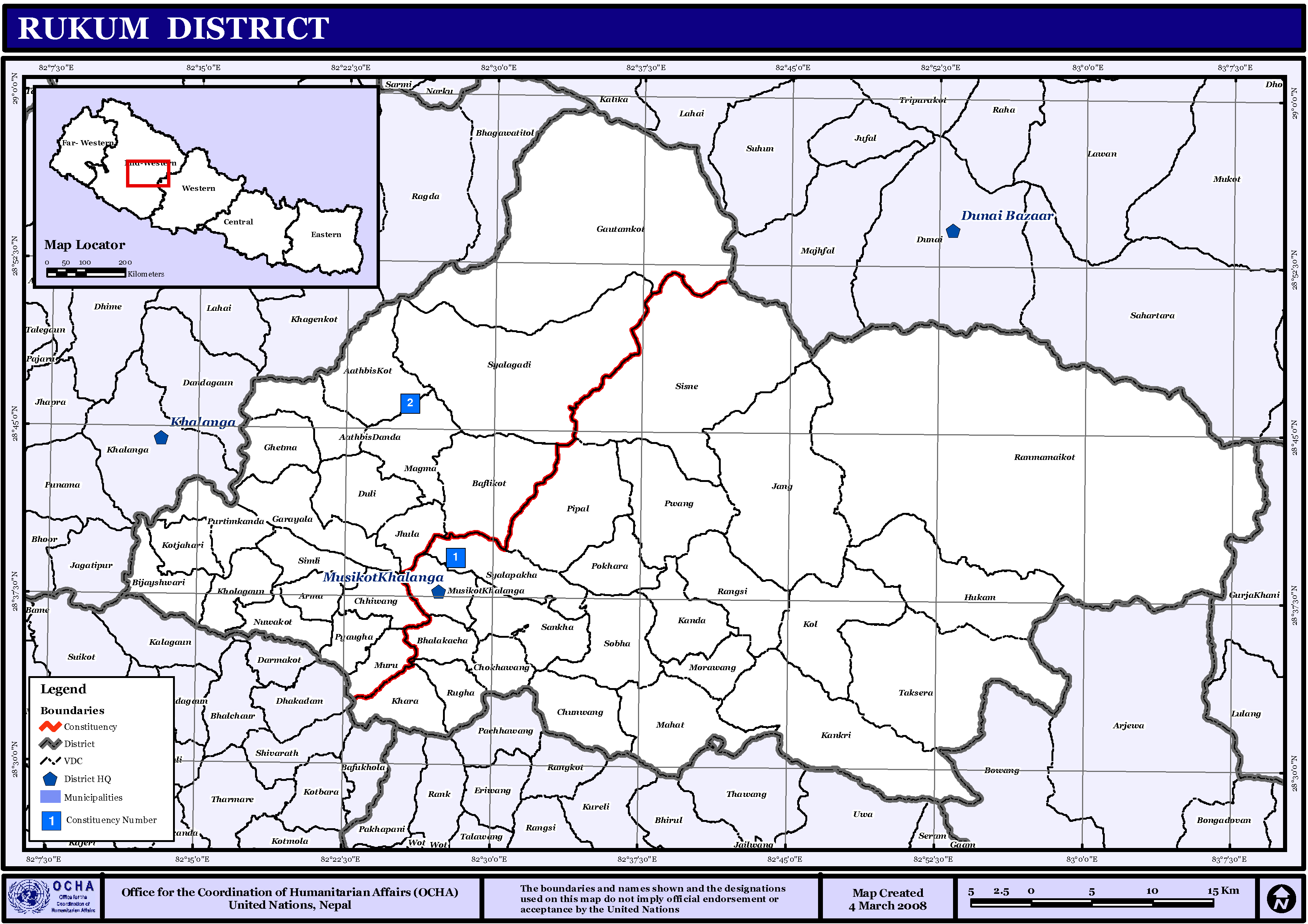
Rukum District

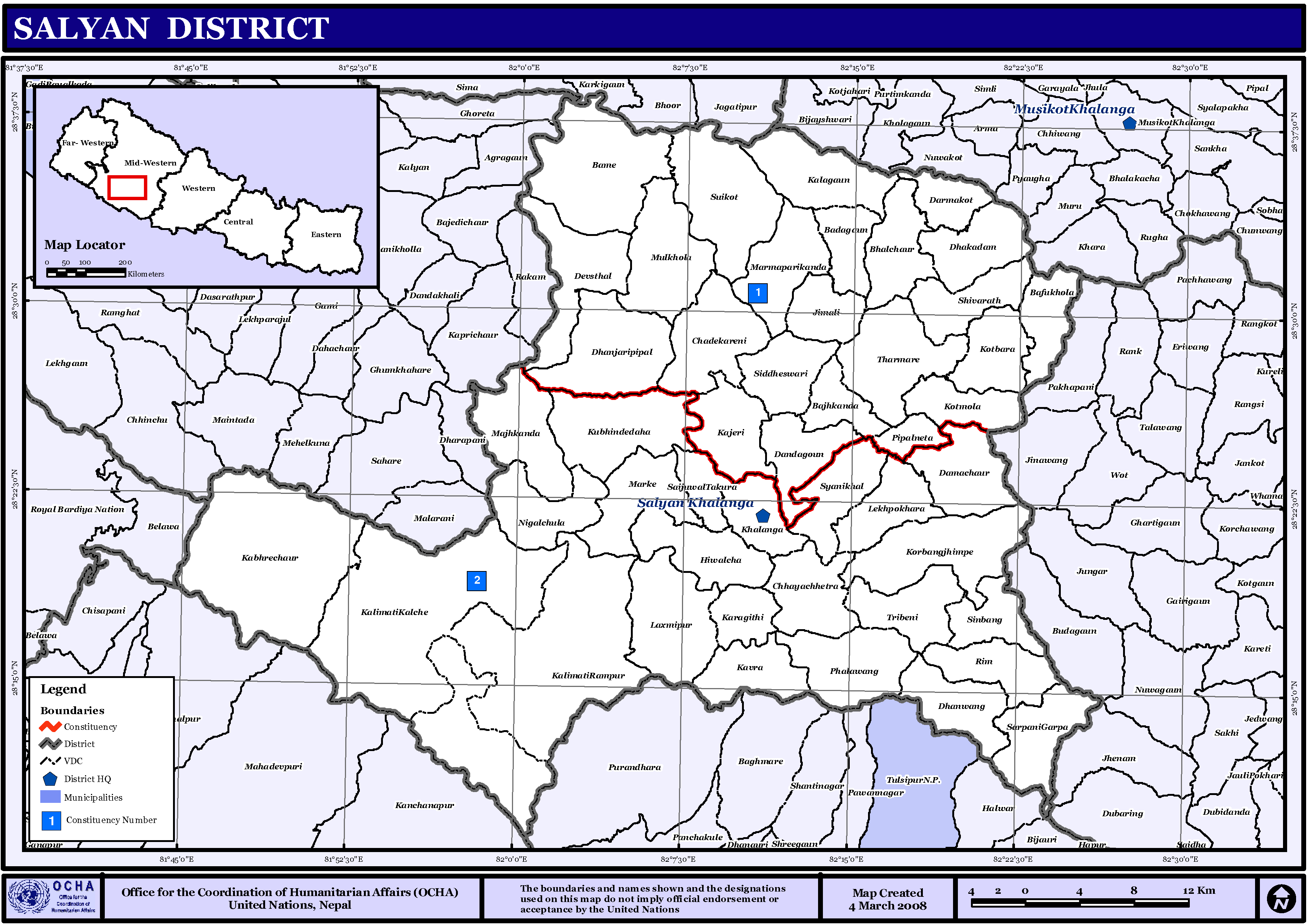
Salyan District

==== Dang Deukhuri District ====
Amritpur, Baghmare, Bela, Bijauri, Chailahi, Dhanauri, Dharna, Dhikpur, Diruwa, Gadhawa, Gangapraspur, Gobardiya, Goltakuri, Halwar, Hansipur, Hapur, Hekuli, Kabhre, Koilabas, Lalmitiya, Lakshmipur, Loharpani, Manpur, Narayanpur, Panchakule, Pawan Nagar, Phulbari, Purandhara, Rajpur, Rampur, Saidha, Satbariya, Saudiyar, Shantinagar, Srigaun, Sisahaniya, Sonpur, Syuja, Tarigaun, Urahari

==== Pyuthan District ====
Arkha, Badikot, Bangemarkot, Bangesal, Baraula, Barjibang, Belbas, Bhingri, Bijaya Nagar, Bijuwar, Bijuli, Chuja, Dakhanwadi, Damri, Dangbang, Dharamawati, Dharampani, Dhobaghat, Dhubang, Dungegadi, Gothibang, Hansapur, Jumrikanda, Khaira, Khabang, Khung, Kochibang, Ligha, Libang, Lung, Majhakot, Maranthana, Markabang, Narikot, Naya Gaun, Okharkot, Pakala, Phopli, Puja, Pythan, Rajbara, Ramdi, Ruspur Kot, Sari, Swargadwarikhal, Syaulibang, Tarwang, Tiram, TusaraNineukharka

==== Rolpa District ====
Aresh, Bhawang, Mirul, Budagaun, Dhawang, Dubidanda, Dubring, Eriwang, Phagam, Gam, Gajul, Gaurigaun, Gharti Gaun, Ghodagaun, Gumchal, Harjang, Jailwang, Jaimakasala, Jankot, Jauli Pokhari, Jedwang, Jhenam, Jinawang, Jungar, Karchawang, Kareti, Khumel, Khungri, Kotgaun, Kureli, Liwang, Masina, Mijhing, Nuwagaun, Pachhawang, Pakhapani, Pang, Rangkot, Rangsi, Rank, Sakhi, Seram, Sirpa, Siuri, Talawang, Tewang, Thawang, Uwa, Wadachaur, Whama, Wot

==== Rukum District ====
Aathbis Danda, Aathbis Kot, Arma, Bapsekot, Bhalakachha, Chaurjahari, Chhiwang, Chokhawang, Chunwang, Duli, Garayala, Gautamkot, Ghetma, Hukam, Jang, Jhula, Kanda, Kankri, Khara, Kholagaun, Kol, Kotjahari, Magma, Mahat, Morawang, Muru, Musikot Khalanga, Nuwakot, Pipal, Pokhara, Purtim Kanda, Pwang, Pyaugha, Rangsi, Ranmamekot, Rugha, Simli, Sisne, Sobha, Syalagadi, Syalapakha, Taksera

==== Salyan District ====
Badagaun, Baphukhola, Bajh Kanda, Bame Banghad, Bhalchaur, Chande, Chhayachhetra, Damachaur, Darmakot, Devisthal, Dhagari Pipal, Dhakadam, Dhanwang, Jhimpe, Jimali, Kabhrechaur, Kalagaun, Kalimati Kalche, Kalimati Rampur, Kabhra, Korbang Jhimpe, Kotbara, Kotmala, Kubhinde, Lakshmipur, Lekhpokhara, Majh Khanda, Marmaparikhanda, Mulkhola, Nigalchula, Phalawang, Pipal Neta, Rim, Sarpani Garpa, Sibaratha, Siddheshwar, Sinwang, Suikot, Tharmare, Tribeni

=== Karnali Zone ===
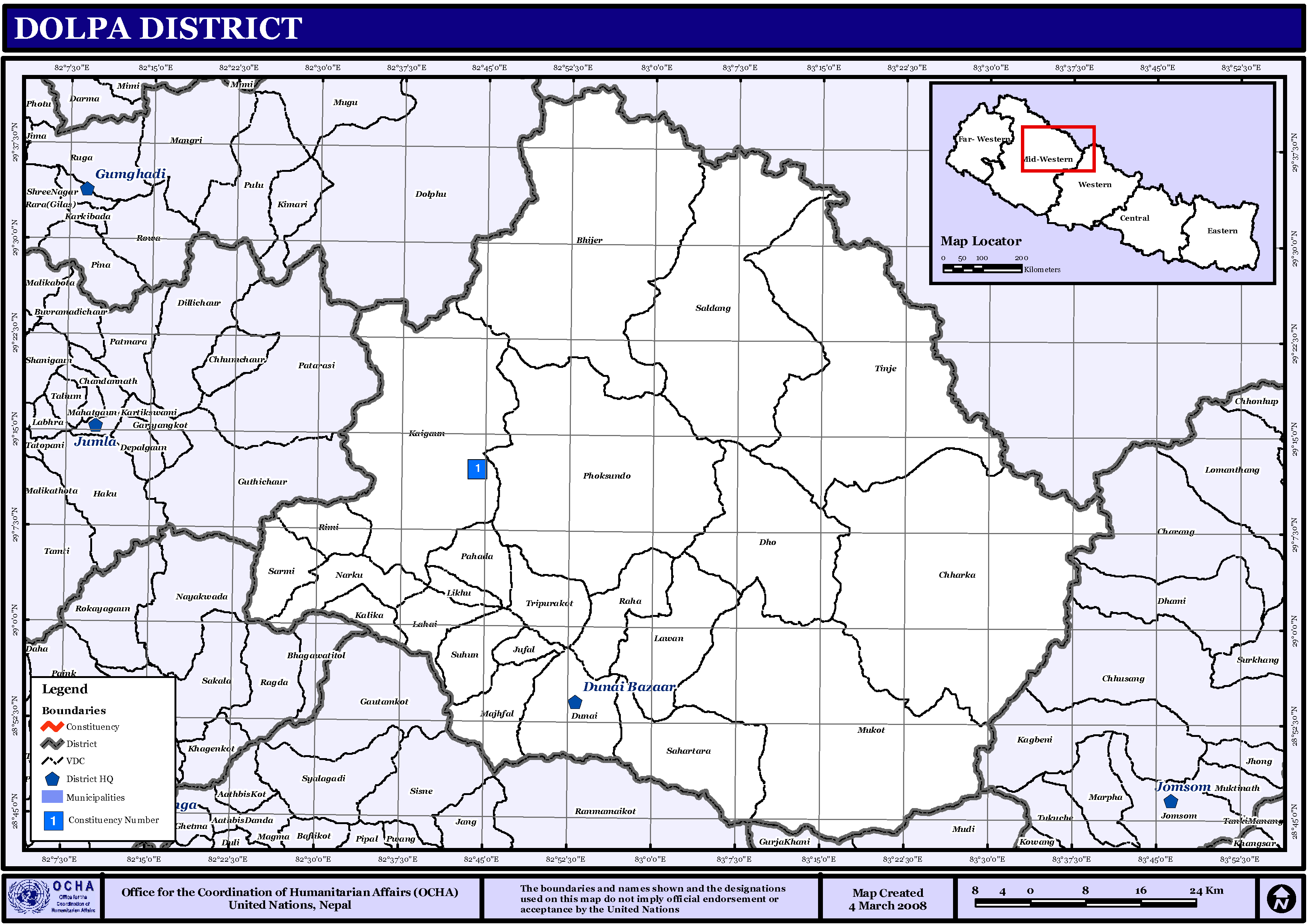
Dolpa District

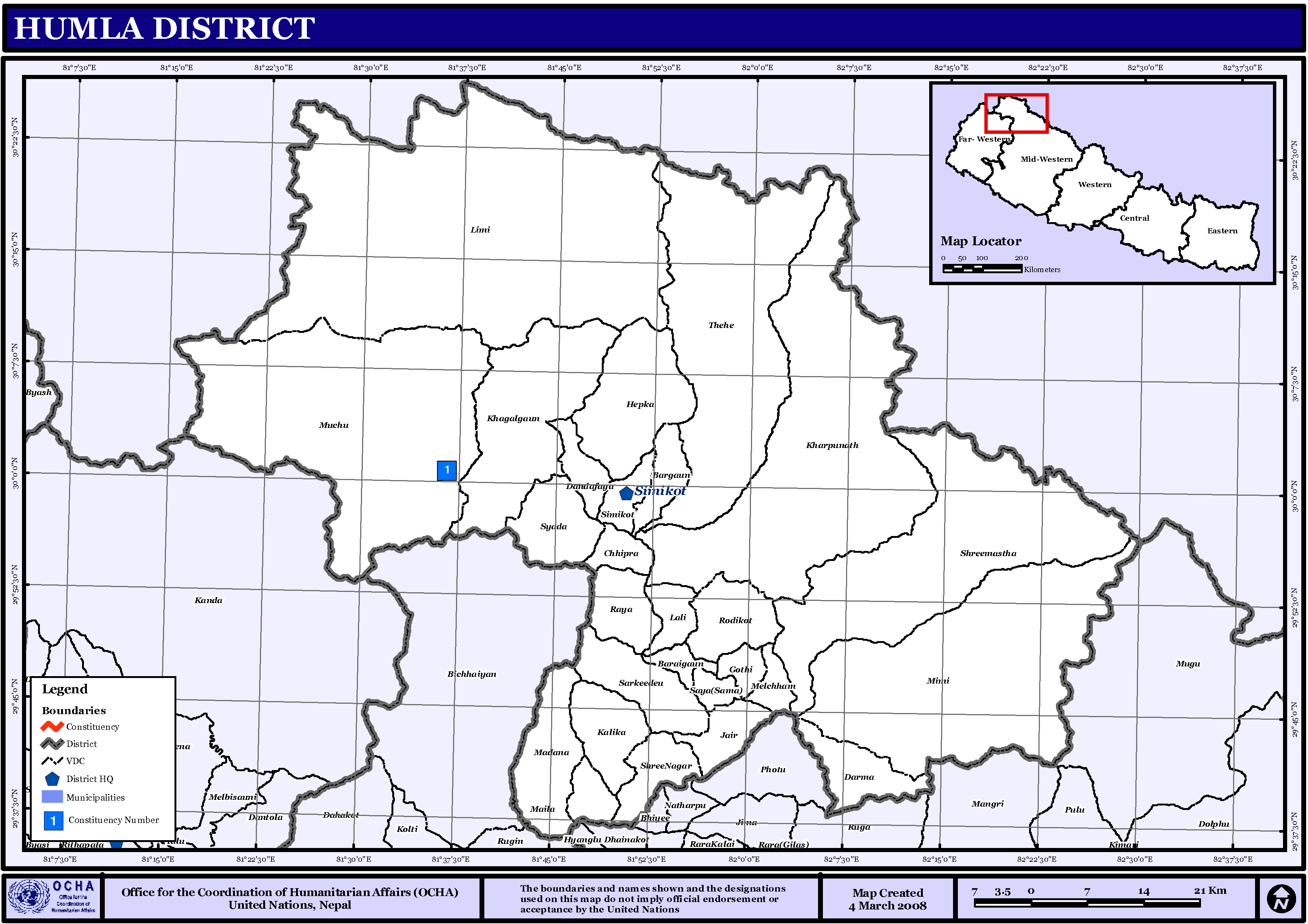
Humla District

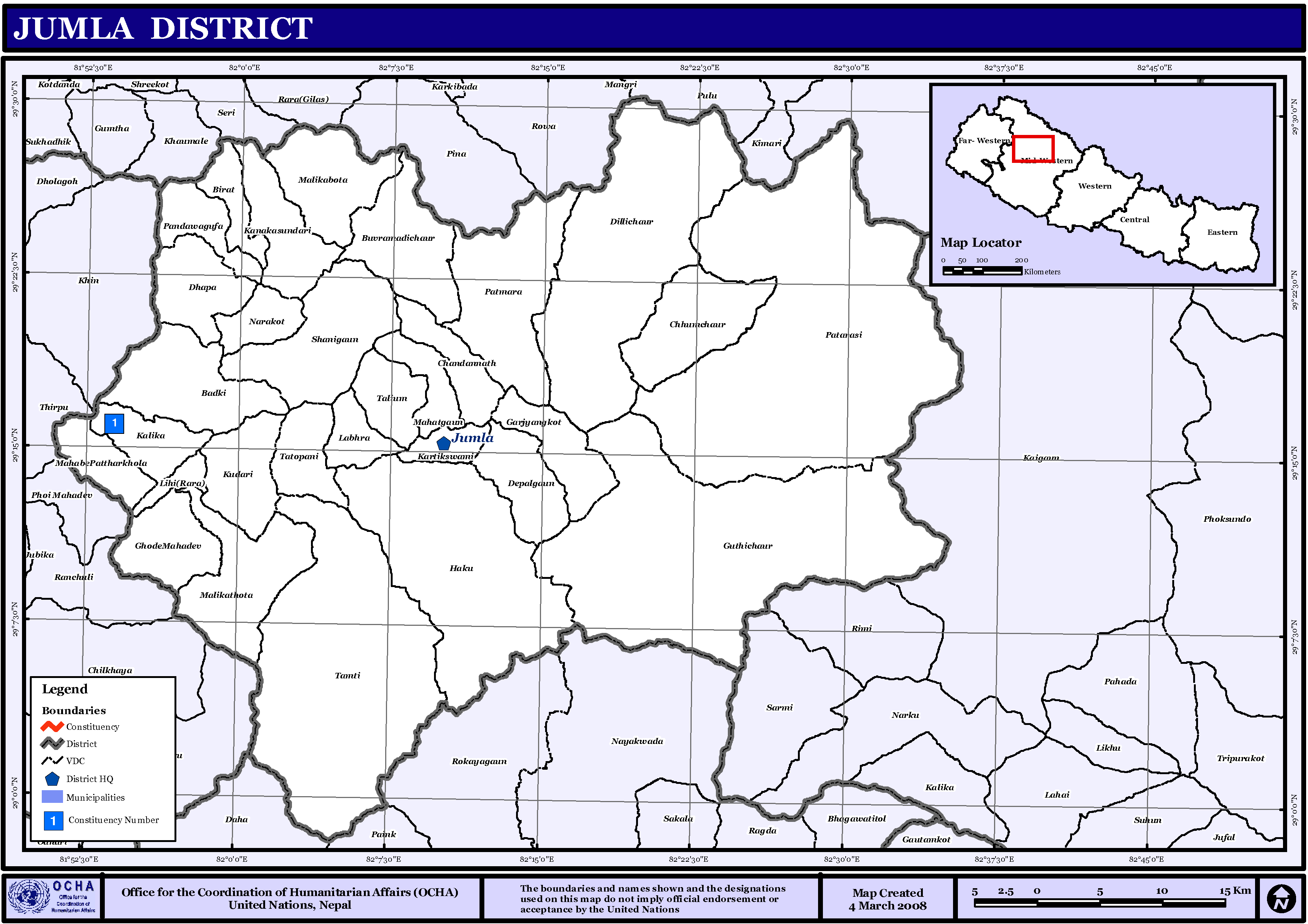
Jumla District

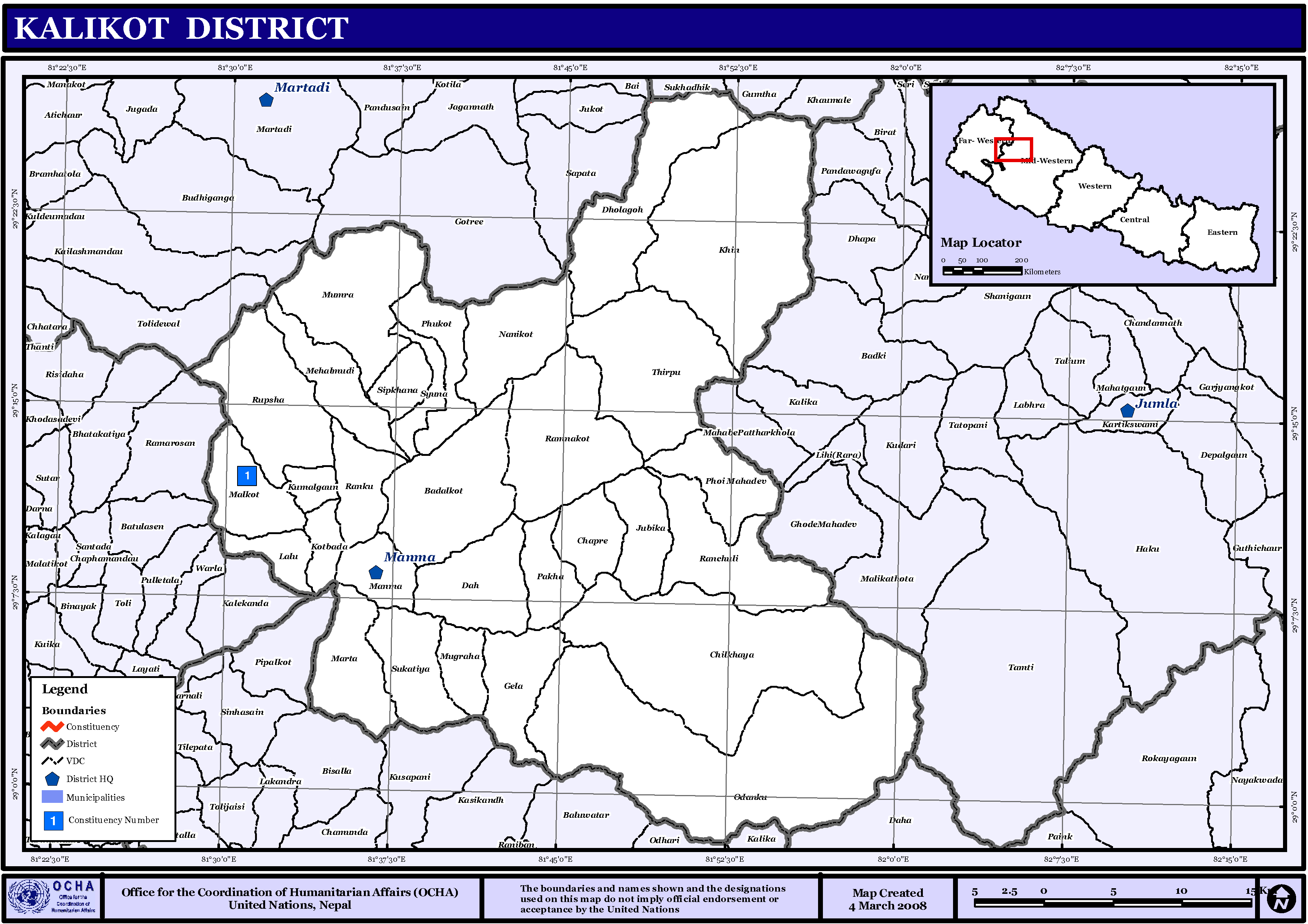
Kalikot District

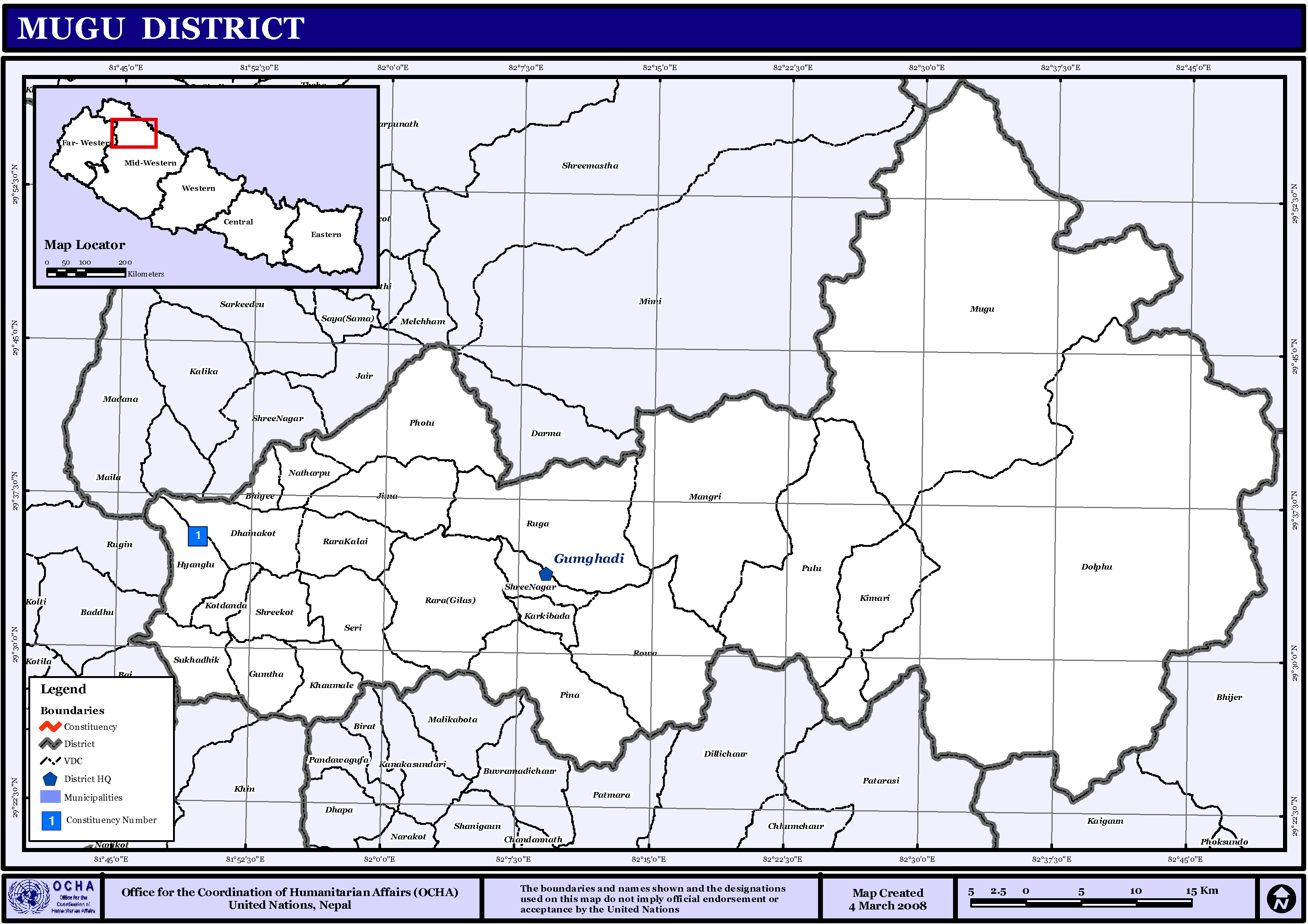
Mugu District

==== Dolpa District ====
Bhijer, Chharka, Dho, Dunai, Juphal, Kaigaun, Kalika, Khadang, Lawan, Likhu, Majhphal, Mukot, Narku, Pahada, Phoksundo, Raha, Rimi, Sahartara, Saldang, Sarmi, Sunhu, Tinje, Tripurakot

==== Humla District ====
Barai, Bargaun, Chhipra, Darma, Dandaphaya, Gothi, Hepka, Jaira, Kalika, Khagalgaun, Kharpunath, Lali, Limi, Madana, Maila, Melchham, Mimi, Muchu, Raya, Rodikot, Sarkideu, Saya, Srinagar, Srimastha, Simikot, Syada, Thehe,

==== Jumla District ====
Badki, Birat, Bamramadichaur, Chhumchaur, Depalgaun, Dhapa, Dillichaur, Garjyangkot, Ghode Mahadev, Gothichaur, Haku, Kalikakhetu, Kanakasundari, Labhra, Lihi, Mahabe Pattharkhola, Mahadev, Malika Bota, Malikathota, Narakot, Pandawagupha, Patarasi, Patmara, Sanigaun, Tamti, Tatopani

==== Kalikot District ====
Badalkot, Chhapre, Chilkhaya, Daha, Dholagohe, Gela, Jubika, Khin, Kotbada, Kumalgaun, Lalu, Marta, Mehal Madi, Mugraha, Mumra, Nanikot, Odanku, Pakha, Phoi Mahadev, Phukot, Raku, Ramanakot, Ranchuli, Rupsa, Sipkhana, Siuna, Sukitaya, Thirpu

==== Mugu District ====
Bhiyi, Dhainakot, Dolphu, Ghaina, Gumtha, Hyanglung, Jima, Kale, Karkibada, Kimari, Kotdanda, Mangri, Mihi, Mugu, Natharpu, Photu, Pina, Pulu, Rara, Rara Kalai, Rowa, Ruga, Rumale, Seri, Srikot, Srinagar, Sukhadhik

=== Bheri Zone ===
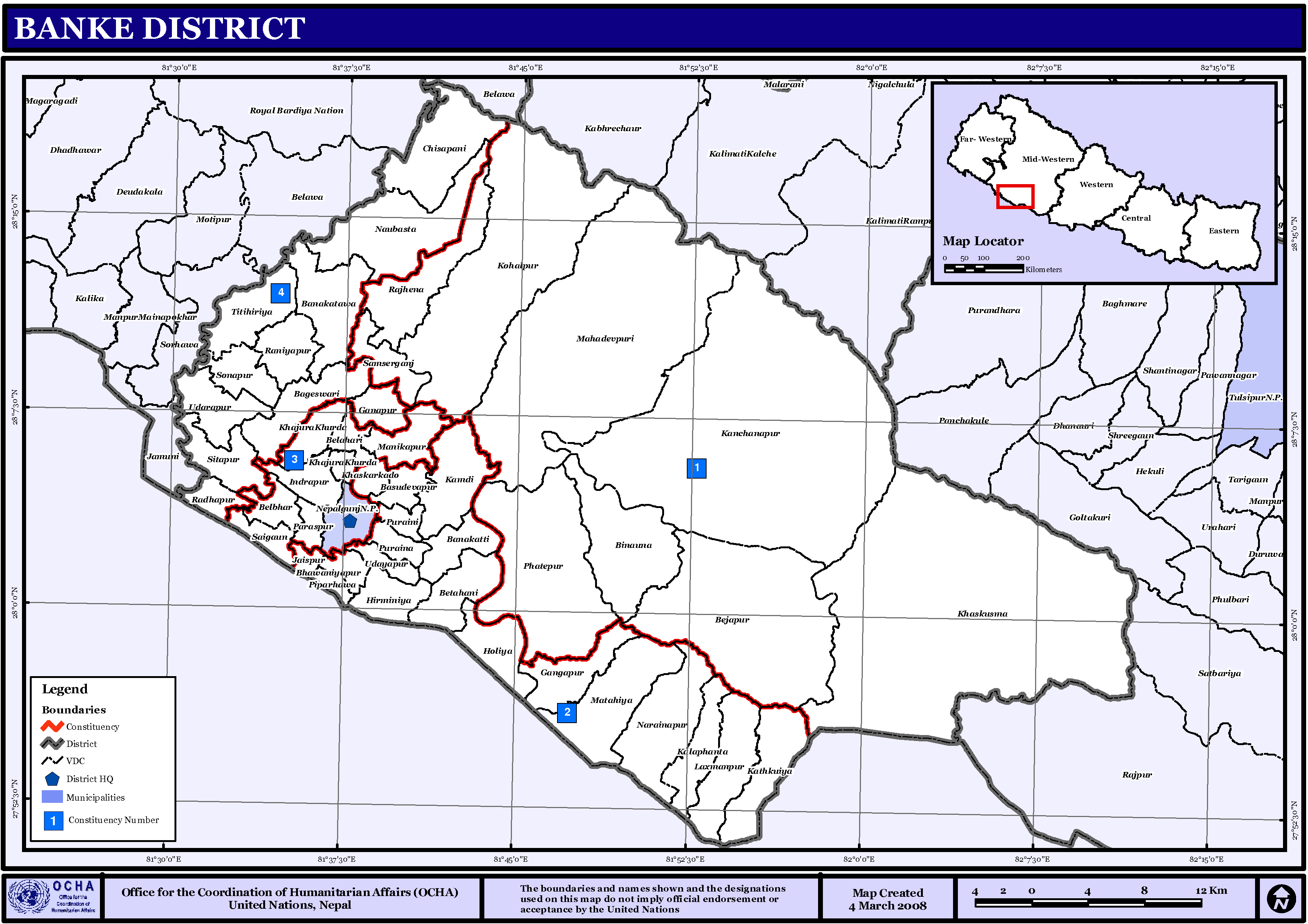
Banke District

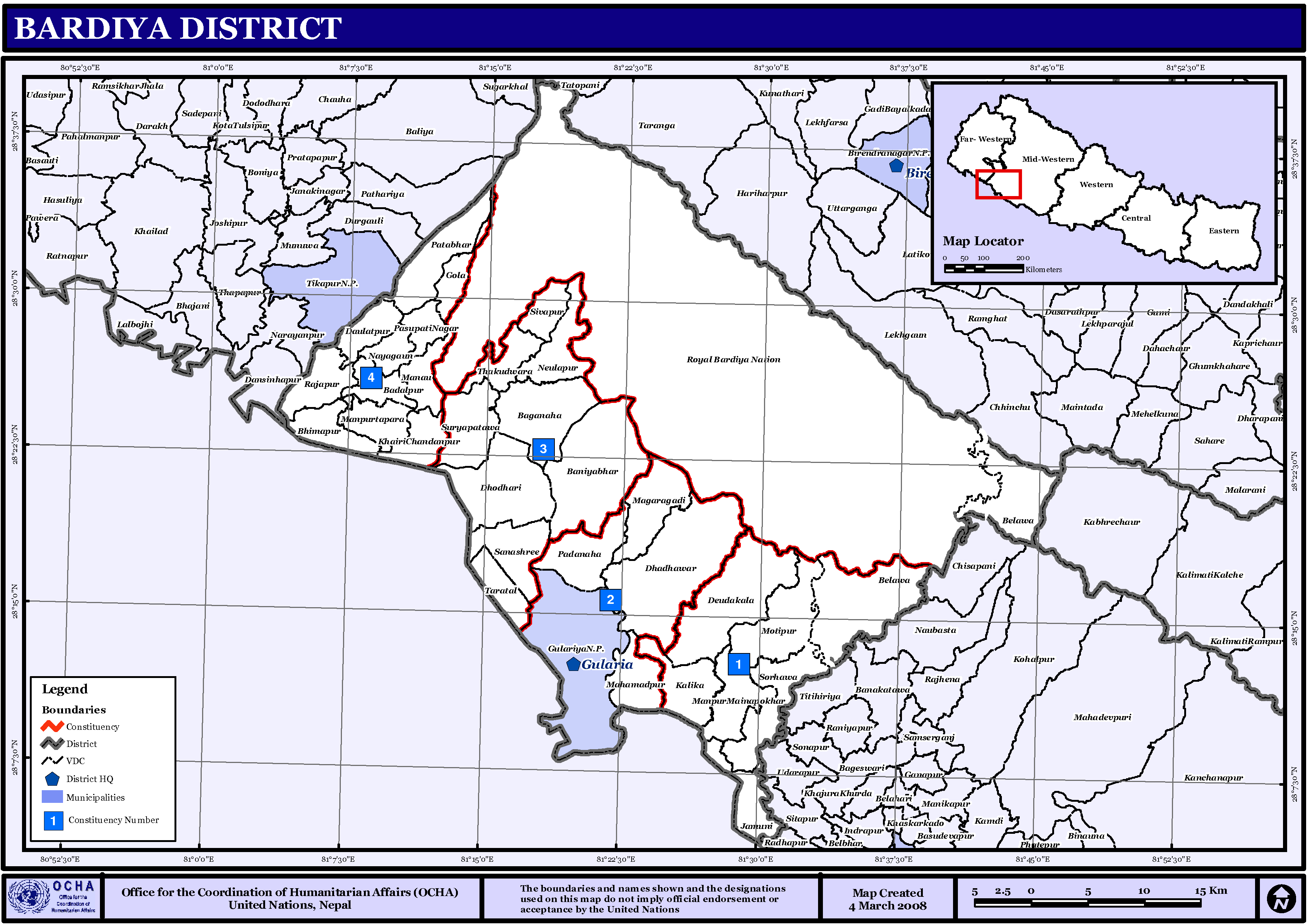
Bardiya District

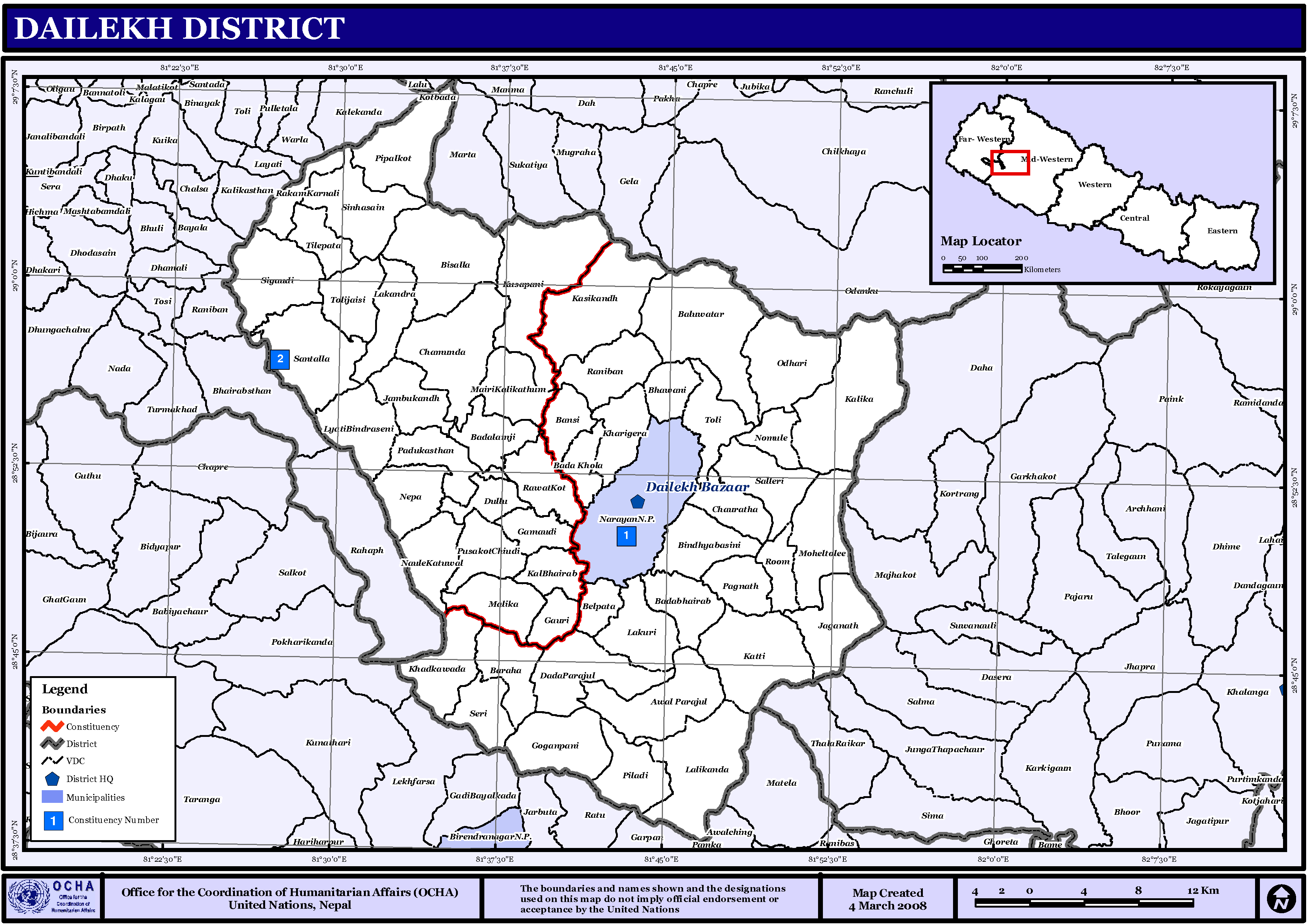
Dailekh District

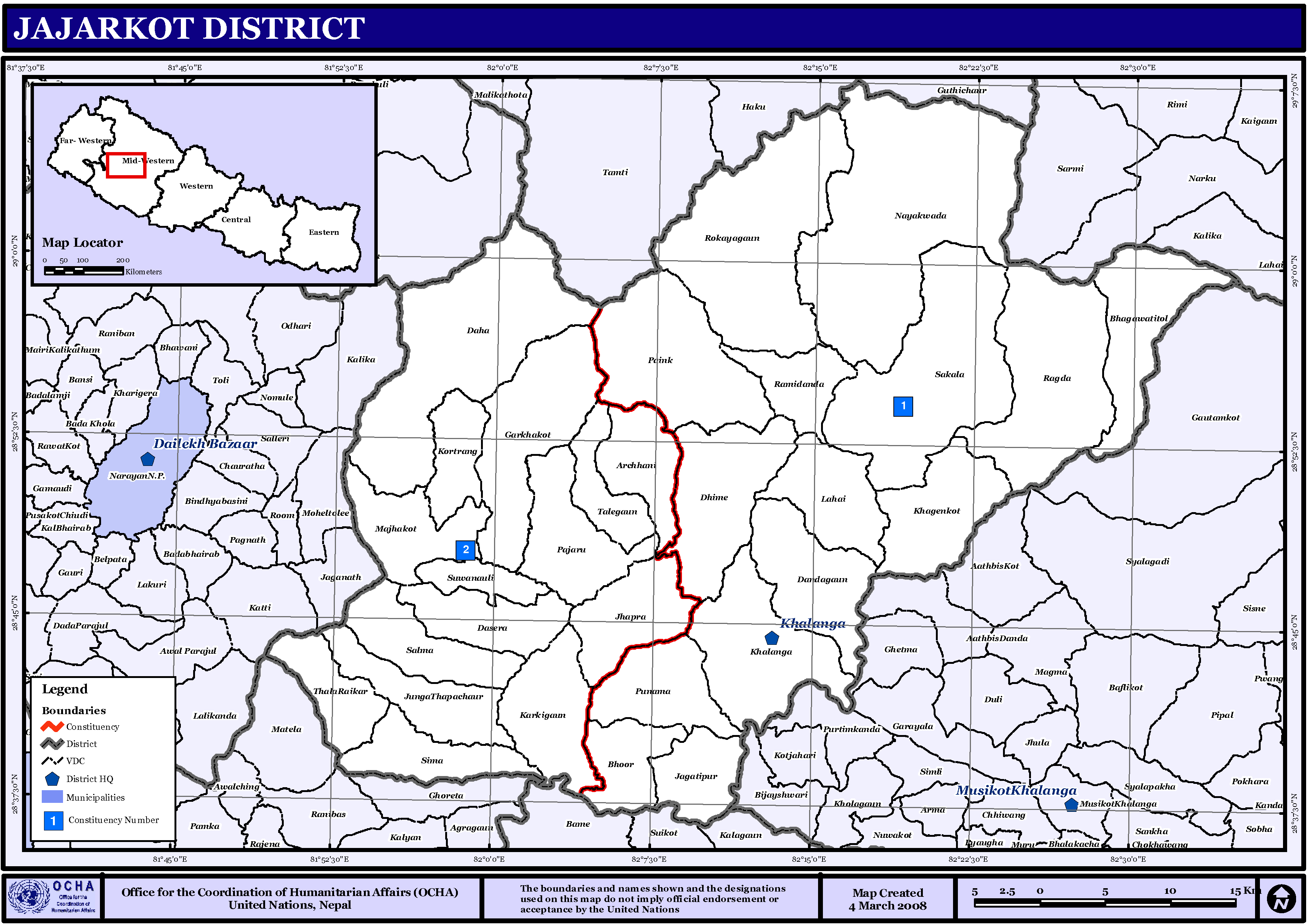
Jajarkot District

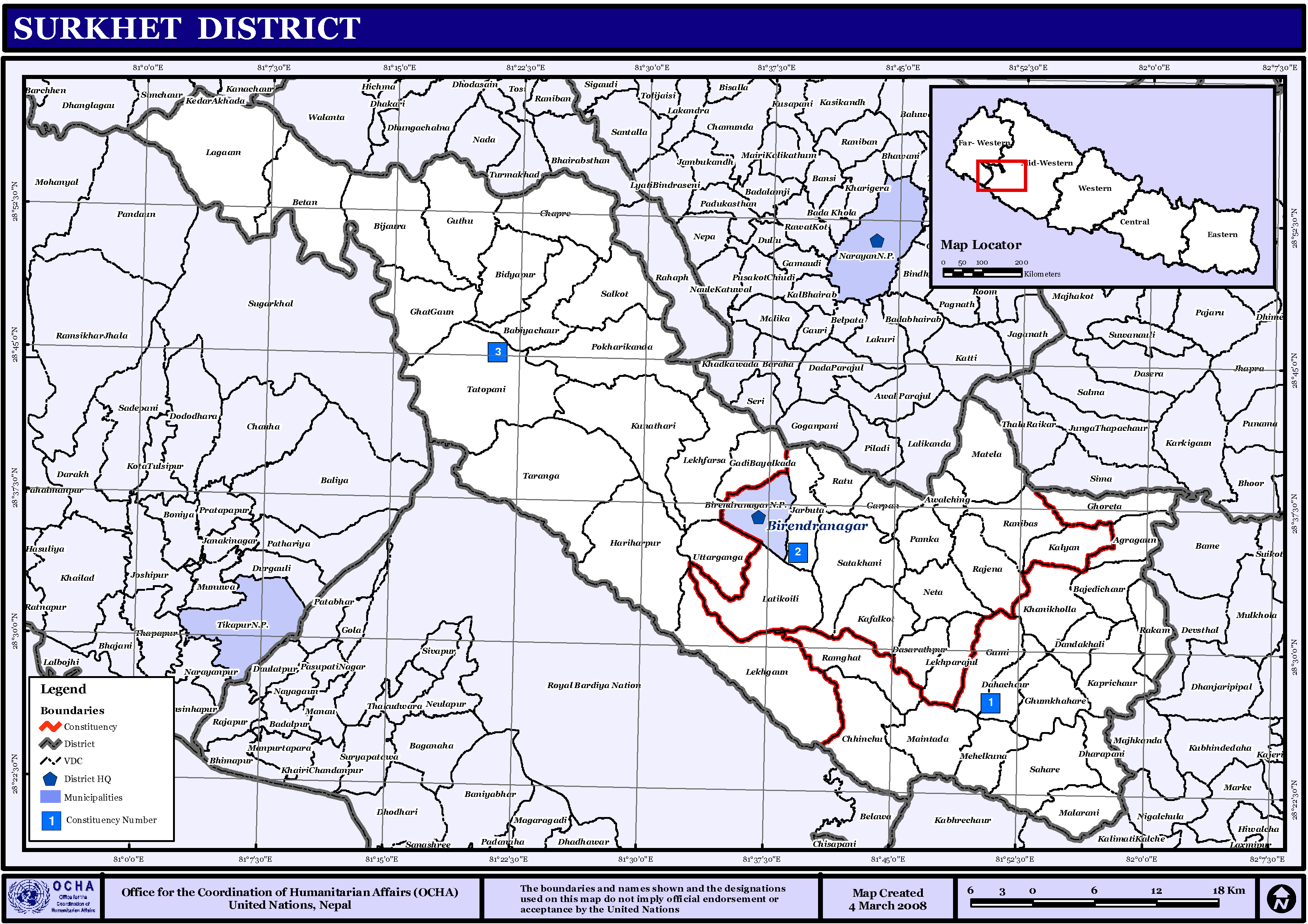
Surkhet District

==== Banke District ====
Bageshwari, Banakatawa, Banakatti, Basudevapur, Bejapur, Belahari, Belbhar, Betahani, Bhawaniyapur, Binauna, Chisapani, Ganapur, Gangapur, Hirminiya, Holiya, Indrapur, Jaispur, Kalaphanta, Kamdi, Kanchanpur, Kathkuiya, Khajura Khurda, Khaskarkando, Khaskusma, Lakshmanpur, Mahadevpuri, Manikapur, Matahiya, Narainapur, Naubasta, Parsapur, Phattepur, Piparhawa, Puraina, Puraini, Radhapur, Rajhena, Raniyapur, Saigaun, Samserganj, Sitapur, Sonapur, Titahiriya, Udarapur, Udayapur

==== Bardiya District ====
Baganaha, Baniyabhar, Belawa, Deudakala, Dhadhawar, Dhodhari, Gola, Jamuni, Kalika, Khairapur, Khairi Chandanpur, Magaragadi, Mahamadpur, Manau, Manpur Mainapokhar, Manpur Tapara, Mathurahardwar, Motipur, Neulapur, Padanaha, Pashupatinagar, Patabhar, Sanesri, Shivapur, Sorhawa, Suryapatawa, Taratal, Thakudwara

==== Dailekh District ====
Awal Parajul, Bada Bhairab, Bada Khola, Baluwatar, Bansi, Baraha, Basantamala, Belaspur, Belpata, Bhawani, Bindhyabasini, Bisalla, Chamunda, Chauratha, Dada Parajul, Gamaudi, Gauri, Goganpani, Jagannath, Jambukandh, Kal Bhairab, Kalika, Kasikandh, Katti, Khadkawada, Kharigera, Kusapani, Lakhandra, Lakuri, Lalikhanda, Lyati Bindraseni, Mairi Kalikathum, Malika, Moheltoli, Nomule, Odhari, Pagnath, Piladi, Pipalkot, Rakam Karnali, Raniban, Rawalkot, Rum, Salleri, Santalla, Saraswati, Seri, Sigaudi, Singasain, Tilepata, Tilijaisi, Toli

==== Jajarkot District ====
Archhani, Bhagawati Tol, Bhur, Daha, Dandagaun, Dasera, Dhime, Garkhakot, Jagatipur, Jhapra, Junga Thapachaur, Karkigaun, Khagenkot, Khalanga, Kortrang, Lahai, Majhkot, Nayakwada, Paink, Pajaru, Punama, Ragda, Ramidanda, Rokayagaun, Sakala, Salma, Sima, Suwanauli, Talegaun, Thala Raikar

==== Surkhet District ====
Agragaun, Awalaching, Bajedichaur, Betan, Bidyapur, Bijaura, Chapre, Chhinchu, Dabiyachaur, Dahachaur, Dandakhali, Dasarathpur, Dharapani, Gadi Bayalkada, Garpan, Ghatgaun, Ghoreta, Ghumkhahare, Gumi, Guthu, Hariharpur, Jarbuta, Kaphalkot, Kalyan, Kaprichaur, Khanikhola, Kunathari, Lagam, Latikoili, Lekhpharsa, Lekhgaun, Lekhparajul, Maintada, Malarani, Matela, Mehelkuna, Neta, Pamka, Pokharikanda, Rajeni, Rakam, Ramghat, Ranibas, Ratu, Sahare, Salkot, Satokhani, Taranga, Tatopani, Uttarganga

== Far-Western Development Region ==
=== Seti Zone ===
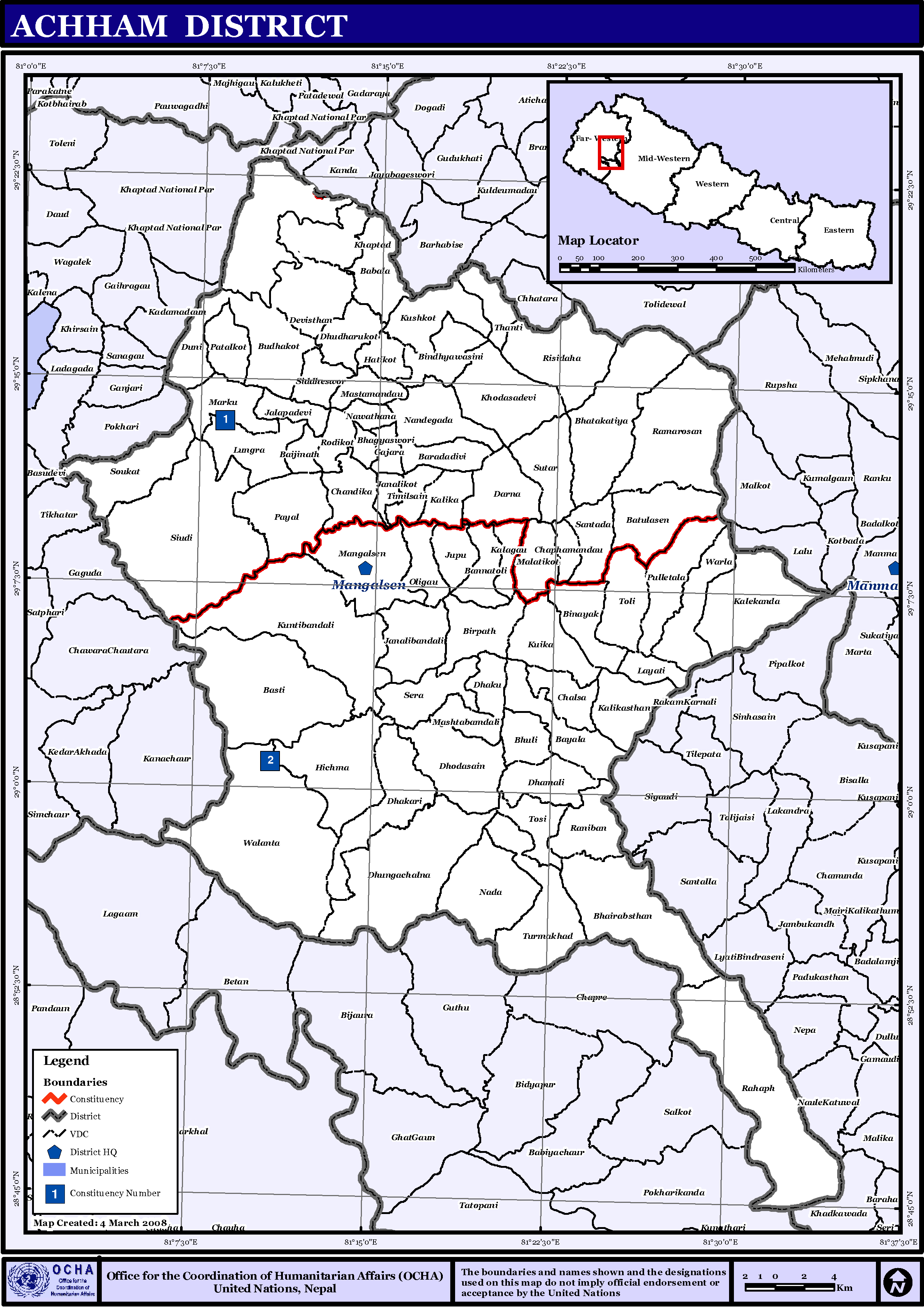
Achham District

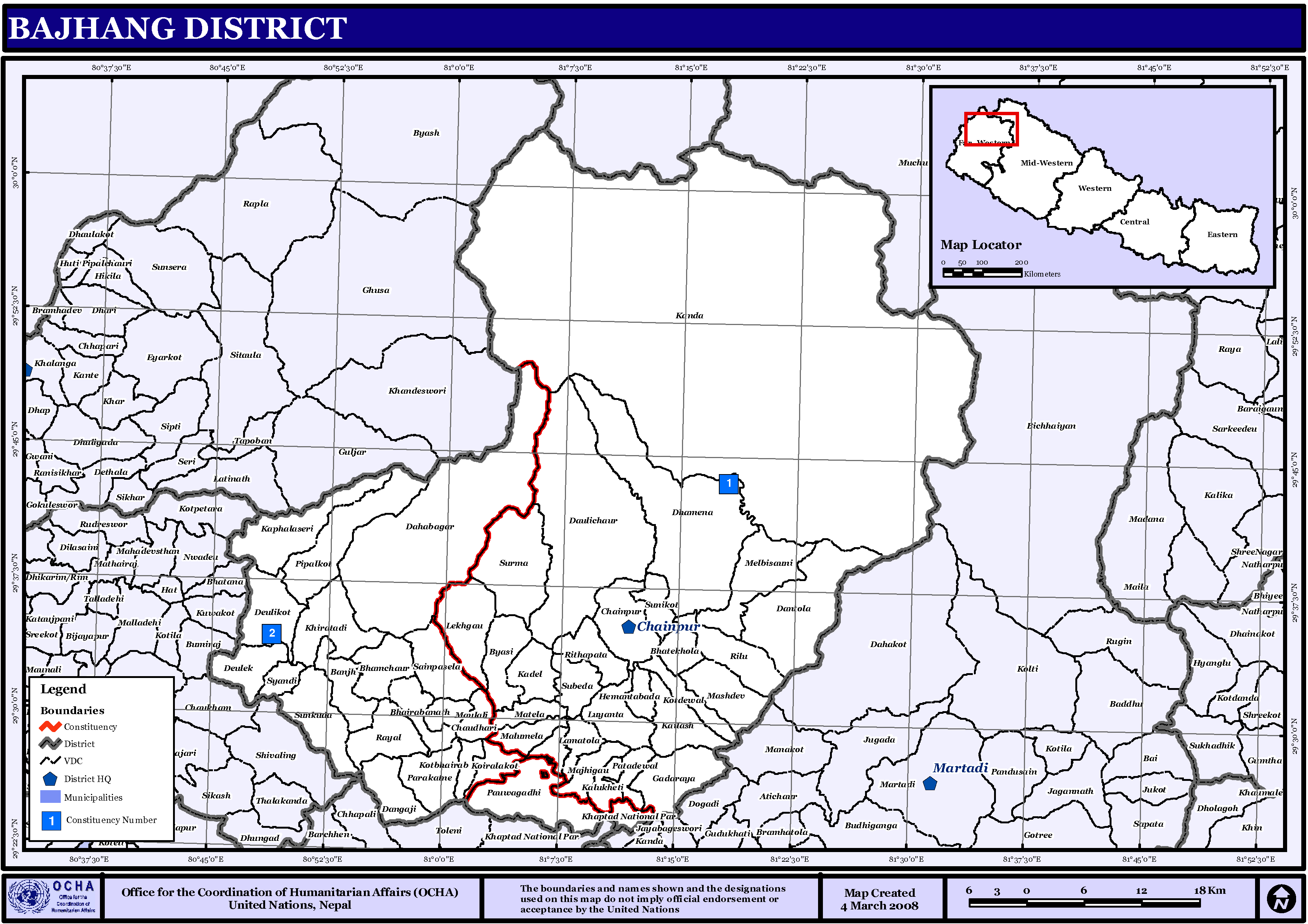
Bajhang District

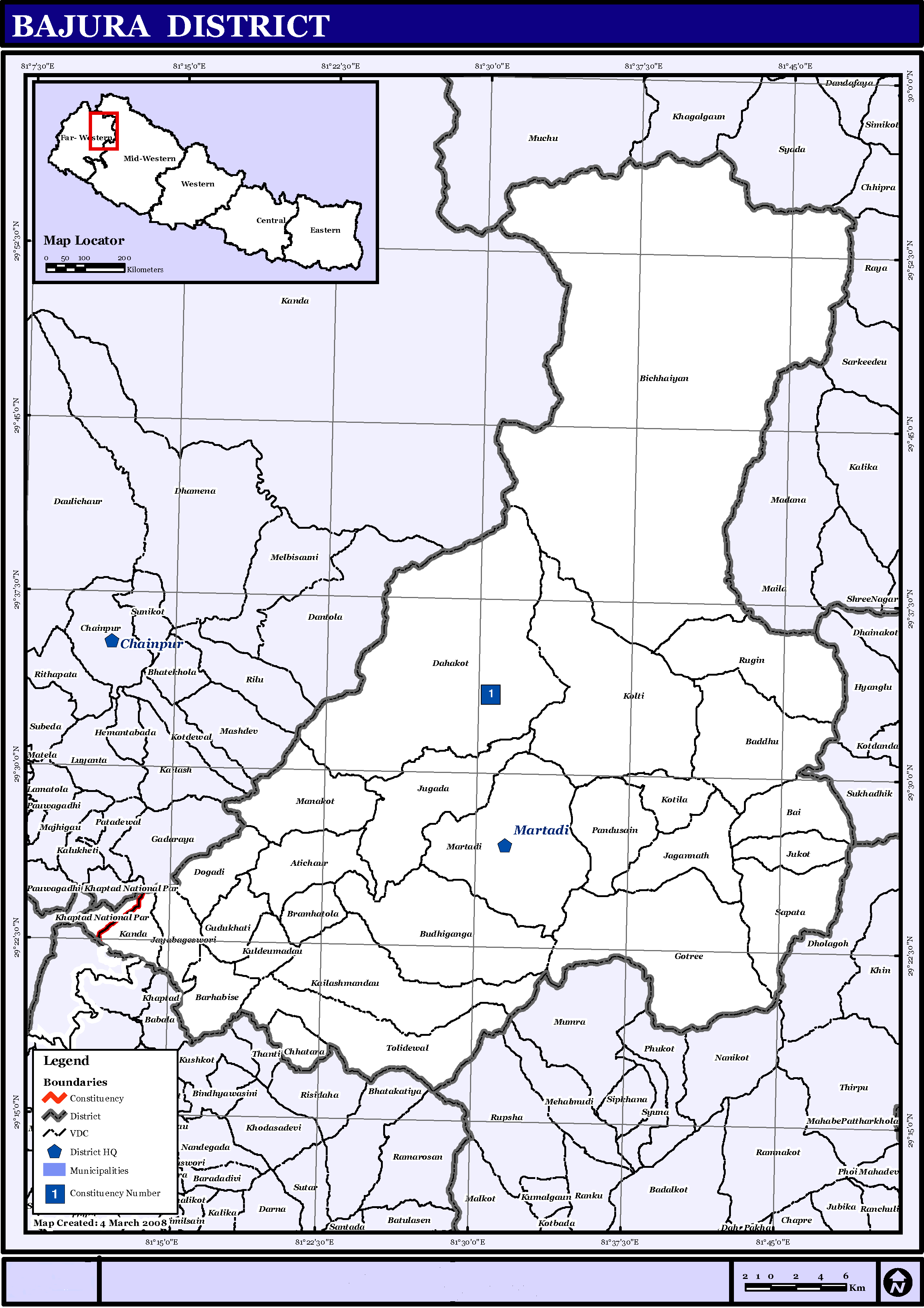
Bajura District

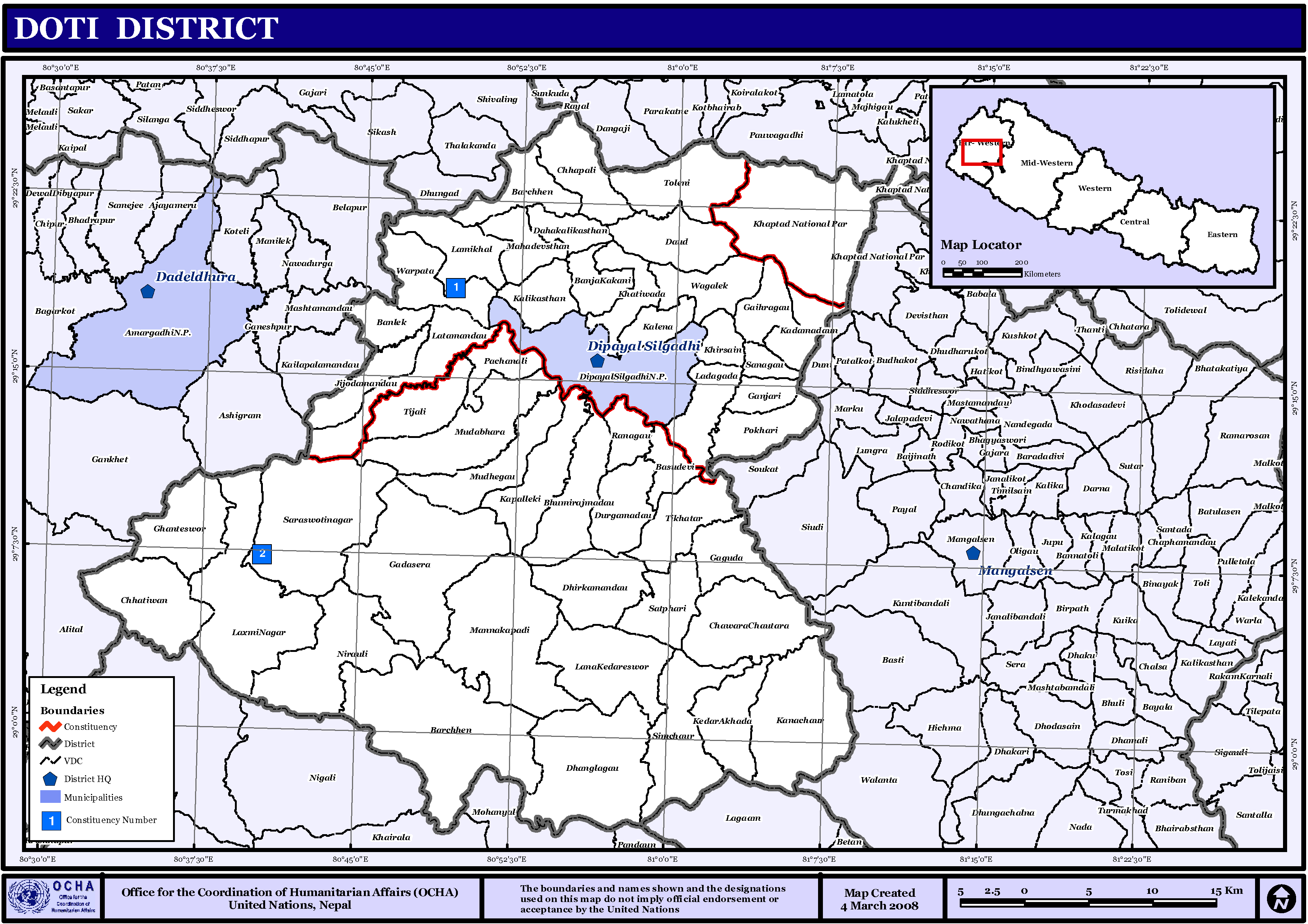
Doti District

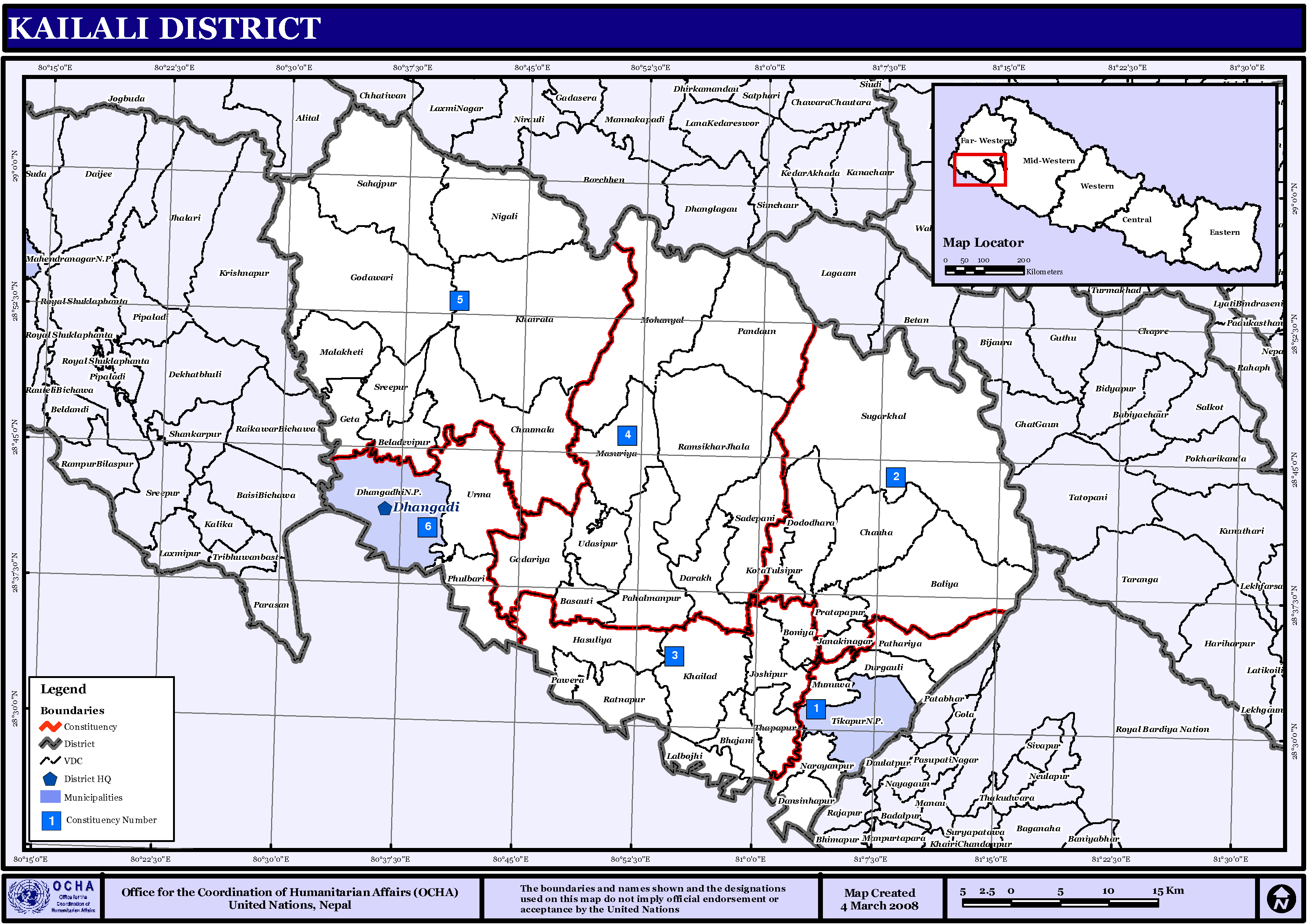
Kailali District

==== Achham District ====
Babala, Bannatoli, Baradadivi, Basti, Batulasen, Bayala, Bhairavsthan, Bhatakatiya, Bhuli, Binayak, Bindhyawasini, Birpath, Budhakot, Chalsa, Chapamandau, Chhatara, Darna, Devisthan, Dhakari, Dhaku, Dhamali, Dharaki, Dhodasain, Dhudharukot, Dhungachalna, Dumi, Gajara, Hatikot, Hichma, Janalikot, Kalagaun, Kalekanda, Kalika, Kalikasthan, Khaptad, Khodasadevi, Kuika, Kushkot, Layati, Lungra, Malatikot, Marku, Mashtanamdali, Nada, Nandegata, Patalkot, Payal, Pulletala, Rahaph, Ramarosan, Raniban, Risidaha, Sakot, Santada, Sera, Siudi, Sutar, Tadigaira, Thanti, Timilsain, Toli, Tosi, Tumarkhad, Walant, Warla

==== Bajhang District ====
Banjh, Bhairab Nath, Bhamchaur, Bhatekhola, Byasi, Chaudhari, Dahabagar, Dangaji, Dantola, Daulichaur, Deulekh, Deulikot, Dhamena, Gadaraya, Kadel, Kailash, Kalukheti, Kanda, Kaphalaseri, Khiratadi, Koiralakot, Kot Bhairab, Kotdewal, Lamatola, Lekhgaun, Majhigaun, Malumela, Mashdev, Matela, Maulali, Melbisauni, Parakatne, Patadewal, Pauwagadhi, Pipalkot, Rayal, Rilu, Sainpasela, Sunikot, Sunkuda, Surma, Syandi

==== Bajura District ====
Atichaur, Baddhu, Bai, Barhabise, Bichhiya, Bramhatola, Budhiganga, Chhatara, Dahakot, Dogadi, Gotri, Gudukhati, Jagannath, Jayabageshwari, Jugada, Kailashmandau, Kanda, Kolti, Kotila, Kuldeumandau, Manakot, Martadi, Pandusain, Rugin, Sappata, Tolodewal

==== Doti District ====
Banalek, Banja Kakani, Barchhen, Basudevi, Bhawardanda, Bhadhegaun, Bhumirajmandau, Changra, Chhapali, Chhatiwan, Dahakalikasthan, Daud, Dhanglagaun, Dhirkamandau, Durgamandau, Gadasera, Gaguda, Gaihragaun, Ganjari, Ghanteshwar, Girichauka, Jijodamandau, Kadamandau, Kalena, Kalikasthan, Kanachaur, Kapalleki, Kedar Akhada, Khatiwada, Khirsain, Ladagada, Lamikhal, Lana Kedareshwar, Latamandau, Lakshminagar, Mahadevsthan, Mannakapadi, Mudabhara, Mudhegaun, Nirauli, Pachanali, Pokhari, Ranagaun, Sanagaun, Saraswatinagar, Satphari, Simchaur, Tijali, Tikha, Tikhatar, Toleni, Wagalek, Warpata

==== Kailali District ====
Basauti, Bhajani, Boniya, Chaumala, Dansinhapur, Darakh, Dododhara, Durgauli, Gadariya, Godawari, Hasuliya, Janakinagar, Joshipur, Khailad, Khairala, Kota Tulsipur, Lalbojhi, Masuriya, Mohanyal, Munuwa, Narayanpur, Nigali, Pahalmanpur, Pandaun, Pawera, Phulbari, Pratapur, Ramsikhar Jhala, Ratnapur, Sadepani, Sahajpur, Sugarkhal, Thapapur, Udasipur, Urma

=== Mahakali Zone ===
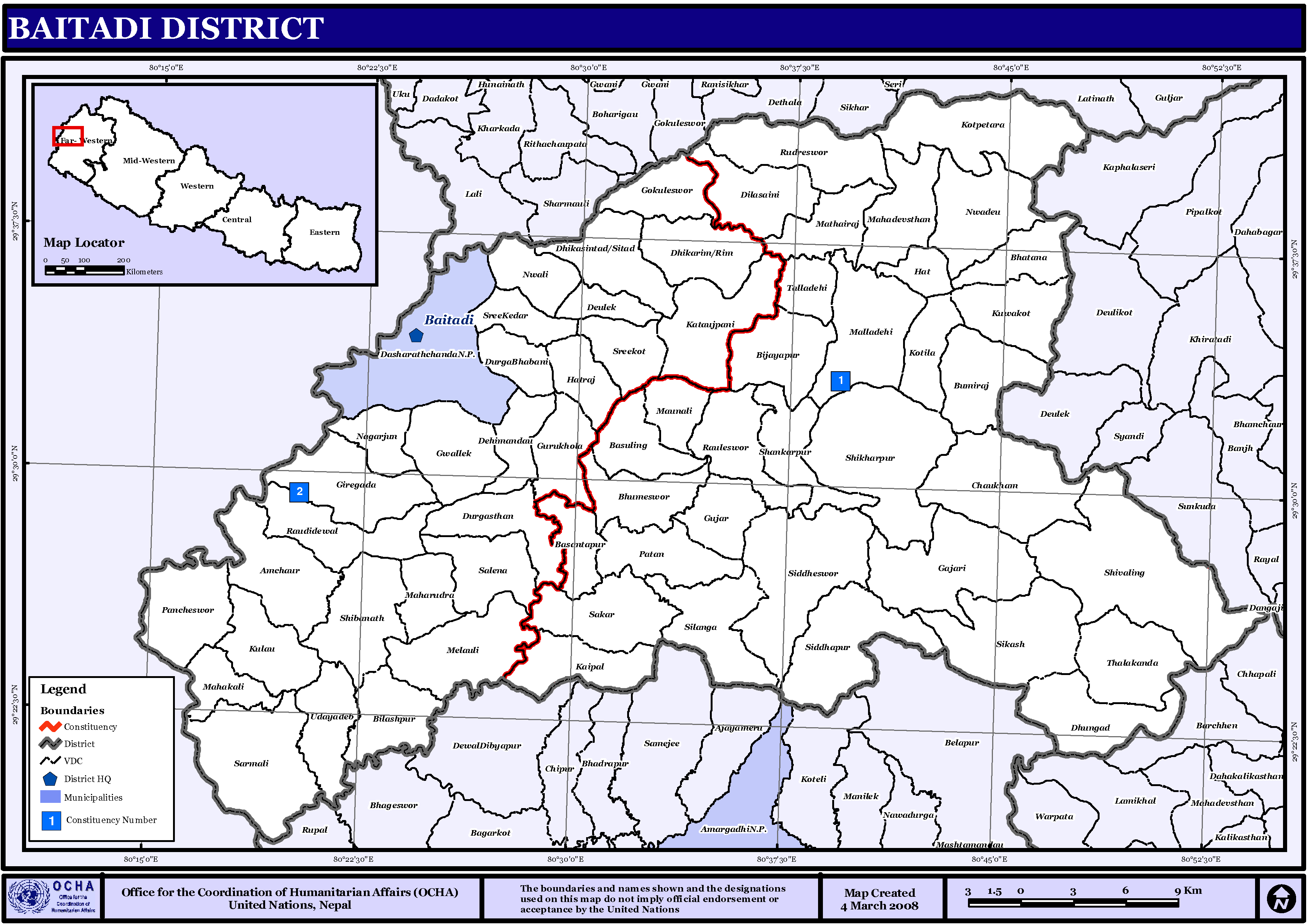
Baitadi District

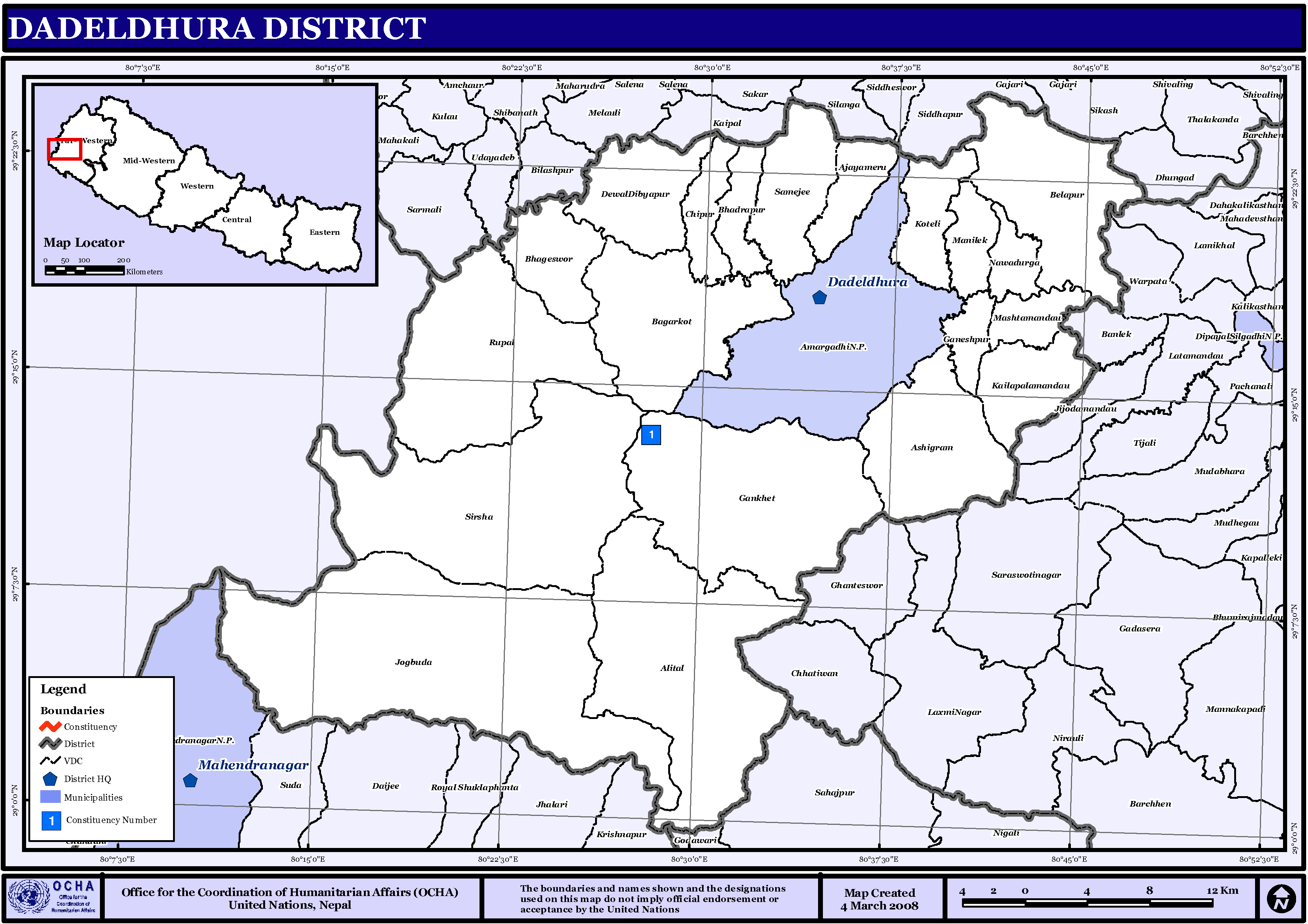
Dadeldhura District

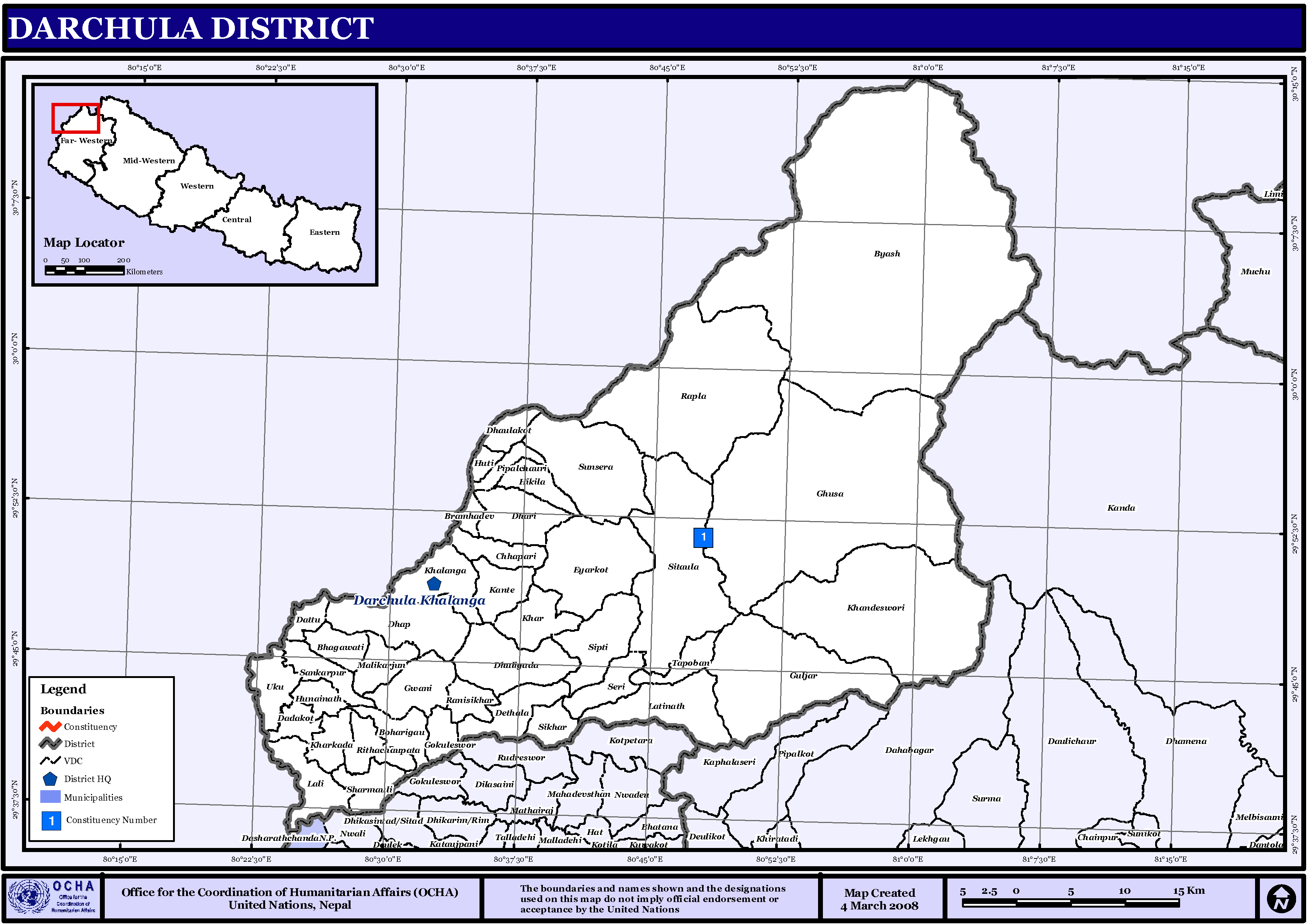
Darchula District

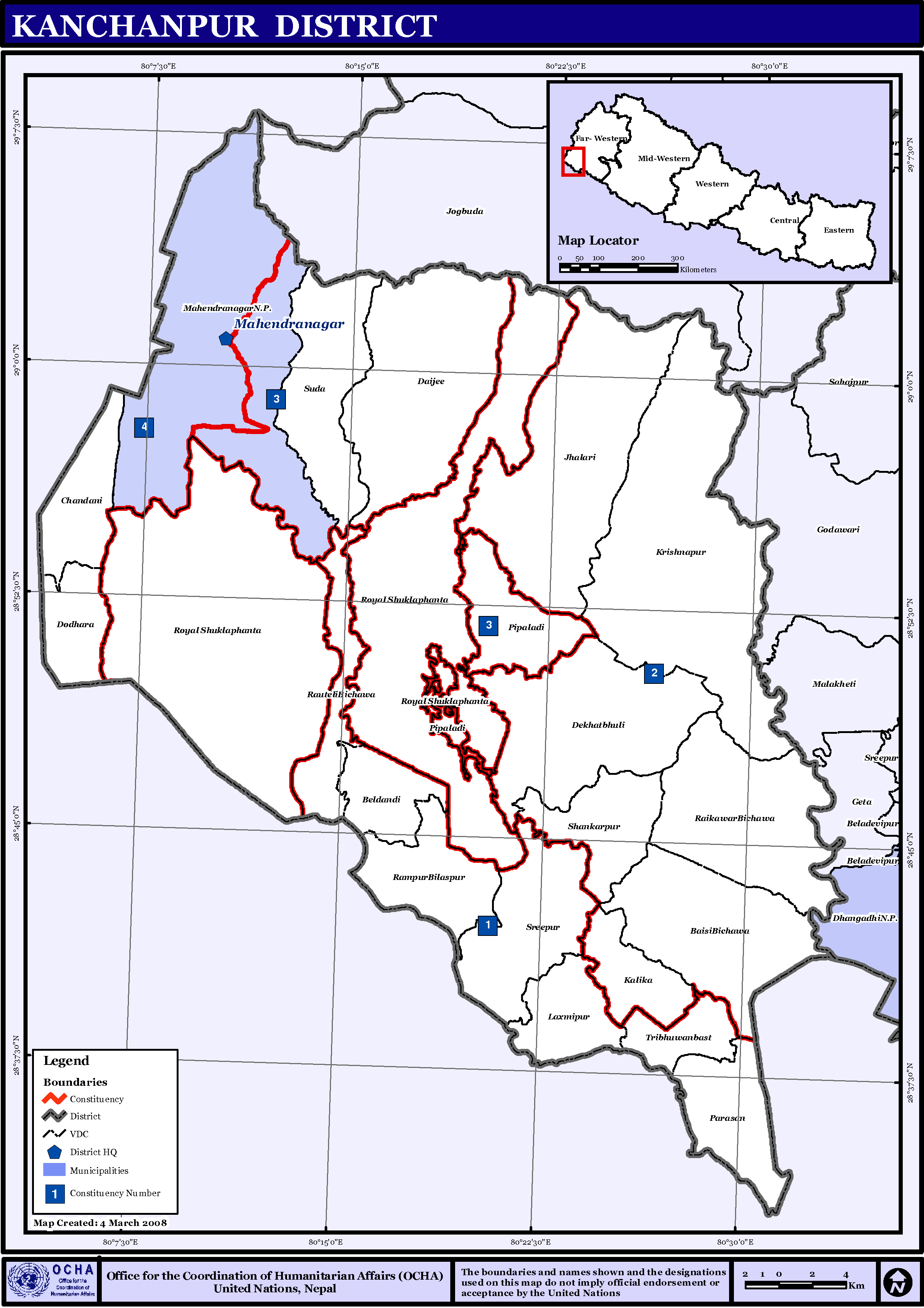
Kanchanpur District

==== Baitadi District ====
Amchaur, Barakot, Basantapur, Basuling, Bhatana, Bhumeshwar, Bijayapur, Bilaspur, Bumiraj, Chadeu, Chaukham, Dehimandau, Deulek, Dhikarim, Dhikasintad, Dhungad, Dilasaini, Rim, Durga Bhabani, Durgasthan, Gajari, Giregada, Gokuleshwar, Gujar, Gurukhola, Gwallek, Hat, Hatraj, Jogannath, Kaipal, Kataujpani, Khalanga, Kotila, Kotpetara, Kulau, Kuwakot, Mahadevsthan, Mahakali, Maharudra, Malladehi, Mathraj, Maunali, Melauli, Nagarjun, Nwadeu, Nwali, Pancheshwar, Patan, Raudidewal, Rauleshwar, Rudreshwar, Sakar, Salena, Sankar, Sarmali, Shibanath, Shikharpur, Shivaling, Srikedar, Siddhapur, Siddheshwar, Sikash, Silanga, Srikot, Talladehi, Thalakanda, Thalegada, Tripurasundari, Udayadeb

==== Dadeldhura District ====
Ajayameru, Alital, Ashigram, Bagarkot, Belapur, Bhadrapur, Bhageshwar, Bhumiraj, Chipur, Dewal Dibyapur, Dhatal, Ganeshpur, Gankhet, Jogbuda, Kailapalmandau, Khalanga, Koteli, Manilek, Mashtamandau, Nawadurga, Rupal, Sahastralinga, Samaiji, Sirsha

==== Darchula District ====
Bhagawati, Boharigau, Byans, Dadakot, Datu, Dethala, Dhari, Dhaulakot, Dhuligada, Eyarkot, Ghusa, Gokuleshwar, Gulijar, Gwami, Hikila, Hunainath, Huti, Khandeshwari, Khar, Kharkada, Lali, Latinath, Malikarjun, Pipalchauri, Ralpa, Ranisikhar, Rithachaupata, Sankarpur, Seri, Sharmauli, Sikhar, Sipti, Sitaula, Sunsera, Tapoban, Uku

==== Kanchanpur District ====
Baise Bichawa, Beldandi, Chandani, Daiji, Dekhatbhuli, Dodhara, Jhalari, Krishnapur, Pipaladi, Raikawar Bichawa, Rauteli Bichawa, Sankarpur, Suda

== See also ==
- Village development committees in Nepal topics
- Development Regions of Nepal
- List of districts of Nepal
- List of provinces of Nepal
- List of zones of Nepal
