= Parsa 4 =

Parliamentary constituency in Madhesh Province, Nepal

- Parliamentary constituency
- Parsa 4 in Province No. 2
- Province: Province No. 2
- District: Parsa District

Current constituency
- Created: 1991
- Party: Rastriya Swatantra Party
- Member of Parliament: Tek Bahadur Shakya

Parsa 4 is one of four parliamentary constituencies of Parsa District in Nepal. This constituency came into existence on the Constituency Delimitation Commission (CDC) report submitted on 31 August 2017.

== Incorporated areas ==
Parsa 4 incorporates Thori Rural Municipality, Jirabhawani Rural Municipality, Chhipaharmai Rural Municipality, Dhobini Rural Municipality, Kalikamai Rural Municipality, wards 1–5 Jagarnathpur Rural Municipality and ward 5 of Pakaha Mainpur Rural Municipality.

== Assembly segments ==
It encompasses the following Province No. 2 Provincial Assembly segment

- Parsa 4(A)
- Parsa 4(B)

== Members of Parliament ==
=== Parliament/Constituent Assembly ===
Election	Member	Party
1991	Ramesh Rijal	Nepali Congress
1999	Urmila Aryal	CPN (Unified Marxist–Leninist)
2008	Praduman Prasad Chauhan	CPN (Unified Marxist–Leninist)
2013	Surendra Prasad Chaudhary	Nepali Congress
2017	Laxman Lal Karna	Rastriya Janata Party Nepal
April 2020	Laxman Lal Karna	People's Socialist Party, Nepal
August 2021	Laxman Lal Karna	Loktantrik Samajwadi Party, Nepal
2022	Ramesh Rijal	Nepali Congress
2026	Tek Bahadur Shakya	Rastriya Swatantra Party

=== Provincial Assembly ===
==== 4(A) ====
Election	Member	Party
2017	Shankar Prasad Chaudhary	Nepali Congress

==== 4(B) ====
Election	Member	Party
2017	Singhasan Sah Kalwar	Federal Socialist Forum, Nepal
May 2019	Singhasan Sah Kalwar	Samajbadi Party, Nepal
April 2020	Singhasan Sah Kalwar	People's Socialist Party, Nepal

== Election results ==
=== Election in the 2020s ===
==== 2022 general election ====
Candidate	Party	Votes	%
Ramesh Rijal	Nepali Congress	31,224	51.94
Jalim Miya Mansoori	CPN (UML)	25,671	42.70
Abadesh Prasad Gauro	Rastriya Prajatantra Party	1,283	2.13
Others		1,938	3.22
Total		60,116	100.00
Majority		5,553	
Nepali Congress gain			

=== Election in the 2010s ===
==== 2017 legislative elections ====
Party	Candidate	Votes
Rastriya Janata Party Nepal	Laxman Lal Karna	20,738
Nepali Congress	Ramesh Rijal	14,702
CPN (Maoist Centre)	Urmila Aryal	9,617
Nepal Federal Socialist Party	Imdad Gaddi	2,789
Janasamajbadi Party Nepal	Santosh Kumar Sah	1,130
Others		815
Invalid votes		3,308
Result	RJPN gain	
Source: Election Commission

==== 2017 Nepalese provincial elections ====
===== 4(A) =====
Party	Candidate	Votes
Nepali Congress	Shankar Prasad Chaudhary	7,488
CPN (Unified Marxist–Leninist)	Jay Prakash Tharu	7,040
Rastriya Janata Party Nepal	Ram Chandra Pandit	5,120
Others		3,669
Invalid votes		1,458
Result	Congress gain	
Source: Election Commission

===== 4(B) =====
Party	Candidate	Votes
Federal Socialist Forum, Nepal	Singhasan Sah Kalwar	11,708
Nepali Congress	Bashishta Narayan Prasad Kurmi	6,027
CPN (Maoist Centre)	Suresh Prasad Kurmi	4,589
Nepal Federal Socialist Party	Mohammad Nasrullah Miya	3,750
Others		893
Invalid votes		1,187
Result	FSFN gain	
Source: Election Commission

==== 2013 Constituent Assembly election ====
Party	Candidate	Votes
Nepali Congress	Surendra Prasad Chaudhary	12,963
Federal Socialist Party, Nepal	Raj Kumar Yadav	7,142
CPN (Unified Marxist–Leninist)	Praduman Prasad Chauhan	6,383
UCPN (Maoist)	Prahalad Giri Goswami	4,138
Madheshi Janaadhikar Forum, Nepal	Abdul Raheem Ansari	1,826
Rastriya Prajatantra Party	Bhupadev Prasad Raya	1,420
Madheshi Janaadhikar Forum, Nepal (Democratic)	Ram Baksa Mahato Tharu	1,345
Dalit Janajati Party	Noor Alam Ansari	1,133
Others		3,073
Result	Congress gain	
Source: NepalNews

=== Election in the 2000s ===
==== 2008 Constituent Assembly election ====
Party	Candidate	Votes
CPN (Unified Marxist–Leninist)	Praduman Prasad Chauhan	12,490
Nepali Congress	Surendra Prasad Chaudhary	12,247
Terai Madhes Loktantrik Party	Janardan Prasad Yadav	7,707
CPN (Maoist)	Bali Ram Prasad Teli	4,125
Rastriya Prajatantra Party	Bishwanath Prasad Teli	2,592
Sadbhavana Party	Mainuddin Ansari	1,949
Madheshi Janaadhikar Forum, Nepal	Harendra Singh Bhumihar	1,819
Others		2,380
Invalid votes		3,802
Result	CPN (hold)	
Source: Election Commission

=== Election in the 1990s ===
==== 1999 legislative elections ====
Party	Candidate	Votes
CPN (Unified Marxist–Leninist)	Urmila Aryal	17,095
Nepali Congress	Ramesh Rijal	15,927
Independent	Ram Babu Jaiswal	4,952
Rastriya Prajatantra Party	Gokhul Prasad Kurmi	3,881
Others		1,372
Invalid Votes		1,225
Result	CPN (UML) gain	
Source: Election Commission

==== 1994 legislative elections ====
Party	Candidate	Votes
Nepali Congress	Ramesh Rijal	12,116
CPN (Unified Marxist–Leninist)	Urmila Aryal	9,288
Rastriya Prajatantra Party	Gokhul Prasad Kurmi	7,379
Independent	Faizal Ahmed Miya	6,185
Others		824
Result	Congress hold	
Source: Election Commission

==== 1991 legislative elections ====
Party	Candidate	Votes
Nepali Congress	Ramesh Rijal	12,696
CPN (Unified Marxist–Leninist)	Urmila Aryal	7,930
Result	Congress gain	

== See also ==
- List of parliamentary constituencies of Nepal
