= Parsa 3 =

Parliamentary constituency in Madhesh Province, Nepal

- Parliamentary constituency
- Parsa 3 in Province No. 2
- Province: Province No. 2
- District: Parsa District

Current constituency
- Created: 1991
- Party: Rastriya Swatantra Party
- MP: Ramakant Prasad Chaurasiya

Parsa 3 is one of four parliamentary constituencies of Parsa District in Nepal. This constituency came into existence on the Constituency Delimitation Commission (CDC) report submitted on 31 August 2017.

== Incorporated areas ==
Parsa 3 incorporates Paterwa Sugauli Rural Municipality, Sakhuwa Prasauni Rural Municipality, Bindhabasini Rural Municipality, ward 6 of Jagarnathpur Rural Municipality, wards 1–4 Pakaha Mainpur Rural Municipality, wards 1, 2 and 4–10 of Pokhariya Municipality and wards 1, 5 and 7–9 of Bahudarmai Municipality.

== Assembly segments ==
It encompasses the following Province No. 2 Provincial Assembly segment

- Parsa 3(A)
- Parsa 3(B)

== Members of Parliament ==
=== Parliament/Constituent Assembly ===
Election	Member	Party
1991	Surendra Prasad Chaudhary	Nepali Congress
2008	Ajay Kumar Chaurasiya	Nepali Congress
2013	Raj Kumar Gupta	CPN (Unified Marxist–Leninist)
2017	Hari Narayan Prasad Sah Rauniyar	Federal Socialist Forum, Nepal
May 2019	Hari Narayan Prasad Sah Rauniyar	Samajbadi Party, Nepal
April 2020	Hari Narayan Prasad Sah Rauniyar	People's Socialist Party, Nepal
2022	Raj Kumar Gupta	CPN (Unified Marxist–Leninist)
2026	Ramakant Prasad Chaurasiya	Rastriya Swatantra Party

=== Provincial Assembly ===
==== 3(A) ====
Election	Member	Party
2017	Abdul Rahim Ansari	Federal Socialist Forum, Nepal
May 2019	Abdul Rahim Ansari	Samajbadi Party, Nepal
April 2020	Abdul Rahim Ansari	People's Socialist Party, Nepal

==== 3(B) ====
Election	Member	Party
2017	Prahlad Giri Goswami	Federal Socialist Forum, Nepal
May 2019	Prahlad Giri Goswami	Samajbadi Party, Nepal
April 2020	Prahlad Giri Goswami	People's Socialist Party, Nepal
August 2021	Prahlad Giri Goswami	Loktantrik Samajwadi Party, Nepal

== Election results ==
=== Election in the 2020s ===
==== 2026 general election ====
Candidate	Party	Votes	%
Ramakant Prasad Chaurasiya	Rastriya Swatantra Party	29,679	47.58
Surendra Prasad Chaudhary	Nepali Congress	16,366	26.23
Rupesh Kumar Pandey	CPN (UML)	11,914	19.10
Chhotelal Prasad Yadav	Nepali Communist Party	2,137	3.43
Others		2,287	3.67
Total		62,383	100.00
Valid votes		62,383	92.95
Invalid/blank votes		4,730	7.05
Total votes		67,113	100.00
Registered voters/turnout		96,542	69.52
Majority		13,313	
Rastriya Swatantra Party gain			

==== 2022 general election ====
Candidate	Party	Votes	%
Raj Kumar Gupta	CPN (UML)	24,319	39.43
Surendra Prasad Chaudhary	Nepali Congress	24,152	39.16
Raj Kumar Yadav	Nepal Susashan Party	10,503	17.03
Angad Thakur	Rastriya Prajatantra Party	1,458	2.36
Others		1,241	2.01
Total		61,673	100.00
Majority		167	
CPN (UML)			

=== Election in the 2010s ===
==== 2017 legislative elections ====
Party	Candidate	Votes
Federal Socialist Forum, Nepal	Hari Narayan Prasad Sah Rauniyar	15,168
Nepali Congress	Surendra Prasad Chaudhary	13,801
CPN (Unified Marxist–Leninist)	Raj Kumar Gupta	10,986
Nepal Federal Socialist Party	Raj Kumar Yadav	10,009
Others		899
Invalid votes		3,152
Result	FSFN gain	
Source: Election Commission

==== 2017 Nepalese provincial elections ====
===== 3(A) =====
Party	Candidate	Votes
Federal Socialist Forum, Nepal	Abdul Rahim Ansari	7,004
Nepali Congress	Chanda Kishor Prasad	6,845
CPN (Unified Marxist–Leninist)	Nagendra Prasad Chaudhary	5,986
Nepal Federal Socialist Party	Shriram Giri	4,284
Others		1,541
Invalid votes		1,467
Result	FSFN gain	
Source: Election Commission

===== 3(B) =====
Party	Candidate	Votes
Federal Socialist Forum, Nepal	Prahlad Giri Goswami	6,345
Nepali Congress	Janardan Singh Chhetri	6,250
CPN (Maoist Centre)	Chhota Lal Prasad Yadav	4,346
Independent	Bindhyachal Thakur Hajaam	3,732
Nepal Federal Socialist Party	Shankar Raut Ahir	3,321
Others		1,603
Invalid votes		1,442
Result	FSFN gain	
Source: Election Commission

==== 2013 Constituent Assembly election ====
Party	Candidate	Votes
CPN (Unified Marxist–Leninist)	Raj Kumar Gupta	16,192
Nepali Congress	Ajay Kumar Chaurasiya	12,275
Madheshi Janaadhikar Forum, Nepal	Chhotalal Prasad Yadv	2,776
Sanghiya Sadbhava Party	Shiva Prasad Patel	1,700
UCPN (Maoist)	Jitendra Prasad Yadav	1,517
Terai Madhesh Sadbhvana Party Nepal	Prem Chandra Kushwaha	1,388
Others		3,831
Result	CPN (UML) gain	
Source: NepalNews

=== Election in the 2000s ===
==== 2008 Constituent Assembly election ====
Party	Candidate	Votes
Nepali Congress	Ajay Kumar Chaurasiya	14,650
Terai Madhes Loktantrik Party	Ram Chandra Kushwaha	9,931
CPN (Unified Marxist–Leninist)	Ram Chandra Shah Teli	5,412
CPN (Maoist)	Ram Ashraya Mahara	3,945
Sadbhavana Party	Shiva Prasad Patel	3,401
Madheshi Janaadhikar Forum, Nepal	Asheshwar Prasad Ahir	2,667
Rastriya Prajatantra Party Nepal	Shambhu Prasad Chaurasiya	1,521
Rastriya Prajatantra Party	Santosh Kumar Tiwari	1,415
Others		1,173
Invalid votes		4,260
Result	Congress hold	
Source: Election Commission

=== Election in the 1990s ===
==== 1999 legislative elections ====
Party	Candidate	Votes
Nepali Congress	Surendra Prasad Chaudhary	21,879
CPN (Unified Marxist–Leninist)	Prahalad Giri Goswami	20,201
Rastriya Prajatantra Party	Chandra Dev Chaudhary	4,794
Nepal Sadbhawana Party	Safayat Miya Muslim	1,155
Others		1,438
Invalid Votes		960
Result	Congress hold	
Source: Election Commission

==== 1994 legislative elections ====
Party	Candidate	Votes
Nepali Congress	Surendra Prasad Chaudhary	17,743
Rastriya Prajatantra Party	Basudev Tiwari	12,766
CPN (Unified Marxist–Leninist)	Prahalad Giri Goswami	7,064
Nepal Janabadi Morcha	Chandra Dev Chaudhary	1,810
Nepal Sadbhawana Party	Indra Prasad Yadav	1,318
Others		1,529
Result	Congress hold	
Source: Election Commission

==== 1991 legislative elections ====
Party	Candidate	Votes
Nepali Congress	Surendra Prasad Chaudhary	16,649
Rastriya Prajatantra Party (Thapa)	Nagendra Prasad Chaudhary	7,645
Result	Congress gain	

== See also ==
- List of parliamentary constituencies of Nepal
