= Surendra Prasad Chaudhary =

Nepalese politician

Honorable Surendra Prasad Chaudhary
- सुरेन्‍द्र प्रसाद चौधरी
- Born: 12 September 1958 (age 68)
- Education: Tribhuvan University (B.A., M.A.)
- Occupation: Politician
- Years active: 1990-present
- Title: Member of Constituent Assembly
- Political party: Nepali Congress Party
- Parents: Ramdayal Chaudhary (father); Laxmi Devi (mother)

Surendra Prasad Chaudhary (born 12 September 1958) is a Nepalese politician, former Minister, a four-term member of parliament, and a member of the Constituent Assembly.

He served as the Minister of Science and Technology, and Minister of Commerce and Supplies. He was also the Pro-Vice-Chancellor of the Royal Nepal Academy of Science and Technology. He was the Central Committee Member of Nepali Congress Party and former President of party's Parsa district committee. He served in the cabinet of Krishna Prasad Bhattarai and Girija Prasad Koirala.

He represents Nepali Congress Party in the Progressive Alliance. He was also the member of Nepal Council of World Affairs.

== Early life and education ==
Chaudhary was born on 12 September 1958 to his parents Ramdayal Chaudhary and Laxmi Devi. He received his undergraduate degree in Economics, Master's Degree in English Literature from Tribhuvan University and a postgraduate certificate from Harvard University.

== 2022 Federal and Provincial Elections ==
In the House of Representatives election conducted on November 20, 2022, Chaudhary was defeated by Raj Kumar Gupta, a UML candidate, in Constituency No. 3 Parsa, with a margin of 167 votes. Gupta secured 24,319 votes, while Chaudhary received 24,152 votes.

== 2013 Election of the Second Constituent Assembly ==
Chaudhary was elected as a Member of Parliament of the Second Constituent Assembly following election in November 2013, following the failure of the first CA. Chaudhary won from Parsa-4 with 12,963 votes against candidates Raj Kumar Yadav of Federal Socialist Party (7,142 votes) and Praduman Prasad Chauhan of CPN (UML) (6,383 votes).

== 1999 House of Representatives Election ==
In the 1999 House of Representatives election, that was held on 3 and 17 May 1999, Surendra Prasad Chaudhary won from Parsa District, Constituency No.3. There were 49,467 votes cast in Constituency No. 3. Chaudhary obtained 21,879 (44.23%) votes and secured victory in the election. The runner-up candidate was Praladh Giri of Nepal Communist Party (Unified Marxist-Leninist) who secured 20,201 (40.84%) votes and came in second position. All other candidates secured 7,387 (14.93%) votes.

== 1994 House of Representatives Election ==
In the 1994 House of Representatives election, that was held on 15 November 1994, Surendra Prasad Chaudhary won from Parsa District, Constituency No. 3. Chaudhary obtained 17,743 votes (42.02%) and secured victory. The runner-up candidate was Basudev Tiwari of Rastriya Prajatantra Party (RPP) who secured 12,766 votes (30.23%) came in second position. Praladh Giri of CPN (UML) came third with 7,064 votes (16.73%).

He was the member of Parliamentary Monitoring Joint Committee headed by the Speaker of the Lower House Ram Chandra Poudel, which was constituted to guide the Nepalese side in the preparation of the detailed project report of Pancheshwar Multipurpose Project (PMP), a bi-national hydropower project to be developed in Mahakali River bordering Nepal and India.

== 1991 House of Representatives Election ==
In the 1991 House of Representatives election held on May 12, 1991, Surendra Prasad Chaudhary emerged victorious in Constituency No. 3 of Parsa District. Chaudhary secured 16,649 votes, surpassing his closest rival Nagendra Prasad Chaudhary from the Rastriya Prajatantra Party, who garnered 7,645 votes. During this term, Chaudhary assumed his initial role as the Assistant Minister for Commerce and Supplies under the cabinet of Prime Minister Girija Prasad Koirala, having been appointed by His Majesty the King on 29 December 1991. Subsequently, on 27 June 1993, he was entrusted with the position of Minister of State for Commerce and Supplies.

Chaudhary served as the Whip of the Nepali Congress Party in parliament, holding this position from July 4, 1991, to December 29, 1991. He additionally held membership in the State Direction's Committee of the parliament, having been appointed to this position on September 12, 1991.

== Minister of Science and Technology ==
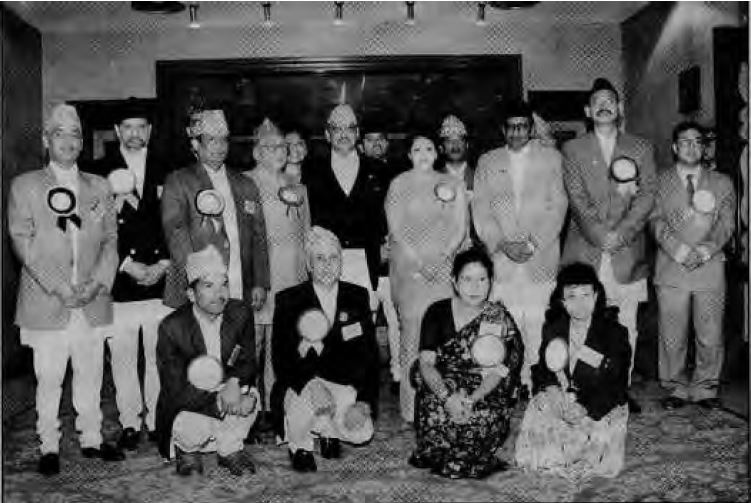
Minister Chaudhary with King Birendra

As the Minister of State for Science and Technology, Chaudhary led Nepalese delegation during the Fifth Session of the United Nations Economic and Social Council's Commission on Science and Technology for Development, held in Geneva from May 28 to June 1, 2001.

== Minister of Commerce and Supplies ==
Chaudhary led the Nepalese delegation to The Trade Negotiations Committee at its thirty-ninth meeting at Ministerial level, under the Chairmanship of Sergio Abreu Bonilla, Minister of Foreign Affairs of Uruguay. The Uruguay Round was the largest ever international trade negotiation. It took place within the framework of the General Agreement on Tariffs and Trade (GATT) and was launched at Punta del Este, Uruguay on 20 September 1986 and formally concluded at Marrakesh, Morocco, on 15 April 1994.

== Detention ==
Chaudhary spent over 7 years as a prisoner of conscience on various occasions, for being an opponent of the panchayat system and authoritarian monarchical system of Nepal.
