= Hari Narayan Rauniyar =

Nepali politician

Hari Narayan Prasad Sah Rauniyar
- हरि नारायण प्रसाद साह रौनियार

Member of Parliament, Pratinidhi Sabha
- In office 4 March 2018 – 2022
- Preceded by: Raj Kumar Gupta
- Succeeded by: Ajay Chaurasiya
- Constituency: Parsa 3

Personal details
- Born: 31 January 1961 (age 65)
- Party: People's Socialist Party
- Other political affiliations: Federal Socialist Forum

Hari Narayan Prasad Sah Rauniyar is a Nepali politician and former member of the Nepal House of Representatives. He was elected from Parsa-3 constituency in the 2017 elections, representing Federal Socialist Forum. He was charged with corruption and automatically suspended from parliament in October 2018, after the Commission for Investigation of the Abuse of Authority filed a case against him and 12 others over the negligence and embezzlement in the construction of the Babai river bridge which had collapsed during construction in 2017. He is the former proprietor of Pappu Construction that was building the bridge under government contract.
