= Parsa 2 =

Parliamentary constituency in Nepal

- Parliamentary constituency
- Parsa 2 in Province No. 2
- Province: Province No. 2
- District: Parsa District

Current constituency
- Created: 1991
- Party: Rastriya Swatantra Party
- Member of Parliament: Sushil Kumar Kanu
- MPA Madesh Pradesh 2A: Shyam Prasad Patel
- MPA Madesh Pradesh 2B: Ramesh Kurmi

Parsa 2 is one of four parliamentary constituencies of Parsa District in Nepal. This constituency came into existence on the Constituency Delimitation Commission (CDC) report submitted on 31 August 2017.

== Incorporated areas ==
Parsa 2 incorporates Parsagadhi Municipality, wards 2–4 and 6 of Bahudarmai Municipality and wards 1, 3, 6, 9, 10, 17, 19 and 24–29 of Birgunj Metropolitan City.

== Assembly segments ==
It encompasses the following Province No. 2 Provincial Assembly segment

- Parsa 2(A)
- Parsa 2(B)

== Members of Parliament ==
=== Parliament/Constituent Assembly ===
Election	Member	Party
1991	Ram Chandra Kushwaha	Nepali Congress
1999	Ajay Kumar Chaurasiya	Nepali Congress
2008	Ajay Kumar Dwivedi	Nepali Congress
2013	Bichari Prasad Yadav	CPN (Unified Marxist–Leninist)
2017	Bimal Prasad Shrivastav	Federal Socialist Forum, Nepal
May 2019	Bimal Prasad Shrivastav	Samajbadi Party, Nepal
April 2020	Bimal Prasad Shrivastav	People's Socialist Party, Nepal
August 2021	Bimal Prasad Shrivastav	Loktantrik Samajwadi Party, Nepal
2022	Ajay Kumar Chaurasiya	Nepali Congress
2026	Sushil Kumar Kanu	Rastriya Swatantra Party

=== Provincial Assembly ===
==== 2(A) ====
Election	Member	Party
2017	Rajeshwor Prasad Sah	Nepali Congress

==== 2(B) ====
Election	Member	Party
2017	Ramesh Prasad Kurmi	Rastriya Janata Party Nepal
April 2020	Ramesh Prasad Kurmi	People's Socialist Party, Nepal
August 2021	Ramesh Prasad Kurmi	Loktantrik Samajwadi Party, Nepal

== Election results ==
=== Election in the 2020s ===
==== 2022 general election ====
Candidate	Party	Votes	%
Ajaya Kumar Chaurasiya	Nepali Congress	28,451	51.26
Surendra Prasad Kurmi	People's Socialist Party, Nepal	22,445	40.44
Naresh Kumar Sah	Rastriya Prajatantra Party	2,741	4.94
Others		1,864	3.36
Total		55,501	100.00
Majority		6,006	
Nepali Congress gain			

=== Election in the 2010s ===
==== 2017 legislative elections ====
Party	Candidate	Votes
Federal Socialist Forum, Nepal	Bimal Prasad Shrivastav	21,169
Nepali Congress	Ajay Kumar Chaurasiya	19,704
CPN (Maoist Centre)	Mohammad Salim Mansoor	6,729
Others		1,643
Invalid votes		2,849
Result	FSFN gain	
Source: Election Commission

==== 2017 Nepalese provincial elections ====
===== 2(A) =====
Party	Candidate	Votes
Nepali Congress	Rajeshwor Prasad Sah	10,259
Federal Socialist Forum, Nepal	Ram Naresh Prasad Yadav	10,079
CPN (Unified Marxist–Leninist)	Ram Chandra Sah Teli	5,057
Others		574
Invalid votes		1,085
Result	Congress gain	
Source: Election Commission

===== 2(B) =====
Party	Candidate	Votes
Rastriya Janata Party Nepal	Ramesh Prasad Kurmi	9,706
Nepali Congress	Ram Rup Prasad	7,662
CPN (Maoist Centre)	Chhotolal Prasad Kurmi	2,663
Others		3,631
Invalid votes		1,106
Result	RJPN gain	
Source: Election Commission

==== 2013 Constituent Assembly election ====
Party	Candidate	Votes
CPN (Unified Marxist–Leninist)	Bichari Prasad Yadav	8,714
Madheshi Janaadhikar Forum, Nepal	Pradeep Yadav	6,711
Nepali Congress	Ajay Kumar Dwivedi	6,516
UCPN (Maoist)	Mohammad Basuridin Ansari	4,402
Rastriya Prajatantra Party Nepal	Rajiv Parajuli	4,337
Madheshi Janaadhikar Forum (Republican)	Shashi Kapoor Miya	2,306
Rastriya Prajatantra Party	Ram Ayodhya Raut Kurmi	1,419
Madheshi Janaadhikar Forum, Nepal (Democratic)	Narayanji Rauniyar	1,263
Others		2,415
Result	CPN (UML) gain	
Source: NepalNews

=== Election in the 2000s ===
==== 2008 Constituent Assembly election ====
Party	Candidate	Votes
Nepali Congress	Ajay Kumar Dwivedi	9,531
Madheshi Janaadhikar Forum, Nepal	Shashi Kapoor Miya	8,021
Rastriya Prajatantra Party	Gokhul Prasad Kurmi	6,457
CPN (Unified Marxist–Leninist)	Bichari Prasad Yadav	5,656
Rastriya Prajatantra Party Nepal	Rajiv Parajuli	3,850
CPN (Maoist)	Hari Prasad Mandal	2,402
Independent	Dr. Kamrul Hodhha Ansari	1,659
Terai Madhes Loktantrik Party	Gopal Raut	1,089
Others		2,933
Invalid votes		3,754
Result	Congress hold	
Source: Election Commission

=== Election in the 1990s ===
==== 1999 legislative elections ====
Party	Candidate	Votes
Nepali Congress	Ajay Kumar Chaurasiya	20,178
CPN (Unified Marxist–Leninist)	Nagendra Prasad Chaudhary	19,622
Rastriya Prajatantra Party (Chand)	Mohan Lal Chaudhary	4,633
Rastriya Prajatantra Party	Mohan Prasad Nepali	2,554
CPN (Marxist–Leninist)	Ramashre Ram Chamar	1,003
Others		924
Invalid Votes		1,393
Result	Congress hold	
Source: Election Commission

==== 1994 legislative elections ====
Party	Candidate	Votes
Nepali Congress	Ram Chandra Kushwaha	13,347
CPN (Unified Marxist–Leninist)	Ram Chandra Sah	11,119
Rastriya Prajatantra Party	Mohan Lal Chaudhary	8,794
Nepal Sadbhawana Party	Indra Prasad Yadav	5,039
Others		1,948
Result	Congress hold	
Source: Election Commission

==== 1991 legislative elections ====
Party	Candidate	Votes
Nepali Congress	Ram Chandra Kushwaha	16,623
CPN (Unified Marxist–Leninist)	Nagendra Prasad Chaudhary	10,652
Result	Congress gain	

== See also ==
- List of parliamentary constituencies of Nepal
