= Janardan Singh Chhetri =

Nepali politician

Honourable Janardan Singh Chhetri
- जनार्दन सिंह क्षेत्री

Minister for Land Management, Agriculture and Cooperatives of Madhesh Province
- Incumbent
- Assumed office 18 July 2024
- Chief Minister: Satish Kumar Singh

Provincial Assembly Member of Madhesh Province
- Incumbent
- Assumed office 2022
- Preceded by: Prahlad Giri Goswami
- Constituency: Parsa 3(B)

Personal details
- Party: Nepali Congress
- Occupation: Politician

Janardan Singh Chhetri (Nepali: जनार्दन सिंह क्षेत्री) is a Nepalese politician belonging to Nepali Congress and the current Minister for Land Management, Agriculture and Cooperatives of Madhesh Province.

Chhetri is a member of Provincial Assembly of Madhesh Province. He was elected via 2022 Nepalese provincial elections from Parsa 3(B).

== Electoral history ==
=== 2022 Madhesh Provincial Assembly election ===
Parsa 3(B)
Party	Candidate	Votes
Nepali Congress	Janardan Singh Chhetri	10,172
People's Socialist Party Nepal	Madhu Gupta	7,496
CPN (US)	Prahlad Giri Goswami	6,503
Result	Congress gain	
Source: Election Commission
