= Ramakant Prasad Chaurasiya =

Nepalese politician

Honourable Ramakant Prasad Chaurasiya
- रामाकान्त प्रसाद चौरसिया

Member of Parliament, Pratinidhi Sabha
- Incumbent
- Assumed office 26 March 2026
- Preceded by: Raj Kumar Gupta
- Constituency: Parsa 3

Personal details
- Born: 18 July 1968 (age 58) Birgunj, Parsa, Nepal
- Citizenship: Nepalese
- Party: Rastriya Swatantra Party (2025 – present)
- Other political affiliations: Nepali Congress
- Parent: Gaya Prasad Chaurasiya (father)
- Profession: Politician

Ramakant Prasad Chaurasiya (Nepali: रामाकान्त प्रसाद चौरसिया) is a Nepalese politician and currently serves as a member of parliament for the Rastriya Swatantra Party. He is a member of the 7th Pratinidhi Sabha, elected from the Parsa 3 constituency in the 2026 Nepalese General Election, securing 29,679 votes and defeating Surendra Prasad Chaudhary of the Nepali Congress.

== Early and personal life ==
Chaurasiya was born in Birgunj, Parsa on July 18, 1968. He was born to Gaya Prasad Chaurasiya. He completed his secondary education in India. He was involved in his father's hardware business at a very early age. He co-founded a firm named Mona Construction with his uncle in 1999. He also served as president of the Federation of Contractors' Associations of Parsa district for 9 years.

== Politics ==
He joined Nepali Congress after being influenced by his uncle and served as a provincial committee member. After Nepalese Gen Z protests, he left the Nepali Congress and joined the Rastriya Swatantra Party in 2025. He secured a party ticket to contest the 2026 Nepalese general election from Parsa 3 and won the election by receiving 29,679 votes, with a margin of 13,313 votes.

== Electoral performance ==
Election	Year	Constituency	Contested for	Political party	Result	Votes	% of votes	Ref.
Nepal general election	2026	Parsa 3	Pratinidhi Sabha member	Rastriya Swatantra Party	Won	29,679	47.58%	
