= Jagarnath =

Jagarnath is both a given name and a surname. Notable people with the name include:

- Jagarnath Mahto (1967–2023), Indian politician
- Ravin Jagarnath (fl. from 2024), Mauritian politician

== See also ==
- Jagarnathpur Sira
- Jagarnathpur Rural Municipality
