= Rajeshwor Prasad Sah =

Nepalese politician

Honourable Rajeshwor Prasad Sah
- राजेश्वर प्रसाद साह

Province Assembly Member of Madhesh Province
- Incumbent
- Assumed office 2017
- Preceded by: N/A
- Constituency: Parsa 2 (constituency)

Personal details
- Born: April 12, 1976 (age 49)
- Party: Nepali Congress
- Occupation: Politician

Rajeshwor Prasad Sah (Nepali: राजेश्वर प्रसाद साह) is a Nepalese politician. He is a member of Provincial Assembly of Madhesh Province from Nepali Congress. Sah, a resident of Bahudarmai, was elected via 2017 Nepalese provincial elections from Parsa 2(A).

== Electoral history ==
=== 2017 Nepalese provincial elections ===
Party	Candidate	Votes
Nepali Congress	Rajeshwor Prasad Sah	10,259
Federal Socialist Forum, Nepal	Ram Naresh Prasad Yadav	10,079
CPN (Unified Marxist–Leninist)	Ram Chandra Sah Teli	5,057
Others		574
Invalid votes		1,085
Result	Congress gain	
Source: Election Commission
