= Bhauratar =

Bhauratar भौराटार
- Village development committee
- Location in Nepal
- Coordinates: 27.10°N 84.83°E
- Country: Nepal
- Zone: Narayani Zone
- District: Parsa District

Population (2011)
  - Total: 9,233
- Time zone: UTC+5:45 (Nepal Time)

Bhauratar is a village development committee in Parsa District in the Narayani Zone of southern Nepal.

== Demographics ==
At the time of the 2011 Nepal census it had a population of 9,233 people living in 1,333 households. 4,863 males and 4,370 females lived there.

== Geography ==
The neighbouring villages are Gamariya, Bishrampur, Chhapkaiya and Phoolkawal belongs to Bahudarmai nagarpalika. The chhapkaiya tola and Phoolkawal previously belonged to the committee. After municipalities were created, these villages belonged to Bahudarmai Municipalities.

== Notables ==
- Mr. Sighasan (mayor)
- Mr. Nitendra former mayor)
- Dr. Abhishesh Kumar Mehata medical researcher working in drug delivery and cancer nanomedicine He completed his M.Pharm. from Indian Institute of Technology (BHU), Varanasi. He worked for Apotex Bangaluru and Sun Pharmaceutical Industries Ltd (formerly: Ranbaxy Laboratories), Gurugram Haryana. He has completed his Ph.D. Department of Pharmaceutical Engineering and Technology, IIT BHU. He is among the world's top 2% of scientists as per Stanford University.
