= Auraha =

Auraha औरही
- Village development committee
- Location in Nepal
- Coordinates: 27.12°N 84.76°E
- Country: Nepal
- Zone: Narayani Zone
- District: Parsa District

Population (2011)
  - Total: 5,392
- Time zone: UTC+5:45 (Nepal Time)

Auraha is a village development committee in Parsa District in the Narayani Zone of southern Nepal. At the time of the 2011 Nepal census, it had a population of 5,392 people living in 809 individual households.

There are many temples in this village including shiv mandir, Krishna mandir and Durga mandir etc., there are many cultural festivals in Dashain. The new industrial area SHEJ is constructing new factories and industries.
