= Singhasan Sah Kalwar =

Nepalese politician

Honourable Singhasan Sah Kalwar
- सिंगासन साह कलवार
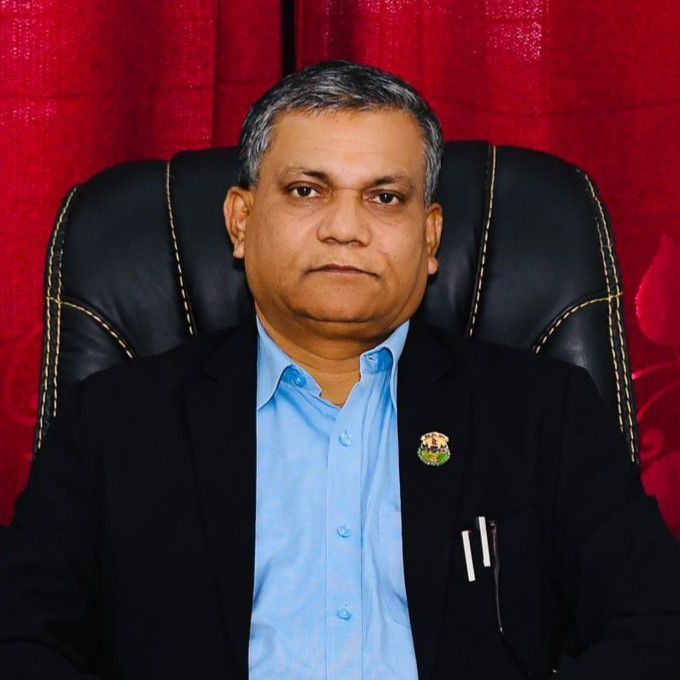

Province Assembly Member of Madhesh Province
- Incumbent
- Assumed office 2017
- Preceded by: N/A
- Constituency: Parsa 4 (constituency)

Personal details
- Born: July 6, 1965 (age 60)
- Party: People's Socialist Party, Nepal
- Occupation: Politician

Singhasan Sah Kalwar (Nepali: सिंगासन साह कलवार) is a Nepalese politician. He is a member of Provincial Assembly of Madhesh Province from People's Socialist Party, Nepal. Kalwar, a resident of Chhipahrmai Rural Municipality, was elected via 2017 Nepalese provincial elections from Parsa 4(B).

== Electoral history ==
=== 2017 Nepalese provincial elections ===
Party	Candidate	Votes
Federal Socialist Forum, Nepal	Singhasan Sah Kalwar	11,708
Nepali Congress	Bashishta Narayan Prasad Kurmi	6,027
CPN (Maoist Centre)	Suresh Prasad Kurmi	4,589
Nepal Federal Socialist Party	Mohammad Nasrullah Miya	3,750
Others		893
Invalid votes		1,187
Result	FSFN gain	
Source: Election Commission
