= Padam Giri =

Nepali politician

- पदम गिरि

Minister of Law, Justice and Parliamentary Affairs of Nepal
- In office 6 March 2024 – 3 July 2024
- President: Ram Chandra Poudel
- Prime Minister: Pushpa Kamal Dahal
- Preceded by: Dhanraj Gurung
- Succeeded by: Ajay Chaurasiya

Minister of Health and Population of Nepal
- In office 17 January 2023 – 27 February 2023
- President: Bidhya Devi Bhandari
- Prime Minister: Pushpa Kamal Dahal
- Preceded by: Bhawani Prasad Khapung
- Succeeded by: Mohan Bahadur Basnet

Member of Parliament, Pratinidhi Sabha
- In office 4 March 2018 – 12 September 2025
- Preceded by: Arjun Prasad Joshi
- Succeeded by: Sagar Bhusal
- Constituency: Parbat 1

Personal details
- Born: 11 March 1977 (age 49) Durlung, Kingdom of Nepal
- Party: CPN (UML)

Padam Giri (Nepali: पदम गिरि) is a Nepali communist politician and a former member of the House of Representatives of the federal parliament of Nepal. He was elected from Parbat District representing CPN UML under the first-past-the-post system in the 2017 legislative election. He defeated his nearest rival, Arjun Prasad Joshi of Nepali Congress, by acquiring 39,275 votes to Joshi's 26,819. Giri served as the Minister of Health and Population from 17 January 2023 to 27 February 2023.

== Early life and education ==
Padam Giri was born in Durlung, Parbat district of Nepal, in 2033 BS (1976 AD). He completed his early education in his hometown before pursuing higher studies. Giri obtained a master's degree in sociology, further enriching his understanding of societal dynamics and contributing to his leadership skills.

== Political Life ==
Giri began his political journey in 1993 during his time at Prithvi Narayan Campus in Pokhara, where he joined the All Nepal National Free Student Union (ANNFSU). In 1997, he served as the secretary of the CPN UML Durlung Village Committee, marking his early involvement in local politics. He eventually became a member of the Initial Committee of ANNFSU at Prithvi Narayan Campus and in 2000, he was appointed Chairman of the Initial Committee of ANNFSU, demonstrating his leadership skills within the student community.

Giri's commitment to student activism led him to become vice-chairman for the second time in the Free Student's Union in 2002. He was elected president of the Free Student's Union at Prithvi Narayan Campus, showcasing his popularity and support among fellow students. Giri's dedication to the CPN UML party led to his appointment as a member of the Parbat District Committee Secretariat in 2010.

He achieved a significant milestone in his political career by being elected as chairman from the eighth district convention of Parbat. In 2017, Giri entered the Federal Parliament, House of Representatives, for the first time after defeating Arjun Joshi of Nepali Congress from Parbat, marking his transition to national politics. In 2018, he became a member of the UML Gandaki Committee and also served as the Central Member and Parbat District Co-incharge from the 10th National Convention of the CPN UML.

In 2022, Giri secured re-election to the federal parliament after defeating Arjun Joshi for the second time. He was appointed as the minister of health and population. However, Giri resigned from his ministerial post when the ruling coalition broke up, serving in the position for only 45 days.

On 4 March 2024, he was reappointed as a minister following a cabinet reshuffle from a newly formed coalition. Giri currently serves as a minister of law, justice and parliamentary affairs.
