= Parbat 1 =

Parliamentary constituency in Nepal

- Parliamentary constituency for the House of Representatives
- Parbat 1in Gandaki Province

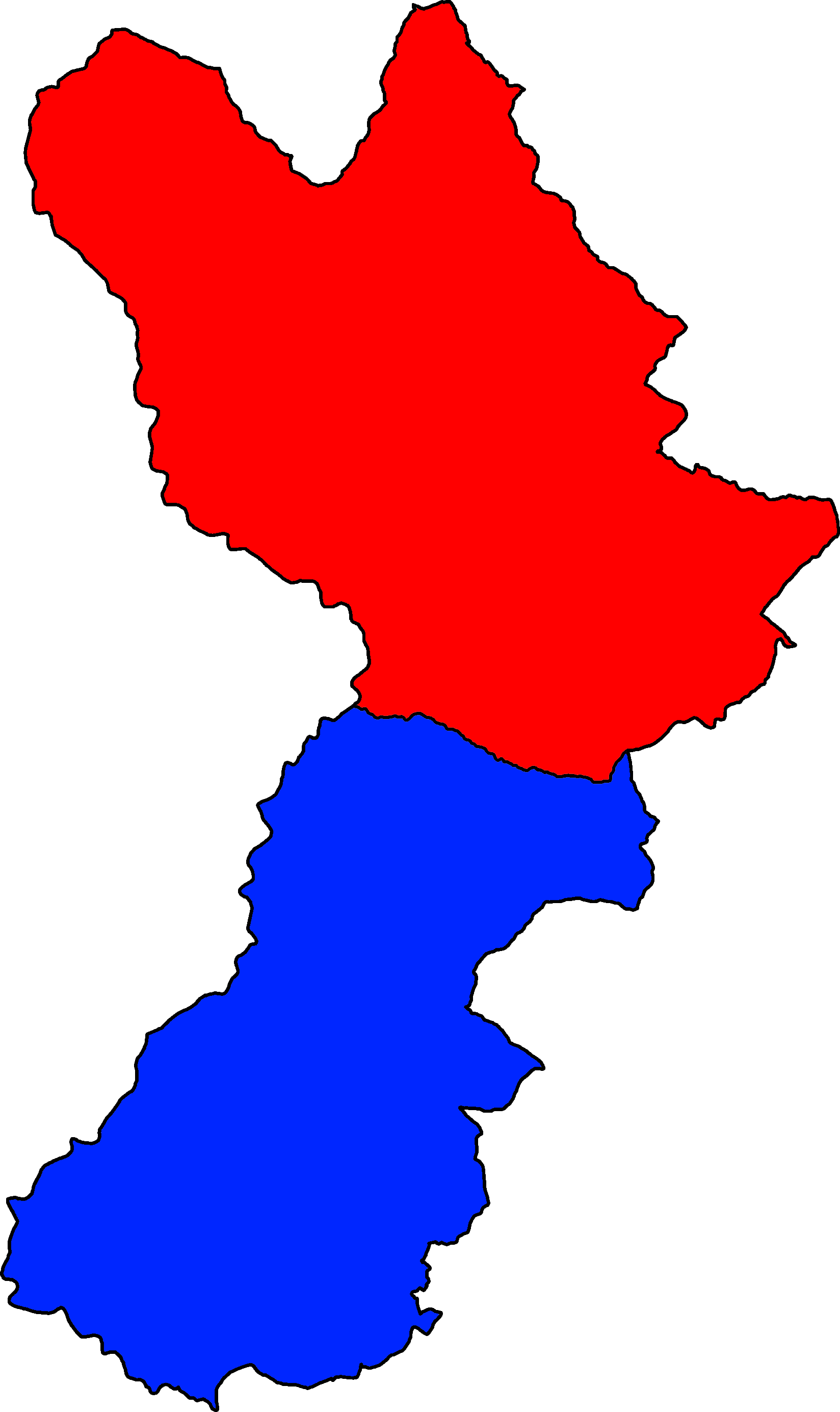
- Assembly segments Parbat 1(A) and Parbat 1(B) within Parbat District
- Province: Gandaki Province
- District: Parbat District
- Electorate: 107,300

Current constituency
- Created: 1991
- Party: Rastriya Swatantra Party
- MP: Sagar Bhusal
- Gandaki MPA 1(A): Netra Nath Adhikari (NCP)
- Gandaki MPA 1(B): Bikas Lamsal (NCP)

Parbat 1 is the parliamentary constituency of Parbat District in Nepal. This constituency came into existence on the Constituency Delimitation Commission (CDC) report submitted on 31 August 2017.

== Incorporated areas ==
Parbat 1 incorporates the entirety of Parbat District.

== Assembly segments ==
It encompasses the following Gandaki Provincial Assembly segment

- Parbat 1(A)
- Parbat 1(B)

== Members of Parliament ==
=== Parliament/Constituent Assembly ===
Election	Member	Party
1991	Krishna Prasad Bhattarai	CPN (Unified Marxist–Leninist)
1994	Indu Sharma Paudel	Nepali Congress
1999	Arjun Prasad Joshi	Nepali Congress
2017	Padam Giri	CPN (Unified Marxist–Leninist)
May 2018	Padam Giri	Nepal Communist Party
March 2021	Padam Giri	CPN (Unified Marxist–Leninist)
2026	Sagar Bhusal	Rastriya Swatantra Party

=== Provincial Assembly ===
==== 1(A) ====
Election	Member	Party
2017	Netra Nath Adhikari	CPN (Maoist Centre)
May 2018	Netra Nath Adhikari	Nepal Communist Party

==== 1(B) ====
Election	Member	Party
2017	Bikas Lamsal	CPN (Unified Marxist-Leninist)
May 2018	Bikas Lamsal	Nepal Communist Party

== Election results ==
=== Election in the 2020s ===
==== 2022 general election ====
Candidate	Party	Votes	%
Padam Giri	CPN (UML)	29,872	46.88
Arjun Prasad Joshi	Nepali Congress	27,609	43.33
Jal Bahadur Purja Pun	Rastriya Swatantra Party	4,173	6.55
Deepak Bahadur Malla	Rastriya Prajatantra Party	1,034	1.62
Others		1,028	1.61
Total		63,716	100.00
Majority		2,263	
CPN (UML) hold			

==== 2022 provincial election ====
===== 1(A) =====
Candidate	Party	Votes	%
Bhakta Bahadur Kunwar	CPN (UML)	16,825	45.75
Sudip Kunwar	CPN (Maoist Centre)	14,427	39.23
Prem Kumar Gurung	Rastriya Prajatantra Party	2,761	7.51
Kamal Raj Paudel	Nepali Congress (B.P.)	1,082	2.94
Others	1,681	4.57	
Total		36,776	100.00
Majority		2,398	
CPN (UML)			

===== 1(B) =====
Candidate	Party	Votes	%
Mitralal Basyal	CPN (UML)	14,132	51.39
Rishikesh Tiwari	Nepali Congress	12,210	44.40
Others	1,159	4.21	
Total		27,501	100.00
Majority		1,922	
CPN (UML)			

=== Election in the 2010s ===
==== 2017 legislative elections ====
Party	Candidate	Votes
CPN (Unified Marxist–Leninist)	Padam Giri	39,275
Nepali Congress	Arjun Prasad Joshi	26,819
Others		1,488
Invalid votes		2,281
Result	CPN (UML) gain	
Source: Election Commission

==== 2017 Nepalese provincial elections ====
===== 1(A) =====
Party	Candidate	Votes
Communist Party of Nepal (Maoist Centre)	Netra Nath Adhikari	21,508
Nepali Congress	Nawaraj Gurung	16,685
Others		534
Invalid votes		624
Result	Maoist Centre gain	
Source: Election Commission

===== 1(B) =====
Party	Candidate	Votes
CPN (Unified Marxist–Leninist)	Bikas Lamsal	15,434
Nepali Congress	Rajendra Prasad Tiwari	13,352
Others		798
Invalid votes		802
Result	CPN (UML) gain	
Source: Election Commission

==== 2013 Constituent Assembly election ====
Party	Candidate	Votes
Nepali Congress	Arjun Prasad Joshi	12,838
CPN (Unified Marxist–Leninist)	Ganesh Prasad Timilsina	11,123
UCPN (Maoist)	Netra Nath Adhikari	6,993
Others		2,076
Result	Congress hold	
Source: NepalNews

=== Election in the 2000s ===
==== 2008 Constituent Assembly election ====
Party	Candidate	Votes
Nepali Congress	Arjun Prasad Joshi	13,258
CPN (Maoist)	Manrupa Sharma Subedi	12,082
CPN (Unified Marxist–Leninist)	Ganesh Sharma Paudel	11,253
CPN (Marxist–Leninist)	Bishnu Prasad Bhattarai	1,468
Others		2,516
Invalid votes		1,298
Result	Congress hold	
Source: Election Commission

=== Election in the 1990s ===
==== 1999 legislative elections ====
Party	Candidate	Votes
Nepali Congress	Arjun Prasad Joshi	18,683
CPN (Unified Marxist–Leninist)	Juddha Bahadur Gurung	10,724
Rastriya Prajatantra Party	Chhetra Bahadur Gurung	5,221
Rastriya Prajatantra Party (Chand)	Devendra Bikram Mahat	2,420
CPN (Marxist–Leninist)	Ganesh Sharma Paudel	2,091
Others		736
Invalid Votes		862
Result	Congress hold	
Source: Election Commission

==== 1994 legislative elections ====
Party	Candidate	Votes
Nepali Congress	Indu Sharma Paudel	13,621
CPN (Unified Marxist–Leninist)	Yam Bahadur Gurung	12,769
Rastriya Prajatantra Party	Chhetra Bahadur Gurung	4,718
Independent	Dambar Bahadur Malla	3,741
Others		152
Result	Congress gain	
Source: Election Commission

==== 1991 legislative elections ====
Party	Candidate	Votes
CPN (Unified Marxist–Leninist)	Krishna Prasad Bhattarai	14,196
Nepali Congress		12,395
Result	CPN (UML) gain	

== See also ==
- List of parliamentary constituencies of Nepal
