= Shankar Prasad Chaudhary =

Nepalese politician

Honourable Shankar Prasad Chaudhary
- शंकर प्रसाद चौधरी

Province Assembly Member of Madhesh Province
- Incumbent
- Assumed office 2017
- Preceded by: N/A
- Constituency: Parsa 4 (constituency)

Personal details
- Born: October 23, 1960 (age 65)
- Party: Nepali Congress
- Occupation: Politician

Shankar Prasad Chaudhary (Nepali: शंकर प्रसाद चौधरी) is a Nepalese politician and a member of Provincial Assembly of Madhesh Province belonging to Nepali Congress. Chaudhary, a resident of Jirabhawani Rural Municipality, was elected via 2017 Nepalese provincial elections from Parsa 4(A).

== Personal life ==
Chaudhary was born on 23 October 1960 to father Satyanarayan Mahato and mother Lodari Devi.

== Electoral history ==
=== 2017 Nepalese provincial elections ===
Party	Candidate	Votes
Nepali Congress	Shankar Prasad Chaudhary	7,488
CPN (Unified Marxist–Leninist)	Jay Prakash Tharu	7,040
Rastriya Janata Party Nepal	Ram Chandra Pandit	5,120
Others		3,669
Invalid votes		1,458
Result	Congress gain	
Source: Election Commission
