= Abdul Rahim Ansari =

Nepalese politician

Honourable Abdul Rahim Ansari
- अब्दुल रहिम अंसारी

Province Assembly Member of Madhesh Province
- In office 2017–2022
- Preceded by: N/A
- Constituency: Parsa 3 (constituency)

Personal details
- Born: April 12, 1978 (age 48)
- Party: People's Socialist Party, Nepal
- Occupation: Politician

Abdul Rahim Ansari (Nepali: अब्दुल रहिम अंसारी) is a Nepalese politician. He is a former member of Provincial Assembly of Madhesh Province belonging to the People's Socialist Party, Nepal. Ansari, a resident of Sakhuwa Prasauni Rural Municipality, was elected via 2017 Nepalese provincial elections from Parsa 3(A) constituency. He garnered 7,004 votes during the election.

== Personal life ==
Ansari was born on 12 April 1978 to father Chaughur Miya and mother Nirbani Khatun.

== Electoral history ==
=== 2017 Nepalese provincial elections ===
Party	Candidate	Votes
Federal Socialist Forum, Nepal	Abdul Rahim Ansari	7,004
Nepali Congress	Chanda Kishor Prasad	6,845
CPN (Unified Marxist–Leninist)	Nagendra Prasad Chaudhary	5,986
Nepal Federal Socialist Party	Shriram Giri	4,284
Others		1,541
Invalid votes		1,467
Result	FSFN gain	
Source: Election Commission
