= Bhedihari =

Bhedihari Model V. D. C. भेडिहरी
- Village development committee
- Location in Nepal
- Coordinates: 27.05°N 84.72°E
- Country: Nepal
- Zone: Narayani Zone
- District: Parsa District

Population (2011)
  - Total: 5,772
- Time zone: UTC+5:45 (Nepal Time)

Bhedihari is a village in the Parsa District of the Narayani Zone, southern Nepal. At the time of the 2011 Nepal census it had a population of 5,772 people living in 846 individual households. There were 2,977 males and 2,795 females at the time of census.

Formerly, Bhedihari was a village development committee (VDC), which were local-level administrative units. In 2017, the government of Nepal restructured local government in line with the 2015 constitution and VDCs were discontinued. It is currently a part of Kalikamai Rural Municipality.
