= Chak 111/1L =

Chak No 111/1L
- Village
- Location within Pakistan
- Coordinates: 28°10′N 70°42′E
- Country: Pakistan
- Province: Punjab
- District: Rahim Yar Khan
- Tehsil: Khanpur
- Time zone: UTC+5 (PST)

Chak 111/1L is a village in Punjab, Pakistan. It is located about 18 kilometres (11 mi) south of Rahim Yar Khan. This village is situated in Union Council 45, Khanpur Katora in the Rahim Yar Khan District.

== About ==
Mostly there are Mangrio family and also some other castes live here like Chania Mahar, Kamboh Punjabi and Meer. Some non-Muslim Thori also exist here. The Numberdar of this village belong to Mangrio family. The previous Numberdar of this chak was Hazor Buksh and now his son Mehr Dein. Haji Shah Muhammad, LaL Bukhsh, Peer Buksh, Khair Dein, Allah Buksh,Imam Dein, Allah Dein,Muhammad Murad, Ruken Dein, Faqeer Buksh, Ghulam Sarwar and Ghulam Nabi, Gull Hassan and Most senior persons of this village Muhammad Imran Mangrio. They are landlords and businessman.

== Culture ==
The village culture is Sindhi and Punjabi. As people are Muslim by birth and faith.

== Education ==
The village has one government and two private schools. There is also a religious institute and a mosque in this village.

== Crops and irrigation ==
The main crops of the village are sugar cane, cotton, oil seeds and pulses while wheat being the major food crop. There are also orange and Mango orchards in the village.

== Manpower ==
Agriculture is the main occupation of about 90 percent of the village's population. The remainder serve in government institutions, forces, technical and business sectors.
