= Charani =

Coordinates: 27.3000°N 84.8400°E

Charani चरानी
- Village development committee
- Interactive map of Charani
- Country: Nepal
- Zone: Narayani Zone
- District: Parsa District

Population (1991)
  - Total: 5,785
- Time zone: UTC+5:45 (Nepal Time)

Charani (Nepali: चरानी) is a village development committee in Parsa District in the Narayani Zone of southern Nepal. At the time of the 1991 Nepal census it had a population of 5785 people living in 925 individual households.
