= Supauli =

Coordinates: 27.1667°N 84.7333°E

Supauli सुपौली
- Village development committee
- Interactive map of Supauli
- Country: Nepal
- Zone: Narayani Zone
- District: Parsa District

Population (1991)
  - Total: 2,352
- Time zone: UTC+5:45 (Nepal Time)

Supauli is a village development committee in Parsa District in the Narayani Zone of southern Nepal. At the time of the 1991 Nepal census it had a population of 2352.
