= Ramesh Rijal =

Nepalese politician

Honourable Ramesh Rijal
- रमेश रिजाल

Minister of Industry, Commerce and Supplies of Nepal
- In office 31 March 2023 – 4 March 2024
- President: Ram Chandra Poudel
- Prime Minister: Pushpa Kamal Dahal
- Preceded by: Damodar Bhandari
- Succeeded by: Damodar Bhandari

Member of Parliament, Pratinidhi Sabha
- In office 22 December 2022 – 12 September 2025
- Preceded by: Laxman Lal Karna
- Succeeded by: Tek Bahadur Shakya
- Constituency: Parsa 4

Personal details
- Born: 4 March 1957 (age 69) Parsa District
- Party: Nepali Congress
- Spouse: Shobha Kumari Sharma
- Parent: Meghraj Upadhyaya (father)

Ramesh Rijal is a Nepalese politician, belonging to the Nepali Congress currently serving as a member of the 2nd Federal Parliament of Nepal. In the 2022 Nepalese general election, he won the election from Parsa 4 (constituency).
