= Gamhariya =

Gamhariya may refer to:

- Gamhariya (community development block), Madhepura district, Bihar, India
- Gamhariya, Parsa, a village development committee in Parsa District, Narayani Zone, Nepal
- Gamhariya, Sarlahi, a village development committee in Sarlahi District, Janakpur Zone, Nepal
