= Sedhawa =

Sedhawa सेधवा
- Village development committee
- Location in Nepal
- Coordinates: 27.19°N 84.72°E
- Country: Nepal
- Zone: Narayani Zone
- District: Parsa District

Population (2011)
  - Total: 3,266
- Time zone: UTC+5:45 (Nepal Time)

Sedhawa is a village development committee in Parsa District in the Narayani Zone of southern Nepal. At the time of the 2011 Nepal census it had a population of 3,266 people living in 609 individual households. There were 1,590 males and 1,676 females at the time of census.
