= Ghore =

Coordinates: 27.3000°N 84.8400°E

Dhore धाेरे
- Village development committee
- Interactive map of Dhore
- Country: Nepal
- Zone: Narayani Zone
- District: Parsa District

Population (2011)
  - Total: 4,804
- Time zone: UTC+5:45 (Nepal Time)

Dhore is a village development committee in Parsa District in the Narayani Zone of southern Nepal. At the time of the 2011 Nepal census it had a population of 4804 people living in 726 individual households. There were 2,471 males and 2,333 females at the time of census.
