= Bina Jaiswal =

Nepalese politician

Honourable Beena Jaiswal Kurmi
- बीना जैसवाल कुर्मी

Member of Parliament, Pratinidhi Sabha
- In office 2022–2025
- Constituency: PR list

Personal details
- Born: 5 March 1990 (age 36)
- Party: Rastriya Prajatantra Party
- Other political affiliations: Rastriya Prajatantra Party
- Spouse: Raj Pratap Singh
- Children: Aayra Patel (elder) Yasha Patel (younger)
- Parents: Binod Kumar Jaiswal(Father)/ Jagannath Prasad Kurmi -inlaws (father); Pramshila Devi(Mother)/ Kalawati Devi -inlaws (mother)

Beena Jaiswal Kurmi is a Nepalese politician, belonging to the Rastriya Prajatantra Party. She has served as a member of the 2nd Federal Parliament of Nepal. In the 2022 Nepalese general election she was elected as a proportional representative from the Madheshi people category but right after 2025 Nepalese Gen Z protests and dissolution of 2nd Federal Parliament of Nepal. She contested for 2026 Nepalese general election from Parsa 2 but defeated. she is currently elected as district president of party and serving as a president of Parsa district from Rastriya prajatantra party
