= Tulsi Barba =

Coordinates: 27°3′N 84°41′E

Tulsi Barba तुलसी बर्बा
- Village development committee
- Interactive map of Tulsi Barba
- Country: Nepal
- Zone: Narayani Zone
- District: Parsa District

Population (2011)
  - Total: 4,314
- Time zone: UTC+5:45 (Nepal Time)

Tulsi Barba is a village development committee in Parsa District in the Narayani Zone of southern Nepal. At the time of the 2011 Nepal census it had a population of 4,314 people living in 662 individual households. There were 2,187 males and 2,127 females at the time of census.
