= Harpur, Parsa =

Harpur हरपुर
- Village development committee
- Location in Nepal
- Coordinates: 27.16°N 84.86°E
- Country: Nepal
- Zone: Narayani Zone
- District: Parsa District

Population (1991)
  - Total: 4,176
- Time zone: UTC+5:45 (Nepal Time)

Harpur is a village development committee in Parsa District in the Narayani Zone of southern Nepal. At the time of the 1991 Nepal census it had a population of 4176 people living in 665 individual households.
