= Amarpatti, Parsa =

Place in Nepal

Coordinates: 27°0′N 84°48′E

Amarpatti अमरपट्टी
- Village development committee
- Interactive map of Amarpatti
- Country: Nepal
- Zone: Narayani Zone
- District: Parsa District

Population (2011)
  - Total: 4,971
- Time zone: UTC+5:45 (Nepal Time)

Amarpatti is a village development committee in Parsa District in the Narayani Zone of southern Nepal. At the time of the 2011 Nepal census it had a population of 4,971 people living in 705 individual households.
