= Bageshwari, Parsa =

Coordinates: 27.3000°N 84.8400°E

Bageshwari बागेश्वरी
- Village development committee
- Interactive map of Bageshwari
- Country: Nepal
- Zone: Narayani Zone
- District: Parsa District

Population (2011)
  - Total: 6,668
- Time zone: UTC+5:45 (Nepal Time)

Bageshwari is a village development committee in Parsa District in the Narayani Zone of southern Nepal. At the time of the 2011 Nepal census it had a population of 6,668 people living in 997 individual households.
