= Lipani Birta =

Lipani Birta लिपानी बिर्ता
- Village development committee
- Location in Nepal
- Coordinates: 27.08°N 84.92°E
- Country: Nepal
- Zone: Narayani Zone
- District: Parsa District

Population (2011)
  - Total: 6,938
- Time zone: UTC+5:45 (Nepal Time)

Lipani Birta is a village development committee in Parsa District in the Narayani Zone of southern Nepal. At the time of the 2011 Nepal census it had a population of 6,938 people living in 970 individual households. There were 3,695 males and 3,243 females at the time of census.
