= Prasauni Birta =

Prasauni Birta प्रसौनी बिर्ता
- Currently Prasauni Birta, Birgunj Metropolitan City 23, Parsa Before Prasauni Birta, Village Development Committee 7, Parsa
- Location in Nepal
- Coordinates: 27.04°N 84.88°E
- Country: Nepal
- Zone: Narayani Zone
- District: Parsa District

Population (2011)
  - Total: 5,001
- Time zone: UTC+5:45 (Nepal Time)

Prasauni Birta is a village development committee in Parsa District in the Narayani Zone of southern Nepal. The 2011 Nepal census reported a population of 5,001 people in 735 households.

A new constitution was enacted on 2074 B.S. (Prasauni Birta village development committee, Ward No.-7) changed to (Prasauni Birta, Birgunj Metropolitan City, Ward No.-23, Parsa). The central government gave rights to different 7 provinces(states) among them Birgunj Metropolitan City, which lies in Province No.2 named as (Madhesh) province.
