= Hariharpur, Parsa =

Hariharpur हरिहरपुर
- Village development committee
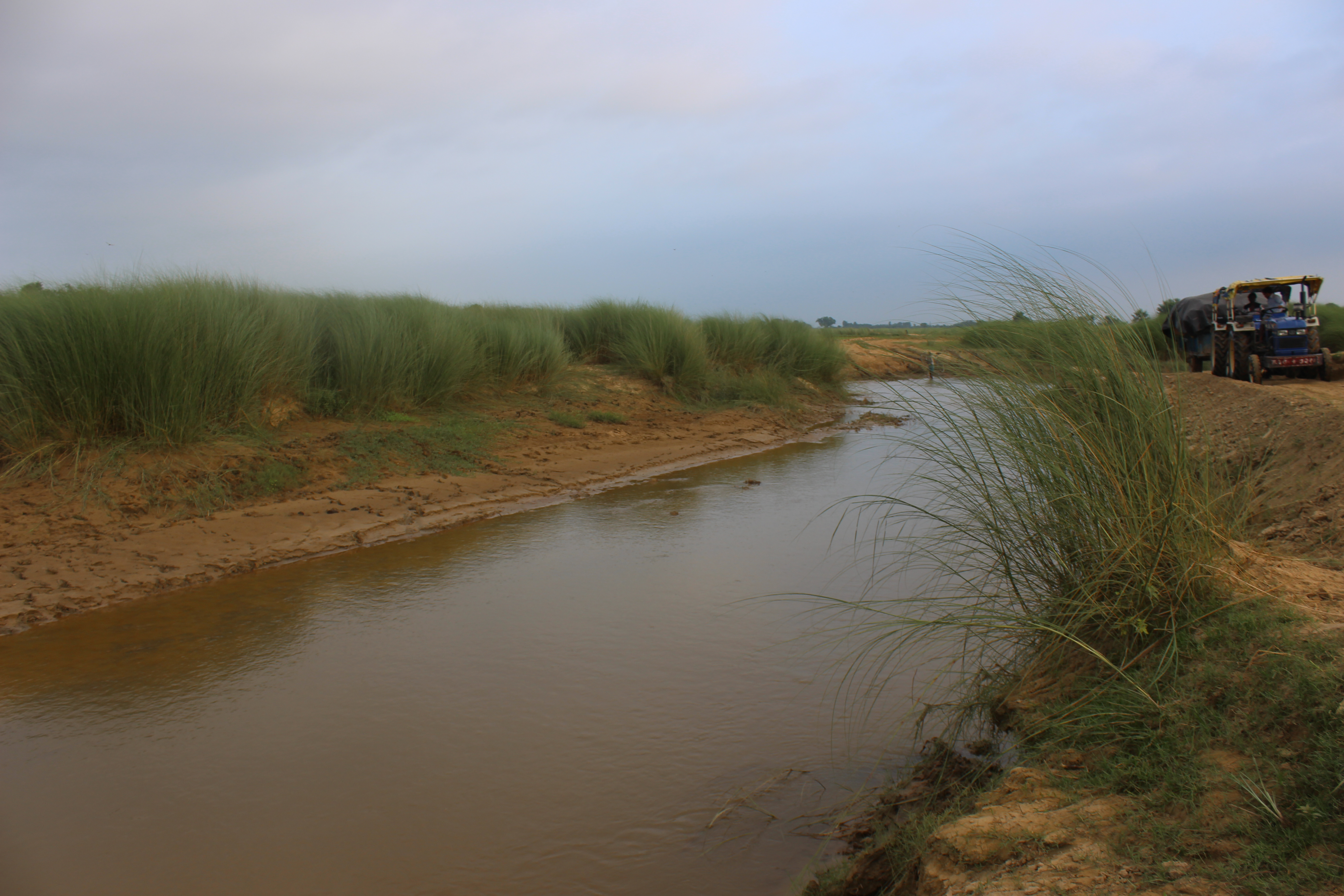
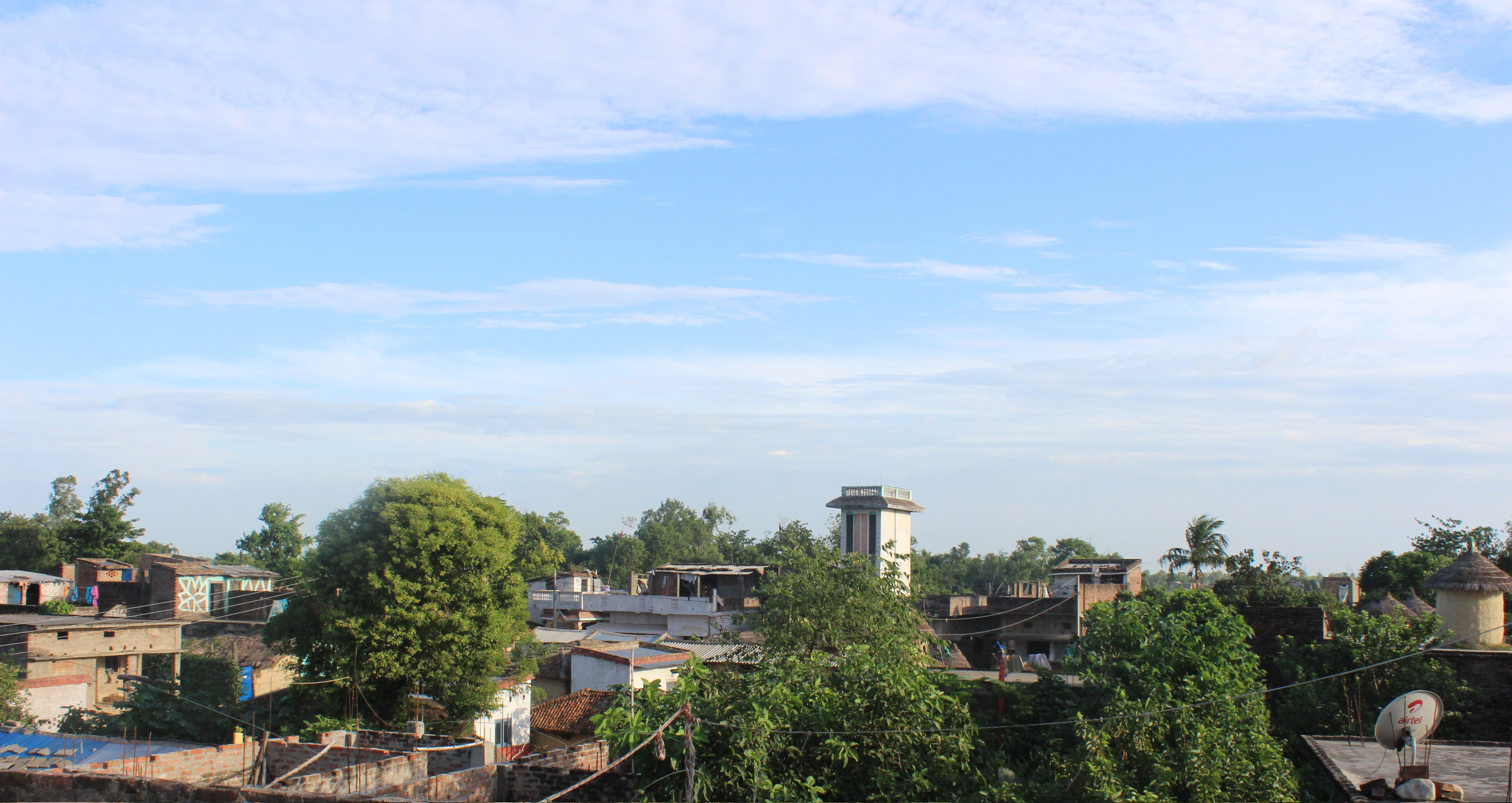
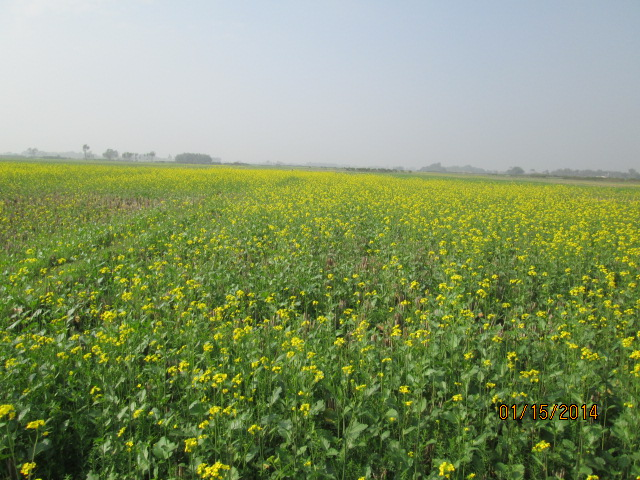
- Nickname: Land of Greenery

- Location in Nepal
- Coordinates: 27.10°N 84.70°E
- Country: Nepal
- Province: Province No. 2
- District: Parsa District

Government
  - Mayor: Madan Prasad Chauhan

Population (2015)
  - Total: 7,480
- Time zone: UTC+5:45 (Nepal Time)
  - Summer (DST): "

Hariharpur is a village development committee in Parsa District in the Narayani Zone of southern Nepal. At the time of the 2015 Nepal census it had a population of 7480 people living in 585 individual households.
