= Deukhana =

Coordinates: 27.13°N 84.80°E

Deurbana देउरवाना
- Village development committee
- Interactive map of Deurbana
- Country: Nepal
- Zone: Narayani Zone
- District: Parsa District

Population (2011)
  - Total: 4,866
- Time zone: UTC+5:45 (Nepal Time)

Deurbana is a village development committee in Parsa District in the Narayani Zone of southern Nepal. At the time of the 1991 Nepal census it had a population of 3260 people living in 534 individual households.
