= Madhuban Mathaul =

Madhuban Mathaul मधुवन मथौल
- Village development committee
- Location in Nepal
- Coordinates: 27.23°N 84.86°E
- Country: Nepal
- Zone: Narayani Zone
- District: Parsa District

Population (2011)
  - Total: 6,783
- Time zone: UTC+5:45 (Nepal Time)

Madhuban Mathaul is a village development committee in Parsa District in the Narayani Zone of southern Nepal. At the time of the 2011 Nepal census it had a population of 6,783 people living in 1246 individual households. There were 3,394 males and 3,389 females at the time of census.
