= Hariharpur Birta =

Hariharpur Birta हरिहरपुर बिर्ता
- Village development committee
- Location in Nepal
- Coordinates: 27.06°N 84.73°E
- Country: Nepal
- Zone: Narayani Zone
- District: Parsa District

Population (1991)
  - Total: 1,999
- Time zone: UTC+5:45 (Nepal Time)

Hariharpur Birta is a village development committee in Parsa District in the Narayani Zone of southern Nepal. At the time of the 1991 Nepal census it had a population of 1999 people living in 331 individual households.
