= Kauwa Ban Kataiya =

Kauwa Ban Kataiya कौवा बनकटैया
- Village development committee
- Location in Nepal
- Coordinates: 27.14°N 84.81°E
- Country: Nepal
- Zone: Narayani Zone
- District: Parsa District

Population (2011)
  - Total: 4,882
- Time zone: UTC+5:45 (Nepal Time)

Kauwa Ban Kataiya is a village development committee in Parsa District in the Narayani Zone of southern Nepal. At the time of the 2011 Nepal census it had a population of 4,882 people living in 431 individual households. There were 2,516 males and 2,366 females at the time of census.
