= Shiva Worga =

Shiva Worga शिव वोर्गा
- Village development committee
- Location in Nepal
- Coordinates: 27.08°N 84.78°E
- Country: Nepal
- Zone: Narayani Zone
- District: Parsa District

Population (2011)
  - Total: 6,491
- Time zone: UTC+5:45 (Nepal Time)

Shiva Worga is a village development committee in Parsa District in the Narayani Zone of southern Nepal. At the time of the 2011 Nepal census it had a population of 6,491 people living in 933 individual households. There were 3,384 males and 3,107 females at the time of census.
