= Harapatganj =

Harapatganj हरपतगञ्ज
- Village development committee
- Location in Nepal
- Coordinates: 27.05°N 84.87°E
- Country: Nepal
- Zone: Narayani Zone
- District: Parsa District

Population (1991)
  - Total: 3,054
- Time zone: UTC+5:45 (Nepal Time)

Harapatganj is a village development committee in Parsa District in the Narayani Zone of southern Nepal. At the time of the 1991 Nepal census it had a population of 3054.
