= Langadi =

Langadi लंगडी
- Rural Municipal (गाउँपालिका)
- Location in Nepal
- Coordinates: 27.09°N 84.71°E
- Country: Nepal
- Zone: Narayani Zone
- District: Parsa District

Population (2011)
  - Total: 3,421
- Time zone: UTC+5:45 (Nepal Time)

Langadi is a rural municipal in the Narayani Zone, located in the Parsa District of Nepal. As of the 2011 Nepal census, Langadi had a population of 3,421 people living in 525 individual households. There were 1,739 males and 1,682 females at the time of census. Madan Prasad chauhan (janta Samajbadi party) is chairman and Manju Devi(Nepali Congress) is sub-Chairman of Dhobini Rural Manucipality.
