= Sabaithawa =

Sabaithawa सबैथावा
- Village development committee
- Location in Nepal
- Coordinates: 27.04°N 84.71°E
- Country: Nepal
- Zone: Narayani Zone
- District: Parsa District

Population (2011)
  - Total: 4,487
- Time zone: UTC+5:45 (Nepal Time)

Sabaithawa is a village development committee in Parsa District in the Narayani Zone of southern Nepal. At the time of the 2011 Nepal census it had a population of 4,487 people living in 680 individual households. There were 2,273 males and 2,214 females at the time of census. There is an Arya Samaj Temple in the middle of the village. The land for the temple was donated by the then Pradhan Panch Bachan Prasad Chaurasiya. He is also the first president of Arya Samaj, Sabaithawa. He was the founder chairman of Parsa Bara Rautahat Cane Growers Association. He is initiator and core personality of the construction of 28 km road from Tihuki to Alau. When Panchayati System was promulgated by the then Royal government of Nepal, he became the first Pradhan Panch of Sabaithawa village Panchayat and continued for more than 25 years except a few terms. There is also a primary school and a health post to the west of the village. Credit goes to him for being instrumental in the construction of Health Post, Pnchayat Bhawan, 3 bridges, and Cane Sub-center Building. A dharmashala besides the road is under construction. One temple is ready and another is under construction.
