= Ramnagari =

Ramnagari रामनगरी
- Village development committee
- Location in Nepal
- Coordinates: 27.09°N 84.80°E
- Country: Nepal
- Zone: Narayani Zone
- District: Parsa District

Population (1991)
  - Total: 2,161
- Time zone: UTC+5:45 (Nepal Time)

Ramnagari is a village development committee in Parsa District in the Narayani Zone of southern Nepal. At the time of the 1991 Nepal census it had a population of 2161 people living in 410 individual households.
