= Basantpur, Parsa =

Village development committee in Narayani Zone, Nepal

Coordinates: 27°5′N 84°44′E

Basantpur (phulwariya) बसन्तपुर
- Village development committee
- Interactive map of Basantpur (phulwariya)
- Country: Nepal
- Zone: Narayani Zone
- District: Parsa District

Population (2011)
  - Total: 7,933
- Time zone: UTC+5:45 (Nepal Time)

Basantpur is a village development committee in Parsa District in the Narayani Zone of southern Nepal. At the time of the 2011 Nepal census it had a population of 7,933 people living in 1,157 individual households. There were 4,094 males and 3,839 females at the time of census.
