= Samjhauta =

Samjhauta सम्झौता
- Village development committee
- Location in Nepal
- Coordinates: 27.06°N 84.65°E
- Country: Nepal
- Zone: Narayani Zone
- District: Parsa District

Population (2011)
  - Total: 6,995
- Time zone: UTC+5:45 (Nepal Time)

Samjhauta is a village development committee in Parsa District in the Narayani Zone of southern Nepal. At the time of the 2011 Nepal census it had a population of 6,995 people living in 992 individual households. There were 3,617 males and 3,378 females at the time of census.

Samjhauta (1973 film) may also refer to an Indian Hindi film released in 1973.
