= Biruwa Guthi =

Coordinates: 27°10′N 84°53′E

Biruwa Guthi विरुवा गुठी
- Village development committee
- Interactive map of Biruwa Guthi
- Country: Nepal
- Zone: Narayani Zone
- District: Parsa District

Population (2011)
  - Total: 13,248
- Time zone: UTC+5:45 (Nepal Time)

Biruwa Guthi is a village development committee in Parsa District in the Narayani Zone of southern Nepal. At the time of the 2011 Nepal census it had a population of 13,248 people living in 2,350 individual households. There were 6,608 males and 6,640 females at the time of census.

name of villages of Biruwa Guthi

1. Ward No 2
1. Prasuram Pur
2. Sabaiya
3. sabaiya tadi

Ward No 1

1. Biruwa guthi
2. Ramtol
3. jhabrah(Jhapra)
4. Jhulitar

Ward No 5

1. Badnihar
2. pakadiya

Ward No 4

1. Barwa tadi
2. baknerwa

Ward No 9

1. Hardaspur

Ward No 8

1. chhotaili
