= Bisrampur =

Bisrampur विश्रामपुर
- Village development committee
- Location in Nepal
- Coordinates: 27.07°N 84.83°E
- Country: Nepal
- Zone: Narayani Zone
- District: Parsa District

Population (2011)
  - Total: 7,089
- Time zone: UTC+5:45 (Nepal Time)

Bisrampur is a village development committee in Parsa District, which is located in the Narayani Zone of southern Nepal. At the time of the 2011 Nepal census, it had a population of 7,089 people living in 985 individual households. There were 3,661 males and 3,428 females at the time of the census.
