= Bimal Prasad Shrivastav =

Nepalese politician

- बिमल प्रसाद श्रीवास्तव

Minister of Labour, Employment and Social Security
- In office 4 June 2021 – 22 June 2021
- President: Bidya Devi Bhandari
- Prime Minister: KP Sharma Oli
- Preceded by: Gauri Shankar Chaudhary
- Succeeded by: Krishna Kumar Shrestha

Member of Parliament, Pratinidhi Sabha
- Incumbent
- Assumed office 4 March 2018
- Preceded by: Bichari Prasad Yadav
- Constituency: Parsa 2

5th Mayor of Birgunj
- In office 1983–1989
- Preceded by: Gopal Prasad Pradhan
- Succeeded by: Madhava Lal Shrestha
- In office 1997–2002
- Preceded by: Madhava Lal Shrestha
- Succeeded by: Gopal Giri

Personal details
- Born: 20 December 1950 (age 75) Birgunj, Parsa District
- Party: Loktantrik Samajwadi
- Other political affiliations: Rastriya Janata Party Nepal; Nepal Loktantrik Forum; Federal Socialist Forum; People's Socialist Party

Bimal Prasad Shrivastav is a Nepalese politician and was Minister of Labour, Employment and Social Security of Government of Nepal since 4 June 2021 but was removed from the post by Supreme Court on 22 June 2021 making his tenure of just 18 days one of the shortest till date (the shortest being that of Raj Kishor Yadav). He was also serving as the Member Of House Of Representatives (Nepal) elected from Parsa-2, Province No. 2. Previously he had lost Birjunj Mayoral election as a candidate. He is the member of the Presidium of Federal Socialist Forum.
