= Lakhanpur, Parsa =

Lakhanpur लखनपुर
- Village development committee
- Location in Nepal
- Coordinates: 27.11°N 84.79°E
- Country: Nepal
- Zone: Narayani Zone
- District: Parsa District

Population (2011)
  - Total: 4,962
- Time zone: UTC+5:45 (Nepal Time)

Lakhanpur is a village development committee in Parsa District in the Narayani Zone of southern Nepal. At the time of the 2011 Nepal census it had a population of 4,962 people living in 757 individual households. There were 2,611 males and 2,351 females at the time of census.
