= Bagahi, Parsa =

Bagahi बगही
- Village development committee
- Location in Nepal
- Coordinates: 27.10°N 84.89°E
- Country: Nepal
- Zone: Narayani Zone
- District: Parsa District

Population (2011)
  - Total: 6,570
- Time zone: UTC+5:45 (Nepal Time)

Bagahi is a village development committee in Parsa District in the Narayani Zone of southern Nepal. At the time of the 2011 Nepal census it had a population of 6,570 people living in 964 individual households.
