= Pancharukhi =

Pancharukhi पञ्चरुखी
- Village development committee
- Location in Nepal
- Coordinates: 27.12°N 84.87°E
- Country: Nepal
- Zone: Narayani Zone
- District: Parsa District

Population (2011)
  - Total: 5,588
- Time zone: UTC+5:45 (Nepal Time)

Pancharukhi is a village development committee in Parsa District in the Narayani Zone of southern Nepal. At the time of the 2011 Nepal census it had a population of 5,588 people living in 792 individual households.
