= Beriya Birta =

Bairiya Birta बैरिया बिर्ता
- Village development committee
- Location in Nepal
- Coordinates: 27.06°N 84.84°E
- Country: Nepal
- Zone: Narayani Zone
- District: Parsa District

Population (2011)
  - Total: 5,213
- Time zone: UTC+5:45 (Nepal Time)

Bairiya Birta is a village development committee in Parsa District in the Narayani Zone of southern Nepal. At the time of the 2011 Nepal census it had a population of 5,213 people living in 800 individual households. There were 2,638 males and 2,575 females at the time of Nepal.
