= Mahuwan =

Mahuwan महुआँव
- Village development committee
- Location in Nepal
- Coordinates: 27.12°N 84.80°E
- Country: Nepal
- Zone: Narayani Zone
- District: Parsa District

Population (2011)
  - Total: 4,837
- Time zone: UTC+5:45 (Nepal Time)

Mahuwan is a village development committee in Parsa District in the Narayani Zone of southern Nepal. The village is surrounded by Ramnagari in South, Lakhanpur in West, Vouratar in East and Kauwaban Kataiya in North. At the time of the 2011 Nepal census it had a population of 4,837 people living in 761 individual households. There were 2,472 males and 2,365 females at the time of census. peoples are Hindu by relion besides two or more family of Muslim. Bhojpuri is the language commonly used. Parasnath is a historical temple of god shiva located at the centre of the village of the name of which the district Parsa was named.
