= Mirjapur, Parsa =

Mirjapur मिर्जापुर
- Village Development Committee
- Location in Nepal
- Coordinates: 27.08°N 84.67°E
- Country: Nepal
- Zone: Narayani Zone
- District: Parsa District

Population (2011)
  - Total: 4,229
- Time zone: UTC+5:45 (Nepal Time)

Mirjapur is a village development committee in Parsa District in the Narayani Zone of southern Nepal. At the time of the 2011 Nepal census, it had a population of 4,229 people living in 690 individual households. There were 2,189 males and 2,040 females at the time of the census. Mirjapur is the ward number 1 of the Chhipaharmai rural municipality.
