= Nirmal Basti =

Coordinates: 27°16′N 84°41′E

Nirmal Basti निर्मल बस्ती
- Village development committee
- Interactive map of Nirmal Basti
- Country: Nepal
- Zone: Narayani Zone
- District: Parsa District

Population (2011)
  - Total: 9,772
- Time zone: UTC+5:45 (Nepal Time)
- Postal code: 44300

Nirmal Basti is a Village Development Committee in Parsa District in the Narayani Zone of southern Nepal. At the time of the 2011 Nepal census, it had a population of 9772 people living in 2055 individual households. The sex ratio is 95.48, meaning there are slightly more females than males. For comparison, the Parsa District has an average sex ratio of 108.21
