= Bahuarba Bhatha =

Coordinates: 27°3′N 84°48′E

Bahuarwa Bhatha बहुअर्वा भाठा
- Village development committee
- Interactive map of Bahuarwa Bhatha
- Country: Nepal
- Zone: Narayani Zone
- District: Parsa District

Population (2011)
  - Total: 6,984
- Time zone: UTC+5:45 (Nepal Time)

Bahuarwa Bhatha is a village development committee in Parsa District in the Narayani Zone of southern Nepal. At the time of the 2011 Nepal census it had a population of 6,984 people living in 1,012 individual households. There were 3,634 males and 3,350 females at the time of census.
