= Nagardaha =

Coordinates: 27.09°N 84.84°E

Nagardaha नागरदह
- Village development committee
- Interactive map of Nagardaha
- Country: Nepal
- Zone: Narayani Zone
- District: Parsa District

Population (2011)
  - Total: 3,583
- Time zone: UTC+5:45 (Nepal Time)

Nagardaha is a village development committee in Parsa District in the Narayani Zone of southern Nepal. At the time of the 2011 Nepal census it had a population of 3,583 people living in 485 individual households.
