= Ajay Chaurasiya =

Nepalese politician

Ajay Kumar Chaurasiya
- अजय कुमार चौरसिया

Minister of Law, Justice and Parliamentary Affairs of Nepal
- In office 15 July 2024 – 9 September 2025
- President: Ram Chandra Poudel
- Prime Minister: KP Sharma Oli
- Preceded by: Padam Giri
- Succeeded by: Om Prakash Aryal

Member of Parliament, House of Representatvies
- In office 22 December 2022 – 12 September 2025
- Preceded by: Bimal Prasad Shrivastav
- Succeeded by: Sushil Kumar Kanu
- In office May 1999 – May 2002
- Preceded by: Ram Chandra Kushwaha
- Succeeded by: Ajay Kumar Dwivedi
- Constituency: Parsa 2

Member of 1st Nepalese Constituent Assembly
- In office 28 May 2008 – 28 May 2012
- Preceded by: Surendra Prasad Chaudhary
- Succeeded by: Raj Kumar Gupta
- Constituency: Parsa 3

Joint General Secretary of Nepali Congress
- Incumbent
- Assumed office 29 October 2026
- President: Gagan Thapa

Personal details
- Born: 3 February 1965 (age 61) Parsa District, Nepal
- Party: Nepali Congress

Ajay Kumar Chaurasiya (Nepali: अजय कुमार चौरसिया) is a Nepalese politician. He served as the Asst. Minister in the Ministry of Federal Affairs and Local Development from 2001-2002.

== Early life ==
He was born and raised in Amarpatti, Parsa, and completed his primary and secondary and higher education in Motihari, Bihar.

== Career ==
He is a politician from the Madhesh Province. He was a Member of Parliament from Nepali Congress in 1999, 2006, 2007 and 2022. He represents the Parsa District, Constituency 2, Birgunj Nepal.

In 2001, he was appointed as an Asst. Minister of Federal Affairs and Local Development of Nepal in the cabinet of Sher Bahadur Deuba. He took part in the People's Movement (Janandolan 2) and was arrested several times, imprisoned for more than 4 months. Chaurasia was elected as member to the constituent Assembly from Parsa 3 of Parsa District.

He was elected central committee member of Nepali Congress Party in 14th general convention of the party and chief of Terai-Madhesh Coordination Department. In 15th general convention of the party he was elected as Joint General Secretary of the party in October 2026.
