= Sagar Bhusal =

Nepalese politician

The Honourable Sagar Bhusal
- सागर भुसाल

Member of Parliament, Pratinidhi Sabha
- Incumbent
- Assumed office 26 March 2026
- Preceded by: Padam Giri
- Constituency: Parbat 1

Personal details
- Citizenship: Nepalese
- Party: Rastriya Swatantra Party
- Profession: Politician

Sagar Bhusal (Nepali: सागर भुसाल) is a Nepalese politician serving as a member of parliament from the Rastriya Swatantra Party. He is the member of the 7th Pratinidhi Sabha elected from Parbat 1 constituency in 2026 Nepalese General Election securing 26,561 votes and defeating his closest contender Arjun Prasad Joshi of the Nepali Congress.

== Electoral performance ==
Election	Year	Constituency	Contested for	Political party	Result	Votes	% of votes	Ref.
Nepal general election	2026	Parbat 1	Pratinidhi Sabha member	Rastriya Swatantra Party	Won	26,561	42.43%	
