= Bhisawa =

Bhisawa भिसवा
- Village development committee
- Location in Nepal
- Coordinates: 27.04°N 84.69°E
- Country: Nepal
- Zone: Narayani Zone
- District: Parsa District

Population (2011)
  - Total: 5,735
- Time zone: UTC+5:45 (Nepal Time)

Bhisawa is a village development committee in Parsa District in the Narayani Zone of southern Nepal. At the time of the 2011 Nepal census, it had a population of 5,735 living in 829 individual households. There were 2,920 males and 2,815 females at the time of census.
