= Jaimanglapur =

Coordinates: 27°3′N 84°40′E

Jaimanglapur जैमङ्गलपुर
- Village development committee
- Interactive map of Jaimanglapur
- Country: Nepal
- Zone: Narayani Zone
- District: Parsa District

Population (2011)
  - Total: 5,398
- Time zone: UTC+5:45 (Nepal Time)

Jaimanglapur is a village development committee in Parsa District in the Narayani Zone of southern Nepal. At the time of the 2011 Nepal census it had a population of 5,398 people living in 810 individual households. There were 2,721 males and 2,677 females at the time of census.
