= Parsauni Bhatha =

Prasauni Bhatha प्रसौनी भाठा
- [Bindabasini Rural Municipality,Parsa (Nepal)]
- Nickname: Prasauni Gau
- Location in Nepal
- Coordinates: 27.03°N 84.78°E
- Country: Nepal
- Zone: Narayani Zone
- District: Parsa District

Population (1991)
  - Total: 3,917
- Time zone: UTC+5:45 (Nepal Time)

Prasauni Bhatha is a [Bindabasini Rural Municipality Ward No.5] in Parsa District in the Narayani Zone southern Nepal. At the time of the 1991 Nepal census it had a population of 3917 people living in 618 individual households.
