= Mainiyari =

Coordinates: 27.3000°N 84.8400°E

Manari मनरी
- Village development committee
- Interactive map of Manari
- Country: Nepal
- Zone: Narayani Zone
- District: Parsa District

Population (2011)
  - Total: 6,627
- Time zone: UTC+5:45 (Nepal Time)

Mainiyari is a village development committee in Parsa District in the Narayani Zone of southern Nepal. At the time of the 2011 Nepal census it had a population of 6,627 people living in 934 individual households. There were 3,405 males and 3,222 females at the time of census.
