= Jhauwa Guthi =

Jhauwa Guthi झौवा गुठी
- Village development committee
- Location in Nepal
- Coordinates: 27.02°N 84.80°E
- Country: Nepal
- Zone: Narayani Zone
- District: Parsa District

Government

Population (2011)
  - Total: 6,362
- Time zone: UTC+5:45 (Nepal Time)

Jhauwa Guthi (Nepali झौवा गुठ्ठी) is a village development committee in Parsa District in the Narayani Zone of southern Nepal. At the time of the 2011 Nepal census it had a population of 6,362 people living in 993 individual households. There were 3,287 males and 3,075 females at the time of census. It is a village Development Committee(VDC) having 9 wards. The name of wards are : Jhauwaguthi01, Jhauwaguthi02, Jhauwaguthi03, Jhauwaguthi04, Jhauwaguthi05, jhauwaguthi06 and Madhwal. .
