= Gadi, Nepal =

Gadi गडी
- Village development committee
- Location in Nepal
- Coordinates: 27.21°N 84.82°E
- Country: Nepal
- Zone: Narayani Zone
- District: Parsa District

Population (2011)
  - Total: 4,358
- Time zone: UTC+5:45 (Nepal Time)

Gardi is a village development committee in Parsa District in the Narayani Zone of southern Nepal. At the time of the 2011 Nepal census it had a population of 4358 people living in 782 individual households. There were 2,201 males and 2,157 females at the time of census.
