= Bhawanipur, Parsa =

Bhawanipur भवानीपुर
- Village development committee
- Location in Nepal
- Coordinates: 27.06°N 84.89°E
- Country: Nepal
- Zone: Narayani Zone
- District: Parsa District

Population (2011)
  - Total: 6,193
- Time zone: UTC+5:45 (Nepal Time)

Bhawanipur is a village development committee in Parsa District in the Narayani Zone of southern Nepal. At the time of the 2011 Nepal census it had a population of 6,193 people living in 847 individual households. There were 3,276 males and 2,917 females at the time of census.
