= Gamhariya, Parsa =

Gamhariya गम्हरिया
- Village development committee
- Location in Nepal
- Coordinates: 27.09°N 84.84°E
- Country: Nepal
- Zone: Narayani Zone
- District: Parsa District

Population (2011)
  - Total: 4,176
- Time zone: UTC+5:45 (Nepal Time)

Gamhariya is a village in Parsa District, Narayani Zone, Central Development Region, Nepal, under the former administrative division of Nepal. In 1960, the first Pradhan Panch (President) of this panchayat was Shree Jagmohan Sah Sonar. In the 11th National Census 2011, its population was 4176, of which 2221 were males and 1955 were females, and there were 602 households. It is currently located in Ward No. 6 of Bahudarmai Municipality. The current ward chairman is Shri Pramod Prasad. Also see Gamhariya, Nepal.
