= Bahauri Pidari =

Bahuari Pidari बहुअरी पिडरी
- Village Development Committee
- Nickname: Dokaila Bahuari
- Location in Nepal
- Coordinates: 27.10°N 84.84°E
- Country: Nepal
- Zone: Narayani Zone
- District: Parsa District

Population (2011)
  - Total: 5,919
- Time zone: UTC+5:45 (Nepal Time)

Bahuari Pidari is a village development committee in Parsa District in the Narayani Zone of southern Nepal. At the time of the 2011 Nepal census it had a population of 5,919 people living in 858 individual households. There were 3,142 males and 2,777 females at the time of census.
