= Sushil Kumar Kanu =

Nepalese politician

- सुशील कुमार कानु

Member of Parliament, Pratinidhi Sabha
- Incumbent
- Assumed office 26 March 2026
- Preceded by: Ajay Chaurasiya
- Constituency: Parsa 2

Personal details
- Citizenship: Nepalese
- Party: Rastriya Swatantra Party
- Other political affiliations: Janta Samajbadi Party (Till Jan 2026)
- Education: Tribhuvan University (BCom)
- Profession: Politician

Sushil Kumar Kanu (Nepali: सुशील कुमार कानु) is a Nepalese politician serving as a member of parliament from the Rastriya Swatantra Party. He is the member of the 7th Pratinidhi Sabha elected from Parsa 2 constituency in 2026 Nepalese General Election securing 30,740 votes and defeating his closest contender Ajay Chaurasiya of the Nepali Congress. He was a former ward chairman of Birgunj Metropolitan City from Janata Samajbadi Party before joining RSP. He holds Bcom from Tribhuvan University.

== Electoral performance ==
Election	Year	Constituency	Contested for	Political party	Result	Votes	% of votes	Ref.
Nepal general election	2026	Parsa 2	Pratinidhi Sabha member	Rastriya Swatantra Party	Won	30,740	50.14%	
