= Sapauli =

Sapauli सपौली
- Village development committee
- Country: Nepal
- Zone: Narayani Zone
- District: Parsa District

Population (2011)
  - Total: 3,095
- Time zone: UTC+5:45 (Nepal Time)

Sapauli is a village development committee in Parsa District in the Narayani Zone of southern Nepal. At the time of the 2011 Nepal census it had a population of 3,095 people living in 578 individual households. There were 1,537 males and 1,558 females at the time of census.
