= Basadilwa =

Basadilwa बासादिलवा
- Village development committee
- Location in Nepal
- Coordinates: 27.12°N 84.90°E
- Country: Nepal
- Zone: Narayani Zone
- District: Parsa District

Population (2011)
  - Total: 6,410
- Time zone: UTC+5:45 (Nepal Time)

Basadilwa is a village development committee in Parsa District in the Narayani Zone of southern Nepal. At the time of the 2011 Nepal census it had a population of 6,410 people living in 903 individual households. There were 3,291 males and 3,119 females at the time of census.
