= Lal Parsa =

Coordinates: 27°6′N 84°55′E

Lal Parsa-30 Birgunj Metropolitan लाल पर्सा Jagpur
- Birgunj Metropolitan-30
- Nickname: Radhapur
- Interactive map of Lal Parsa-30 Birgunj Metropolitan
- Country: Nepal
- Zone: Narayani Zone
- District: Parsa District

Government
  - Type: Nepal Government (federal parliamentary republic)

Population (2011)
  - Total: 4,478
- Time zone: UTC+5:45 (Nepal Time)

Lal Parsa is a village development committee in Parsa District in the Narayani Zone of southern Nepal. At the time of the 2011 Nepal census it had a population of 4,478 people living in 616 individual households. There were 2,324 males and 2,154 females at the time of census.
