= Mudali =

Mudali मुडली
- Kalikamai Rural municipality ward no: 01
- Nickname: Mudali
- Location in Nepal
- Coordinates: 27.07°N 84.72°E
- Country: Nepal
- Zone: Narayani Zone
- District: Parsa District state = Pardesh no: 02

Population (2011)
  - Total: 5,850
- Time zone: UTC+5:45 (Nepal Time)

Mudali is a village development committee in Parsa District in the Narayani Zone of southern Nepal. At the time of the 2011 Nepal census it had a population of 5,850 people living in 823 individual households. There were 3,064 males and 2,786 females at the time of census.
