= Tek Bahadur Shakya =

Nepalese politician

The Honourable Tek Bahadur Shakya
- टेकबहादुर शाक्य

Member of Parliament, Pratinidhi Sabha
- Incumbent
- Assumed office 26 March 2026
- Preceded by: Ramesh Rijal
- Constituency: Parsa 4

Personal details
- Citizenship: Nepalese
- Party: Rastriya Swatantra Party
- Other political affiliations: Maoist Centre
- Education: Political Science Proficiency Certificate Level (PCL)
- Profession: Politician

Tek Bahadur Shakya (Nepali: टेकबहादुर शाक्य) is a Nepalese politician serving as a member of parliament from the Rastriya Swatantra Party. He is the member of the 7th Pratinidhi Sabha elected from Parsa 4 constituency in 2026 Nepalese General Election securing 28,006 votes and defeating his closest contender Ramesh Rijal of the Nepali Congress. Shakya was a former central member of then defunct party CPN (Maoist) before joining RSP. He holds Proficiency Certificate Level (PCL) in Political Science.

== Electoral performance ==
Election	Year	Constituency	Contested for	Political party	Result	Votes	% of votes	Ref.
Nepal general election	2026	Parsa 4	Pratinidhi Sabha member	Rastriya Swatantra Party	Won	28,006	45.28%	
