= Biranchibarba =

Biranchi Barwa बिरन्ची बर्वा
- Village development committee
- Nicknames: kalika mai gaupalika ward 5, birachibarwa
- Location in Nepal
- Coordinates: 27.07°N 84.74°E
- Country: Nepal
- Zone: Narayani Zone
- District: Parsa District

Population (2011)
  - Total: 3,625
- Time zone: UTC+5:45 (Nepal Time)
- Area code: +977

Biranchi Barwa is a village development committee (VDC) in Parsa District in the Narayani Zone of southern Nepal. At the time of the 2011 Nepal census it had a population of 3,625 people living in 558 individual households. There were 1,846 males and 1,779 females at the time of census.

From VDC Biranchi Barwa, Kathmandu is approx 300 km North. Nearest City from VDC Biranchi Barwa is Birgunj. Birgunj is just 3 km away from India's Border Raxaul. Village follows the panchayati system. Police station is established in the village. Distance between birgunj to biranchibarba is 21 km.

== Geography ==
Location Nepal, South Asia, Asia

Latitide 27° 3' 32.7" (27.0591°) North

Longitude 84° 44' 18.3" (84.7384°) East

Average elevation 77 meters (253 feet)

Coordinates: 27.07°N 84.74°E

== Transport ==
Public transport is available. For reaching Biranchi Barwa either you have to walk or hire a bullock cart. Earlier reaching Biranchi Barwa was very tough as there was no road. Late Shri Chandrika Prasad Tiwari had made a road for visiting his farm house and nearest places like Pokharia and Satwaria. Later on he declared his personal path as Public path and same path is used by villagers of Biranchi Barwa for reaching Pokharia or Birgunj.

== Education ==
Divya kanya Madhaymik vidhayalaya. This is a girls' school up to SLC (STD 10) (this school was donated by, and is funded by, foreigners)

Co-ed school till 5. (Land and building of school was donated by Late Shri Shashidhar Tiwari)

Hospital: (government Hospital)

Village has hospital running near road of kalika Mai temple. New Hospital is functional from the year 2013. Nearest Vet Hospital is in Pokhariya and Birgunj.

== Economy ==
Every Tuesday and Friday Villagers organize a vegetables, meat and fish market inside the village. Nearby villagers come and purchase/sell the vegetables, fish and meat.

The economy of the village is mainly based on agriculture and Animal Husbandry.

== Religion ==
Biranchi Barwa has few temples and two of them are very famous. These two temples are “Maa Durga Temple” and “Kalika Mai Temple” . Maa Durga Temple is situated in the heart of the village. Every year during “Durga Puja” (Dashain) , a Mela (Fair) is organized.

Kalika Mai Temple is believed to be oldest temple of Biranchi Barwa. Kalika Mai temple is situated at outskirt of Biranchi Barwa. It’s situated near Biranchi Barwa’s Football ground and river. Every year during "kalika mai in chaitra ram nami,

== Sport ==
Children’s of VDC Biranchi Barwa actively participate in sports like Cricket, Khusti and football. Villagers had won several matches, awards and accolades in cricket, football and Khusti.
