= Jitpur, Parsa =

Coordinates: 27.3000°N 84.8400°E

Jitpur जीतपुर Jeetpur
- Municipality
- Interactive map of Jitpur
- Country: Nepal
- Zone: Narayani Zone
- District: Parsa District

Population (2011)
  - Total: 5,160
- Time zone: UTC+5:45 (Nepal Time)

Jitpur is a Village Development Committee in Parsa District in the Narayani Zone of southern Nepal. At the time of the 2011 Nepal census it had a population of 5,160 people living in 952 individual households. There were 2,529 males and 2,631 females at the time of census.
