= Raj Kumar Gupta (Nepalese politician) =

Nepali politician

- राज कुमार गुप्ता

Minister of Federal Affairs and General Administration of Nepal
- In office 15 July 2024 – 15 July 2025
- President: Ram Chandra Poudel
- Prime Minister: KP Sharma Oli
- Preceded by: Bhanu Bhakta Joshi
- Succeeded by: Bhagwati Neupane

Member of Parliament, Pratinidhi Sabha
- In office 26 December 2022 – 12 September 2025
- Preceded by: Hari Narayan Rauniyar
- Constituency: Parsa 3

Personal details
- Born: 2 April 1971 (age 55) Parsa District
- Party: CPN (UML)

Raj Kumar Gupta is a Nepalese politician, belonging to the CPN (UML) who served as the Minister of Federal Affairs and General Administration of Nepal from 15 July 2024 until his resignation on 15 July 2025 amid a bribery scandal. Gupta is also a member of the 2nd Federal Parliament of Nepal. In the 2022 Nepalese general election, he was elected from the Parsa 3 (constituency).

== Controversy and Resignation ==
In July 2025, Minister Rajkumar Gupta resigned amid a bribery scandal that drew widespread criticism and public scrutiny. The controversy intensified after an audio recording allegedly exposing corruption under his ministry was leaked online.
