= Janikatala =

Coordinates: 27°8′N 84°41′E

Janikatala जनिकतला
- Village development committee
- Interactive map of Janikatala
- Country: Nepal
- Zone: Narayani Zone
- District: Parsa District

Population (2011)
  - Total: 4,402
- Time zone: UTC+5:45 (Nepal Time)

Janikatala is a village development committee in Parsa District in the Narayani Zone of southern Nepal. At the time of the 2011 Nepal census it had a population of 4,402 people living in 616 individual households. There were 2,200 males and 2,202 females at the time of census.
