= Belwa Parsauni =

Belwa Parsauni बेलवा
- Village development committee
- Location in Nepal
- Coordinates: 27.16°N 84.94°E
- Country: Nepal
- Zone: Narayani Zone
- District: Parsa District

Government
  - Type: Ward Officer = Mr. Jeetendar Yadav =

Population (2011)
  - Total: 9,301
- Time zone: UTC+5:45 (Nepal Time)

Belwa Parsauni is a village development committee in Parsa District in the Narayani Zone of southern Nepal. At the time of the 2011 Nepal census it had a population of 9,310 people living in 1,370 individual households. There were 4,790 males and 4,511 females at the time of census.
