= Ramgadhawa =

Ramgadhawa रामगढवा
- [Place in Birgunj]
- Location in Nepal
- Coordinates: 27.03°N 84.87°E
- Country: Nepal
- [Province]: [Province No. 2]
- District: Parsa District

Population (2011)
  - Total: 6,668
- Time zone: UTC+5:45 (Nepal Time)

Ramgadhawa is a settlement area in Birgunj Metropolitan City. It comes under the subdivision (Ward No.) 24 of the metropolitan city which is in Parsa District in the Province No. 2 of southern Nepal. At the time of the 2011 Nepal census it had a population of 6,668 people living in 996 individual households. Another area in Ward No. 24 of Birgunj is Bahuari which comes under Ramgadhawa.
