= Bagbana =

Bagbana बागबन
- Village development committee
- Location in Nepal
- Coordinates: 27.20°N 84.90°E
- Country: Nepal
- Zone: Narayani Zone
- District: Parsa District

Population (2011)
  - Total: 6,964
- Time zone: UTC+5:45 (Nepal Time)

Bagbana is a village development committee in Parsa District in the Narayani Zone of southern Nepal. At the time of the 2011 Nepal census it had a population of 6,964 people living in 1266 individual households.
