= Sugauli Paterwa =

Sugauli Paterwa सुगौली पटेर्वा
- Village development committee
- Location in Nepal
- Coordinates: 27.18°N 84.78°E
- Country: Nepal
- Zone: Narayani Zone
- District: Parsa District

Population (2011)
  - Total: 5,765
- Time zone: UTC+5:45 (Nepal Time)

Sugauli Paterwa is a village development committee in Parsa District in the Narayani Zone of southern Nepal. At the time of the 2011 Nepal census it had a population of 5,765 people living in 1,046 individual households. There were 2,852 males and 2,913 females at the time of census.
