= Sugauli Birta =

Sugauli Birta-Birgunj-26 सुगौली बिर्ता-26
- Village development committee
- Location in Nepal
- Coordinates: 27.05°N 84.85°E
- Country: Nepal
- Zone: Narayani Zone
- District: Parsa District

Population (2011)
  - Total: 6,176
- Time zone: UTC+5:45 (Nepal Time)

Sugauli Birta is a village development committee in Parsa District in the Narayani Zone of southern Nepal. At the time of the 2011 Nepal census it had a population of 6,176 people living in 898 individual households. There were 3,036 males and 3,140 females at the time of census.
