= Surjaha =

Surjaha सुर्जाहा
- Village development committee
- Location in Nepal
- Coordinates: 27.04°N 84.76°E
- Country: Nepal
- Zone: Narayani Zone
- District: Parsa District

Population (2011)
  - Total: 4,156
- Time zone: UTC+5:45 (Nepal Time)

Surjaha is a village development committee in Parsa District in the Narayani Zone of southern Nepal. At the time of the 2011 Nepal census it had a population of 4,156 people living in 632 individual households. There were 2,231 males and 1,925 females at the time of census.
