= Lahawarthakari =

Lahawarthakari लाहावरठकारी
- Village development committee
- Location in Nepal
- Coordinates: 27.03°N 84.73°E
- Country: Nepal
- Zone: Narayani Zone
- District: Parsa District

Population (2011)
  - Total: 4,038
- Time zone: UTC+5:45 (Nepal Time)

Lahawarthakari is a village development committee in Parsa District in the Narayani Zone of southern Nepal. At the time of the 2011 Nepal census it had a population of 4,038 people living in 523 individual households. There were 2,129 males and 1,909 females at the time of census.
