= Ramesh Prasad Kurmi =

Nepalese politician

Honourable Ramesh Prasad Kurmi
- रमेश प्रसाद कुर्मी

Province Assembly Member of Madhesh Province
- Incumbent
- Assumed office 2017
- Preceded by: N/A
- Constituency: Parsa 2 (constituency)

Personal details
- Party: Loktantrik Samajwadi Party, Nepal
- Occupation: Politician

Ramesh Prasad Kurmi (Nepali: रमेश प्रसाद कुर्मी) is a Nepalese politician and a member of Provincial Assembly of Madhesh Province belonging to the Loktantrik Samajwadi Party, Nepal. Kurmi, a resident of Birgunj, was elected via 2017 Nepalese provincial elections from Parsa 2(B). Earlier, he was with People's Socialist Party, Nepal, left it and joined Loktantrik Samajwadi Party, Nepal.

== Personal life ==
Kurmi was born to father Mukti Prasad Kurmi and mother Fulmati Devi.

== Electoral history ==
=== 2017 Nepalese provincial elections ===
Party	Candidate	Votes
Rastriya Janata Party Nepal	Ramesh Prasad Kurmi	9,706
Nepali Congress	Ram Rup Prasad	7,662
CPN (Maoist Centre)	Chhotolal Prasad Kurmi	2,663
Others		3,631
Invalid votes		1,106
Result	RJPN gain	
Source: Election Commission
