= Srisiya =

Coordinates: 27°4′N 84°46′E

Srisiya श्रीसिया
- Village development committee
- Interactive map of Srisiya
- Country: Nepal
- Zone: Narayani Zone
- District: Parsa District

Population (2011)
  - Total: 3,356
- Time zone: UTC+5:45 (Nepal Time)

Srisiya is a village development committee in Parsa District in the Narayani Zone of southern Nepal. At the time of the 2011 Nepal census it had a population of 3,356 people living in 527 individual households. There were 1,720 males and 1,636 females at the time of census.
