= Mahadevpatti =

Mahadevpatti महादेवपट्टी
- Village development committee
- Location in Nepal
- Coordinates: 27.20°N 84.70°E
- Country: Nepal
- Zone: Narayani Zone
- District: Parsa District

Population (2011)
  - Total: 7,174
- Time zone: UTC+5:45 (Nepal Time)

Mahadevpatti is a village development committee in Parsa District in the Narayani Zone of southern Nepal. At the time of the 2011 Nepal census it had a population of 7,174 people living in 1207 individual households. There were 3,700 males and 3,474 females at the time of census.
