= Govindapur, Parsa =

Govindapur गोविन्दपुर
- Village development committee
- Location in Nepal
- Coordinates: 27.05°N 84.77°E
- Country: Nepal
- Zone: Narayani Zone
- District: Parsa District

Population (2011)
  - Total: 2,897
- Time zone: UTC+5:45 (Nepal Time)

Govindapur is a village development committee in Parsa District in the Narayani Zone of southern Nepal. At the time of the 2011 Nepal census it had a population of 2,897 people living in 443 individual households. There were 1,465 males and 1,432 females at the time of census.
