= Mosihani =

Coordinates: 27.3000°N 84.8400°E

Masihani मसिहानि
- Village development committee
- Interactive map of Masihani
- Country: Nepal
- Zone: Narayani Zone
- District: Parsa District

Population (2011)
  - Total: 6,081
- Time zone: UTC+5:45 (Nepal Time)

Mosihani is a village development committee in Parsa District in the Narayani Zone of southern Nepal. At the time of the 2011 Nepal census it had a population of 6,081 people living in 968 individual households. There were 3,177 males and 2,904 females at the time of census.
