= Patbari Tola-Warwa =

Parvati Tola-Warwa पार्वती तोला-वार्वा
- Village development committee
- Country: Nepal
- Zone: Narayani Zone
- District: Parsa District

Population (1991)
  - Total: 4,060
- Time zone: UTC+5:45 (Nepal Time)

Parvati Tola-Warwa is a village development committee in Parsa District in the Narayani Zone of southern Nepal. At the time of the 1991 Nepal census it had a population of 4060 people living in 659 individual households.
