= Ghoddauda Pipra =

Coordinates: 27°7′N 84°41′E

Ghoddauda Pipra गम्हरिया पिप्रा
- Village development committee
- Interactive map of Ghoddauda Pipra
- Country: Nepal
- Zone: Narayani Zone
- District: Parsa District

Population (2011)
  - Total: 3,227
- Time zone: UTC+5:45 (Nepal Time)

Ghoddauda Pipra is a village development committee in Parsa District in the Narayani Zone of southern Nepal. At the time of the 2011 Nepal census it had a population of 3,227 people living in 488 individual households. There were 1,680 males and 1,547 females at the time of census.
