= Bijbaniya =

Bijbaniya बिजबानिया
- Village development committee
- Location in Nepal
- Coordinates: 27.15°N 84.71°E
- Country: Nepal
- Zone: Narayani Zone
- District: Parsa District

Population (2011)
  - Total: 3,816
- Time zone: UTC+5:45 (Nepal Time)

Bijbaniya is a village development committee in Parsa District in the Narayani Zone of southern Nepal. At the time of the 2011 Nepal census, it had a population of 3,816 people living in 512 individual households. There were 1,987 males and 1,829 females at the time of the census.
