= Shankar Saraiya =

Coordinates: 27°11′N 84°45′E

Shankar Saraiya शंकर सारैया
- Village development committee
- Interactive map of Shankar Saraiya
- Country: Nepal
- Zone: Narayani Zone
- District: Parsa District

Population (2011)
  - Total: 4,070
- Time zone: UTC+5:45 (Nepal Time)

Shankar Saraiya is a village development committee in Parsa District in the Narayani Zone of southern Nepal. At the time of the 2011 Nepal census it had a population of 4,070 people living in 771 individual households. There were 2,011 males and 2,059 females at the time of census.
