= Nirchuta =

Coordinates: 27°10′N 84°46′E

Nichuta
- Village development committee
- Interactive map of Nichuta
- Country: Nepal
- Zone: Narayani Zone
- District: Parsa District

Population (1991)
  - Total: 4,017
- Time zone: UTC+5:45 (Nepal Time)

Nirchuta is a village development committee in Parsa District in the Narayani Zone of southern Nepal. At the time of the 1991 Nepal census it had a population of 4,017 people living in 668 individual households.
