= Bindabasini Rural Municipality =

Bindyabasini बिन्दबासिनी
- Rural Municipality
- Bindyabasini Rural Municipality
- Location in Nepal
- Coordinates: 27.03°N 84.80°E
- Country: Nepal
- Development Region: Central
- Zone: Narayani Zone
- District: Parsa District
- Province: Province No. 2
- Established: 2016 A.D. (2073 B.S.)

Government
  - Type: Chairman- Pramod Tiwari (Loktantrik samajwadi party) Vice chairman- Jyoti Chaurasiya ( UML)

Area
  - Total: 26.04 km^{2} (10.05 sq mi)

Population (2011)
  - Total: 24,468
  - Density: 939.6/km^{2} (2,434/sq mi)
  - Religions: Hindu Muslim Christian

Languages
  - Local: Nepali, Bhojpuri
- Time zone: UTC+5:45 (NST)
- Postal Code: 44300
- Area code: 051
- Website: http://www.bindabasinimun.gov.np/

Bindyabasini (Nepali: बिन्दबासिनी ) is a rural municipality in Parsa District in Province No. 2 of Nepal. It was formed in 2016 occupying current 5 sections (wards) from previous 5 former VDCs. It occupies an area of 26.04 km^{2} with a total population of 24,468. It now consists of 5 wards of 14 small villages

== Location ==
Bindyabasini is located in the southern part of Parsa District and is surrounded by Birgunj metropolitan city from the east Bahaduramai Municipality from the North Pokhariya Municipality and Pakahamainpur Rural Municipality from the south

== Transportation ==
Roadways: Bindyabasini is connected with Postal highway and other small road project is under construction

Airport: Simra Airport is the nearest airport with daily flights to Kathmandu and Pokhra

Railway: Raxual and Bhelahi railway station is the closest railway station.

== Economy ==
Agriculture: Most of the people are involved in agriculture. Rice and wheat are the most common corps grown in the area. Vegetable cultivation along with fishing and animal husbandry is also growing.

Industry: Hulas steels is the biggest industry in the area along with the few others. Area beer factory and others are under construction. Due to the construction of Postal Highway and easy access to the Birgunj dry port this area has huge potential for industrial sector.
