= Dhobini Rural Municipality =

Dhobini धोबीनी
- Rural Municipality
- Location in Nepal
- Coordinates: 27.08°N 84.69°E
- Country: Nepal
- Zone: Narayani Zone
- District: Parsa District

Government

Population (2011)
  - Total: 4,903
- Time zone: UTC+5:45 (Nepal Time)
- Website: https://dhobinimun.gov.np/

Dhobini is a Rural Municipality in Parsa District in the Narayani Zone of southern Nepal. At the time of the 2011 Nepal census it had a population of 4,903 people living in 709 individual households. There were 2,484 males and 2,419 females at the time of census.
