= Paterwa Sugauli Rural Municipality =

Paterwa Sugauli पटेर्वा सुगौली
- Rural Municipality
- Location in Nepal
- Coordinates: 27.17°N 84.74°E
- Country: Nepal
- Development Region: Central
- Zone: Narayani Zone
- District: Parsa District
- Province: Province No. 2
- Established: 2016 A.D. (2073 B.S.)

Area
  - Total: 64.29 km^{2} (24.82 sq mi)

Population (2011)
  - Total: 23,901
  - Density: 371.8/km^{2} (962.9/sq mi)
  - Religions: Hindu Muslim Christian

Languages
  - Local: Nepali, Bhojpuri
- Time zone: UTC+5:45 (NST)
- Postal Code: 44300
- Area code: 051
- Website: http://www.paterwasugaulimun.gov.np/

Paterwa Sugauli (Nepali: पटेर्वा सुगौली) is a rural municipality in Parsa District in Province No. 2 of Nepal. It was formed in 2024, occupying the current five sections (wards) of the previous five former village development committees. It occupies an area of 64.29 km^{2} (24.82 sq mi) with a total population of 23,901.
