= Jagarnathpur Sira =

Coordinates: 27°10′N 84°45′E

Jagarnathpur Sira जगरनाथपुर
- Village development committee
- Interactive map of Jagarnathpur Sira
- Country: Nepal
- Zone: Narayani Zone
- District: Parsa District

Population (2011)
  - Total: 6,741
- Time zone: UTC+5:45 (Nepal Time)

Jagarnathpur Sira is a village development committee in Parsa District in the Narayani Zone of southern Nepal. At the time of the 2011 Nepal census, it had a population of 6741 people living in 1067 individual households. There were 3,508 males and 3,233 females at the time of census.
