= Pokhariya, Nepal =

Municipality in Madhesh Pradesh, Nepal

Pokhariya पोखरिया
- Municipality
- Location in Nepal
- Coordinates: 27.08°N 84.70°E
- Country: Nepal
- Development Region: Central
- Zone: Narayani
- District: Parsa
- Province: Madhesh
- Established: 2016 A.D. (2073 B.S.)

Government
  - Mayor: Pradyuman Chauhan (CPN (UML))
  - Deputy Mayor: Rubyya Kumari Thakur (CPN(UML))

Area
  - Total: 32.47 km^{2} (12.54 sq mi)

Population (2011)
  - Total: 32,885
  - Density: 1,013/km^{2} (2,623/sq mi)
  - Religions: Hindu Muslim

Languages
  - Local: Nepali, Bhojpuri
- Time zone: UTC+5:45 (NST)
- Postal Code: 44300
- Area code: 051
- Website: www.pokhariyamun.gov.np

Pokhariya is a municipality in Parsa District in the Narayani Zone of southern Nepal. At the time of the 2011 Nepal census it had a population of 6,995 people living in 1,015 individual households.

The normal temperature is 29 to 35 degree Celsius in summer where as in winter it falls down 14 to 25 degree Celsius which indicates that the climatic condition of summer is extremely hot where as in winter its extremely cold. The month of June is considered as the days having hottest climatic condition where as January has coldest climatic condition.
