= Industrial area =

Industrial area may refer to:

- Industrial district
- Industrial park
- Industrial region

== See also ==
- Industrial Area (Doha)
