= Prahlad Giri Goswami =

Nepalese politician

Honourable Prahlad Giri Goswami
- प्रहलाद गिरी गोस्वामी

Province Assembly Member of Madhesh Province
- Incumbent
- Assumed office 2017
- Preceded by: N/A
- Constituency: Parsa 3 (constituency)

Personal details
- Born: June 2, 1950 (age 75)
- Party: CPN (Unified Socialist)
- Occupation: Politician

Prahlad Giri Goswami (Nepali: प्रहलाद गिरी गोस्वामी) is a Nepalese politician and a member of Provincial Assembly of Madhesh Province belonging to CPN (Unified Socialist). Goswami, a resident of Birgunj, was elected via 2017 Nepalese provincial elections from Parsa 3(B). Earlier, he was a member of Loktantrik Samajwadi Party, Nepal.

== Personal life ==
Goswami was born on 2 June 1950 to father Lagan Giri and mother Kailashi Devi.

== Electoral history ==
=== 2017 Nepalese provincial elections ===
Party	Candidate	Votes
Federal Socialist Forum, Nepal	Prahlad Giri Goswami	6,345
Nepali Congress	Janardan Singh Chhetri	6,250
CPN (Maoist Centre)	Chhota Lal Prasad Yadav	4,346
Independent	Bindhyachal Thakur Hajaam	3,732
Nepal Federal Socialist Party	Shankar Raut Ahir	3,321
Others		1,603
Invalid votes		1,442
Result	FSFN gain	
Source: Election Commission
