= Parsagadhi =

Parsagadhi पर्सागढी
- Municipality
- Location in Nepal
- Coordinates: 27.13°N 84.85°E
- Country: Nepal
- Development Region: Central
- Zone: Narayani
- District: Parsa
- Province: Madhesh
- Established: 2016 A.D. (2073 B.S.)

Government
  - Mayor: Gokarna Pathak
  - Deputy Mayor: Puja Chaudhary

Area
  - Total: 99.69 km^{2} (38.49 sq mi)

Population (2011)
  - Total: 38,067
  - Density: 381.9/km^{2} (989.0/sq mi)
  - Religions: Hindu Muslim Buddhist Christian

Languages
  - Local: Nepali, Bhojpuri, Urdu
- Time zone: UTC+5:45 (NST)
- Postal Code: 44300
- Area code: 051
- Website: www.parsagadhimun.gov.np

Parsagadhi (Nepali: पर्सागढी ) is a municipality in Parsa District in Province No. 2 of Nepal. It was formed in 2016 occupying current 9 sections (wards) from previous 5 (Baghbanna, BIRUWAGUTHI, Harpur, Panchrukhi, Bageswari Titrauna) former VDCs. It occupies an area of 99.69 km^{2} with a total population of 38,067.
