= Kalikamai Rural Municipality =

Kalikamai कालिकामाई
- Rural Municipality
- Location in Nepal
- Coordinates: 27.07°N 84.71°E
- Country: Nepal
- Development Region: Central
- Zone: Narayani Zone
- District: Parsa District
- Province: Province No. 2
- Established: 2016 A.D. (2073 B.S.)

Area
  - Total: 24.33 km^{2} (9.39 sq mi)

Population (2011)
  - Total: 21,131
  - Density: 868.5/km^{2} (2,249/sq mi)
  - Religions: Hindu Muslim Christian

Languages
  - Local: Nepali, Bhojpuri
- Time zone: UTC+5:45 (NST)
- Postal Code: 44300
- Area code: 051
- Website: http://www.kalikamaimun.gov.np/

Kalikamai (Nepali: कालिकामाई ) is a rural municipality in Parsa District in Province No. 2 of Nepal. It was formed in 2016 occupying current 5 sections (wards) from previous 5 former VDCs. It occupies an area of 24.33 km^{2} with a total population of 21,131.
