= Thori Rural Municipality =

Thori ठोरी
- Rural Municipality
- Location in Nepal
- Coordinates: 27.35°N 84.52°E
- Country: Nepal
- Development Region: Central
- Zone: Narayani
- District: Parsa
- Province: Madhesh
- Established: 2016 A.D. (2073 B.S.)

Area
  - Total: 128.67 km^{2} (49.68 sq mi)

Population (2011)
  - Total: 20,296
  - Density: 157.74/km^{2} (408.54/sq mi)
  - Religions: Hindu Buddhist Christian

Languages
  - Local: Nepali, Tamang
- Time zone: UTC+5:45 (NST)
- Postal Code: 44300
- Area code: 051
- Website: www.thorimun.gov.np

Thori (Nepali: ठोरी) is a rural municipality in Parsa District in Province No. 2 of Nepal. It was formed in 2016 occupying current 5 sections (wards) from previous 3 former VDCs. It occupies an area of 128.67 km^{2} with a total population of 20,296.

The 2026 film Elephants in the Fog was set and produced in Thori.
