= Pakaha Mainpur Rural Municipality =

Pakaha Mainpur पकाहा मैनपुर
- Rural Municipality
- Location in Nepal
- Coordinates: 27.02°N 84.73°E
- Country: Nepal
- Development Region: Central
- Zone: Narayani
- District: Parsa
- Province: Madhesh
- Established: 2016 A.D. (2073 B.S.)

Area
  - Total: 21.26 km^{2} (8.21 sq mi)

Population (2011)
  - Total: 20,717
  - Density: 974.5/km^{2} (2,524/sq mi)
  - Religions: Hindu Muslim Christian

Languages
  - Local: Nepali, Bhojpuri
- Time zone: UTC+5:45 (NST)
- Postal Code: 44300
- Area code: 051
- Website: www.pakahamainpurmun.gov.np

Pakaha Mainpur (Nepali: पकाहा मैनपुर) is a rural municipality in Parsa District in Province No. 2 of Nepal. It was formed in 2016 occupying current 5 sections (wards) from previous 5 former VDCs. It occupies an area of 21.26 km^{2} with a total population of 20,717.
