= Chhipahrmai Rural Municipality =

Rural municipality in Madhesh Province, Nepal

Chhipahrmai (Nepali: छिपहरमाई) is a rural municipality in Parsa District in Madhesh Province of Nepal. It was formed in 2016 occupying current 5 sections (wards) from previous 5 former VDCs. It occupies an area of 24.90 km^{2} with a total population of 26,671. Manoj Gupta is the president of Chhipaharmai Rural Municipality.
