= Arjun Prasad Joshi =

Nepali politician

Personal details
- Party: Nepali Congress

Arjun Prasad Joshi is a Nepalese politician. He was elected to the Pratinidhi Sabha in the 1999 election on behalf of the Nepali Congress which was claimed that he grabbed ticket from another candidate and won rigging. In the April 2008 Constituent Assembly election he was elected from the Parvat-1 constituency, winning 13258 votes. He was defeated by Sagar Bhusal of Rastriya Swatantra Party in parliamentary 2026 general election.
