= Sakhuwa Prasauni Rural Municipality =

Sakhuwa Prasauni सखुवा प्रसौनी
- Rural Municipality
- Location in Nepal
- Coordinates: 27.35°N 84.52°E
- Country: Nepal
- Development Region: Central
- Zone: Narayani
- District: Parsa
- Province: Madhesh
- Established: 2016 A.D. (2073 B.S.)

Area
  - Total: 74.27 km^{2} (28.68 sq mi)

Population (2011)
  - Total: 32,448
  - Density: 436.9/km^{2} (1,132/sq mi)
  - Religions: Hindu Muslim Christian

Languages
  - Local: Nepali, Bhojpuri
- Time zone: UTC+5:45 (NST)
- Postal Code: 44300
- Area code: 051
- Website: www.sakhuwaprasaunimun.gov.np

Sakhuwa Prasauni (Nepali: सखुवा प्रसौनी ) is a rural municipality in Parsa District in Province No. 2 of Nepal. It was formed in 2016 occupying current 6 sections (wards) from previous 6 former VDCs. It occupies an area of 74.27 km^{2} with a total population of 32,448.
