= Jagarnathpur Rural Municipality =

Jagarnathpur जगरनाथपुर
- Rural Municipality
- Location in Nepal
- Coordinates: 27.14°N 84.71°E
- Country: Nepal
- Development Region: Central
- Zone: Narayani Zone
- District: Parsa District
- Province: Province No. 2
- Established: 2016 A.D. (2073 B.S.)

Government
  - Chairperson: Shreekant Prasad Yadav (NC)
  - Deputy chairperson: Babita Singh (NC)

Area
  - Total: 45.29 km^{2} (17.49 sq mi)

Population (2011)
  - Total: 31,591
  - Density: 697.5/km^{2} (1,807/sq mi)
  - Religions: Hindu Muslim Christian

Languages
  - Local: Nepali, Bhojpuri
- Time zone: UTC+5:45 (NST)
- Postal Code: 44300
- Area code: 051
- Website: http://www.jagarnathpurmun.gov.np/

Jagarnathpur (Nepali: जगरनाथपुर ) is a rural municipality in Parsa District in Province No. 2 of Nepal. It was formed in 2016 occupying current 6 sections (wards) from previous 6 former VDCs. It occupies an area of 45.29 km^{2} with a total population of 31,591.
