= Bahudarmai =

Bahudarmai बहुदरमाई
- Municipality
- Location in Nepal
- Coordinates: 27.05°N 84.81°E
- Country: Nepal
- Development Region: Central
- Zone: Narayani
- District: Parsa
- Province: Madhesh
- Established: 2016 A.D. (2073 B.S.)

Government
  - Mayor: Singhasan Sah Teli
  - Deputy Mayor: Sushma Kumari kushwaha

Area
  - Total: 31.55 km^{2} (12.18 sq mi)

Population (2011)
  - Total: 39,673
  - Density: 1,257/km^{2} (3,257/sq mi)
  - Religions: Hindu Muslim Christian

Languages
  - Local: Nepali, Bhojpuri
- Time zone: UTC+5:45 (NST)
- Postal Code: 44300
- Area code: 051
- Website: www.bahudarmaimun.gov.np

Bahudarmai (Nepali: बहुदरमाई ) is a municipality in Parsa District in Province No. 2 of Nepal. It was formed in 2016 occupying current 9 sections (wards) from previous 9 former VDCs. It occupies an area of 31.55 km^{2} with a total population of 39,763.

== Notable Place ==
- Bahudaramai Temple
- Dokaila Chowk
- Tilawe River Barrage
