= Parsa District =

District in Madhesh Province, Nepal

Coordinates: 27°0′N 84°52′E

Parsa District पर्सा जिल्ला
- District
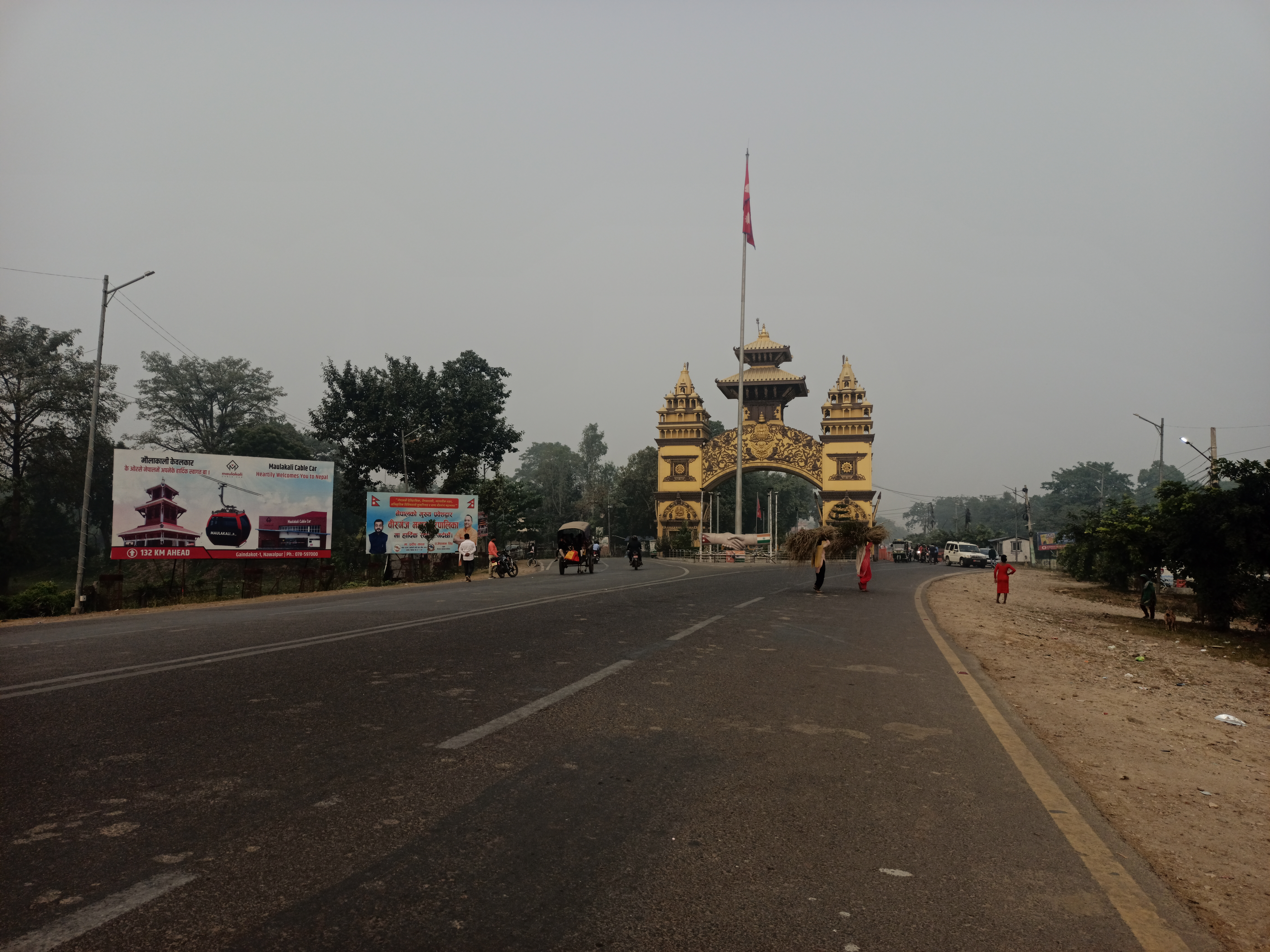
- The Shankaracharya Gate in Birganj on the Indo-Nepal border
- Etymology: derived from Parsagadhi fort
- Location of Parsa District (dark yellow) in Madhesh Province
- Country: Nepal
- Region: Bhojpur
- Province: Madhesh
- Established: During Rana regime
- Admin HQ.: Birgunj

Government
  - Type: Coordination committee
  - Body: DCC, Parsa
  - Head: Ajay sah sonar
  - Deputy-Head: puran patel
  - Parliamentary constituencies: 4 (List)
  - Provincial constituencies: 8

Area
  - Total: 1,353 km^{2} (522 sq mi)

Population (2021)
  - Total: 649,397
  - Density: 480.0/km^{2} (1,243/sq mi)
  - Households: 95,516

Demographics
  - Ethnic groups: Muslim, Kurmi, Tharu, Yadav
  - Female ♀: 48%
  - Male ♂/100 female: 108.21

Human Development Index
  - Income per capita (US dollars): $1657
  - Poverty rate: 36.37
  - Literacy: 69.1%
  - Life Expectancy: 70.25
- Time zone: UTC+05:45 (NPT)
- Postal Codes: 44301... 44315
- Telephone Code: 051
- Main Language: Bhojpuri
- Website: dccparsa.gov.np

Parsa District (Nepali: पर्सा जिल्ला), a part of Madhesh Province in Terai plain, is one of the seventy-seven districts of Nepal. The district, with Birgunj as its district headquarters, covers an area of 1,353 km^{2} (522 sq mi) and has a population (2001) of 497,219. According to the locals, Parsa is named after the Parashnath temple situated in Mahuwan.

== Etymology ==
According to locals, the name of the district is derived from the Parsagadhi fort, where the Nepali Gorkhali Soldiers defeated British Soldiers.

== Geography and Climate ==
| Climate Zone | Elevation Range | % of Area |
|---|---|---|
| Lower Tropical | below 300 meters (1,000 ft) | 74.7% |
| Upper Tropical | 300 to 1,000 meters 1,000 to 3,300 ft. | 25.3n% |

== Demographics ==
Historical population
| Census year | 1981 | 1991 | 2001 | 2011 | 2021 |
| Pop. | 284,338 | 372,524 | 497,219 | 601,017 | 649,397 |
| ±% p.a. | — | +2.74% | +2.93% | +1.91% | +0.78% |
Source: Citypopulation

At the time of the 2021 Nepal census, Parsa District had a population of 654,471. 9.45% of the population is under 5 years of age. It has a literacy rate of 69.12% and a sex ratio of 935 females per 1000 males. 395,104 (60.37%) lived in municipalities.

Ethnic groups/castes in Parsa district (2021)
1. Muslim (17.1%)
2. Kurmi (8.88%)
3. Tharu (6.88%)
4. Yadav (6.82%)
5. Kanu (6.24%)
6. Chamar (5.11%)
7. Teli (4.41%)
8. Paswan (2.83%)
9. Kushwaha (2.47%)
10. Other Madheshi non-Dalit (24.4%)
11. Other Madheshi Dalit (4.08%)
12. Khas non-Dalit (3.22%)
13. Hill Janjati (2.87%)
14. Other Terai Janjati (1.35%)
15. Others (3.26%)

Ethnicity/caste: Madheshi are the largest group, making up over 65% of the population. Muslims are the largest single community, making up over 17% of the population. Tharus are nearly 7% of the population. There are small minorities of Khas and Hill Janjati.

Languages of Parsa district (2021)
1. Bhojpuri (84.7%)
2. Nepali (4.80%)
3. Tharu (3.75%)
4. Urdu (2.08%)
5. Tamang (1.16%)
6. Maithili (1.13%)
7. Others (2.37%)

At the time of the 2021 census, 84.71% of the population spoke Bhojpuri, 4.80% Nepali, 3.75% Tharu, 2.08% Urdu, 1.16% Tamang and 1.13% Maithili as their first language.

Religion in Parsa district (2021)
| Religion | Percent |
| Hinduism | 80.84% |
| Islam | 17.80% |
| Buddhism | 1.21% |
| Other or not stated | 0.15% |

Religion: 81% were Hindu, 18% Muslim, 1% Buddhist.

Literacy: 55.7% could read and write, 2.9% could only read and 41.3% could neither read nor write.

== Notable people ==
- Ajay Chaurasiya - Nepali Congress leader, former minister and former Member of House of Representatives/Constituent Assembly
- Bina Jaiswal - Bina Jaiswal is a Nepalese politician, belonging to the Rastriya Prajatantra Party.
- Mohammad Lalbabu Raut Gaddhi - First Chief Minister of Madhesh Province
- Pradeep Yadav - leader of PSP-N and member of House of Representatives

== Administration ==
VDC/s and Municipalities (blue) in Parsa District The district consists of one metropolitan city, three urban municipalities and ten rural municipalities. These are as follows:

- Birgunj Metropolitan City
- Bahudarmai Municipality
- Parsagadhi Municipality
- Pokhariya Municipality
- Bindabasini Rural Municipality
- Dhobini Rural Municipality
- Chhipaharmai Rural Municipality
- Jagarnathpur Rural Municipality
- Jirabhawani Rural Municipality
- Kalikamai Rural Municipality
- Pakaha Mainpur Rural Municipality
- Paterwa Sugauli Rural Municipality
- Sakhuwa Prasauni Rural Municipality
- Thori Rural Municipality

=== Former Village Development Committees (VDCs) and municipalities ===
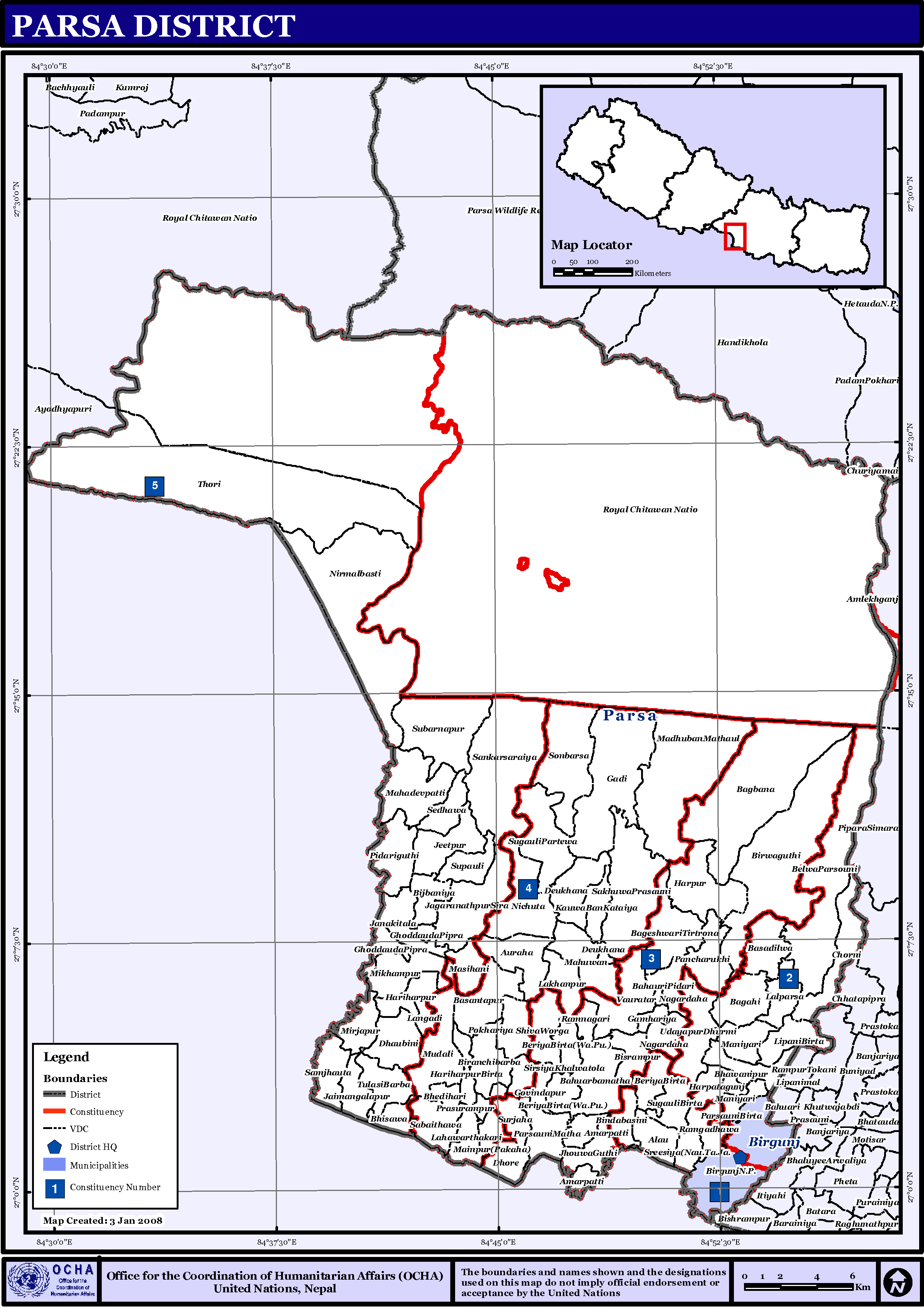
Map of the VDCs in Parsa District

- Alau, Nepal
- Amarpatti
- Auraha
- Bagahi
- Bagbana
- Bageshwari
- Bahauri Pidari
- Bahuarba Bhatha
- Basadilwa
- Basantpur
- Belwa Parsauni
- Beriya Birta
- Bhauratar
- Bhawanipur
- Bhedihari
- Bhisawa
- Bijbaniya
- Bindyabasini
- Biranchi Barwa
- Birganj Sub-Metropolitan City
- Biruwa Guthi
- Bisrampur
- Chorani
- Deukhana
- Dhobini
- Gadi
- Gamhariya
- Ghoddauda Pipra
- Ghore
- Govindapur
- Hariharpur
- Hariharpur Birta
- Harapatganj
- Harpur
- Jagarnathpur Sira
- Jaimanglapur
- Janikatala
- Jhauwa Guthi
- Jitpur
- Kauwa Ban Kataiya
- Lahawarthakari
- Lakhanpur
- Lal Parsa
- Langadi
- Lipani Birta
- Madhuban Mathaul
- Mahadevpatti
- Mahuwan
- Mainiyari
- Mainpur
- Mikhampur
- Mirjapur
- Mosihani
- Mudali
- Nagardaha
- Nirchuta
- Nirmal Basti
- Pancharukhi
- Parsauni Matha
- Patbari Tola-Warwa
- Paterwa Sugauli
- Pidariguthi
- Pokhariya Municipality
- Phulwariya
- Prasauni Birta
- Prasurampur
- Ramgadhawa
- Ramnagari
- Sabaithawa
- Sakhuwa Prasauni
- Samjhauta
- Sankar Saraiya
- Sapauli
- Sedhawa
- Shiva Worga
- Sirsiya Khalwatola
- Sonbarsa
- Srisiya
- Subarnapur
- Sugauli Birta
- Sugauli Partewa
- Surjaha
- Thori
- Tulsi Barba
- Udaypur Ghurmi
