= Piparpati Parchrauwa =

Piparpati pacharauta पिपरपती पचरौता
- Village Development Committee
- Location in Nepal
- Coordinates: 26.86°N 85.08°E
- Country: Nepal
- Province: Madhesh
- District: Bara District

Area
  - Total: 3.43 km^{2} (1.32 sq mi)

Population (2021)
  - Total: 5,526
  - Density: 1,610/km^{2} (4,170/sq mi)
- Time zone: UTC+5:45 (Nepal Time)
- Area code: 053

Piparpati pachrauta

Piparpati Pachrauta is a town and Village in Bara District in the Madesh Province of south-eastern Nepal. At the time of the 2021 Nepal census it had a population of 5,526. Farming is the main occupation of the people of here. Some of the people are also involved in service and home trade. It is bordered by Jamuni river which separates the village from Bihar of India in the south. It has hot climate with average rainfall of 2 cm. People spend very simple livelihood .It has good progress in the development.

Piparpati Pachrauta is a village (ward) belongs to Pachrauta Municipality in Bara District of Madhesh Province. In south there is Border of India with East Champaran of Bihar State while in North Bishunpur (Ward No. 6) of same Pachrauta Municipality and in east Bairiya with some Border of India with East Champaran of Bihar State while in West Beldari Inarwa (Ward No. 5) and Pakadiya (Ward No.6)of same Pachrauta Municipality. Piparpati Pachrauta is good enough in access of natural resources that includes diverse flora, fauna, fresh water river, community forests, community garden and plain fertile for agriculture. Also, a great access of manmade resources like Dam (Nahar) water supply for irrigation and almost 24 hrs X 7 days electricity in all over the agricultural lands for irrigation of these land.

== Education ==
The overall literacy rate (for population age 5 years and above) increased from 60.5% in 2005 to 90.9% in 2017. The male literacy rate was 98.1% compared to the female literacy rate of 75.3%. There is one Government School near market, where studying up to Bachelor degree in Education (B.Ed), and Intermediate in Education (I.Ed) and also very soon there will be start Science and Mathematics.

There is one Government School (Shree Nepal Rastiya Secondary School Piparpati) near Piparpati market, where studying up to Bachelor degree in Education (B.Ed), and Intermediate in Education (I.Ed) and also very soon there will be start Science and Mathematics. From last 10(Ten) Years, since 2016 there is also a Technical Education(Computer Engineering) class is in the process. This Technical Education class Verify and monitored by CTEVT Nepal. The course start form class 9th to 12th (Full 4 year Computer Engineering Course).

== Government (Local Government) ==
Ward No. 1

Municipality: - Pachrauta

Mayor: - Jalandhar Singh Jaiswal

Deputy Mayor: - Nasima Khatun

Ward Office: - Piparpati Pachrauta

Includes VDC:- Piparpati Pachrauta (Ward 1 - 9)

Total Area: - 3.43 (Square K.M.)

Total Population: - 5033 (2011)

Ward Contact Person Name, Post, and Contact

Ward Contact Person Name, Post, and Contact
SN	Name	Post	Contact
1	Shree. Binay Kumar Singh	Ward Chairman	9845548790
2	Shri. Mahaboob Alam Mansuri	Ward secretary	9819201300
3	Shree. Bhikhari Mahato Nuniya	Ward Member	9807101844
4	Md. Samsudin Miya Ansari	Ward Member	9817203673
5	Shrimati. Sindu Devi	Ward backwards Female Member	-
6	Shrimati. Chameli Devi	Ward Female Member	-
