= Pakadiya Chikani =

Pakadiya पकाडिया
- Under Pachrauta Municipality (Ward No 4, 5, & 6)
- Location in Nepal
- Coordinates: 26.87°N 85.07°E
- Country: Nepal
- Province: Madhesh Province
- District: Bara District

Population (2021)
  - Total: 5,231
- Time zone: UTC+5:45 (Nepal Time)
- Postal code: 44406

Pakadiya (Nepali: पकडिया) is a village of Pachrauta Municipality ward no.6. and in Bara District, in the Madhesh Province of south-eastern Nepal. At the time of the 2021 Nepal census, it had a population of 5231 (Male - 2709 and Female 2522) persons living in 754 individual households.

Pakadiya is a village (ward) belongs to Pachrauta Municipality in Bara District of Narayani Zone of Madhesh Province. In south there is Beldari (Ward No. 4) while in North Benauli (Ward No. 7) of same Pachrauta Municipality and in east Piparpati Bazar and Bisunpur (Ward No. 6) while in West Tiwar River with India Border. Pakadiya is good enough in access of natural resources that includes diverse flora, fauna, fresh water river, community forests, community garden and plain fertile for agriculture. Also a great access of man made resources like Dam (Nahar) water supply for irrigation and almost 24 hrs X 7 days electricity in all over the agricultural lands for irrigation of these land. There is a government school as well along with two private primary level boarding schools .The name of the government school is Shree Nepal Rastriya Aadharbhut School and of these private schools are Little Step English Boarding school and New Shinning English Boarding school. Majority of Hindus and they are prosperous in education, Technology, health and wealth.

== Ward No. 6 ==
Ward Office: - Pakadiya Chikani

Includes Vdc: - Pakiya Chikani (Ward 2 & 7)

Total Area: - 4.18 (Square K.M.)

Total Population: - 5013(2021)

Ward Contact Person Name, Post, and Contact

Ward Contact Person Name, Post, and Contact
SN	Name	Post	Contact
1	Shree Makbul Ansari	Ward Chairman	9855048796
2	Shree Rajaram Prasad Sah	Ward secretary	-
3	Daya Devi Yadav	Former Acting Ward Chairman, Member	9815285225
4	Shree Udanwaz Sahani Malah	Ward Member	9819242619
5	Shree pradip prasad chaurasia	Ward Female Member	Shree Rampati Devi mahara
