= 2023 Bara–2 by-election =

Nepali House of Representatives election

← 2022	23 April 2023

Constituency of Bara 2 in the House of Representatives
- Turnout: 64%
Candidate	Upendra Yadav	Shivachandra Prasad Kushwaha	Purushottam Poudel
Party	PSP-Nepal	Janamat	CPN (UML)
Popular vote	28,415	23,334	10,216
Percentage	41.67	34.22%	14.98
- Bara 2 in Madhesh Province
MP before election
Ram Sahaya Yadav
PSP-Nepal
Elected MP
Upendra Yadav
PSP-Nepal

The 2023 Bara–2 by-election was held in the Bara 2 constituency of Nepal on 23 April 2023. The by-election was held as the result of the vacation of the seat by the sitting member, Ram Sahay Prasad Yadav, who was elected vice president on 17 March 2023. It was held alongside by-elections in Chitwan 2 and Tanahun 1.

Upendra Yadav, chairman of the People's Socialist Party, Nepal, who had been defeated in Saptari 2 in the 2022 general election, was elected from the by-election, defeating Janamat Party's Shivachandra Prasad Kushwaha, who had contested the seat from the CPN (Maoist Centre) in 2022.

== Background ==
First elected as a proportional candidate from the Madhesi Jana Adhikar Forum, Nepal's party list in 2008, Yadav was not re-elected in 2013 despite being on the party list. He then contested and won from Bara 2 in 2017 from the MJFN's successor party, the Federal Socialist Forum, Nepal. Yadav briefly served as the minister for Forests and Environment from 2021 to 2022 in the fifth Deuba cabinet. He was re-elected from Bara 2 in 2022 by a very thin margin of just 354 votes.

Yadav was the candidate from the People's Socialist Party, Nepal and the 10-party ruling alliance for the 2023 vice-presidential election, and was elected vice president on 17 March 2023, defeating CPN (UML)'s Astalaxmi Shakya and Janamat Party's Mamata Jha. He resigned as member of Parliament before assuming office as vice president on 20 March 2023.

=== 2022 election result ===
Candidate	Party	Votes	%
Ram Sahaya Yadav	People's Socialist Party, Nepal	13,822	21.68
Shivachandra Prasad Kushwaha	CPN (Maoist Centre)	13,468	21.13
Ram Kishor Prasad Yadav	Independent	11,043	17.32
Rabindra Prasad Yadav	Independent	10,750	16.86
Arun Kumar Gyawali	Independent	7,698	12.08
Rajesh Sah	Janamat Party	2,725	4.28
Tej Bahadur Bhagat	Nagrik Unmukti Party	1,111	1.74
Others		3,125	4.90
Total		63,742	100.00
Majority		354	
People's Socialist Party, Nepal hold			
Source: ECN

== Result ==
Candidate	Party	Votes	%	+/–
Upendra Yadav	People's Socialist Party, Nepal	28,415	41.67	+19.99
Shivachandra Prasad Kushwaha	Janamat Party	23,334	34.22	+29.94
Purushottam Poudel	CPN (UML)	10,216	14.98	New
Ramesh Kharel	Rastriya Swatantra Party	2,829	4.15	New
Arun Kumar Gyawali	Aam Janata Party	2,738	4.02	New
Others		660	0.97	−73.06
Total		68,192	100.00	–
Majority		5,081		
People's Socialist Party, Nepal hold				
Source: ECN
