= Chandan Kumar Singh (Nepalese politician) =

Nepalese politician

Honourable Chandan Kumar Singh
- चन्दन कुमार सिंह

Member of Parliament, Pratinidhi Sabha
- Incumbent
- Assumed office 26 March 2026
- Preceded by: Upendra Yadav
- Constituency: Bara 2

Personal details
- Born: 10 April 1983 (age 43) Devtal, Bara, Nepal
- Citizenship: Nepalese
- Party: Rastriya Swatantra Party (2025 – present)
- Other political affiliations: Nepal Sadbhawana Party; Terai Madhesh Loktantrik Party; Rastriya Janata Party Nepal
- Children: 2
- Parents: Bishwanath Singh (father); Saraswati Devi Singh (mother)
- Profession: Politician

Chandan Kumar Singh (Nepali: चन्दन कुमार सिंह) is a Nepalese politician serving as a member of parliament from the Rastriya Swatantra Party. He was elected to the Pratinidhi Sabha, the lower house of the Federal Parliament of Nepal from Bara 2 Parliamentary constituency in the 2026 Nepalese General Election. He secured 35,590 votes and defeated his closest contender Ramkishor Prasad Yadav of the People's Socialist Party, Nepal.

== Early and personal life ==
Chandan Kumar Singh was born in Devtal, Bara, Nepal, on 10 April 1983. He was born to Bishwanath Singh and Saraswati Devi Singh. His father was a political leader and served as then Bara District Development Committee President in the Panchayati system.

He graduated in political science and sociology. He was married and had two children.

== Politics ==
He joined the Nepal Sadbhawana Party affiliated student union to start his political career. In 2009, he entered Terai Madhesh Loktantrik Party to focus on Madhesh based politics.

Singh contested the chairmanship of Devtal Rural Municipality as a representative of the Rastriya Janata Party Nepal during the 2017 local elections and secured first place with 2,330 votes. He ran again for the same position in 2022 local election but lost to Uday Prasad Yadav. He joined Rastriya Swatantra Party in 2026.

== Electoral performance ==
Election	Year	Constituency	Contested for	Political party	Result	Votes	% of votes	Ref.
Nepal local election	2017	Devtal Rural Municipality	Chairman	Rastriya Janata Party Nepal	Won	2,330	28.65%	
Nepal local election	2022	Devtal Rural Municipality	Chairman	Loktantrik Samajwadi Party, Nepal	Lost	3,575	33.32%	
Nepal general election	2026	Bara 2	Pratinidhi Sabha member	Rastriya Swatantra Party	Won	35,590	48.91%	
