= Bara 2 =

Parliamentary constituency in Nepal

- Parliamentary constituency for the House of Representatives 2079
- Bara 2 in Madhesh Province
- Province: Madhesh Province
- District: Bara District

Current constituency
- Created: 1991
- Rastriya Swatantra Party: JASPA Nepal
- Member Of Parliament, Lower House: Chandan Kumar Singh
- MPA 2A: Sharda Shankar Prasad Kalwar
- MPA 2B: Bacha Raut Ahir

Bara 2 is one of four parliamentary constituencies of Bara District in Nepal. This constituency came into existence on the Constituency Delimitation Commission (CDC) report submitted on 31 August 2017.

== Incorporated areas ==
Bara 2 incorporates Pacharauta Municipality, Suwarna Rural Municipality, Karaiyamai Rural Municipality, Mahagadhimai Municipality, Devtal Rural Municipality and ward 8 of Kolhabi Municipality.

== Assembly segments ==
It encompasses the following Province No. 2 Provincial Assembly segment

- Bara 2(A)
- Bara 2(B)

== Members of Parliament ==
=== Parliament/Constituent Assembly ===
Election	Member	Party
1991	Sohan Prasad Chaudhary	CPN (Unified Marxist–Leninist)
1994	Radhe Chandra Yadav	Nepali Congress
1999	Sohan Prasad Chaudhary	CPN (Unified Marxist–Leninist)
2008	Shiva Chandra Prasad Kushawaha	CPN (Maoist)
January 2009	Shiva Chandra Prasad Kushawaha	UCPN (Maoist)
2013	Radhe Chandra Yadav	Nepali Congress
2017	Ram Sahaya Yadav	Federal Socialist Forum, Nepal
May 2019	Ram Sahaya Yadav	Samajbadi Party, Nepal
April 2020	Ram Sahaya Yadav	People's Socialist Party, Nepal
2023	Upendra Yadav	People's Socialist Party, Nepal
2026	Chandan Kumar Singh	Rastriya Swatantra Party

=== Provincial Assembly ===
==== 2(A) ====
Election	Member	Party
2017	Sarada Shankar Prasad Kalwar	Federal Socialist Forum, Nepal
May 2019	Sarada Shankar Prasad Kalwar	Samajbadi Party, Nepal
April 2020	Sarada Shankar Prasad Kalwar	People's Socialist Party, Nepal

==== 2(B) ====
Election	Member	Party
2017	Bachha Raut Ahir	Federal Socialist Forum, Nepal
May 2019	Bachha Raut Ahir	Samajbadi Party, Nepal
April 2020	Bachha Raut Ahir	People's Socialist Party, Nepal

== Election results ==
=== Election in the 2020s ===
==== 2023 by-election ====
Candidate	Party	Votes	%
Upendra Yadav	People's Socialist Party, Nepal	28,415	41.67
Shivachandra Prasad Kushwaha	Janamat Party	23,334	34.22
Purushottam Paudel	CPN (UML)	10,216	14.98
Ramesh Kharel	Rastriya Swatantra Party	2,829	4.15
Arun Kumar Gyawali	Aam Janata Party	2,738	4.02
Others		660	0.97
Total		68,192	100.00
Majority		5,081	
People's Socialist Party, Nepal hold			
Source: Election Commission

==== 2022 general election ====
Candidate	Party	Votes	%
Ram Sahaya Yadav	People's Socialist Party, Nepal	13,822	21.68
Shivachandra Prasad Kushwaha	CPN (Maoist Centre)	13,468	21.13
Ram Kishor Prasad Yadav	Independent	11,043	17.32
Rabindra Prasad Yadav	Independent	10,750	16.86
Arun Kumar Gyawali	Independent	7,698	12.08
Rajesh Sah	Janamat Party	2,725	4.28
Tej Bahadur Bhagat	Nagrik Unmukti Party	1,111	1.74
Others		3,125	4.90
Total		63,742	100.00
Majority		354	
People's Socialist Party, Nepal hold			

=== Election in the 2010s ===
==== 2017 legislative elections ====
Party	Candidate	Votes
Federal Socialist Forum, Nepal	Ram Sahaya Yadav	28,185
Nepali Congress	Radhe Chandra Yadav	15,790
CPN (Maoist Centre)	Shiva Chandra Prasad Kushawaha	10,546
Others		1,834
Invalid votes		3,546
Result	FSFN gain	
Source: Election Commission

==== 2017 Nepalese provincial elections ====
===== 2(A) =====
Party	Candidate	Votes
Federal Socialist Forum, Nepal	Sarda Shankar Prasad Kalwar	16,671
Nepali Congress	Ram Prabesh Yadav	8,100
CPN (Maoist Centre)	Ganesh Prasad Sah Kalvar	4,279
Others		674
Invalid votes		879
Result	FSFN gain	
Source: Election Commission

===== 2(B) =====
Party	Candidate	Votes
Federal Socialist Forum, Nepal	Bachha Raut Ahir	11,503
Nepali Congress	Man Bushan Kumar Yadav	6,119
Independent	Jalandhar Singh Jaiswar	5,804
CPN (Unified Marxist–Leninist)	Ram Sagar Prasad Yadav	2,779
Others		923
Invalid votes		1,180
Result	FSFN gain	
Source: Election Commission

==== 2013 Constituent Assembly election ====
Party	Candidate	Votes
Nepali Congress	Radhe Chandra Yadav	8,867
Madhesi Jana Adhikar Forum, Nepal	Bachha Raut Ahir	4,505
UCPN (Maoist)	Ram Babu Prasad Yadav	4,362
Independent	Atmaram Prasad Sah	3,439
Madhesi Jana Adhikar Forum, Nepal (Democratic)	Mohammad Shani Thakurai	3,339
Sadhbhavana Party	Shiva Chandra Prakash Kushwaha	2,919
CPN (Unified Marxist–Leninist)	Basudev Prasad Yadav	2,565
Terai Madhes Loktantrik Party	Nawal Kishore Singh Rajput	2,465
Tarai Madesh Sadbhwana Party Nepal	Prayag Raya Yadav	2,237
Rastriya Madhesh Samajbadi Party	Samsul Hoda	1,432
Others		2,680
Result	Congress gain	
Source: NepalNews

=== Election in the 2000s ===
==== 2008 Constituent Assembly election ====
Party	Candidate	Votes
CPN (Maoist)	Shiva Chandra Prasad Kushawaha	10,991
Madhesi Jana Adhikar Forum, Nepal	Bachha Raut Ahir	10,584
Nepali Congress	Radhe Chandra Yadav	9,635
Terai Madhes Loktantrik Party	Prayag Raj Yadav	6,007
CPN (Unified Marxist–Leninist)	Rajendra Prasad Kalvar	3,459
Others		3,409
Invalid votes		3,805
Result	Maoist gain	
Source: Election Commission

=== Election in the 1990s ===
==== 1999 legislative elections ====
Party	Candidate	Votes
CPN (Unified Marxist–Leninist)	Sohan Prasad Chaudhary	22,910
Nepali Congress	Radhe Chandra Yadav	19,366
Rastriya Prajatantra Party	Prem Prasad Sah	4,201
Independent	Sani Thakurai	1,265
CPN (Marxist–Leninist)	Palat Chaudhary Tharu	1,260
Others		1,902
Invalid Votes		1,057
Result	Congress gain	
Source: Election Commission

==== 1994 legislative elections ====
Party	Candidate	Votes
Nepali Congress	Radhe Chandra Yadav	14,403
CPN (Unified Marxist–Leninist)	Sohan Prasad Chaudhary	14,150
Rastriya Prajatantra Party	Chandra Shah	9,709
Nepal Sadbhawana Party	Thakur Prasad Yadav	2,108
Others		1,146
Result	Congress gain	
Source: Election Commission

==== 1991 legislative elections ====
Party	Candidate	Votes
CPN (Unified Marxist–Leninist)	Sohan Prasad Chaudhary	14,307
Nepali Congress	Radhe Chandra Yadav	13,357
Result	CPN (UML) gain	

== See also ==
- List of parliamentary constituencies of Nepal
