= Bachha Raut Ahir =

Nepalese politician

Honourable Bachha Raut Ahir
- बच्चा राउत अहिर

Province Assembly Member of Madhesh Province
- Incumbent
- Assumed office 2017
- Preceded by: N/A
- Constituency: Bara 2 (constituency)

Personal details
- Party: People's Socialist Party, Nepal
- Occupation: Politician

Bachha Raut Ahir (Nepali: बच्चा राउत अहिर) is a Nepalese politician. He is a member of Provincial Assembly of Madhesh Province from People's Socialist Party, Nepal. Ahir, a resident of Suwarna Rural Municipality, was elected via 2017 Nepalese provincial elections from Bara 2(B).

== Electoral history ==
=== 2017 Nepalese provincial elections ===
Party	Candidate	Votes
Federal Socialist Forum, Nepal	Bachha Raut Ahir	11,503
Nepali Congress	Man Bushan Kumar Yadav	6,119
Independent	Jalandhar Singh Jaiswar	5,804
CPN (Unified Marxist–Leninist)	Ram Sagar Prasad Yadav	2,779
Others		923
Invalid votes		1,180
Result	FSFN gain	
Source: Election Commission
