= List of Nepalese provinces by life expectancy =

Nepal is divided into seven provinces.The current system of seven provinces replaced an earlier system where Nepal was divided into 14 administrative zones which were grouped into five development regions.

According to alternative estimation of the United Nations, in 2023 life expectancy in Nepal was 70.35 years total (68.84 for male, 71.84 for female).

== Estimations of the Global Data Lab ==
region	2023			
region	overall	male	female	F∆M
Nepal	70.35	68.84	71.84	3.00
Gandaki	72.61	70.96	74.54	3.58
Bagmati	72.45	70.81	74.36	3.55
Koshi	70.95	69.40	72.55	3.15
Lumbini	69.77	68.28	71.13	2.85
Madhesh	69.48	70.79	68.01	2.78
Karnali	69.09	70.30	67.63	2.67
Sudurpaschim	68.66	67.22	69.79	2.57
