= Prashurampur =

Prashurampur प्रशुरामपुर
- Village
- Nickname: Viswa Prashurampur
- Location in Nepal
- Coordinates: 26.932250°N 85.041545°E
- Country: Nepal
- Province: Madhesh
- District: Bara
- Rural Municipality: Suwarna Rural Municipality

Population (1991)
  - Total: 2,403
- This data is from when it was a VDC. Current population is incorporated into Suwarna Rural Municipality.
- Time zone: UTC+5:45 (NST)
- Postal Code: 44400
- Area code: 053

Prashurampur (Nepali: प्रशुरामपुर) is a village located in Suwarna Rural Municipality of Bara District in Madhesh Province, Nepal. It was formerly a Village Development Committee (VDC) prior to the administrative restructuring of local bodies in Nepal in March 2017. At the time of the 1991 Nepal census, the then-Prasurampur VDC had a population of 2,403 persons living in 377 individual households.

== History ==
The village of Prasurampur gained its current administrative status as a part of Suwarna Rural Municipality following the local body restructuring in Nepal in March 2017. Before this, Prasurampur functioned as an independent Village Development Committee (VDC).

== Geography ==
Prasurampur is situated in the flat plains of the Terai region, characteristic of Bara District, and is generally characterized by fertile agricultural land. The region experiences a humid subtropical climate.

== Demographics ==
As part of Suwarna Rural Municipality, Prashurampur shares in its broader demographic characteristics. According to the 2021 Nepal Census, Suwarna Rural Municipality had a total population of 35,141 persons living in 5,073 households. Of this total population, 17,665 were male and 17,476 were female.

The population of Suwarna Rural Municipality, and thus generally reflecting Prashurampur, is diverse.

- Languages: Bhojpuri is the most widely spoken language in Bara District (around 73.9%), followed by Tharu (around 8.6%) and Nepali (around 8.6%). Urdu and Bajjika are also spoken by significant minorities.

== Economy ==
The primary economic activity in Prasurampur, like much of the Terai region, is agriculture. Main crops grown typically include paddy (rice), wheat, maize, and various vegetables. Livestock farming is also common among households. Local small businesses and shops cater to daily needs, and a portion of the population may rely on remittances from family members working abroad or in other parts of Nepal.

== Culture and Lifestyle ==
The culture and lifestyle in Prashurampur are influenced by its diverse ethnic and religious composition. Major festivals celebrated include:

- Eid al-Fitr and Eid al-Adha (Muslim festivals)
- Dashain and Tihar (Hindu festivals)
- Chhath (a significant festival in the Terai)

Local customs and traditions are often closely tied to these religious observances and agricultural cycles.

== Infrastructure ==
- Education: Presence of a local primary school, with secondary education typically available in nearby larger settlements.
- Healthcare: A basic health post or access to community health workers, with more comprehensive medical facilities in nearby towns like Kalaiya or Birgunj.
- Transportation: Access to local roads, possibly connecting to a provincial or national highway, with public transport services (buses, micro-buses, tempos) available.
- Utilities: Access to electricity grid, community or private water sources (wells, hand pumps), and increasing access to mobile network coverage and internet services.

== See also ==
- Suwarna Rural Municipality
- Bara District
- Madhesh Province
- Village Development Committee (Nepal) (for historical context)
