= Radhe Chandra Yadav =

Nepali politician

- राधेचन्द्र यादव

Member of the Constituent Assembly
- In office 21 January 2014 – 14 October 2017
- Preceded by: Shiva Chandra Prasad Kushawaha
- Succeeded by: Ram Sahaya Yadav (as Member of Parliament)
- Constituency: Bara 2

Member of Parliament, Pratinidhi Sabha
- In office 14 December 1994 – 15 January 1999
- Preceded by: Sohan Prasad Chaudhary
- Succeeded by: Sohan Prasad Chaudhary
- Constituency: Bara 2

Personal details
- Party: Nepali Congress

Radhe Chandra Yadav (Nepali: राधेचन्द्र यादव) is a member of 2nd Nepalese Constituent Assembly. He won Bara–2 seat in CA assembly, 2013 from Nepali Congress.
