= 2023 Nepalese vice presidential election =

Vice presidential election in Nepal

- 17 March 2023
- Registered: 881
Candidate	Ram Sahaya Yadav	Asta Laxmi Shakya	Mamata Jha
Party	PSP-Nepal	CPN (UML)	Janamat
Electoral vote	30,328	16,328	2,537
Percentage	61.59%	33.16%	5.15%
Vice President before election
Nanda Kishor Pun
Maoist Centre
Elected Vice President
Ram Sahaya Yadav
PSP-Nepal

The election to elect the third vice president of Nepal was held on 17 March 2023.

The term of the incumbent vice president, Nanda Kishor Pun, first elected in 2015, was set to expire on 17 March 2023. He was term-limited and could not seek re-election, with the Constitution of Nepal barring him from doing so.

As Article 70 of the Constitution prohibits the vice president of being from the same sex and community as the president, and with Ram Chandra Poudel, a Khas Arya male, elected president, only candidates who were from non Khas Arya ethnicity or female were allowed to file their nominations for the election.

== Electoral process ==
The Vice President of Nepal is elected by the majority of the votes of all members of the electoral colleges. If no candidate is elected, a second round is held between the top two candidates of the first round, under the same majority. As the latter is of the total votes including blank and invalid ones as well as abstentions, it is possible no candidate is elected in the first and second rounds. A third may then be held with the same candidates as in the second. The candidate with the majority of valid votes is then elected vice president.

Part 6, Article 64 of the Constitution of Nepal 2015 sets the following qualifications for holding the presidency:

1. A person shall be eligible to be president if he/she fulfils the following qualifications:
  - He/she is eligible to be a member of the Federal Parliament.
  - He/she has attained at least 45 years of age, and
  - Is not ineligible by any law.
2. Notwithstanding anything contained in clause (1), a person who has already been elected president for two terms, shall not be eligible to be a presidential candidate for the presidential election thereafter.

== Election schedule ==
The Election Commission announced the schedule for the vice presidential elections on 30 January 2023.

Vice-presidential election schedule
22 February	Publication of initial electoral roll
22 – 24 February	Claims and scrutiny on electoral roll
24 February	Publication of final electoral roll
9 March	Presidential election
11 March	Nomination of candidates
11 – 12 March	Scrutiny on nominations
12 March	Publication of final list of nominations
17 March	Date of election

== Electoral college ==
The electoral college is composed in 2023 of 881 members, of which 331 are from the federal parliament and 550 from the provincial assemblies, with a vote "weight" of 79 and 48 each, respectively. While the federal parliament is made of 275 members from the lower house and 59 from the upper one, 2 members of the lower house were unable to be registered in the electoral college because of a judicial affair and a third one died, thus lowering the electoral college total from the normal number of 884 to 881, and the grand total of weighted votes from 52,786 to 52,549.

=== Electoral college composition ===
Composition
Party	Pratinidhi Sabha	Rastriya Sabha	Pradesh Sabha	Total electors
Nepali Congress	88 (Note: excluding 1 suspended MP)	10	175	273
CPN (UML)	79	18	162	259
CPN (Maoist Centre)	31	16	85	132
CPN (Unified Socialist)	10	8	25	43
Rastriya Prajatantra Party	14	0	28	42
People's Socialist Party	11	3	23	37
Janamat Party	6	0	16	22
Rastriya Swatantra Party	19	0	0	19
Loktantrik Samajwadi Party	4	1	12	17
Nagarik Unmukti Party	4	0	12	16
Nepal Majdoor Kisan Party	1	0	3	4
Rastriya Janamorcha	1	1	1	3
Nepal Socialist Party	1	0	2	3
Hamro Nepali Party	0	0	2	2
Independent	3	2	4	9
Total	272 (Note: excluding 2 vacant seats and 1 suspended MP)	59	550	881

=== Electoral college vote value composition ===
Party	Pratinidhi Sabha	Rastriya Sabha	Pradesh Sabha	Total votes	Percentage
Nepali Congress	6,952	790	8,400	16,142	30.72
CPN (UML)	6,241	1,422	7,776	15,439	29.38
CPN (Maoist Centre)	2,449	1,264	4,080	7,793	14.83
CPN (Unified Socialist)	790	632	1,200	2,622	4.99
Rastriya Prajatantra Party	1,106	0	1,344	2,450	4.66
People's Socialist Party	869	237	1,104	2,210	4.21
Rastriya Swatantra Party	1501	0	0	1,501	2.86
Janamat Party	474	0	768	1,242	2.36
Loktantrik Samajwadi Party	316	79	576	971	1.85
Nagarik Unmukti Party	316	0	576	892	1.70
Nepal Majdoor Kisan Party	79	0	144	223	0.42
Rastriya Janamorcha	79	79	48	206	0.39
Nepal Socialist Party	79	0	96	175	0.33
Hamro Nepali Party	0	0	96	96	0.18
Independent	237	158	192	587	1.12
Total	21,488	4,661	26,400	52,549	100

== Candidates ==
On 11 March, a total of four candidates filed their nominations for the vice-presidential election. Three candidacies were filed from the ruling eight-party alliance; Ram Sahaya Yadav and Pramila Yadav of the PSPN and Mamata Jha of the Janamat Party. The opposition CPN (UML) put forward party vice-chair, Astalaxmi Shakya as its vice-presidential candidate.

Complaints were lodged against the candidacy of Ram Sahaya Yadav, by both the CPN (UML) and Janamat Party candidates, claiming the candidacy by Yadav is against the constitutional and legal provisions, as the constitution calls for the president and vice president to be of different genders or community. The electoral commission had initially announced that it was interpreting this as meaning vice president candidates had to be of both different gender and different community, prompting the PSPN to also propose the candidacy of Pramila Yadav. However, the Election Commission eventually changed opinion and quashed the complaints, ruling that Yadav's candidacy was lawful by concluding that legal provisions only require the president and the vice president to be from a different gender or a different community. Following this, the PSPN decided to withdraw the candidacy of Pramila Yadav.

=== People's Socialist Party, Nepal ===
Candidate	Born	Positions held	Province	Announced	Ref
Ram Sahaya Yadav	24 July 1970 (age 56); Bara, Madhesh	Minister for Forests and Environment (2021–2022); Member of House of Representatives from Bara (2018–present); Member of the Constituent Assembly of Nepal from party list (2008–2012)	Madhesh	9 March 2023	

=== Communist Party of Nepal (Unified Marxist–Leninist) ===
Candidate	Born	Positions held	Province	Announced	Ref
Astalaxmi Shakya	30 September 1953 (age 73); Kathmandu, Bagmati	Chief Minister of Bagmati Province (2021); Minister for Industry (2008–2009); Minister for Women, Children and Social Welfare (2004–2005); Member of the House of Representatives (1999–2008); Member of the Bagmati Provincial Assembly (2018–2022)	Bagmati	11 March 2023	

=== Janamat Party ===
Candidate	Born	Positions held	Province	Announced	Ref
Mamata Jha	1968 (age 57–58); Madhesh	N/A	Madhesh	11 March 2023	

== Results ==
Results
Candidate	Party	Votes			Total votes	%
Candidate	Party	Federal	Provincial	Total	Total votes	%
Ram Sahaya Yadav	PSP-N	184	329	513	30,328	61.59
Asta Laxmi Shakya	CPN (UML)	104	169	273	16,328	33.16
Mamata Jha	Janamat	23	15	38	2,537	5.15
Pramila Yadav (withdrawn)	PSP-N	0	1	1	48	0.10
Valid votes		311	514	825	49,241	99.52
Blank and invalid votes		0	4	4	192	0.48
Total		311	518	829	49,433	100
Registered voters / turnout		331	550	881	52,549	94.10

== See also ==
- 2023 Nepalese presidential election
