= Ram Sahaya Yadav =

Vice President of Nepal since 2023

- रामसहाय यादव

Vice President of Nepal
- Incumbent
- Assumed office 20 March 2023
- President: Ram Chandra Paudel
- Prime Minister: See list: Pushpa Kamal Dahal; K. P. Sharma Oli; Sushila Karki (interim); Balen Shah
- Preceded by: Nanda Kishor Pun

Minister of Forests and Environment of Nepal
- In office 8 October 2021 – 3 July 2022
- President: Bidya Devi Bhandari
- Prime Minister: Sher Bahadur Deuba
- Preceded by: Krishna Gopal Shrestha
- Succeeded by: Pradeep Yadav

Member of Parliament, Pratinidhi Sabha
- In office 4 March 2018 – 20 March 2023
- Preceded by: Radhe Chandra Yadav (as Member of the Constituent Assembly)
- Succeeded by: Upendra Yadav
- Constituency: Bara 2

Member of the Constituent Assembly
- In office 28 May 2008 – 28 May 2012
- Constituency: Party list (Madheshi Jana Adhikar Forum)

Personal details
- Born: 24 July 1971 (age 55) Baswariya Tole, Nepal
- Party: Nepal Sadbhawana Party; MJF-N; Federal Socialist Forum; People's Socialist Party, Nepal
- Spouse: Champa Devi Yadav
- Children: 3
- Education: SLK College (BS); Thakur Ram Multiple Campus (BEd)
- Website: http://vpn.gov.np/en/

Ram Sahaya Prasad Yadav (born 24 July 1971) is a Nepali politician who has served as the 3rd Vice President of Nepal since 2023. Prior to his tenure as vice president he was a member of the Federal Parliament of Nepal from 2018 to 2023, and Minister for Forest and Environment from 2022 to 2023.

== Early life and education ==
Ram Sahaya Prasad Yadav was born on 24 July 1971, in Baswariya Tole, Nepal, to Sihwa Devi Yadav and Prasad Ray Yadav. Yadav is a member of the Madheshi people and his family were farmers. He was educated at the Shree Nepal National Primary School in the Basbariya Rural Municipality and the Shree Janata Lower Secondary School in Kachorwa. He passed the science and mathematics I.S.C. at Bihar Intermediate Education Council in 1990. He graduated with a bachelor of science degree from SLK College in 1993, and a Bachelor of Education degree from Thakur Ram Multiple Campus in 1998.

== Career ==
From 1991 to 2008, Yadav worked as a science and mathematics teacher at the Shree Pannadevi Kanya Secondary School in Kalaiya.

Yadav joined the Nepal Sadbhawana Party (NSP) in 1990. He attended the 3rd, 4th, and 5th conventions of the NSP. He was the first chair of the Madheshi Jana Adhikar Forum, Nepal (MJFN). The Federal Socialist Party and MJFN merged to form the Federal Socialist Forum, Nepal (FSFN), which Yadav was general secretary of in 2015.

In the 2008 election Yadav won a seat in the 1st Nepalese Constituent Assembly, but did not win a seat in the 2nd Nepalese Constituent Assembly. In the 2017 election Yadav was elected to the 1st session of the Federal Parliament of Nepal from Bara 2 after defeating Nepali Congress nominee Radhe Chandra Yadav. He won reelection in 2022.

Prime Minister Sher Bahadur Deuba selected Yadav to serve as Minister for Forest and Environment in his cabinet. Yadav won the vice-presidency in the 2023 election as the nominee of the People's Socialist Party, Nepal (PSP-N).

== Personal life ==
Yadav married Champa Devi Yadav, with whom he had three children.

== Works cited ==
=== News ===
- "Ram Sahay Prasad Yadav wins Vice President race". The Kathmandu Post. 17 March 2023. Archived from the original on 2 July 2025.
- "SSFN Ramsahaya Yadav emerges victorious from Bara-2". The Kathmandu Post. 10 December 2017. Archived from the original on 2 July 2025.

=== Web ===
- "2017 Election Results" (PDF). Election Commission. Archived (PDF) from the original on 2 July 2025.
- "Office of the Vice President of Nepal". Vice President of Nepal. Archived from the original on 2 July 2025.

Political offices
Preceded by Nanda Kishor Pun	Vice President of Nepal; 2023–present	Incumbent
