= Community forestry in Nepal =

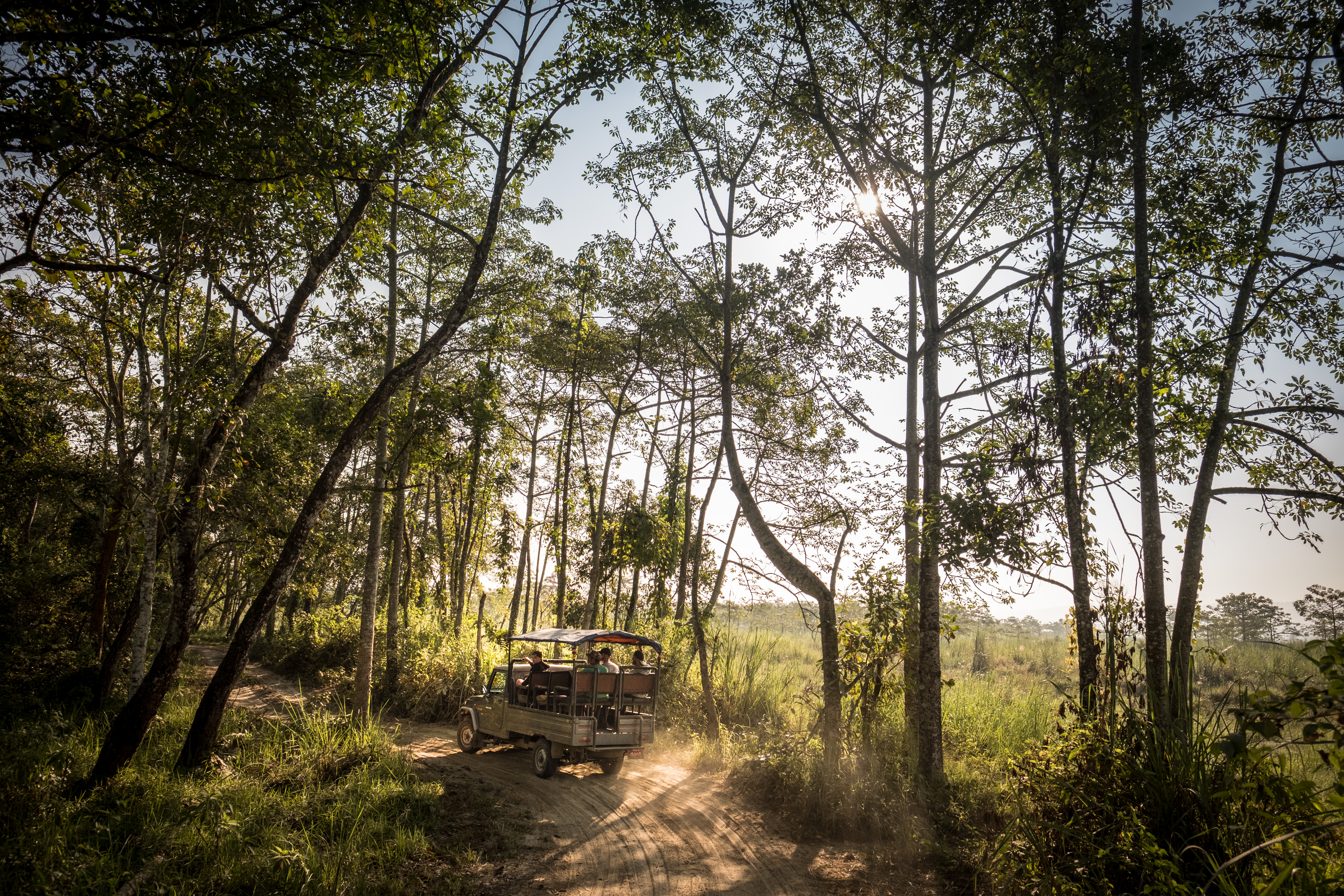
November 2017. Kumrose Community Forest, Kumrose, Nepal. Photograph by Jason Houston for USAID

The community forestry program in Nepal is a government effort to reduce forest degradation and to promote sustainable forestry practices as well as to improve the livelihood of the community. It incorporates distinct policies, institutions and practices. The two main goals of the community forestry program is to empower local communities whilst encouraging environmental conservation benefits on the Himalayan forests.

Nepal has become one of the first developing nations to adopt a community forestry management program which gives authority to the community and groups to manage forest resources. As a result, Nepal now stands as one of the leaders in community based forest management as they have made direct progress in halting environmental degradation and by regenerating forests in barren areas. Studies have proven the potential benefits that community forestry will have in combating environmental degradation as well as utilizing resources in a sufficient manner.

== Governance ==
Prior to the community forestry program, the Government of Nepal had control of local forests during the mid 1950s. The community forestry project came into fruition during the late 1970s, when there was a great concern for environmental sustainability and the degrading Himalayan slopes. The continuing growing population put a strain on the resources and the government was seeking methods in order to protect their forests whilst achieving better livelihoods of the Nepali people. The government came to the conclusion that they needed active participation of local people in forest management in order to further reduce the environmental degradation in the Himalayan slopes.

The first institutional shift began in 1978 when the forest regulation of Panchayat Forest and Panchayat-protected Forest Rules allowed local governments the right to oversee and manage selected forest areas. An even greater shift began in the early 1990s under the Forest Act 1993. This act enacted even greater government decentralisation and allowed local communities to have direct access and management over the forests that they depend on for resources. However, that is not to say that the government has not forfeited their ownership of the forests. The state still maintains ownership while communities have the rights to utilize and manage the forests. The Forest Act 1993 and Forest Regulation 1995 guaranteed two rights: 1) right to self-governance and 2) right to forest management and utilisation.

== Effects ==
=== People ===
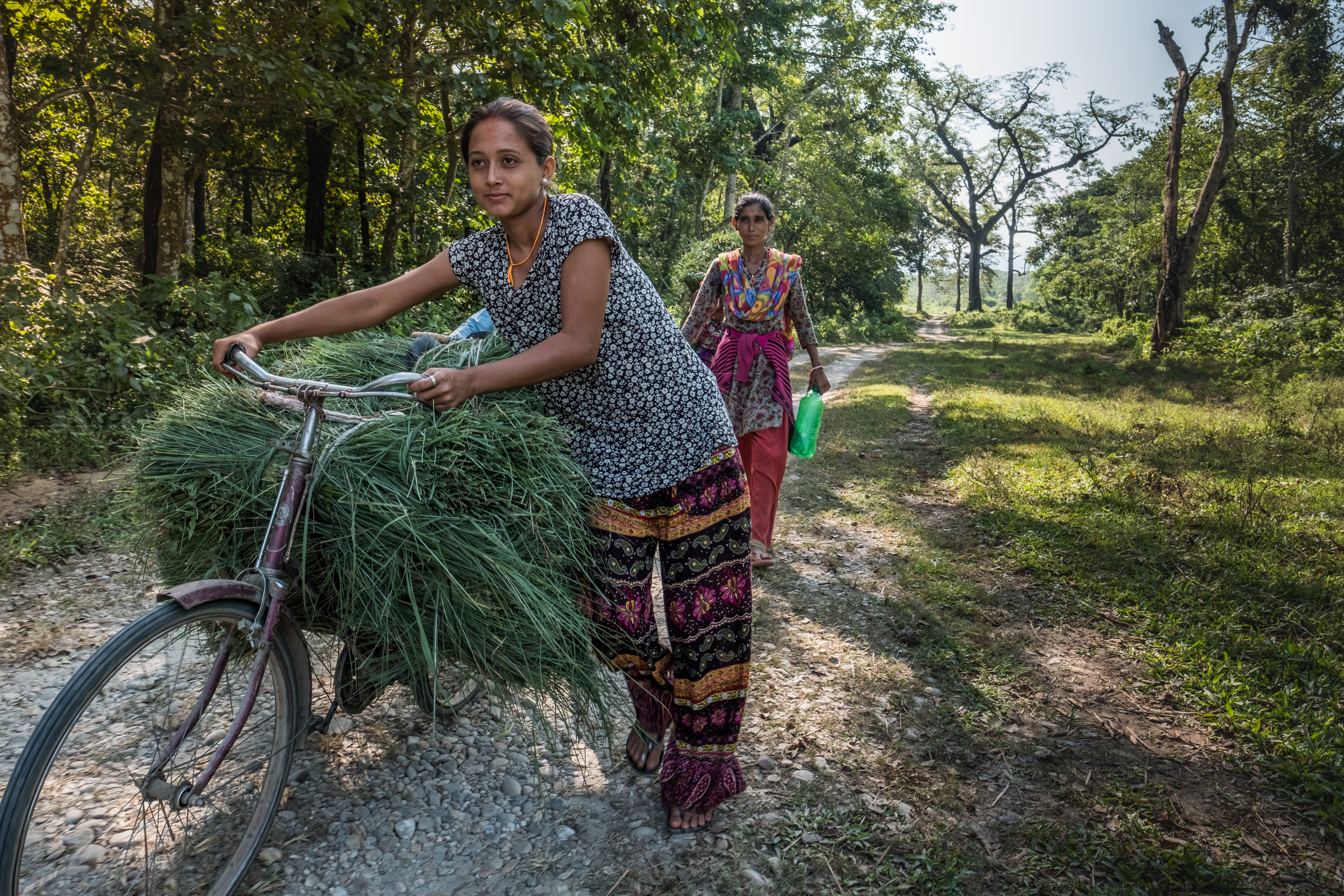
November 2017. Kumrose, Nepal. Photograph by Jason Houston for USAID

One of the two main goals under the community forestry program in Nepal was to alleviate poverty as well as improve the general livelihoods of the Nepali people. Various forms of discrimination on the basis of caste, economic status, ethnicity, gender, age and vulnerability exist in Nepal. This program's key objective was to increase the participation and empower the socially-marginalized peoples, allowing decision-making abilities within the community.

Due to the program's overall success, one fourth of national forests in Nepal are under the community management where 1.6 million households are included as community forest user groups. There are over 19,000 community forest user groups.

Within the community forestry user groups there are wealthy, middle income, and low-income households that participate in the forest resource management. The contribution between the different socio-economic households and forest management is relatively equal. Resources within the forests such as fuelwood, timber, as well as fodder are used by the locals to generate income from sales. The program encouraged community development work that has had a direct effect on lower income households. Due to community development activities, they are able to generate daily incomes for the betterment of their livelihoods.

However, there has been question regarding the incentives created to allow the involvement of socio-marginalized peoples within the community forestry program. Wealthy households have greater decision-making power when it comes to forest management and governance. This puts those who are of lower caste, women, and so on in a position of lower decision-making authority as well as participation within the program. Wealthier households have greater access to state administrators allowing them to dominate decision-making positions. Because they are able to set forest resource prices, this can reduce incentives for poorer households who cannot afford the high prices to participate. For the community forestry program to reach and maintain its goal of the improvement of the livelihoods of the Nepali people, creating incentives of disadvantaged groups is crucial to development.

=== Environment ===
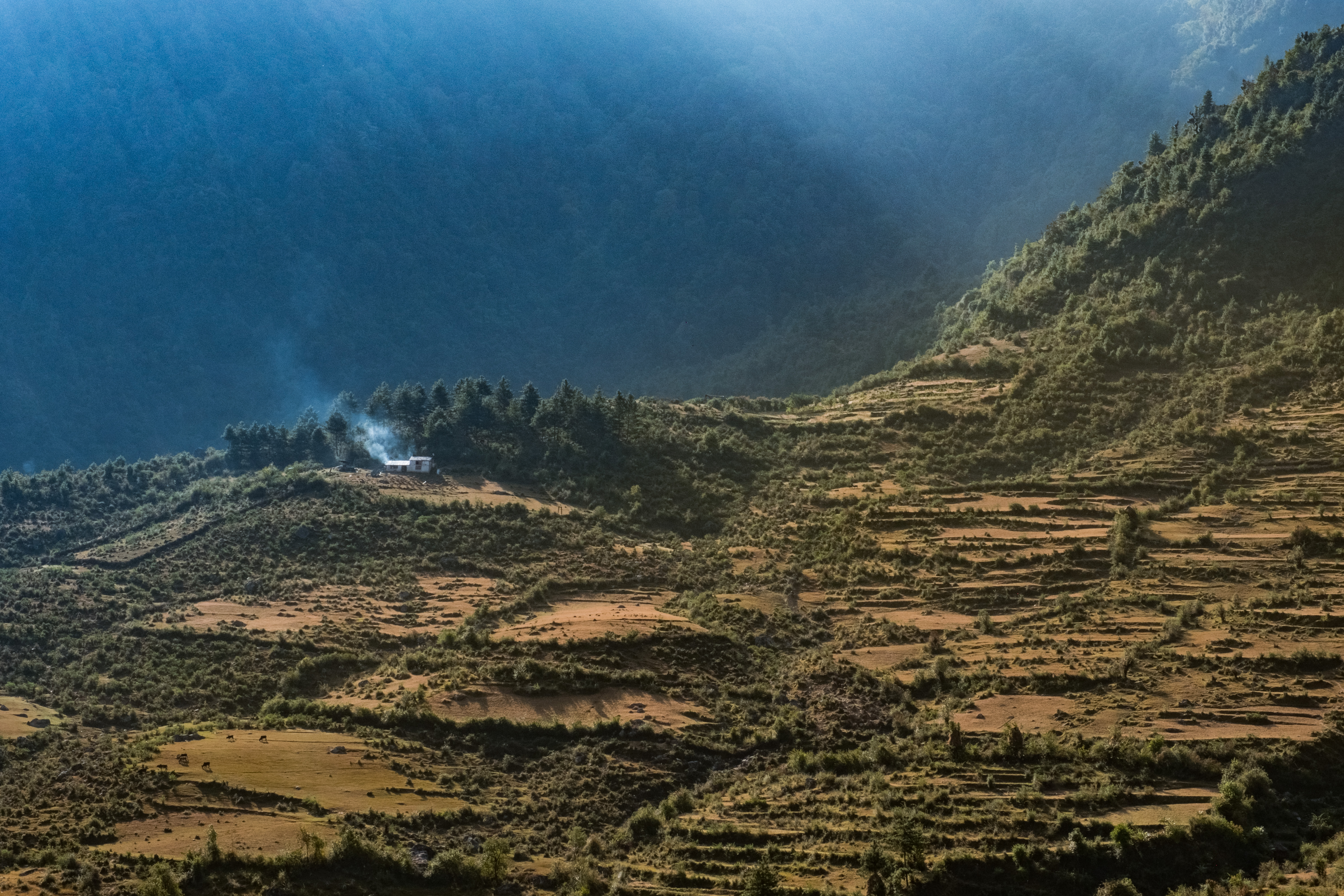
October 2017. Kailas, Bajhang District, Nepal. Photograph by Jason Houston for USAID

One of the main drivers for the implementation of the community forestry program in Nepal was to reduce the effects of environmental degradation and to improve the conditions of the Himalayan forests. According to one study, biodiversity in community forestry program plots was significantly higher than non-community forestry plots in forests in Terai.

The overall effects of the community forestry program include the increase of biodiversity from the result of rejuvenating and expanding the diversity species of trees and plants. It is evident that the community's active participation on forest management had a positive effect on increasing biodiversity and forest coverage on the once barren slopes. Although there has not been comprehensive studies assessing the implementation of community forestry and improved forest conditions, it is evident through general observation and case studies that there has been indications of progress in overall forest conditions.
