= Pacharauta =

Pacharauta पचरौता
- Municipality
- Location in Nepal
- Coordinates: 26.89°N 85.07°E
- Country: Nepal
- Development Region: Central
- Zone: Narayani Zone
- District: Bara District
- Province: Madhesh
- Established: 2022 A.D. (2079 B.S.)

Government
  - Mayor: Jalandhar Singh Jaiswar (जलन्धर सिंह जैसवार)
  - Deputy Mayor: Nasima Khatun (नसिमा खातुन)

Area
  - Total: 44.01 km^{2} (16.99 sq mi)

Population (2021)
  - Total: 40,524
  - Density: 921/km^{2} (2,390/sq mi)
  - Religions: Hindu Muslim Christian Buddhist

Languages
  - Local: Bhojpuri, Tharu, Nepali,Urdu,Hindi
- Time zone: UTC+5:45 (NST)
- Postal Code: 44400
- Area code: 053
- Website: www.pachrautamun.gov.np

Pacharauta (Nepali: पचरौता ) is a municipality in Bara District in Madhesh Province of southeastern Nepal. It was formed in 2016 occupying current nine sections (wards) from previous 9 former VDCs. It occupies an area of 44.01 km^{2} with a total population of 40,524.

Farming is the main occupation of the people of this municipality. Some of the people are also involved in government service and small home trade. India (Bihar border) is in the south of this municipality.

== Geography ==
Pachrauta municipality border by India with East Champaran of Bihar State in the south while in the north Adarsh Kotwali Gaupalika, KaraiyaMai Gaupalika and Baragadhi Nagarpalika, in east Adarsh Kotwali Gaupalika and Simraungarh Nagrpalika while in west Suwarn Gaupalika, Mahagadhi Mai and India with East Champaran of Bihar State.

=== Climate ===
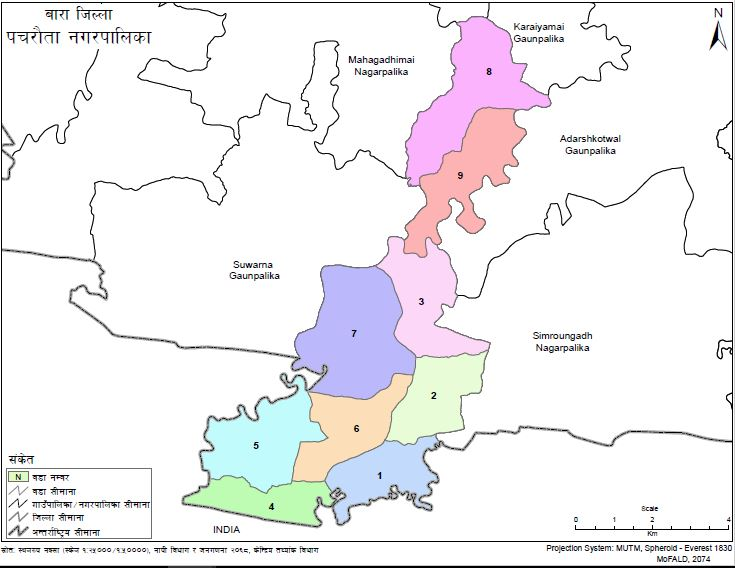

It has a hot climate with an average rainfall of 2 cm. According to the 2011 census, it had 8,535 households with a population of 40,282; 22,040 males and 18,042 females with an average household size of 4.72. The geographic location of Pachrauta Municipality is 26° 51′ 36″ N, latitude and 85° 4′ 48″ E, longitude.

== Health ==
According to Ministry of Health, there are no health institutions in Pacharauta Municipality.

== Municipal Income and Expenditure ==
The government of Nepal has allocated 363.459 million Nepali Rupees for fiscal year 2017.

== Educational Status ==
The overall literacy rate (for population age five years and above) increased from 90.9% in 2017 to 99.5% in 2019. The male literacy rate was 99.3% compared to the female literacy rate of 79.4%. There is one government school (Shree Nepal Rastiya Secondary School Piparpati) near Piparpati market, where studying up to bachelor's degree in education (B.Ed.), and Intermediate in Education (I.Ed) and also very soon there will be start Science and Mathematics. From last four years, 2016 in this also a Technical Education class is in the process. This Technical Education class Verify and monitored by CTEVT Nepal. The course start from class 9th to 12th (full four year computer engineering course).

Following are the Educational institutes in this municipality.

1. Shree Nepal Rastriya Secondary School, Pachrauta 1, Piparpati
2. Shree Nepal Rsatriya Secondary School, Pachrauta 4, Beldari
3. Shree Nepal Rastriya Secondary School, Pachrauta 7, Benauli
4. Shree Nepal Rastriya Middle Secondary School, Pachrauta 6, Pakadiya
5. Shree Nepal Rastriya Primary School, Pachrauta 1, Piparpati
6. Gyandeep English Boarding School, Pachrauta 1, Piparpati
7. Progress English Boarding School, Pachrauta 1, Piparpati
8. Shree New Kankali English Boarding School, Pachrauta 7, Benauli
9. Shree Nepal Rastriya Primary School, Pachrauta 5, Gulariya
10. Shree Nepal Rastriya Primary School, Pachrauta 7, Sakhuwat
11. Shree Nepal Rastriya Primary School, Pachrauta 7, Bhawanipur
12. Shree Jan Chetna Primary School, Pachrauta 7, Bharmnagar
13. Shree Nepal Rastriya Middle Secondary School, Pachrauta 9, Kudawa
14. Shree Nepal Rastriya Primary School, Pachrauta 9, Baldushwa
15. Shree Nepal Rastriya Primary School, Pachrauta 8, Amarpati
16. Shree Bal tatha Mahila Primary School, Pachrauta 8, Amarpati
17. Shree Nepal Rastriya Primary School, Pachrauta 8, Amarpati Bajopati
18. Shree Nepal Rastriya Primary School, Pachrauta 3, Ramnagar
19. Shree Nepal Rastriya Middle Secondary School, Pachrauta 3, Bhathi Tola
20. Shree Nepal Rastriya Primary School, Pachrauta 2, Bargachhi
21. Shree Nepal Rastriya Primary School, Pachrauta 2, Shrinagar Bairiya
22. Shree Dalit Primary School, Pachrauta 1, Harpur
23. Shree Gobind Baba Primary School, Pachrauta 1, Piparpati
24. Shree Nepal Rastriya Primary School, Pachrauta 2, Bisunpur

== Wards ==
=== Merged VDC ===
Village development committee VDCs Under this municipality
Ward No	VDCs Name	population (2011)	Male	Female	Total Household
1	Piparpati Pachrauta ( Ward 1–9)	5,033	2,541	2,492	741
2	ShriNagar Bairiya (Ward 3 & 7)	3,555	1,817	1,738	451
2	Bisunpur (Ward 1 & 2)	3,555	1,817	1,738	451
3	ShriNagar Bairiya (Ward 1,2,8 & 9)	2,566	1,313	1,253	375
4	Pakadya Chikani (Ward 9)	3,306	1,694	1,612	427
4	Beldari (Ward 1–4, & 9)	3,306	1,694	1,612	427
5	Pakadiya Chikani (Ward 1 & 8)	3,344	1,795	1,549	433
5	Beldari (Ward 5 & 8)	3,344	1,795	1,549	433
6	Pakadiya Chikani (Ward 2 & 7)	3,360	1,745	1,615	448
7	Benauli (Ward 1–9)	5,108	2,666	2,442	746
8	Amarpatti (Ward 1–9)	3,738	1,874	1,864	508
9	kudawa (Ward 1–9)	4,163	2,093	2,070	578
Total		34,173	17,538	16,635	4,707

=== Ward No. 1 ===
Ward Office: - Piparpati Pachrauta

Includes VDC:- Piparpati Pachrauta (Ward 1 - 9)

Total Area: - 3.43 (Square K.M.)

Total Population: - 5033 (2011)

Ward Contact Person Name, Post, and Contact

Ward Contact Person Name, Post, and Contact
SN	Name	Post	Contact
1	Shri. Jagat Narayan Prasad Yadav	Ward Chairman	9845548790
2	Shri. Mahaboob Alam Mansuri	Ward secretary	9819201300
3	Shri. Chandra Shekhar Prasad Sah	Ward Member	9807101844
4	Shri. Rashid Miya Mansuri	Ward Member	9817203673
5	Shri. Devwanti Devi	Ward backwards Female Member	-
6	Shri. Ful Kumari Devi	Ward Female Member	-

=== Ward No. 2 ===
Ward Office: - Sri Nagar Bairiya

Includes VDC: - Bisunpur (Ward 1 & 2) and Sri Nagar Bairiya (Ward 3 & 7)

Total Area: 3.87 (Square K.M.)

Total Population: - 3555 (2011)

Ward Contact Person Name, Post, and Contact

Ward Contact Person Name, Post, and Contact
SN	Name	Post	Contact
1	Shree Manoj Yadav	Ward Chairman	9855045094
2	Shree Rajaram Prasad Yadav	Ward secretary	9811106131
3	Shreejajul Hak Ansari	Ward Member	9823684201
4	Shree Vishwanath Raut	Ward Member	9806847863
5	Shree Satiya Devi Tatmin	Ward Backwards Female Member	96815279013
6	Shree Madhu Devi Kalwarin	Ward Female Member	9817253661

=== Ward No. 3 ===
Ward Office: - Sri Nagar Bairiya

Includes Vdc: - Sri Nagar Bairiya (Ward 1, 2, 8 & 9)

Total Area: - 4.58 (Square K.M.)

Total Population: - 2566 (2011)

Ward Contact Person Name, Post, and Contact

Ward Contact Person Name, Post, and Contact
SN	Name	Post	Contact
1	Shree Dhenuk Raut Kurmi	Ward Chairman	9855048787
2	Shree Prabhu Pandit	Ward secretary	9825235902
3	Shree Anurudh Mahato Koiri	Ward Member	9804273028
4	Shree Mahant Lal Yadav	Ward Member	9804274583
5	Shree Anita Devi	Ward backwards Female Member	9864084260
6	Shree Girija Devi Ahirin	Ward Female Member	-

=== Ward No. 4 ===
Ward Office: - Beldari

Includes Vdc: - Beldari (Ward 1, 2, 3, 4 & 9) and Pakadiya Chikani (Ward 9)

Total Area: - 4.12 (Square K.M.)

Total Population: - 3306 (2011)

Ward Contact Person Name, Post, and Contact

Ward Contact Person Name, Post, and Contact
SN	Name	Post	Contact
1	Shree Kanihya Lal Yadav	Ward Chairman	9855048794
2	Shree Suresh Prasad Yadav	Ward secretary	9843533558
3	Shree Jag Sah Kanu	Ward Member	-
4	Shree Nagendra Prasad Yadav	Ward Member	9807221262
5	Shree Rita Devi Ram	Ward backwards Female Member	9819276138
6	Shree Anita Yadav	Ward Female Member	9803588504

=== Ward No. 5 ===
Ward Office: - Beldari

Includes Vdc: - Beldari (Ward 5 & 8) and Pakadiya Chikani (Ward 1 & 8)

Total Area: - 4.38 (Square K.M.)

Total Population: - 3344 (2011)

Ward Contact Person Name, Post, and Contact

Ward Contact Person Name, Post, and Contact
SN	Name	Post	Contact
1	Shree Laxmi Yadav	Ward Chairman	9855048795
2	Shree Suresh Prasad Yadav	Ward secretary	9843533558
3	Shree Gyasudin Ansari	Ward Member	9821893325
4	Shree Dilbandhu Sah	Ward Member	9814292954
5	Shree Chandra Kali Devi Baitha	Ward backwards Female Member	9811182275
6	Shree Indu Shriwastav	Ward Female Member	9812276555

=== Ward No. 6 ===
Ward Office: - Pakadiya Chikani

Includes Vdc: - Pakadiya Chikani (Ward 2 & 7)

Total Area: - 4.18 (Square K.M.)

Total Population: - 3360 (2011)

Ward Contact Person Name, Post, and Contact

Ward Contact Person Name, Post, and Contact
SN	Name	Post	Contact
1	Shree Makbul Ansari	Ward Chairman	9855048796
2	Shree Rajaram Prasad Sah	Ward secretary	-
3	Shree Bhola Miya Ansari	Ward Member	9816271681
4	Shree Udanwaz Sahani Malah	Ward Member	9819242619
5	Shree Rinku Devi Mahato	Ward Female Member	9816223174

=== Ward No. 7 ===
Ward Office: - Benauli

Includes Vdc: - Benauli (Ward 1 - 9)

Total Area: - 7.62 (Square K.M.)

Total Population: - 5110 (2011)

Ward Contact Person Name, Post, and Contact

Ward Contact Person Name, Post, and Contact
SN	Name	Post	Contact
1	Shree Dinanath Sahni	Ward Chairman	9855048788
2	Shree Mahaboob Alam Mansuri	Ward secretary	9819201300
3	Shree Shisankar Raut Jaishwal	Ward Member	-
4	Shree Sukdev Mukiya Bin	Ward Member	9814292954
5	Shree Mahapati Devi Dusadin	Ward backwards Female Member	9814175311
6	Shree Chunchun Kumari	Ward Female Member	9814223105

=== Ward No. 8 ===
Ward Office: - Amarpati

Includes Vdc: - Amarpati (Ward 1 - 9)

Total Area: - 6.48 (Square K.M.)

Total Population: - 3738 (2011)

Ward Contact Person Name, Post, and Contact

Ward Contact Person Name, Post, and Contact
SN	Name	Post	Contact
1	Shree Sarwajeet Yadav	Ward Chairman	9855048789
2	Shree Ganaga Prasad Sah	Ward secretary	9845095949
3	Shree Jokhan Prasad Chaudhari	Ward Member	9807122922
4	Shree Bhola Chaudhari	Ward Member	9814283593
5	Shree Asturni Devi Hajam	Ward backwards Female Member	9809123799
6	Shree Gaytri Devi	Ward Female Member	9818476236

=== Ward No. 9 ===
Ward Office: - Kudwa

Includes Vdc: - Kudwa (Ward 1 - 9)

Total Area: - 5.07 (Square K.M.)

Total Population: - 4463 (2011)

Ward Contact Person Name, Post, and Contact

Ward Contact Person Name, Post, and Contact
SN	Name	Post	Contact
1	Shree Gauri Shankar Sah	Ward Chairman	985504879
2	Shree Thaga Prasad Vedihar	Ward secretary	9819241294
3	Shree Rama Kant Prasad Yadav	Ward Member	9865323358
4	Shree Ajay Prasad Barai	Ward Member	9857041955
5	Shree Sosila Sevi	Ward backwards Female Member	9816212873
6	Shree Baskali Ahirin	Ward Female Member	-

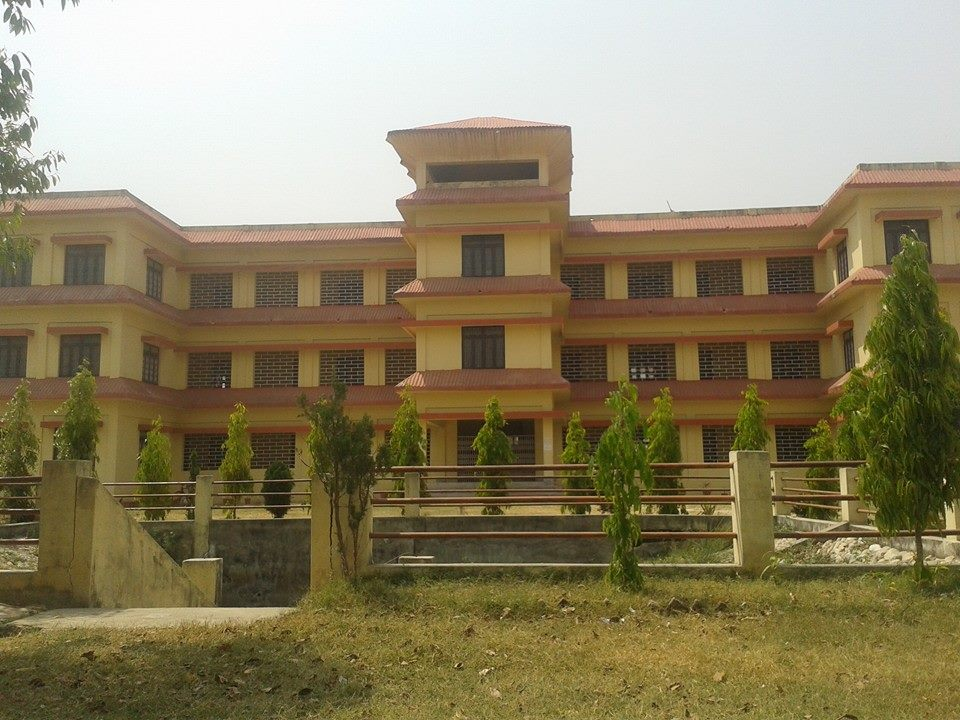
Pachrauta Ward -1 School
