= Beldari =

Beldari बेलदारी
- Ward
- Location in Nepal
- Coordinates: 26.86°N 85.04°E
- Country: Nepal
- Province: Madhesh Province
- District: Bara District

Population (2021)
  - Total: 4,374
- Time zone: UTC+5:45 (Nepal Time)

Beldari is a Village (Ward)in Bara District in the Madhesh Province of south-eastern Nepal. At the time of the 2021 Nepal census, it had a population of 4,374 persons living in 632 individual households.

== Ward No. 5 ==
Ward Office: - Beldari

Includes Vdc: - Beldari (Ward 5 & 8) and Pakadiya Chikani (Ward 1 & 8)

Total Area: - 4.38 (Square K.M.)

Total Population: - 3344 (2011)

Ward Contact Person Name, Post, and Contact

Ward Contact Person Name, Post, and Contact
SN	Name	Post	Contact
1	Shree Laxmi Yadav	Ward Chairman	9855048795
2	Shree Suresh Prasad Yadav	Ward secretary	9843533558
3	Shree Gyasudin Ansari	Ward Member	9821893325
4	Shree Dilbandhu Sah	Ward Member	9814292954
5	Shree Chandra Kali Devi Baitha	Ward backwards Female Member	9811182275
6	Shree Indu Shriwastav	Ward Female Member	9812276555
