= Suwarna Rural Municipality =

Suwarna सुवर्ण
- Rural Municipality
- Location in Nepal
- Coordinates: 27.09°N 84.94°E
- Country: Nepal
- Development Region: Central
- Zone: Narayani Zone
- District: Bara District
- Province: Madhesh Province
- Established: 2016 A.D. (2073 B.S.)

Area
  - Total: 36.84 km^{2} (14.22 sq mi)

Population (2011)
  - Total: 29,602
  - Density: 803.5/km^{2} (2,081/sq mi)
  - Religions: Hindu Muslim

Languages
  - Local: Bhojpuri, Tharu, Nepali
- Time zone: UTC+5:45 (NST)
- Postal Code: 44400
- Area code: 053
- Website: http://www.suwarnamun.gov.np/

Suwarna (Nepali: सुवर्ण ) is a rural municipality in Bara District in Province No. 2 of Nepal. It was formed in 2016 occupying current 8 sections (wards) from previous 8 former VDCs. It occupies an area of 36.84 km^{2} with a total population of 29,602.
