= Madhesi =

Madhesi, or variants, may refer to:

- Madesi tribe, an indigenous group of Native Americans
- Madheshi people, several people from Madhesh Province, Nepal

== See also ==
- Madesha, a 2008 Indian film
