= Administration in Sudurpashchim Province =

Nepalese province

Sudurpashchim Pradesh is a province of Nepal located in westernmost part of Nepal. It is surrounded by Tibet of China in Northwest, Uttrakhand of India in West, Uttar Pradesh of India in South, Karnali Province in East and North. Lumbini Province touches it in South. Godawari is the capital city of the province.

Previously, Sudurpashchim Province was a development region of Nepal with the same territory. Far-Western Development Region was official name of this region. Sudurpashchimanchal was Nepali term of Far-Western region. The 9 districts were subgrouped into two zones, Mahakali and Seti.

== Administrative structure ==
Sudurpashchim is divided into 9 districts and districts are subdivided into Municipalities.

Nepal
Sudurpashchim
Districts
Sub-Metropolitan City	Municipality	Rural Municipality
Wards

=== Districts ===
Sudurpashchim is divided into 9 districts.

#	Map	Name	Nepali	Headquarters	Population (2011)	Area	Website
1		Darchula District	दार्चुला जिल्ला	Darchula	132484	2344.61 km^{2}	
2		Bajhang District	बझाङ जिल्ला	Jayaprithvi	194701	3394.21 km^{2}	
3		Bajura District	बाजुरा जिल्ला	Badimalika	134158	2300.34 km^{2}	
4		Baitadi District	बैतडी जिल्ला	Dasharathchand	250225	1496.04 km^{2}	
5		Doti District	डोटी जिल्ला	Dipayal Silgadhi	207070	2295.71 km^{2}	
6		Achham District	अछाम जिल्ला	Mangalsen	256188	11663.86 km^{2}	
7		Dadeldhura District	डडेलधुरा जिल्ला	Amargadhi	141004	1506.09 km^{2}	
8		Kanchanpur District	कञ्चनपुर जिल्ला	Bheemdatta	448503	1222.31 km^{2}	
9		Kailali District	कैलाली जिल्ला	Dhangadhi	766659	3292.35 km^{2}	
		Sudurpashchim	सुदूरपश्चिम	Godawari	2530988	19539 km^{2}	

=== Municipality ===
There are two types of Municipality:

1. Urban Municipality (Nagarpalika)
  1. Sub-Metropolitan City
  2. Municipality
2. Rural Municipality (Gaunpalika)

==== Sub-Metropolitan City ====
There is only 1 sub-metropolitan city in Sudurpashchim

Rank	Name	Nepali	District	Population (2011)	Area	Website
1	Dhangadhi	धनगढी	Kailali District	147741	261.75	

==== Municipalities ====
There are 33 municipalities in Sudurpashchim.

Rank	Name	Nepali	District	Population (2011)	Area	Website
1	Badimalika	बडीमालिका	Bajura	16818	276	
2	Triveni	त्रिवेणी	Bajura	18363	170.32	
3	Budhiganga	बुढीगङ्गा	Bajura	21677	59.2	
4	Budhinanda	बुडीनन्दा	Bajura	18776	232.48	
5	Jayaprithvi	जयपृथ्वी	Bajhang	22191	166.79	
6	Bungal	बुङ्गल	Bajhang	33224	447.59	
7	Mangalsen	मङ्गलसेन	Accham	32331	220.14	
8	Kamalbazar	कमलबजार	Accham	23738	120.78	
9	Sanfebagar	साँफेबगर	Accham	33788	166.71	
10	Panchadewal Binayak	पञ्चदेवल	Accham	27485	147.75	
11	Dipayal Silgadhi	दिपायल सिलगढी	Doti	32941	162.62	
12	Shikhar	शिखर	Doti	31801	585.37	
13	Tikapur	टीकापुर	Kailali	76084	118.33	
14	Ghodaghodi	घोडाघोडी	Kailali	75586	354.45	
15	Lamkichuha	लम्कीचुहा	Kailali	75425	225	
16	Bhajni	भजनी	Kailali	51845	176.25	
17	Godawari	गोदावरी	Kailali	78018	308.63	
18	Gauriganga	गौरिगङ्गा	Kailali	5314	244.44	
19	Bhimdatta	भिमदत्त	Kanchanpur	104599	171.8	
20	Punarbas	पुनर्वास	Kanchanpur	53633	103.71	
21	Bedkot	बेदकोट	Kanchanpur	49479	159.92	
22	Mahakali	महाकाली	Kanchanpur	104599	171.8	
23	Shuklaphanta	शुक्लाफाँट	Kanchanpur	46834	162.57	
24	Belauri	बेलौरी	Kanchanpur	53544	123.37	
25	Krishnapur	कृष्णपुर	Kanchanpur	56643	252.75	
26	Amargadhi	अमरगढी	Dadeldhura	21245	139.33	
27	Parshuram	परशुराम	Dadeldhura	34983	414.07	
28	Dashrathchanda	दशरथचन्द	Baitadi	34575	135.15	
29	Patan	पाटन	Baitadi	30435	219.25	
30	Melauli	मेलौली	Baitadi	2545	119.43	
31	Purchaudi	पुर्चौडी	Baitadi	39174	198.52	
32	Mahakali	महाकाली	Darchula	21231	135.11	
33	Shailyashikhar	शैल्यशिखर	Darchula	22060	117.81	

=== Rural Municipality ===
There are 54 rural municipalities in Sudurpashchim Province.

#	Name	Nepali	District	Population (2011)	Area (km^{2})	Density	Website
1	Ramaroshan	रामारोशन	Achham	25,166	173.33	145	http://ramaroshanmun.gov.np/
2	Chaurpati	चौरपाटी	Achham	25,149	182.16	138	http://chaurpatimun.gov.np/
3	Turmakhand	तुर्माखाँद	Achham	24,940	232.07	107	http://turmakhadmun.gov.np/
4	Mellekh	मेल्लेख	Achham	24,670	134.78	183	http://mellekhmun.gov.np/
5	Dhakari	ढँकारी	Achham	21,562	227.88	95	http://dhakarimun.gov.np/
6	Bannigadi Jayagad	बान्नीगडीजैगड	Achham	17,359	58.26	298	http://bannigadhijaygadhmun.gov.np/
7	Dogdakedar	दोगडाकेदार	Baitadi	24,632	126.38	195	http://dogdakedarmun.gov.np/
8	Dilashaini	डिलाशैनी	Baitadi	22,924	125.28	183	http://dilasainimun.gov.np/
9	Sigas	सिगास	Baitadi	21,510	245.44	88	http://sigasmun.gov.np/
10	Pancheshwar	पञ्चेश्वर	Baitadi	18,766	120.41	156	http://pancheshwormun.gov.np/
11	Surnaya	सुर्नया	Baitadi	18,549	124.52	149	http://sunaryamun.gov.np/
12	Shivanath	शिवनाथ	Baitadi	17,115	81.65	210	http://shivanathmun.gov.np/
13	Kedarsyu	केदारस्यु	Bajhang	21,307	113.91	187	http://kedarasyumun.gov.np/
14	Thalara	थलारा	Bajhang	17,952	105.51	170	http://thalaramun.gov.np/
15	Bitthadchir	बित्थडचिर	Bajhang	17,154	86.15	199	http://bitthadchirmun.gov.np/
16	Chhabis Pathibhera	छब्बीसपाथिभेरा	Bajhang	16,296	116.34	140	http://chhabispathiveramun.gov.np/
17	Khaptadchhanna	खप्तडछान्ना	Bajhang	15,893	113.52	140	http://www.khaptadchhannamun.gov.np/
18	Masta	मष्टा	Bajhang	14,951	109.24	137	http://mastamun.gov.np/
19	Durgathali	दुर्गाथली	Bajhang	12,972	61.83	210	http://durgathalimun.gov.np/
20	Talkot	तलकोट	Bajhang	11,557	335.26	34	http://talkotmun.gov.np/
21	Surma	सुर्मा	Bajhang	9,022	270.8	33	http://surmamun.gov.np/
22	Saipal	सइपाल	Bajhang	2,182	1,467.27	2	http://kandamun.gov.np/
23	Khaptad Chhededaha	खप्तड छेडेदह	Bajura	18,575	135.08	138	http://chhededahamun.gov.np/
24	Swami Kartik Khapar	स्वामिकार्तिक खापर	Bajura	12,784	110.55	116	http://swamikartikmun.gov.np/
25	Jagannath	जगन्नाथ	Bajura	9,432	171.72	55	http://pandavgufamun.gov.np/
26	Himali	हिमाली	Bajura	9214	830.33	11	http://himalimun.gov.np/
27	Gaumul	गौमुल	Bajura	8,515	314.66	27	http://gaumulmun.gov.np/
28	Navadurga	नवदुर्गा	Dadeldhura	19,957	141.89	141	http://navadurgamun.gov.np/
29	Aalitaal	आलिताल	Dadeldhura	18,531	292.87	63	http://aalitalmun.gov.np/
30	Ganyapadhura	गन्यापधुरा	Dadeldhura	15,093	135.65	111	http://ganyapadhuramun.gov.np/
31	Bhageshwar	भागेश्वर	Dadeldhura	14,129	233.38	61	http://bhageshwormun.gov.np/
32	Ajaymeru	अजयमेरु	Dadeldhura	7,066	148.9	47	http://ajayamerumun.gov.np/
33	Naugad	नौगाड	Darchula	15,874	180.27	88	http://naugadmun.gov.np/
34	Malikarjun	मालिकार्जुन	Darchula	15,581	100.82	155	http://malikarjunmun.gov.np/
35	Marma	मार्मा	Darchula	14,956	208.06	72	http://marmamun.gov.np/
36	Lekam	लेकम	Darchula	14,838	83.98	177	http://lekammun.gov.np/
37	Duhun	दुहु	Darchula	10,818	65.35	166	http://duhunmun.gov.np/
38	Vyans	ब्याँस	Darchula	10,347	839.26	12	http://vyansmun.gov.np/
39	Apihimal	अपि हिमाल	Darchula	6,779	613.95	11	http://apihimalmun.gov.np/
40	Aadarsha	आदर्श	Doti	23,945	128.47	186	http://aadarshamun.gov.np/
41	Purbichauki	पूर्वीचौकी	Doti	22,483	117.66	191	http://purbichaukimun.gov.np/
42	K.I. Singh	केआईसिंह	Doti	20,903	127.01	165	http://kisinghmun.gov.np/
43	Jorayal	जोरायल	Doti	20,824	419.09	50	http://jorayalmun.gov.np/
44	Sayal	सायल	Doti	19,551	122.72	159	http://sayalmun.gov.np/
45	Bogatan-Phudsil	वोगटान–फुड्सिल	Doti	17,902	300.22	60	http://bogatanmun.gov.np/
46	Badikedar	बड्डी केदार	Doti	16,720	332.55	50	http://badikedarmun.gov.np/
47	Janaki	जानकी	Kailali	48,540	107.27	453	http://janakimunkailali.gov.np/
48	Kailari	कैलारी	Kailali	47,987	233.27	206	http://kailarimun.gov.np/
49	Joshipur	जोशीपुर	Kailali	36,459	65.57	556	http://joshipurmun.gov.np/
50	Bardagoriya	बर्गगोरिया	Kailali	32,683	77.26	423	http://bardgoriyamun.gov.np/
51	Mohanyal	मोहन्याल	Kailali	22,053	626.95	35	http://mohanyalmun.gov.np/
52	Chure	चुरे	Kailali	18,924	493.18	38	http://churemun.gov.np/
53	Laljhadi	लालझाँडी	Kanchanpur	22,569	154.65	146	http://laljhadimun.gov.np/
54	Beldandi	बेलडाँडी	Kanchanpur	21,949	36.7	598	http://beldandimun.gov.np/

== Judiciary ==
=== High court ===
Dipayal High Court (Nepali: दीपयाल उच्च अदालत) is the high court of Sudurpashchim. The high court established according to the new constitution of Nepal. Article 139 of the constitution says “there shall be a High Court in each state”. Article 300 (3) : The High Courts set forth in Article 139 shall be established no later than one year after the date of commencement of this Constitution. The Appellate Courts existing at the time of commencement of this Constitution shall be dissolved after the establishment of such Courts.

Government of Nepal transformed the existing appellate courts in Dipayal on 14 September 2016. As per the government decision, there will be extended bench in Mahendranagar under the high court in Dipayal.

Prakash Dhungana has been appointed as the chief judge of Dipayal High Court in Sudurpashchim.

=== District court ===
Clause 148, 149, 150 and 151 of Constitution of Nepal, 2015 defines District Courts, appointment, qualification, terms and remuneration of chief justices.

There are 9 District courts in Sudurpashchim. Each district has one District court.

Courts	Websites
Achham District	http://supremecourt.gov.np/court/achhamdc
Baitadi District	http://supremecourt.gov.np/court/baitadidc
Bajhang District	http://supremecourt.gov.np/court/bajhangdc
Bajura District	http://supremecourt.gov.np/court/bajuradc
Dadeldhura District	http://supremecourt.gov.np/court/dadeldhuradc
Darchula District	http://supremecourt.gov.np/court/darchuladc
Doti District	http://supremecourt.gov.np/court/dotidc
Kailali District	http://supremecourt.gov.np/court/kailalidc
Kanchanpur District	http://supremecourt.gov.np/court/kanchanpurdc

== Legislature ==
Pradesh Sabha of Sudurpashchim is the unicameral legislative assembly.

As per the CDC (Constituency Delimitation Commission) report, Sudurpashchim has 32 provincial assembly seats under FPTP.

Districts	Constituencies
Bajura District	2
Bajhang District	2
Achham District	4
Doti District	2
Kailali District	10
Kanchanpur District	6
Dadeldhura District	2
Baitadi District	2
Darchula District	2
