= List of chairpersons of rural municipalities in Nepal =

Nepalese political office holders

The Chairperson is the highest-ranking official in a rural municipal government in Nepal. There are in total 460 chairpersons in Nepal.

== Overview ==
Party	Province No. 1	Madhesh	Bagmati	Gandaki	Lumbini	Karnali	Sudurpaschim	Total
Nepali Congress	48	18	33	22	28	20	22	191
CPN(UML)	23	11	17	26	18	9	17	121
CPN(Maoist-centre)	12	2	23	9	21	18	11	96
CPN(Unified Socialist)	1	1	1	0	0	4	1	8
PSP-N	2	16	0	0	3	0	0	21
Loktantrik Samajbadi Party, Nepal	0	8	0	0	2	0	0	10
Rastriya Prajatantra Party	1	0	0	0	0	0	0	1
Bibeksheel Sajha Party	0	1	0	0	0	0	0	1
Terai Madhesh Loktantrik Party	0	1	0	0	0	0	0	1
Janamat Party	0	1	0	0	0	0	0	1
CLP	0	0	0	0	0	0	2	2
Rastriya Janamorcha	0	0	0	1	1	0	0	2
Independent	1	0	0	0	0	3	1	5
Total	88	59	74	58	73	54	54	460

== List of chairpersons of RM in Nepal (2022–2027) ==
=== Province No. 1 ===
1. Nepali Congress (55%)
2. CPN(UML) (26%)
3. CPN(Maoist-centre) (14%)
4. PSP-N (2%)
5. CPN(Unified Socialist) (1%)
6. RPP (1%)
7. Other (1.00%)

No.	Rural Municipality	Chairperson	Political party	District
1	Hatuwagadhi	Prem Kumar Rai	CPN (UML)	Bhojpur
2	Pauwadungma	Kiran Rai	CPN (UML)	Bhojpur
3	Ramprasad Rai	Tham Bahadur Rai	CPN (Maoist Centre)	Bhojpur
4	Aamchok	Ashok Rai	CPN (Maoist Centre)	Bhojpur
5	Tyamke Maiyum	Saroj Basnet	Nepali Congress	Bhojpur
6	Arun	Shalikram Khatri	Nepali Congress	Bhojpur
7	Salpasilichho	Daulath Kumar Kulung Rai	Independent	Bhojpur
8	Sangurigadhi	Jitendra Rai	Nepali Congress	Dhankuta
9	Chhathar Jorpati	Chatra Bahadur Subba	Nepali Congress	Dhankuta
10	Chaubise	Raj Kumar Limbu	CPN (UML)	Dhankuta
11	Sahidbhumi	Manoj Rai	CPN (UML)	Dhankuta
12	Phakphokthum	Dipendra Khanal	CPN (UML)	Ilam
13	Mai Jogmai	Kush Bahadur Thebe	CPN (UML)	Ilam
14	Mangsebung	Hemanta Rai	CPN (UML)	Ilam
15	Chulachuli	Rajendra Kerung	Nepali Congress	Ilam
16	Rong	Mani Kumar Subba	Nepali Congress	Ilam
17	Sandakpur	Tularam Gurung	Nepali Congress	Ilam
18	Kamal	Hukum Singh Rai	Nepali Congress	Jhapa
19	Buddha Shanti	Manoj Prasai	Nepali Congress	Jhapa
20	Kachankawal	Kalendra Prasad Singh Rajbanshi	Nepali Congress	Jhapa
21	Jhapa	Jaya Narayan Shah	Nepali Congress	Jhapa
22	Gaurigunj	Fulwati Rajbanshi	Nepali Congress	Jhapa
23	Barhadashi	Devindra Prasad Chamlagain	CPN (UML)	Jhapa
24	Haldibari	Rabindra Prasad Lingden	RPP	Jhapa
25	Khotehang	Udim Bahadur Rai	CPN (Maoist Centre)	Khotang
26	Jantedhunga	Aruna Devi Rai	CPN (Maoist Centre)	Khotang
27	Aiselukharka	Girendra Bahadur Rai	CPN (UML)	Khotang
28	Diprung	Lokendra Rai	CPN (UML)	Khotang
29	Kepilasgadhi	Samir Rai	Nepali Congress	Khotang
30	Barahpokhari	Shalik Ram Banjara	Nepali Congress	Khotang
31	Rawabesi	Fatik Kumar Shrestha	Nepali Congress	Khotang
32	Sakela	Ravi Prakash Rai	Nepali Congress	Khotang
33	Jahada	Jitendra Prasad Sah	Nepali Congress	Morang
34	Budi Ganga	Jit Narayan Thapa Magar	Nepali Congress	Morang
35	Katahari	Devraj Chaudhary	Nepali Congress	Morang
36	Dhanpalthan	Jiwacha Prasad Gachhadhar	Nepali Congress	Morang
37	Gramthan	Jay Prakash Gachhadhar Tharu	Nepali Congress	Morang
38	Miklajung	Babi Kumar Rai	Nepali Congress	Morang
39	Kerabari	Suman Miringching	CPN (UML)	Morang
40	Kanepokhari	Rajmati Ingnaam	CPN (UML)	Morang
41	Manebhanjyang	Gyanendra Rumdali	Nepali Congress	Okhaldhunga
42	Champadevi	Nawaraj KC	Nepali Congress	Okhaldhunga
43	Sunkoshi	Kamal Tamang	Nepali Congress	Okhaldhunga
44	Likhu	Ashok Kumar Karki	Nepali Congress	Okhaldhunga
45	Molung	Uttam Rai	CPN (UML)	Okhaldhunga
46	Chisankhugadhi	Nishanta Sharma Bastola	CPN (Maoist Centre)	Okhaldhunga
47	Khiji Demba	Gambu Sherpa	PSP-N	Okhaldhunga
48	Miklajung	Amar Raj Makhim	CPN (Maoist Centre)	Panchthar
49	Phalgunanda	Brij Hang Angdembe	Nepali Congress	Panchthar
50	Hilihang	Samar Bahadur Adhikari	Nepali Congress	Panchthar
51	Phalelung	Bir Bikram Thamsuhang	Nepali Congress	Panchthar
52	Kummayak	Bam Prasad Lawati	Nepali Congress	Panchthar
53	Tumbewa	Babu Ram Khadka	Nepali Congress	Panchthar
54	Yangwarak	Bhim Bahadur Yongya	CPN (UML)	Panchthar
55	Makalu	Ongdi Tsering Sherpa	Nepali Congress	Sankhuwasabha
56	Silichong	Bhupal Raj Rai	Nepali Congress	Sankhuwasabha
57	Sabhapokhari	Bhim Bahadur Limbu	Nepali Congress	Sankhuwasabha
58	Chichila	Pasang Nurbu Sherpa	Nepali Congress	Sankhuwasabha
59	Bhot Khola	Wang Chhedar Lama	CPN (UML)	Sankhuwasabha
60	Thulung Dudhkoshi	Ashim Rai	CPN (Maoist Centre)	Solukhumbu
61	Necha Salyan	Dhan Jan Rai	Nepali Congress	Solukhumbu
62	Maha Kulung	Surya Bahadur Rai	Nepali Congress	Solukhumbu
63	Sotang	Khilraj Basnet	Nepali Congress	Solukhumbu
64	Likhu Pike	Mina Devi Karki	Nepali Congress	Solukhumbu
65	Dudhkoshi	Buddhi Kiran Rai	CPN (UML)	Solukhumbu
66	Khumbu Pasang Lhamu	Mingma Chiri Sherpa	CPN (UML)	Solukhumbu
67	Koshi	Aiyuv Ansari	Nepali Congress	Sunsari
68	Harinagara	Gafar Ansari Miya	Nepali Congress	Sunsari
69	Bhokraha	Ajmal Akhtar Miya	Nepali Congress	Sunsari
70	Dewanganj	Bechan Prasad Mehta	PSP-N	Sunsari
71	Gadhi	Aash Narayan Chaudhari	CPN (UML)	Sunsari
72	Barju	Jiwachha Kumar Raya	CPN (UML)	Sunsari
73	Sirijangha	Lal Krishna Chauhan	Nepali Congress	Taplejung
74	Meringden	Yuk Ha Bir Hangam	Nepali Congress	Taplejung
75	Mikwa Khola	Bhakta Bahadur Karki	Nepali Congress	Taplejung
76	Aathrai Triveni	Dipendra Pemu	CPN (UML)	Taplejung
77	Pathibhara Yangwarak	Keshar Kumar Subba	CPN (UML)	Taplejung
78	Sidingwa	Maan Bahadur Rai	CPN (UML)	Taplejung
79	Phaktanglung	Razan Limbu	CPN (Maoist Centre)	Taplejung
80	Maiwa Khola	Bijay Prakash Wanem	CPN (Maoist Centre)	Taplejung
81	Aathrai	Dil Kumar Pahim	Nepali Congress	Terhathum
82	Phedap	Keshav Prasad Bhetwal	Nepali Congress	Terhathum
83	Chhathar	Santa Bir Limbu	CPN (UML)	Terhathum
84	Menchayayem	Yadav Bahadur Khapung	CPN (UML)	Terhathum
85	Udayapurgadhi	Man Bahadur Kepchaki Magar	CPN (Unified Socialist)	Udayapur
86	Rautamai	Birendra Kumar Magar	CPN (Maoist Centre)	Udayapur
87	Tapli	Dhunga Raj Biswakarma	CPN (Maoist Centre)	Udayapur
88	Limchungbung	Mejar Kumar Rai	CPN (Maoist Centre)	Udayapur

=== Madhesh Province ===
1. Nepali Congress (31%)
2. PSP-N (27%)
3. CPN(UML) (15%)
4. LSP-N (13%)
5. CPN (Maoist Centre) (4%)
6. 0.00%
7. Other (10.0%)

SN	Rural Municipality	Chairperson	Political party	District
1	Suwarna	Rajesh Prasad Yadav	Nepali Congress	Bara
2	Adarsha Kotwal	Jawahar Prasad	Nepali Congress	Bara
3	Pheta	Rustam Ansari	Bibeksheel Sajha Party	Bara
4	Baragadhi	Ashok Kumar Jayasbal	PSP-N	Bara
5	Karaiyamai	Sambhu Prasad Yadav	PSP-N	Bara
6	Bishrampur	Julfikar Ali Bhutto	LSP-N	Bara
7	Devtal	Uday Prasad Yadav	LSP-N	Bara
8	Prasauni	Binod Prasad Jayasbal	CPN (UML)	Bara
9	Parwanipur	Ram Chatri Prasad Kurmi	CPN (UML)	Bara
10	Mukhiyapatti Musharniya	Jay Kumar Yadav	PSP-N	Dhanusha
11	Janaknandini	Dipindev Yadav	PSP-N	Dhanusha
12	Aurahi	Umashankar Prasad Sah	CPN (UML)	Dhanusha
13	Bateshwar	Ram Ashish Mahato	Nepali Congress	Dhanusha
14	Lakshminya	Bhogendra Mishra	Nepali Congress	Dhanusha
15	Dhanauji	Ram Kumar Sah	Nepali Congress	Dhanusha
16	Sonama	Bisheshwar Prasad Yadav	LSP-N	Mahottari
17	Pipra	Ramjanki Yadav	PSP-N	Mahottari
18	Samsi	Ramnath Yadav	PSP-N	Mahottari
19	Ekdara	Dipnarayan Mandal	PSP-N	Mahottari
20	Mahottari	Dilip Kumar Pandeya	TMLP	Mahottari
21	Sakhuwa Prasauni	Jaswant Yadav	CPN (UML)	Parsa
22	Chhipahrmai	Manoj Kumar	CPN (UML)	Parsa
23	Thori	Lalbahadur Shrestha	CPN (UML)	Parsa
24	Bindabasini	Pramod Tiwari	LSP-N	Parsa
25	Jagarnathpur	Shreekant Yadav	Nepali Congress	Parsa
26	Paterwa Sugauli	Dinesh Kumar Chaudhary	Nepali Congress	Parsa
27	Jirabhawani	Anoj Chaudhary	Nepali Congress	Parsa
28	Pakaha Mainpur	Suresh Prasad	Nepali Congress	Parsa
29	Kalikamai	Basista Kumar	PSP-N	Parsa
30	Dhobini	Madan Prasad Chauhan	PSP-N	Parsa
31	Durga Bhagawati	Sambhu Kumar Singh	CPN (MC)	Rautahat
32	Yamunamai	Mohammad Saud	LSP-N	Rautahat
33	Tilathi Koiladi	Arun Kumar Mandal	Nepali Congress	Saptari
34	Tirhut	Bijay Kumar Yadav	Nepali Congress	Saptari
35	Rajgadh	Om Prakash Mandal	CPN (UML)	Saptari
36	Chhinnamasta	Bidyanand Chaudhary	LSP-N	Saptari
37	Mahadeva	Sunil Kumar Mandal	LSP-N	Saptari
38	Rupani	Dinesh Kumar Yadav	LSP-N	Saptari
39	Agnisaira Krishnasavaran	Dinanath Chaudhary	CPN (UML)	Saptari
40	Balan-Bihul	Khem Chandra Yadav	Janamat Party	Saptari
41	Bishnupur	Umesh Prasad Yadav	PSP-N	Saptari
42	Ramnagar	Rajababu Yadav	CPN (MC)	Sarlahi
43	Chakraghatta	Krishna Kumar Yadav	PSP-N	Sarlahi
44	Chandranagar	Rajkumar Mahto	Nepali Congress	Sarlahi
45	Brahampuri	Ram Padarath Sah Teli	Nepali Congress	Sarlahi
46	Kaudena	Rupesh Kumar	Nepali Congress	Sarlahi
47	Dhankaul	Ram Asray Sah	Nepali Congress	Sarlahi
48	Bishnu	Jawaharlal Yadav	Nepali Congress	Sarlahi
49	Parsa	Dhirendra Raya	Nepali Congress	Sarlahi
50	Basbariya	Ram Singhasan Yadav	PSP-N	Sarlahi
51	Laksmipur Patari	Chauranand Thakur	Nepali Congress	Siraha
52	Bariyarpatti	Santosh Kumar Mahato	PSP-N	Siraha
53	Aurahi	Shivji Yadav	PSP-N	Siraha
54	Arnama	Ashok Kumar Yadav	PSP-N	Siraha
55	Navarajpur	Shiv Udgar Yadav	PSP-N	Siraha
56	Bhagwanpur	Ugranarayan Uadav	CPN (UML)	Siraha
57	Naraha	Ram Pramod Yadav	CPN (UML)	Siraha
58	Bishnupur	Satyanarayan Yadav	CPN (UML)	Siraha
59	Sakhuwanankarkatti	Kedar Nath Yadav	CPN (Unified Socialist)	Siraha

=== Bagmati Province ===
1. Nepali Congress (45%)
2. CPN(UML) (23%)
3. CPN(Maoist-centre) (31%)
4. CPN(Unified Socialist) (1%)

SN	Rural Municipality	Chairperson	Political party	District
1	Ichchhakamana	Dan Bahadur Gurung	CPN (UML)	Chitwan
2	Thakre	Ram Kumar Acharya	CPN (UML)	Dhading
3	Benighat Rorang	Krishna Bahadur Thapaloya	CPN (Maoist Centre)	Dhading
4	Galchhi	Kedarnath Khatiwada	CPN (UML)	Dhading
5	Gajuri	Ganesh Lal Shreshtha	CPN (Maoist Centre)	Dhading
6	Jwalamukhi	Yam Nath Danai	Nepali Congress	Dhading
7	Siddhalekh	Parshu Ram Khatiwada	Nepali Congress	Dhading
8	Tripurasundari	Raju Upreti	Nepali Congress	Dhading
9	Gangajamuna	Bhakta Bahadur Lama	Nepali Congress	Dhading
10	Netrawati Dabjong	Magh Nath Rijal	Nepali Congress	Dhading
11	Khaniyabas	Ran Bahadur Tamang	Nepali Congress	Dhading
12	Rubi Valley	Ram Singh Tamang	CPN (Maoist Centre)	Dhading
13	Kalinchok	Arjun Prasad Shivakoti	Nepali Congress	Dolakha
14	Melung	Hira Kumar Tamang	CPN (UML)	Dolakha
15	Shailung	Rimal Babu Shreshtha	CPN (Maoist Centre)	Dolakha
16	Baiteshwar	Chhabi Lama	Nepali Congress	Dolakha
17	Tamakoshi	Pron Pratap KC	CPN (Unified Socialist)	Dolakha
18	Bigu	Sanjiv Wali	CPN (Maoist Centre)	Dolakha
19	Gaurishankar	Bishwash Karki	CPN (Maoist Centre)	Dolakha
20	Roshi	Dinesh Lama	Nepali Congress	Kavrepalanchok
21	Temal	Chandra Bahadur Tamang	Nepali Congress	Kavrepalanchok
22	Chaunri Deurali	Renuka Chaulagain	CPN (Maoist Centre)	Kavrepalanchok
23	Bhumlu	Prem Bahadur Bhujel	CPN (Maoist Centre)	Kavrepalanchok
24	Mahabharat	Kancha Lal Jimba	CPN (Maoist Centre)	Kavrepalanchok
25	Bethanchok	Bhagwan Adhikari	Nepali Congress	Kavrepalanchok
26	Khanikhola	Indra Bahadur Thing	CPN (Maoist Centre)	Kavrepalanchok
27	Bagmati	Bir Bahadur Lopchan	Nepali Congress	Lalitpur
28	Konjyosom	Krishna Man Lama	CPN (UML)	Lalitpur
29	Mahankal	Ganesh KC	Nepali Congress	Lalitpur
30	Bakaiya	Dharmaraj Lamichane	Nepali Congress	Makwanpur
31	Manahari	Ranjan Kalakheti	Nepali Congress	Makwanpur
32	Bagmati	Sarkesh Ghalan	CPN (Maoist Centre)	Makwanpur
33	Raksirang	Raj Kumar Malla	Nepali Congress	Makwanpur
34	Makawanpurgadhi	Dorje Lama Syangtan	Nepali Congress	Makwanpur
35	Kailash	Lok Bahadur Moktan	Nepali Congress	Makwanpur
36	Bhimphedi	Haidam Lama	CPN (UML)	Makwanpur
37	Indrasarowar	Dev Krishna Pudasaini Sharma	CPN (UML)	Makwanpur
38	Kakani	Suman Tamang	CPN (Maoist Centre)	Nuwakot
39	Dupcheshwar	Shankar Bahadur Thapa	CPN (Maoist Centre)	Nuwakot
40	Shivapuri	Govinda Prasad Thapaloya	CPN (Maoist Centre)	Nuwakot
41	Tadi	Santa Man Tamang	Nepali Congress	Nuwakot
42	Likhu	Dhruba Shreshtha	Nepali Congress	Nuwakot
43	Suryagadhi	Santa Bahadur Tamang	Nepali Congress	Nuwakot
44	Panchakanya	Tej Bahadur Tamang	CPN (Maoist Centre)	Nuwakot
45	Tarkeshwar	Shiva Adhikari	Nepali Congress	Nuwakot
46	Kispang	Bir Bal Tamang	CPN (UML)	Nuwakot
47	Myagang	Asha Tamang	Nepali Congress	Nuwakot
48	Khandadevi	Gyan Kumar Shrestha	CPN (UML)	Ramechhap
49	Likhu Tamakoshi	Keshav Mahat	Nepali Congress	Ramechhap
50	Doramba	Main Kumar Moktan	CPN (Maoist Centre)	Ramechhap
51	Gokulganga	Kaji Bahadur Khadka	Nepali Congress	Ramechhap
52	Sunapati	Thulo Kancha Tamang	CPN (Maoist Centre)	Ramechhap
53	Umakunda	Sher Bahadur Sunuwar	CPN (UML)	Ramechhap
54	Naukunda	Nurbu Shyanbo Ghale	Nepali Congress	Rasuwa
55	Kalika	Hari Krishna Devkota	Nepali Congress	Rasuwa
56	Uttargaya	Madhav Prasad Aryal	CPN (UML)	Rasuwa
57	Gosaikund	Kaisang Nurpur Tamang	CPN (UML)	Rasuwa
58	Aamachodingmo	Buchung Tamang	Nepali Congress	Rasuwa
59	Tinpatan	Karna Bahadur Magar	Nepali Congress	Sindhuli
60	Marin	Bhimarsha Muktan	CPN (Maoist Centre)	Sindhuli
61	Hariharpurgadhi	Braj Dhwaj Waiwa	CPN (Maoist Centre)	Sindhuli
62	Sunkoshi	Dipa Bohora Dahal	CPN (Maoist Centre)	Sindhuli
63	Golanjor	Shankar Raj Baral	CPN (UML)	Sindhuli
64	Phikkal	Parbati Sunuwar	CPN (UML)	Sindhuli
65	Ghyanglekh	Jagat Bahadur Bholan	Nepali Congress	Sindhuli
66	Indrawati	Jhamka Nath Nepal	CPN (UML)	Sindhupalchok
67	Panchpokhari Thangpal	Tasi Lama	CPN (UML)	Sindhupalchok
68	Jugal	Rsham Syangbo	CPN (Maoist Centre)	Sindhupalchok
69	Balephi	Ganga Bahadur Tamang	CPN (Maoist Centre)	Sindhupalchok
70	Helambu	Nima Gyaljen Sherpa	Nepali Congress	Sindhupalchok
71	Bhotekoshi	Pasang Nurp Sherpa	Nepali Congress	Sindhupalchok
72	Sunkoshi	Tapindra Prasad Timalsina	CPN (UML)	Sindhupalchok
73	Lisankhu Pakhar	Raju Lama (Tamang)	CPN (Maoist Centre)	Sindhupalchok
74	Tripurasundari	Bhakta Dhwaj Bohara	Nepali Congress	Sindhupalchok

=== Gandaki Province ===
1. Nepali Congress (38%)
2. CPN(UML) (45%)
3. CPN(Maoist-centre) (16%)
4. RJP (1%)

SN	Rural Municipality	Chairperson	Political party	District
1	Badigad	Gandaki Thapa Adhikari	Nepali Congress	Baglung
2	Kathekhola	Raju Thapa	Nepali Congress	Baglung
3	Nisikhola	Surya Bahadur Gharti	Nepali Congress	Baglung
4	Bareng	Krishna Prasad Sharma	RJP	Baglung
5	Tarakhola	Dhan Bahadur Bika	CPN (Maoist Centre)	Baglung
6	Tamankhola	Joklal Budha	Nepali Congress	Baglung
7	Shahid Lakhan	Ramesh Babu Thapa Magar	CPN (Maoist Centre)	Gorkha
8	Barpak Sulikot	Bishnu Prasad Bhatta	CPN (Maoist Centre)	Gorkha
9	Aarughat	Raju Gurung	Nepali Congress	Gorkha
10	Siranchowk	Gyanendra Gurung	Nepali Congress	Gorkha
11	Gandaki	Dipak Timilsena	CPN (Maoist Centre)	Gorkha
12	Bhimsen Thapa	Lok Prasad Banjara	CPN (Maoist Centre)	Gorkha
13	Ajirkot	Dipak Devkota	CPN (Maoist Centre)	Gorkha
14	Dharche	Laxman Gurung	CPN (Maoist Centre)	Gorkha
15	Tsum Nubri	Nima Lama	CPN (Maoist Centre)	Gorkha
16	Annapurna	Bishnu Bahadur KC	CPN (UML)	Kaski
17	Machhapuchhre	Min Bahadur Gurung	Nepali Congress	Kaski
18	Madi	Devi Jung Gurung	Nepali Congress	Kaski
19	Rupa	Navroj Ojha	CPN (UML)	Kaski
20	Marsyangdi	Arjun Gurung	CPN (UML)	Lamjung
21	Dordi	Yuvraj Adhikari	CPN (UML)	Lamjung
22	Dudhpokhari	Dhan Prasad Gurung	Nepali Congress	Lamjung
23	Kwaholasothar	Surya Prasad Gurung	CPN (UML)	Lamjung
24	Manang Disyang	Kancha Ghale	CPN (UML)	Manang
25	Nason	Dhan Bahadur Gurung	Nepali Congress	Manang
26	Chame	Lokendra Bahadur Ghale	CPN (UML)	Manang
27	Narpa Bhumi	Konjo Tenjing Lama	Nepali Congress	Manang
28	Gharapjhong	Mohan Singh Lalchan	Nepali Congress	Mustang
29	Thasang	Pradip Gauchan	CPN (UML)	Mustang
30	Baragung Muktichhetra	Angjen Gurung	Nepali Congress	Mustang
31	Lomanthang	Tasi Nhurbu Gurung	CPN (UML)	Mustang
32	Lo-Ghekar Damodarkunda	Lopsang Chhompel Bista	CPN (UML)	Mustang
33	Malika	Beg Prasad Garbuja	CPN (UML)	Myagdi
34	Mangala	Sat Prasad Roka	CPN (UML)	Myagdi
35	Raghuganga	Bhawa Bahadur Bhandari	Nepali Congress	Myagdi
36	Dhaulagiri	Prem Prasad Pun	Nepali Congress	Myagdi
37	Annapurna	Bharat Kumar Pun	CPN (UML)	Myagdi
38	Hupsekot	Laxmi Devi Pandey	Nepali Congress	Nawalpur
39	Binayi Triveni	Ghanshyam Giri	CPN (UML)	Nawalpur
40	Bulingtar	Dipendra Sunari	CPN (UML)	Nawalpur
41	Baudikali	Prakash Ojha	CPN (UML)	Nawalpur
42	Jaljala	Raju Prasad Acharya	Nepali Congress	Parbat
43	Modi	Hira Devi Sharma	CPN (UML)	Parbat
44	Paiyun	Toran Malla Thakuri	Nepali Congress	Parbat
45	Bihadi	Parwin Gurung	Nepali Congress	Parbat
46	Mahashila	Ishwari Prasad Bhusal	CPN (UML)	Parbat
47	Kaligandaki	Khim Bahadur Thapa	CPN (UML)	Syangja
48	Biruwa	Surya Bahadur Kunwar	CPN (UML)	Syangja
49	Harinas	Khim Narayan Manandhar	CPN (UML)	Syangja
50	Aandhikhola	Bishwa Nath Paudel	CPN (UML)	Syangja
51	Arjun Chaupari	Prakash Tiwari	Nepali Congress	Syangja
52	Phedikhola	Ghanshyam Subedi	CPN (UML)	Syangja
53	Rishing	Rajendra Krishna Shrestha	Nepali Congress	Tanahun
54	Myagde	Shree Prasad Shrestha	CPN (UML)	Tanahun
55	Aanbu Khaireni	Shukra Chuman	CPN (Maoist Centre)	Tanahun
56	Bandipur	Surendra Bahadur Thapa	CPN (UML)	Tanahun
57	Ghiring	Hom Bahadur Thapa	CPN (UML)	Tanahun
58	Devghat	Til Bahadur Thapa	Nepali Congress	Tanahun

=== Lumbini Province ===
1. Nepali Congress (38%)
2. CPN(UML) (25%)
3. CPN(Maoist-centre) (29%)
4. RJP (1%)
5. PSP-N (4%)
6. LSP-N (3%)

SN	Rural Municipality	Chairperson	Political party	District
1	Malarani	Dal Bahadur Bhattrai	CPN (UML)	Arghakhanchi
2	Panini	Tek Raj Neupane	CPN (UML)	Arghakhanchi
3	Chhatradev	Chandraman Shrestha	Nepali Congress	Arghakhanchi
4	Raptisonari	Tapta Bahadur Paudel	Nepali Congress	Banke
5	Baijanath	Prakash Bahadur Shahi	Nepali Congress	Banke
6	Khajura	Dambar Bahadur BK	CPN (Maoist Centre)	Banke
7	Janaki	Chabban Khan	Nepali Congress	Banke
8	Duduwa	Narendra Kumar Chaudhary	Nepali Congress	Banke
9	Narainapur	Ishtiyaq Ahmed Shah	PSP-N	Banke
10	Badhaiyatal	Himalaya Tripathi	CPN (Maoist Centre)	Bardiya
11	Geruwa	Jaman Singh KC	Nepali Congress	Bardiya
12	Rapti	Prakash Bista	CPN (Maoist Centre)	Dang
13	Gadhawa	Yam Narayan Sharma Pokhrel	CPN (Maoist Centre)	Dang
14	Babai	Kul Bahadur KC	Nepali Congress	Dang
15	Shantinagar	Pramod Basnet	Nepali Congress	Dang
16	Rajpur	Sharad Kumar Budhathoki	Nepali Congress	Dang
17	Banglachuli	Tulsi Ram Pun Magar	CPN (Maoist Centre)	Dang
18	Dangisharan	Shambhu Giri	Nepali Congress	Dang
19	Satyawati	Tika Ram Paudel	CPN (UML)	Gulmi
20	Dhurkot	Bhupal Pokhrel	CPN (Maoist Centre)	Gulmi
21	Gulmi Darbar	Saroj Kumar Thapa	Nepali Congress	Gulmi
22	Madane	Mahendra Bahadur Kunwar	Nepali Congress	Gulmi
23	Chandrakot	Ram Prasad Panday	CPN (UML)	Gulmi
24	Malika	Devi Ram Aryal	CPN (Maoist Centre)	Gulmi
25	Chhatrakot	Yubraj Khatri Chetri	CPN (Maoist Centre)	Gulmi
26	Isma	Bharat Singh Khadka	Nepali Congress	Gulmi
27	Kaligandaki	Bed Bahadur Thapa	Nepali Congress	Gulmi
28	Ruru	Yadu Gyawali	CPN (Maoist Centre)	Gulmi
29	Mayadevi	Baliuddin Musalman	Nepali Congress	Kapilvastu
30	Suddhodhan	Kamlesh Sharan Chaudhary	LSP-N	Kapilvastu
31	Yasodhara	Shiva Dayak Tiwari	CPN (UML)	Kapilvastu
32	Bijaynagar	Gopal Bahadur Thapa	CPN (UML)	Kapilvastu
33	Susta	Tek Narayan Upadhyay	Nepali Congress	Parasi
34	Pratappur	Umesh Chabdra Yadav	Nepali Congress	Parasi
35	Sarawal	Sukhadi Prasad Chaudhari Tharu	CPN (UML)	Parasi
36	Palhinandan	Vaiju Prasad Gupta	CPN (Maoist Centre)	Parasi
37	Rainadevi Chhahara	Rukmangad Bhattarai	Nepali Congress	Palpa
38	Mathagadhi	Yam Bahadur Chidi	CPN (UML)	Palpa
39	Nisdi	Mukta Bahadur Saru	CPN (UML)	Palpa
40	Bagnaskali	Saraswati Darlami	CPN (UML)	Palpa
41	Rambha	Bishnu Prasad Bhandari	CPN (UML)	Palpa
42	Purbakhola	Nun Bahadur Thapa	CPN (UML)	Palpa
43	Tinau	Prem Shreshtha	CPN (UML)	Palpa
44	Ribdikot	Narayan Bahadur Karki	CPN (Maoist Centre)	Palpa
45	Naubahini	Dil Bahadur Thapa	CPN (UML)	Pyuthan
46	Jhimruk	Pit Bahadur Mahatar Kshetri	CPN (Maoist Centre)	Pyuthan
47	Gaumukhi	Bishnu Kumar Giri	Nepali Congress	Pyuthan
48	Airawati	Nawil Bikram Shah	Nepali Congress	Pyuthan
49	Sarumarani	Jhang Bahadur Bishwokarma	CPN (UML)	Pyuthan
50	Mallarani	Krishna Bahadur Khadka	RJP	Pyuthan
51	Mandavi	Navraj Adhikari	CPN (Maoist Centre)	Pyuthan
52	Runtigadhi	Janak Pun	Nepali Congress	Rolpa
53	Lungri	Janak Khadka	Nepali Congress	Rolpa
54	Gangadev	Hari Bahadur Pun	Nepali Congress	Rolpa
55	Sunilsmriti	Mani Ram Budhathoki	CPN (Maoist Centre)	Rolpa
56	Paribartan	Suk Bahadur Budha Magar	CPN (Maoist Centre)	Rolpa
57	Triveni	Karna Bahadur Batha Magar	CPN (UML)	Rolpa
58	Madi	Amar Singh Gharti Magar	CPN (Maoist Centre)	Rolpa
59	Sunchhahari	Dhan Bahadur Pun Magar	CPN (Maoist Centre)	Rolpa
60	Thabang	Rishi Keshav Budha Magar	CPN (Maoist Centre)	Rolpa
61	Bhume	Hom Prakash Shrestha	CPN (Maoist Centre)	Eastern Rukum
62	Putha Uttarganga	Puni Raj Gharti	CPN (Maoist Centre)	Eastern Rukum
63	Sisne	Krishna Regmi	CPN (Maoist Centre)	Eastern Rukum
64	Gaidhawa	Surendra Paudel	CPN (UML)	Rupandehi
65	Mayadevi	Dhurba Narayan Chaudhari	Nepali Congress	Rupandehi
66	Kotahimai	Balkrishna Tripathi	LSP-N	Rupandehi
67	Marchawarimai	Gaya Prasad Barai	PSP-N	Rupandehi
68	Siyari	Thaneshwar Ghimire	Nepali Congress	Rupandehi
69	Sammarimai	Vinod Kumar Srivastav	Nepali Congress	Rupandehi
70	Rohini	Bidhya Prasad Yadav	PSP-N	Rupandehi
71	Shuddhodhan	Vishnu Prasad Basyal	Nepali Congress	Rupandehi
72	Omsatiya	Manjit Kumar Yadav	CPN (UML)	Rupandehi
73	Kanchan	Navraj Dhakal	Nepali Congress	Rupandehi

=== Karnali Province ===
1. Nepali Congress (37%)
2. CPN (Unified Socialist) (7%)
3. CPN(UML) (17%)
4. CPN (Maoist Centre) (33%)
5. Other (6.00%)

SN	Rural Municipality	Chairperson	Political party	District
1	Bhairabi	Rita Kumari Shahi	Nepali Congress	Dailekh
2	Mahabu	Lachuman Gurung	Nepali Congress	Dailekh
3	Thantikandh	Raksh Bahadur Sah	Nepali Congress	Dailekh
4	Naumule	Chhabiram Subedi	CPN (Maoist Centre)	Dailekh
5	Bhagawatimai	Ganesh Bahadur Thapa	CPN (Maoist Centre)	Dailekh
6	Dungeshwar	Sundar Kumar KC	CPN (UML)	Dailekh
7	Gurans	Top Bahadur BC	CPN (UML)	Dailekh
8	Kaike	Angad Kumar Rana	CPN (Unified Socialist)	Dolpa
9	Chharka Tangsong	Senang Gurung	CPN (Unified Socialist)	Dolpa
10	Mudkechula	Datt Bahadur Shahi	CPN (Maoist Centre)	Dolpa
12	Jagadulla	Nar Singh Rokaya	CPN (Maoist Centre)	Dolpa
11	She Phoksundo	Dhawa Samduk Gurung	CPN (UML)	Dolpa
13	Dolpo Buddha	Karma Choiwel Gurung	Independent	Dolpa
14	Sarkegad	Than Bahadur Rokaya	Nepali Congress	Humla
15	Adanchuli	Mohan Bikram Singh	Nepali Congress	Humla
16	Kharpunath	Karna Bahadur Rawal	Nepali Congress	Humla
17	Simkot	Bijay Bhandari	CPN (Maoist Centre)	Humla
18	Tanjakot	Lalkesh Jaisi	CPN (Maoist Centre)	Humla
19	Namkha	Prem Bahadur Lama	CPN (Maoist Centre)	Humla
20	Chankheli	Pyarilal Shahi	independent	Humla
21	Junichande	Bed Bahadur shahi	CPN (UML)	Jajarkot
22	Barekot	Bir Bahadur Giri	CPN (UML)	Jajarkot
23	Kushe	Hari Chandra Basnet	Nepali Congress	Jajarkot
24	Shivalaya	Sher Bahadur Shahi	Nepali Congress	Jajarkot
25	Sinja	Purna Prasad Dhital	CPN (Maoist Centre)	Jumla
26	Tila	Moti Lal Rokaya	CPN (Maoist Centre)	Jumla
27	Tatopani	Nanda Prasad Chaulagain	Nepali Congress	Jumla
28	Patarasi	Purna Singe Bohara	Nepali Congress	Jumla
29	Kankasundari	Damodar Prasad Acharya	Nepali Congress	Jumla
30	Hima	Laxman Bahadur Shahi	Nepali Congress	Jumla
31	Guthichaur	Dan Bahadur Buda	Nepali Congress	Jumla
32	Narharinath	Nagendra Bahadur Bista	Nepali Congress	Kalikot
33	Sanni Triveni	Mohan Bahadur KC	Independent	Kalikot
34	Palata	Bishnu Bahadur Rokaya	CPN (Maoist Centre)	Kalikot
35	Shubha Kalika	Govinda Prasad Acharya	CPN (Maoist Centre)	Kalikot
36	Pachaljharana	Dev Raj Shahi	CPN (Maoist Centre)	Kalikot
37	Mahawai	Khem Bahadur Sing	CPN (Maoist Centre)	Kalikot
38	Khatyad	Aja Bahadur Shahi	CPN (Maoist Centre)	Mugu
39	Soru	Dharma Bahadur Shahi	CPN (Unified Socialist)	Mugu
40	Mugum Karmarong	Kshiring Kyanpe Lama	Nepali Congress	Mugu
41	Sani Bheri	Birkha Bahadur Bista	CPN (Maoist Centre)	Western Rukum
42	Tribeni	Ganesh Kumar KC	CPN (Maoist Centre)	Western Rukum
43	Banphikot	Janak Kumar Bantha Magar	Nepali Congress	Western Rukum
44	Kumakh	Man Bahadur Budhathoki	Nepali Congress	Salyan
45	Tribeni	Khim Bahadur Rawat	Nepali Congress	Salyan
46	Siddha Kumakh	Bharat Giri	Nepali Congress	Salyan
47	Kapurkot	Durga Bahadur Pun	CPN (Unified Socialist)	Salyan
48	Kalimati	Dan Bahadur Khatri KC	CPN (UML)	Salyan
49	Chhatreshwari	Oj Bahadur Budhathoki	CPN (UML)	Salyan
50	Darma	Nim Bahadur KC	CPN (Maoist Centre)	Salyan
51	Barahatal	Bhim Bahadur Bhandari	Nepali Congress	Surkhet
52	Simta	Ain Bahadur Chand	CPN (UML)	Surkhet
53	Chingad	Bodh Bikram GC	CPN (UML)	Surkhet
54	Chaukune to	Khadka BK	CPN (Maoist Centre)	

=== Sudurpashchim Province ===
1. Nepali Congress (41%)
2. CPN(UML) (31%)
3. CPN (Maoist Centre) (20%)
4. CLP (4%)
5. CPN (Unified Socialist) (2%)
6. 0.00%
7. Other (2.00%)

SN	Rural Municipality	Chairperson	Political party	District
1	Ramaroshan	Man Bahadur Saud	Nepali Congress	Achham
2	Chaurpati	Bhim Bahadur Saud	Nepali Congress	Achham
3	Dhankari	Prakash Bahadur Saud	Nepali Congress	Achham
4	Bannigadi Jayagad	Tek Bahadur Saud	Nepali Congress	Achham
5	Turmakhand	Dambar Bahadur BC	CPN (UML)	Achham
6	Mellekh	Jwala Singh Saud	CPN (Maoist Centre)	Achham
7	Dilashaini	Santosh Prakash Joshi	Independent	Baitadi
8	Dogdakedar	Chakra Bahadur Karki	CPN (UML)	Baitadi
9	Pancheshwar	Gorakh Bahadur Chand	CPN (UML)	Baitadi
10	Surnaya	Ammar Bahadur Kunwar	CPN (UML)	Baitadi
11	Sigas	Hari Singh Dhami	Nepali Congress	Baitadi
12	Shivanath	Karna Singh Saud	Nepali Congress	Baitadi
13	Kedarsyu	Ganesh Bahadur Bohara	CPN (Unified Socialist)	Bajhang
14	Thalara	Prakash Bahadur Rokaya	CPN (UML)	Bajhang
15	Saipal	Manbir Bohara	CPN (UML)	Bajhang
16	Talkot	Kalak Bahadur Rokaya	CPN (UML)	Bajhang
17	Durgathali	Dil Bahadur Thapa	CPN (Maoist Centre)	Bajhang
18	Chhabis Pathibhera	Basant Bahadur Chalaune	CPN (Maoist Centre)	Bajhang
19	Bitthadchir	Amar Singh Mahar	Nepali Congress	Bajhang
20	Khaptad Chhanna	Uttam Bahadur Rokaya	Nepali Congress	Bajhang
21	Masta	Gyan Bahadur Bohara	Nepali Congress	Bajhang
22	Surma	Khadak Bahadur Bohara	Nepali Congress	Bajhang
23	Khaptad Chhededaha	Dil Bahadur Raut	CPN (UML)	Bajura
24	Jagannath	Kali Bahadur Shahi	CPN (UML)	Bajura
25	Gaumul	Hari Bahadur Rokaya	CPN (UML)	Bajura
26	Swami Kartik Khapar	Bharat Bahadur Rokaya	Nepali Congress	Bajura
27	Himali	Govinda Bahadur Malla	Nepali Congress	Bajura
28	Navadurga	Laxmi Prasad Awasthi	Nepali Congress	Dadeldhura
29	Ganyapadhura	Indra Bahadur Karki	Nepali Congress	Dadeldhura
30	Bhageshwar	Hemraj Chadaut	Nepali Congress	Dadeldhura
31	Aalitaal	Sher Singh Parki	CPN (Maoist Centre)	Dadeldhura
32	Ajaymeru	Umesh Prasad Bhatta	CPN (Maoist Centre)	Dadeldhura
33	Naugad	Daljit Singh Dhami	CPN (Maoist Centre)	Darchula
34	Marma	Jaman Singh Dhami	CPN (Maoist Centre)	Darchula
35	Lekam	Ram Datta Joshi	CPN (Maoist Centre)	Darchula
36	Api Himal	Bhakta Singh Thekre Bohara	CPN (Maoist Centre)	Darchula
37	Malikarjun	Heera Singh Dhami	CPN (UML)	Darchula
38	Duhun Rural Municipality	Narendra Bahadur Singh Badal	CPN (UML)	Darchula
39	Vyans (Byans)	Mangal Singh Dhami	CPN (UML)	Darchula
40	Aadarsha	Ganesh Bahadur Khadka	Nepali Congress	Doti
41	Purbichauki	Ram Prasad Upadhyaya	Nepali Congress	Doti
42	K.I. Singh	Lokendra Bahadur Shahi	Nepali Congress	Doti
43	Sayal	Dharmaraj Joshi	Nepali Congress	Doti
44	Badikedar	Bhairab Bahadur Saud	Nepali Congress	Doti
45	Jorayal	Durga Dutta Ojha	CPN (UML)	Doti
46	Bogatan-Phudsil	Kamal Bahadur Gadsila	CPN (Maoist Centre)	Doti
47	Janaki	Ganesh Chaudhary	NUP	Kailali
48	Joshipur	Chitra Bahadur Chaudhary	NUP	Kailali
49	Kailari	Raj Samajh Chaudhary	Nepali Congress	Kailali
50	Bardagoriya	Karna Bahadur Kunwar	CPN (UML)	Kailali
51	Chure	Chakra Bahadur Bogati	CPN (UML)	Kailali
52	Mohanyal	Devi Datta Upadhyay	CPN (Maoist Centre)	Kailali
53	Laljhadi	Nirmal Rana	CPN (UML)	Kanchanpur
54	Beldandi	Harish Chandra Rana	Nepali Congress	Kanchanpur

== See also ==
- 2022 Nepalese local elections
- List of mayors of municipalities in Nepal
- Rural municipality
