= Bungal Municipality =

Bungal
- Municipality
- Location within Sudurpashchim Province Location within Nepal
- Coordinates: 29.58°N 80.87°E
- Country: Nepal
- Province: Sudurpashchim
- District: Bajhang
- No. of wards: 11
- Established: 10 March 2017
- Incorporated (VDC): Dahbagar, Khidatari, Deulikot, Pipalkot and Kaflaseri
- Admin HQ.: Khiratadi

Government
  - Type: Mayor–council
  - Body: Bungal Municipality
  - Mayor: Jay Bahadur Dhami (Nepali Congress)
  - Deputy Mayor: Dhan Bahadur Bohara (CPN (US)

Area
  - Total: 447.59 km^{2} (172.82 sq mi)

Population (2011)
  - Total: 33,224

Human Development Index
  - Literacy: 51.64
- Time zone: UTC+05:45 (NPT)
- Website: bungalmun.gov.np

Bungal is a municipality located in the Bajhang District of Sudurpashchim Province, Nepal. It is bordered by Darchula District to the west, Baitadi District to the south, Surma, Chabispathivera, Durgathali, Kedarseu and Bithadchir to the East and Saipal to the North.

On 10 March 2017, the Government of Nepal announced 744 local-level units under the new constitution of Nepal 2015. establishing Bungal as a municipality. The municipality covers a total area of 447.59 square kilometres (172.82 sq mi) and has a population (according to 2011 Nepal census) is 33224. It is divided into 11 wards. Dahbagar, Khidatari, Deulikot, Pipalkot and Kaflaseri are the previous villages which were merged to form this new local level unit.

Atpali Village is a village in Bungal municipality and is also the ancestral place of the Kamalbathyal family.

== Demographics ==
At the time of the 2011 Nepal census, Bungal Municipality had a population of 33,224. Of these, 100.0% spoke Nepali as their first language.

In terms of ethnicity/caste, 79.8% were Chhetri, 10.2% Kami, 4.2% Hill Brahmin, 1.7% other Dalit, 1.6% Thakuri, 1.1% Sanyasi/Dasnami, 1.0% Damai/Dholi, 0.1% Lohar, 0.1% Sarki, 0.1% other Terai and 0.1% others.

In terms of religion, 100.0% were Hindu.

In terms of literacy, 51.6% could read and write, 3.0% could only read and 45.3% could neither read nor write.
