= Guadarrama (disambiguation) =

Guadarrama may refer to:

Geography:

- Sierra de Guadarrama, a mountain range in the Central System, Spain
  - Guadarrama National Park
  - Guadarrama Pass
  - Guadarrama Tunnel
- Guadarrama, a municipality in Spain
- Guadarrama (river), Spain

People:

- Amador Lugo Guadarrama (1921–2002), Mexican painter and engraver
- Gloria Zarza Guadarrama (born 1984), Mexican Paralympic athlete
- José Guadarrama Márquez, Mexican politician
- José Alberto Guadarrama (born 1972), Mexican soccer player
- Sergio Guadarrama, founder of Celestino, a Manhattan women's evening-wear company
- Sonny Guadarrama (born 1987), American soccer midfielder

== See also ==
- Battle of Guadarrama, Spain in 1937 during the Spanish Civil War
- Clásica a los Puertos de Guadarrama, annual cycle road race in the Sierra de Guadarrama
- Gadaraya
- Guadaíra
