= Pipalkot =

Pipalkot may refer to:

- Pipalkot, Bheri
- Pipalkot, Seti
