= Kadal =

Kadal may refer to:

- Kadal (town) or Kadel, a village in Bajhang District, Seti Zone, Nepal
- Kadal (1968 film), a Malayalam film starring Madhu and Sharada
- Kadal (2013 film), a Tamil film starring Gautam Karthik and Thulasi Nair
  - Kadal (soundtrack), a soundtrack album from the 2013 film, by A. R. Rahman
