= Kot Bhairab =

Coordinates: 29°28′N 81°2′E

Kot Bhairab कोत भैरव
- Village development committee
- Interactive map of Kot Bhairab
- Country: Nepal
- Zone: Seti Zone
- District: Bajhang District

Population (1991)
  - Total: 2,734
  - Religions: Hindu
- Time zone: UTC+5:45 (Nepal Time)

Kot Bhairab is a village in Bajhang District in the Seti Zone of north-western Nepal. At the time of the 1991 Nepal census it had a population of 2,734 and had 506 houses in the village.
