= Rilu =

Rilu रिलु
- Village development committee
- Location in Nepal
- Coordinates: 29.57°N 81.32°E
- Country: Nepal
- Zone: Seti Zone
- District: Bajhang District

Population (1991)
  - Total: 3,153
  - Religions: Hindu
- Time zone: UTC+5:45 (Nepal Time)

Rilu is a village in Bajhang District in the Seti Zone of north-western Nepal. At the time of the 1991 Nepal census it had a population of 3,153 and had 582 houses in the village.
