= Chaudhari, Nepal =

Chaudhari, Nepal चौधारी
- Village development committee
- Location in Nepal
- Coordinates: 29.49°N 81.04°E
- Country: Nepal
- Zone: Seti Zone
- District: Bajhang District

Population (1991)
  - Total: 3,226
  - Religions: Hindu
- Time zone: UTC+5:45 (Nepal Time)

Chaudhari is a village in Bajhang District in the Seti Zone of north-western Nepal. At the time of the 1991 Nepal census it had a population of 3,226 and had 624 houses in the village.
