= Malumela =

Malumela मालुमेला
- Village development committee
- Location in Nepal
- Coordinates: 29.49°N 81.09°E
- Country: Nepal
- Zone: Seti Zone
- District: Bajhang District

Population (1991)
  - Total: 1,855
  - Religions: Hindu
- Time zone: UTC+5:45 (Nepal Time)

Malumela is a village in Bajhang District in the Seti Zone of north-western Nepal. Formerly known to be the headquarter of Malumela Village Development Committee and currently known as ward no 09 of Thalara Rural Municipality. It is one of the major wards in Thalara Rural Municipality. At the time of the 1991 Nepal census it had a population of 1,855 and had 319 houses in the village.
