= Syandi =

Syandi स्यांडि
- Village development committee
- Location in Nepal
- Coordinates: 29.53°N 80.83°E
- Country: Nepal
- Zone: Seti Zone
- District: Bajhang District

Population (2011)
  - Total: 7,569
  - Religions: Hindu
- Time zone: UTC+5:45 (Nepal Time)

Syandi is a village in Bajhang District in the Seti Zone of north-western Nepal. At the time of the 1991 Nepal census it had a population of 3,544 and had 655 houses in the village.
