= Majhigaun =

Coordinates: 29°26′N 81°8′E

Majhigaun माझीगाउँ
- Village development committee
- Interactive map of Majhigaun
- Country: Nepal
- Zone: Seti Zone
- District: Bajhang District

Population (1991)
  - Total: 3,309
  - Religions: Hindu
- Time zone: UTC+5:45 (Nepal Time)

Majhigaun is a village in Bajhang District in the Seti Zone of north-western Nepal. At the time of the 1991 Nepal census it had a population of 3,309 and had 622 houses in the village.
