= Matela, Bajhang =

Coordinates: 29°30′N 81°6′E

Matela, Nepal मटेला
- City
- Interactive map of Matela, Nepal
- Country: Nepal
- Zone: Seti Zone
- District: Bajhang District

Population
  - Religions: Hindu
- Time zone: UTC+5:45 (Nepal Time)

Matela is a village in Bajhang District in the Seti Zone of north-western Nepal.
