= Deulekh =

Coordinates: 29°32′N 80°50′E

Deulekh देउलेख
- Village development committee
- Interactive map of Deulekh
- Country: Nepal
- Zone: Seti Zone
- District: Bajhang District

Population (1991)
  - Total: 2,952
  - Religions: Hindu
- Time zone: UTC+5:45 (Nepal Time)

Deulekh is a village in Bajhang District in the Seti Zone of north-western Nepal. At the time of the 1991 Nepal census it had a population of 2,952 and had 456 houses in the village.
