= Lekhgaun, Bajhang =

Coordinates: 29°33′N 81°2′E

Lekhgaun लेखगाउँ
- Village
- Interactive map of Lekhgaun
- Country: Nepal
- Zone: Seti Zone
- District: Bajhang District

Population (1991)
  - Total: 3,346
- Hindu
- Time zone: UTC+5:45 (Nepal Time)

Lekhgaun is a village in Bajhang District in the Seti Zone of north-western Nepal. At the time of the 1991 Nepal census it had a population of 3,346 and had 626 houses in the village.
