= Byasi =

Byasi व्यासी
- Village development committee
- Location in Nepal
- Coordinates: 29.56°N 81.06°E
- Country: Nepal
- Zone: Seti Zone
- District: Bajhang District

Population (1991)
  - Total: 3,386
  - Religions: Hindu
- Time zone: UTC+5:45 (Nepal Time)

Byasi is a village in Bajhang District in the Seti Zone of north-western Nepal. At the time of the 1991 Nepal census it had a population of 3,386 and had 548 houses in the village.
