= Pitatola =

Village in Nepal

Pitatola is a village in Bajhang District, Sudurpashchim Province in the Seti Zone of north-western Nepal. It is located in Channa Gavisa and is very near to Kaptad.
