= Mashdev =

Mashdev मासदेव
- Village development committee
- Location in Nepal
- Coordinates: 29.53°N 81.30°E
- Country: Nepal
- Zone: Seti Zone
- District: Bajhang District

Population (1991)
  - Total: 2,039
  - Religions: Hindu
- Time zone: UTC+5:45 (Nepal Time)

Mashdev is a village in Bajhang District in the Seti Zone of north-western Nepal. At the time of the 1991 Nepal census it had a population of 2,039 and had 361 houses in the village.
