= Bhairabnath =

Coordinates: 29°31′N 80°58′E

Bhairabnath भैरवनाथ
- Village development committee
- Interactive map of Bhairabnath
- Country: Nepal
- Zone: Seti Zone
- District: Bajhang District

Population (1991)
  - Total: 3,275
  - Religions: Hindu
- Time zone: UTC+5:45 (Nepal Time)

Bhairabnath is a village in Bajhang District in the Seti Zone of north-western Nepal. At the time of the 1991 Nepal census it had a population of 3,275 and had 613 houses in the village.
