= Surma, Nepal =

Surma, Nepal सुरमा
- VDC
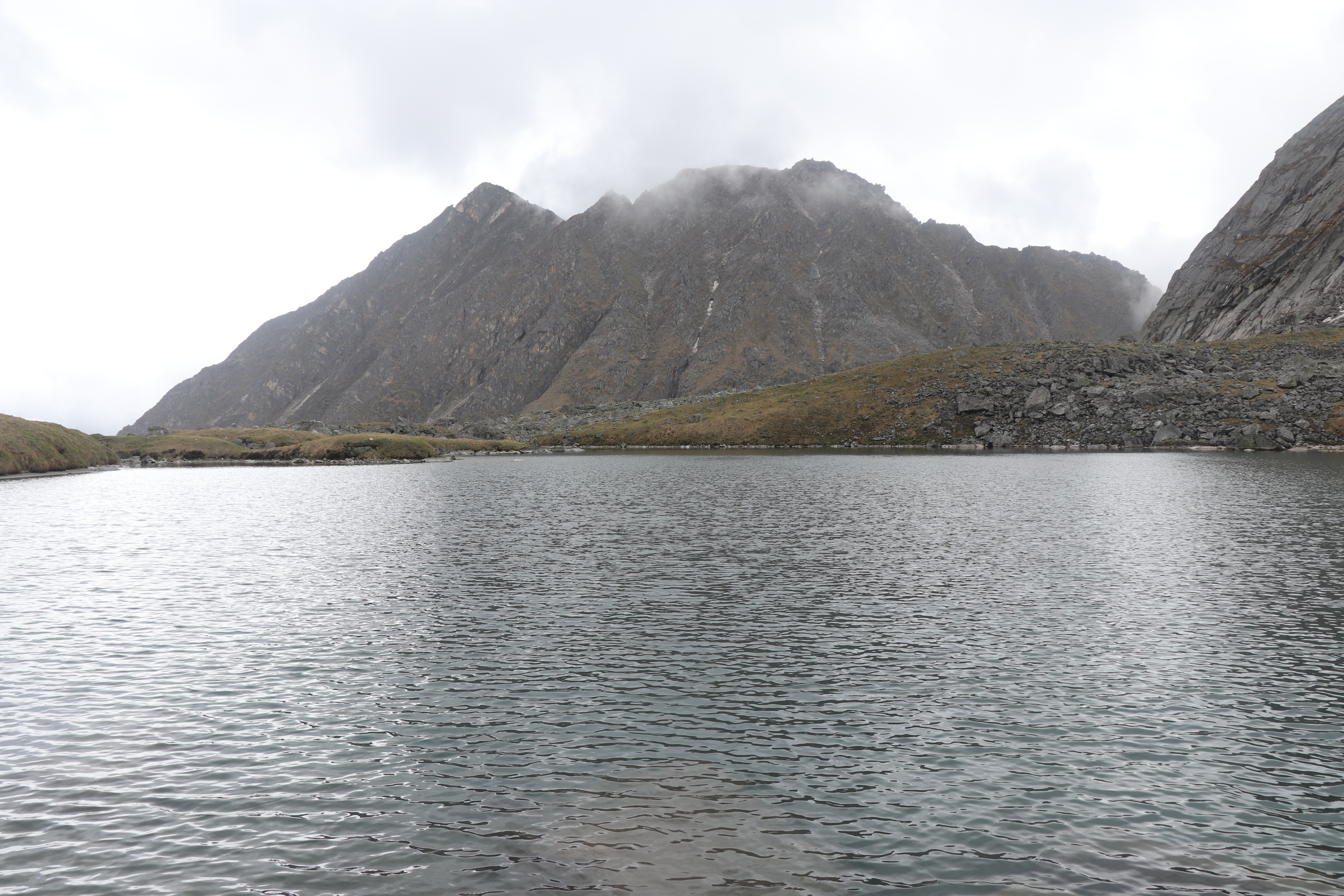
- A lake and mountains in Surma VDC of Bajhang District, Nepal – Surma Sarobar is world secured place. Certified holy place of Surma Devi in the world heritage.

- Location in Nepal
- Coordinates: 29.65°N 81.07°E
- Country: Nepal
- Province: Sudurpashchim Province
- District: Bajhang District

Population (1991)
  - Total: 2,002
  - Religions: Hindu
- Time zone: UTC+5:45 (Nepal Time)

Surma is a former village development committee in Bajhang District in Sudurpashchim Province of western Nepal. At the time of the 1991 Nepal census it had a population of 2,002 and had 367 houses in the village.

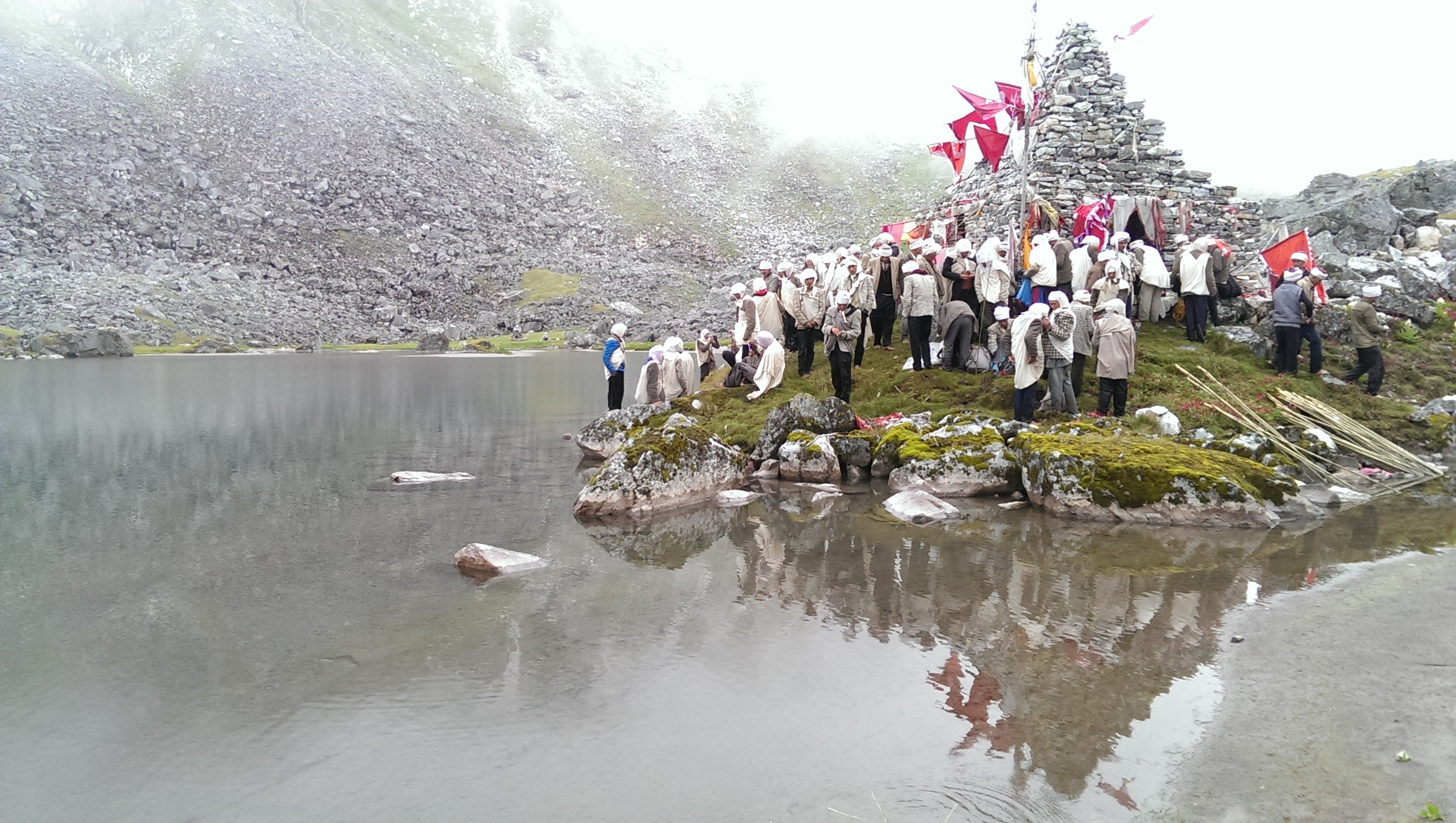
Surma Sarovar Lake is the second highest lake in Nepal located at the foot of the mountain at an altitude of 4350 m above sea level, also called as Mini Kailash for Hindus, a holy lake belongs to the village of Surma in Bajhang district.
