= Kadel, Bajhang =

Coordinates: 29°32′N 81°5′E

Kadel कॅडेल
- Village development committee
- Interactive map of Kadel
- Country: Nepal
- Zone: Seti Zone
- District: Bajhang District

Population (1991)
  - Total: 3,816
  - Religions: Hindu
- Time zone: UTC+5:45 (Nepal Time)

Kadel is a village in Bajhang District in the Seti Zone of north-western Nepal. At the time of the 1991 Nepal census it had a population of 3,816 and had 693 houses in the village.
