= Pipalkot, Bajhang =

Coordinates: 29°37′N 80°52′E

Pipalkot पीपलकोट
- City
- Interactive map of Pipalkot
- Country: Nepal
- Zone: Seti Zone
- District: Bajhang District

Population (1991)
  - Total: 3,296
  - Religions: Hindu
- Time zone: UTC+5:45 (Nepal Time)

Pipalkot is a village in Bajhang District in the Seti Zone of north-western Nepal. At the time of the 1991 Nepal census it had a population of 3,296 and had 611 houses in the village.
