= Gadaraya =

Gorkhai गोर्खाली Gorkhai
- Village development committee
- Nickname: गोर्खाली
- Location in Nepal
- Coordinates: 29.4513781°N 81.2531504°E
- Country: Nepal
- Zone: Seti Zone
- District: Bajhang District
- Elevation: 2,000 m (6,600 ft)

Population (2011)
  - Total: 1,500
  - Religions: Hindu
- Time zone: UTC+5:45 (Nepal Time)
- Postal code: 10500

Gorkhali is a village in Bajhang District in the Seti Zone of north-western Nepal. At the time of the 2011 Nepal census it had a population of 1500 and had 150 houses in the village.
