= Surma Rural Municipality =

Surma Rural Municipality सुर्मा गाउँपालिका
- Rural Municipality
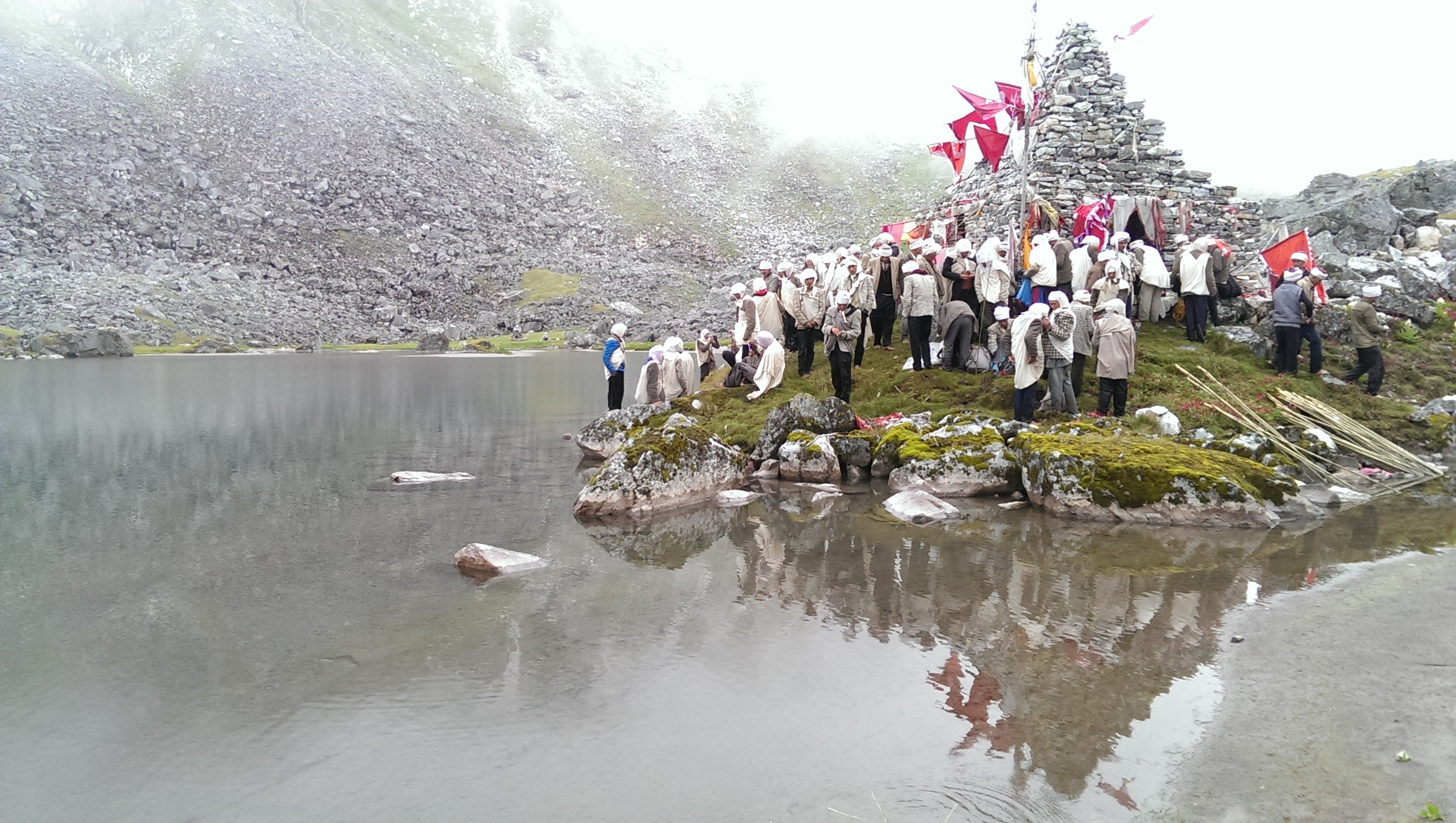

- सुर्मा गाउँपालिका
- Coordinates: 29.6786°N 81.1269°E
- Country: Nepal
- Province: Sudurpashchim Province
- District: Bajhang District

Government
  - Type: Local government

Area
  - Total: 270.8 km^{2} (104.6 sq mi)

Population (2011 census)
  - Total: 9,022
  - Density: 33.32/km^{2} (86.29/sq mi)
- Time zone: UTC+05:45 (Nepal Standard Time)
- Website: http://sunaryamun.gov.np

Surma (Nepali: सुर्मा) is a Gaupalika (Nepali: गाउपालिका, romanized: gaupalika) in Bajhang District in the Sudurpashchim Province of far-western Nepal. Surma has a population of 9022 as of 2011 census .The land area is 270.8 km^{2}. In 2021 Census, the Surma Rural Municipality has a population of 11,082 with 1823 households. The literacy rate of Gaunpalika is 65.6% with 79% male literate and 52.5% female literates.

== Surma Sarovar ==
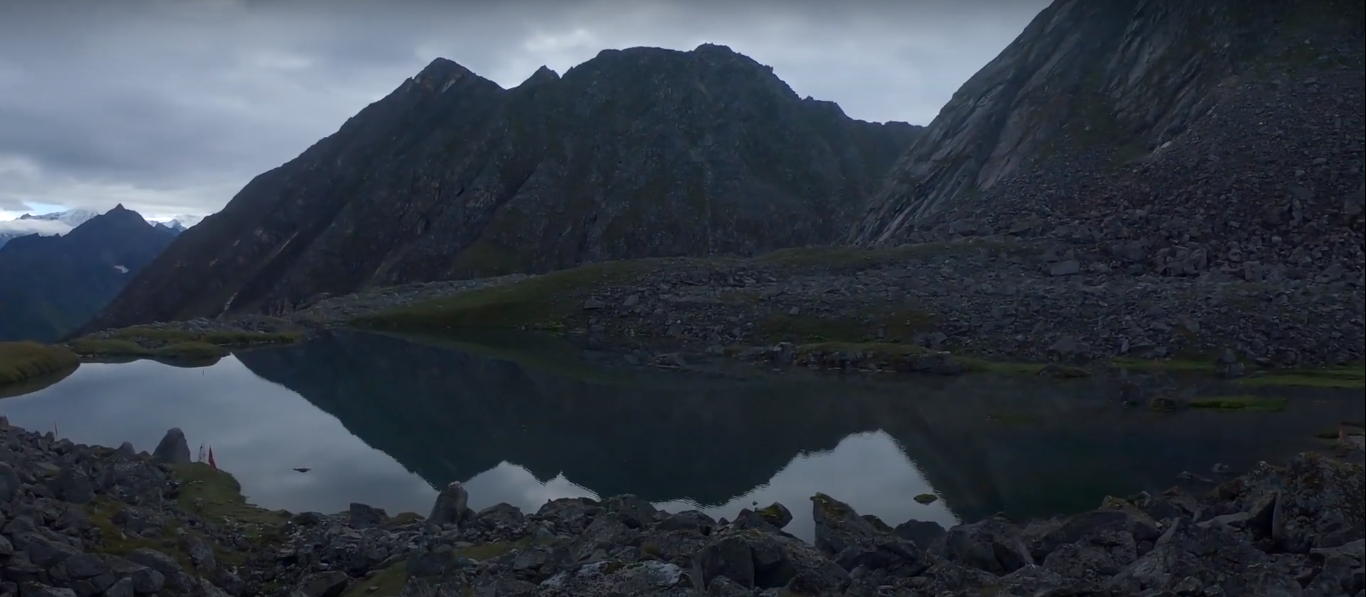
Surma Sarovar

Surma Sarovar is one of the hidden gems in the Sudurpaschim region. Located at an altitude of 4,300 metres, the trail to get there is not easy. walk past high ridges that get to by crossing passes and also get to walk past small lakes and ponds along with meadows with mountains like Jethi Bahurani. The lake is quite holy too as people consider it an option to the holy Mansarovar lake in Tibet.

To reach there, one has to walk for four days from the district headquarters, Chainpur, across the Chande Shikhar Nagna pass at 4,859 metres above sea level. Hindus believe the lake is the abode of Surma Devi, a Hindu goddess.
