= Aadarsha Rural Municipality =

Aadarsha Rural Municipality आदर्श गाउँपालिका
- Rural Municipality
- नेपालको नक्शामा आदर्श गाउँपालिका
- Coordinates: 29.34440°N 80.8769°E
- Country: Nepal
- Province: Sudurpashchim Province
- District: Doti District

Government
  - Type: Local government
  - Body: Village Executive
  - Chairperson: Tek B. Rokkaya
  - Administration head: Surat B. Pariyar

Area
  - Total: 128.47 km^{2} (49.60 sq mi)

Population (2011 census)
  - Total: 23,945
  - Density: 186.39/km^{2} (482.74/sq mi)
- Time zone: UTC+05:45 (Nepal Standard Time)
- Website: http://aadarshamun.gov.np

Aadarsha (Nepali: आदर्श) is a Gaupalika in Doti District in the Sudurpashchim Province of far-western Nepal. Aadarsha has a population of 23945.The land area is 128.47 km^{2}.

== Demographics ==
At the time of the 2011 Nepal census, Aadarsha Rural municipality had a population of 24,482. Of these, 99.4% spoke Doteli, 0.4% Nepali and 0.1% other languages as their first language.

In terms of ethnicity/caste, 58.4% were Chhetri, 13.3% Hill Brahmin, 12.0% Kami, 6.2% other Dalit, 5.0% Damai/Dholi, 1.8% Badi, 1.8% Sarki, 0.9% Thakuri, 0.3% Lohar, 0.1% other Terai and 0.1% others.

In terms of religion, 100.0% were Hindu.

In terms of literacy, 45.5% could read and write, 3.1% could only read and 50.7% could neither read nor write.
