= Saipal Rural Municipality =

Saipal Rural Municipality सइपाल गाउँपालिका
- Rural Municipality
- Country: Nepal
- Province: Sudurpashchim Province
- District: Bajhang District

Government
  - Type: Local government

Area
  - Total: 1,467.27 km^{2} (566.52 sq mi)
  - Rank: 6th (Nepal)

Population (2011 census)
  - Total: 2,182
  - Density: 1.487/km^{2} (3.852/sq mi)
- Time zone: UTC+05:45 (Nepal Standard Time)
- Website: http://kandamun.gov.np

Saipal (Nepali: सइपाल) is a Gaupalika (Nepali: गाउपालिका, romanized: gaupalika) in Bajhang District in the Sudurpashchim Province of far-western Nepal. Saipal has a population of 2182.The land area is 1467.27 km^{2}.
