= Lekam Rural Municipality =

Lekam Rural Municipality लेकम गाउँपालिका
- Rural Municipality
- लेकम गाउँपालिका Lekam Rural Municipality (Nepal)
- Coordinates: 29.659°N 80.458°E
- Country: Nepal
- Province: Sudurpashchim Province
- District: Darchula District

Government
  - Type: Local government
  - Chairperson: Ram Datt Joshi
  - Administrative head: Amba Datt Joshi

Area
  - Total: 83.98 km^{2} (32.42 sq mi)

Population (2011 census)
  - Total: 14,838
  - Density: 176.7/km^{2} (457.6/sq mi)
- Time zone: UTC+05:45 (Nepal Standard Time)
- Website: https://lekammun.gov.np

Lekam (Nepali: लेकम) is a Rural Municipality in Darchula District in the Sudurpashchim Province of far-western Nepal. Lekam has a population of 14838.The land area is 83.98 km^{2}.
