= Ganyapadhura Rural Municipality =

Rural Municipality in Sudurpashchim Province, Nepal

Ganyapadhura Rural Municipality गन्यापधुरा गाउँपालिका
- Rural Municipality
- गन्यापधुरा गाउँपालिका Ganyapadhura Rural Municipality (Nepal)
- Coordinates: 29.24°N 80.679°E
- Country: Nepal
- Province: Sudurpashchim Province
- District: Dadeldhura District

Government
  - Type: Local government
  - Chairperson: Indra Bahadur Karki
  - Administrative head: Dilip K. Tamang

Area
  - Total: 135.65 km^{2} (52.37 sq mi)

Population (2011 census)
  - Total: 15,093
  - Density: 111.26/km^{2} (288.17/sq mi)
- Time zone: UTC+05:45 (Nepal Standard Time)
- Website: http://ganyapadhuramun.gov.np

Ganyapadhura (Nepali: गन्यापधुरा) is a Gaupalika (Nepali: गाउपालिका, romanized: gaupalika) in Dadeldhura District in the Sudurpashchim Province of far-western Nepal. Ganyapadhura has a population of 15093. The land area is 135.65 km^{2}.

== Notable people ==
- Sher Bahadur Deuba, current Prime Minister of Nepal.
