= Sunarya Rural Municipality =

Surnaya Rural Municipality सुर्नया गाउँपालिका
- Rural Municipality
- सुर्नया गाउँपालिका
- Coordinates: 29.5261°N 80.6066°E
- Country: Nepal
- Province: Sudurpashchim Province
- District: Baitadi District

Government
  - Type: Local government

Area
  - Total: 124.52 km^{2} (48.08 sq mi)

Population (2011 census)
  - Total: 18,549
  - Density: 148.96/km^{2} (385.82/sq mi)
- Time zone: UTC+05:45 (Nepal Standard Time)
- Website: https://sunaryamun.gov.np/

Surnaya (Nepali: सुर्नया) is a Gaupalika (Nepali: गाउपालिका, romanized: gaupalika) in Baitadi District in the Sudurpashchim Province of far-western Nepal. Surnaya has a population of 18549.The land area is 124.52 km^{2}.
