= Shivanath Rural Municipality =

Shivanath Rural Municipality शिवनाथ गाउँपालिका
- Rural Municipality
- शिवनाथ गाउँपालिका
- Coordinates: 29.37182°N 80.3370°E
- Country: Nepal
- Province: Sudurpashchim Province
- District: Baitadi District

Government
  - Type: Local government
  - Chairperson: Karna Singh Saud(NC)
  - Vice chairperson: Kushma Chand (NC)
  - Administrative Head: Tank Prasad Pant

Area
  - Total: 81.65 km^{2} (31.53 sq mi)

Population (2011 census)
  - Total: 17,115
  - Density: 209.6/km^{2} (542.9/sq mi)
- Time zone: UTC+05:45 (Nepal Standard Time)
- Website: http://shivanathmun.gov.np

Shivanath (Nepali: शिवनाथ) is a Gaupalika (गाउपालिका, gaupalika) in Baitadi District in the Sudurpashchim Province of far-western Nepal.

Shivanath has a population of 17,115. The land area is 81.65 km^{2}.
