= Masta Rural Municipality =

Masta Rural Municipality मष्टा गाउँपालिका
- Rural Municipality
- मष्टा गाउँपालिका
- Coordinates: 29.5458°N 81.2917°E
- Country: Nepal
- Province: Sudurpashchim Province
- District: Bajhang District

Government
  - Type: Local government

Area
  - Total: 109.24 km^{2} (42.18 sq mi)

Population (2011 census)
  - Total: 14,951
  - Density: 136.86/km^{2} (354.48/sq mi)
- Time zone: UTC+05:45 (Nepal Standard Time)
- Website: http://mastamun.gov.np

Masta (Nepali: मष्टा) is a Gaupalika (Nepali: गाउपालिका, romanized: gaupalika) in Bajhang District in the Sudurpashchim Province of far-western Nepal. Masta has a population of 14951.The land area is 109.24 km^{2}.

== Demographics ==
At the time of the 2011 Nepal census, Masta Rural Municipality had a population of 14,951. Of these, 71.2% spoke Nepali and 28.7% Bajhangi as their first language.

In terms of ethnicity/caste, 77.2% were Chhetri, 10.1% other Dalit, 3.5% Hill Brahmin, 3.1% Sarki, 2.2% Thakuri, 1.9% Kami, 1.1% Damai/Dholi, 0.8% Sanyasi/Dasnami and 0.1% other Terai.

In terms of religion, 100.0% were Hindu.

In terms of literacy, 54.5% could read and write, 1.7% could only read and 43.7% could neither read nor write.
