= Talkot Rural Municipality =

Talkot Rural Municipality तलकोट गाउँपालिका
- Rural Municipality
- तलकोट गाउँपालिका
- Coordinates: 29.6609°N 81.2963°E
- Country: Nepal
- Province: Sudurpashchim Province
- District: Bajhang District

Government
  - Type: Local government
  - Chairperson: Lal B.Bista
  - Administrative Head: Siddha Raj Bhandari

Area
  - Total: 335.26 km^{2} (129.44 sq mi)

Population (2011 census)
  - Total: 11,557
  - Density: 34.472/km^{2} (89.281/sq mi)
- Time zone: UTC+05:45 (Nepal Standard Time)
- Website: http://talkotmun.gov.np

Talkot (Nepali: तलकोट) is a Gaupalika (Nepali: गाउपालिका, romanized: gaupalika) in Bajhang District in the Sudurpashchim Province of far-western Nepal. Talkot has a population of 11557.The land area is 335.26 km^{2}.

== Demographics ==
At the time of the 2011 Nepal census, Talkot Rural Municipality had a population of 11,569. Of these, 82.4% spoke Nepali, 17.1% Bajhangi, 0.2% Sherpa, 0.1% Tamang and 0.1% other languages as their first language.

In terms of ethnicity/caste, 66.2% were Chhetri, 10.7% Thakuri, 9.7% Kami, 5.5% Hill Brahmin, 2.7% Damai/Dholi, 2.5% Sarki, 1.2% other Dalit, 0.3% Tamang, 0.2% Badi, 0.2% Bhote, 0.2% Newar, 0.2% other Terai, 0.1% foreigners, 0.1% Magar, 0.1% Rajput and 0.2% others.

In terms of religion, 99.4% were Hindu and 0.5% Buddhist.

In terms of literacy, 61.0% could read and write, 2.7% could only read and 36.2% could neither read nor write.
