= Aalitaal Rural Municipality =

Place in Nepal

Aalitaal Rural Municipality आलिताल गाउँपालिका
- Rural Municipality
- नेपालको नक्शामा आलिताल गाउँपालिका
- Coordinates: 29.1351°N 80.5124°E
- Country: Nepal

Government
  - Type: Local government
  - Chairperson: Sher Singh Parki
  - Diputy Chairperson: Maina Kumari Rawal
  - Administrative Head: Ganesh datt Bhatt
  - Engineer: Aakash Joshi

Area
  - Total: 292.87 km^{2} (113.08 sq mi)

Population (2011 census)
  - Total: 18,531
  - Density: 63.274/km^{2} (163.88/sq mi)
- Time zone: UTC+05:45 (Nepal Standard Time)
- Website: https://aalitalmun.gov.np/

Aalitaal (Nepali: आलिताल) is a Gaupalika in Dadeldhura District in the Sudurpashchim Province of far-western Nepal. Aalitaal has a population of 18531.The land area is 292.87 km^{2}.

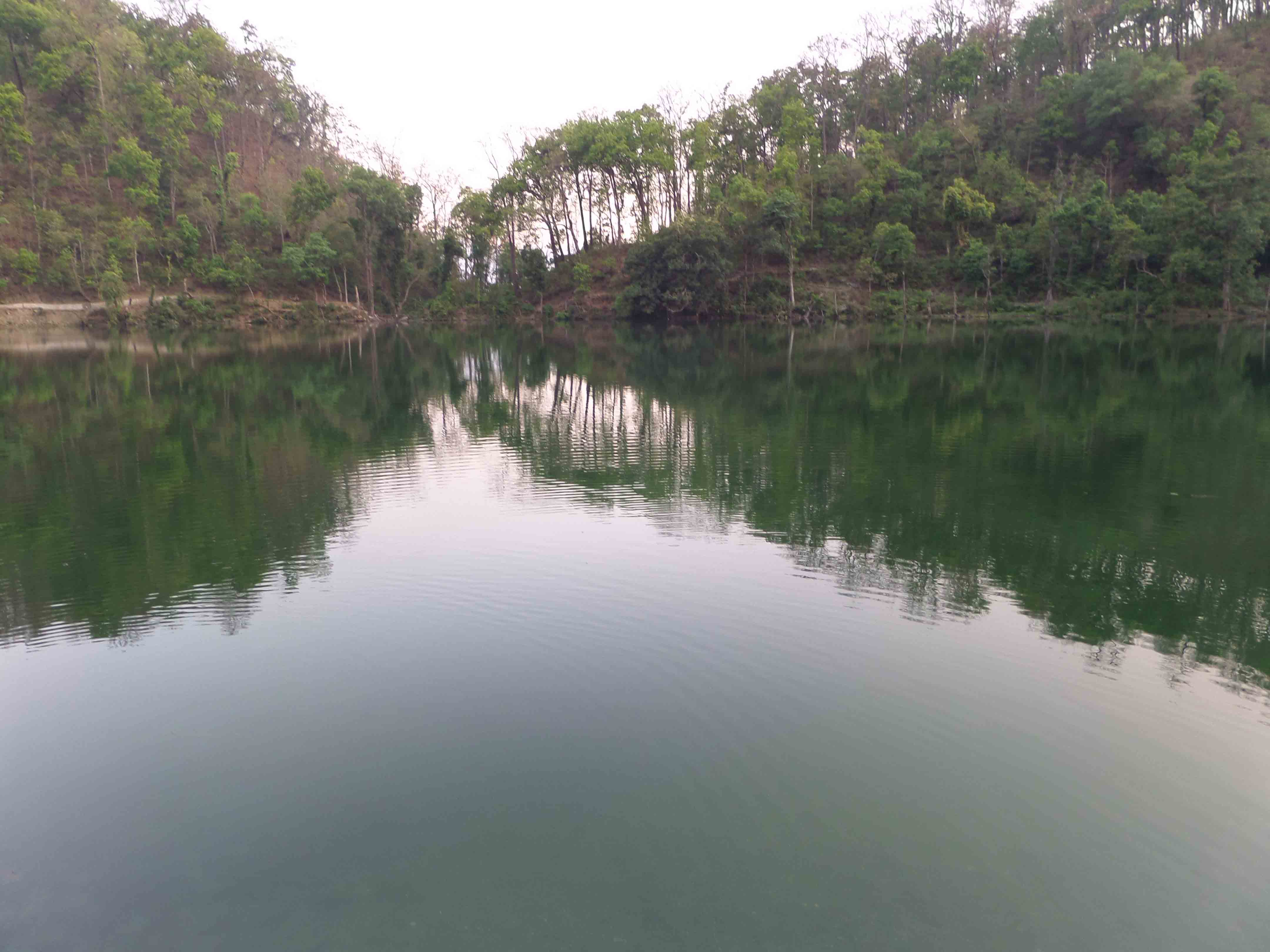
Aalital Lake in Dadheldhura district below the Mahabharat range. It is located at a height of 800m from the sea level
