= Bitthadchir Rural Municipality =

Bitthadchir Rural Municipality बित्थडचिर गाउँपालिका
- Rural Municipality
- बित्थडचिर गाउँपालिका
- Coordinates: 29.5164°N 80.8352°E
- Country: Nepal
- Province: Sudurpashchim Province
- District: Bajhang District

Government
  - Type: Local government
  - Chairperson: Ammar Singh Mahar

Area
  - Total: 86.15 km^{2} (33.26 sq mi)

Population (2011 census)
  - Total: 17,154
  - Density: 199.1/km^{2} (515.7/sq mi)
- Time zone: UTC+05:45 (Nepal Standard Time)
- Website: http://bitthadchirmun.gov.np

Bitthadchir (Nepali: बित्थडचिर) is a Gaupalika (Nepali: गाउपालिका, romanized: gaupalika) in Bajhang District in the Sudurpashchim Province of far-western Nepal. Bitthadchir has a population of 17154.The land area is 86.15 km^{2}.

== Demographics ==
At the time of the 2011 Nepal census, Bitthadchir Rural Municipality had a population of 18,072. Of these, 95.0% spoke Nepali and 5.0% Doteli as their first language.

In terms of ethnicity/caste, 75.2% were Chhetri, 11.7% Kami, 6.8% Hill Brahmin, 2.7% other Dalit, 1.4% Damai/Dholi, 1.0% Thakuri, 0.9% Sanyasi/Dasnami, 0.2% Sarki, 0.1% other Terai and 0.1% others.

In terms of religion, 100.0% were Hindu.

In terms of literacy, 54.5% could read and write, 4.2% could only read and 41.2% could neither read nor write.
