= Marma Rural Municipality =

Marma Rural Municipality मार्मा गाउँपालिका
- Rural Municipality
- मार्मा गाउँपालिका Marma Rural Municipality (Nepal)
- Coordinates: 29.7388°N 80.821°E
- Country: Nepal
- Province: Sudurpashchim Province
- District: Darchula District

Government
  - Type: Local government
  - Chairperson: Jaman Singh Dhami
  - Administrative head: Ram Kumar Rana

Area
  - Total: 208.06 km^{2} (80.33 sq mi)

Population (2011 census)
  - Total: 14,956
  - Density: 71.883/km^{2} (186.18/sq mi)
- Time zone: UTC+05:45 (Nepal Standard Time)
- Website: http://marmamun.gov.np

Marma (Nepali: मार्मा) is a Gaupalika in Darchula District in the Sudurpashchim Province of far-western Nepal. Marma has a population of 14956. The land area is 208.06 km^{2}.
