= Chhabis Pathibhera Rural Municipality =

Chhabis Pathivera Rural Municipality छब्बीसपाथिभेरा गाउँपालिका
- Rural Municipality
- छब्बीसपाथिभेरा गाउँपालिका
- Coordinates: 29.5594°N 81.058°E
- Country: Nepal
- Province: Sudurpashchim Province
- District: Bajhang District

Government
  - Type: Local government
  - Chairperson: Basanta Chalaune

Area
  - Total: 116.34 km^{2} (44.92 sq mi)

Population (2011 census)
  - Total: 16,296
  - Density: 140.07/km^{2} (362.79/sq mi)
- Time zone: UTC+05:45 (Nepal Standard Time)
- Website: http://chhabispathiveramun.gov.np

Chhabis Pathibhera (Nepali: छब्बीसपाथिभेरा) is a Gaupalika (Nepali: गाउपालिका, romanized: gaupalika) in Bajhang District in the Sudurpashchim Province of far-western Nepal. Chhabis Pathibhera has a population of 16296.The land area is 116.34 km^{2}.
