= Pancheshwar Rural Municipality =

Pancheshwar Rural Municipality पञ्चेश्वर गाउँपालिका
- Rural Municipality
- पञ्चेश्वर गाउँपालिका
- Coordinates: 29.4479°N 80.3207°E
- Country: Nepal
- Province: Sudurpashchim Province
- District: Baitadi District

Government
  - Type: Local government
  - Chairperson: Gorkh Bahadur Chand
  - Administrative Head: Rupesh Sharma

Area
  - Total: 120.41 km^{2} (46.49 sq mi)

Population (2011 census)
  - Total: 18,766
  - Density: 155.85/km^{2} (403.65/sq mi)
- Time zone: UTC+05:45 (Nepal Standard Time)
- Website: http://pancheshwormun.gov.np

Pancheshwar (Nepali: पञ्चेश्वर) is a Gaupalika (Nepali: गाउपालिका, romanized: gaupalika) in Baitadi District in the Sudurpashchim Province of far-western Nepal. Pancheshwar has a population of 18766.The land area is 120.41 km^{2}.
