= Purbichauki Rural Municipality =

Rural Municipality in Sudurpashchim Province, Nepal

Purbichauki Rural Municipality पूर्वीचौकी गाउँपालिका
- Rural Municipality
- पूर्वीचौकी गाउँपालिका Purbichauki Rural Municipality (Nepal)
- Coordinates: 29.2747°N 81.066°E
- Country: Nepal
- Province: Sudurpashchim Province
- District: Doti District

Government
  - Type: Local government
  - Chairperson: Ram Parsad upadhya
  - Administrative Head: Bikram shrestha

Area
  - Total: 117.66 km^{2} (45.43 sq mi)

Population (2011 census)
  - Total: 22,483
  - Density: 191.08/km^{2} (494.91/sq mi)
- Time zone: UTC+05:45 (Nepal Standard Time)
- Website: http://purbichaukimun.gov.np

Purbichauki (Nepali: पूर्वीचौकी) is a Gaupalika in Doti District in the Sudurpashchim Province of far-western Nepal. Purbichauki has a population of 22483.The land area is 117.66 km^{2}.

== Demographics ==
At the time of the 2011 Nepal census, Purbichauki Rural Municipality had a population of 22,489. Of these, 99.0% spoke Doteli, 0.7% Nepali, 0.1% Achhami, 0.1% Maithili and 0.1% other languages as their first language.

In terms of ethnicity/caste, 69.2% were Chhetri, 11.1% Kami, 6.9% other Dalit, 4.5% Damai/Dholi, 3.1% Badi, 1.9% Hill Brahmin, 1.5% Lohar, 0.6% Newar, 0.3% Sanyasi/Dasnami, 0.2% Terai Brahmin, 0.2% Magar, 0.1% other Terai, 0.1% Chamar/Harijan/Ram and 0.3% others.

In terms of religion, 99.9% were Hindu.

In terms of literacy, 51.2% could read and write, 3.4% could only read and 45.3% could neither read nor write.
