= Dogdakedar Rural Municipality =

Dogdakedar Rural Municipality दोगडाकेदार गाउँपालिका
- Rural Municipality
- दोगडाकेदार गाउँपालिका
- Coordinates: 29.5970°N 80.5302°E
- Country: Nepal
- Province: Sudurpashchim Province
- District: Baitadi District

Government
  - Type: Local government
  - Chairperson: Charka Bahadur Karki
  - Administration Head: Rabindra B. Dhami

Area
  - Total: 126.38 km^{2} (48.80 sq mi)

Population (2011 census)
  - Total: 24,632
  - Density: 194.90/km^{2} (504.80/sq mi)
- Time zone: UTC+05:45 (Nepal Standard Time)
- Website: https://dogdakedarmun.gov.np

Dogdakedar (Nepali: दोगडाकेदार) is a Gaupalika (Nepali: गाउपालिका, romanized: gaupalika) in Baitadi District in the Sudurpashchim Province of far-western Nepal. Dogdakedar has a population of 24632.The land area is 126.38 km^{2}.
