= Dilashaini Rural Municipality =

Dilashaini Rural Municipality डिलाशैनी गाउँपालिका
- Rural Municipality
- डिलाशैनी गाउँपालिका
- Coordinates: 29.66527°N 80.6495°E
- Country: Nepal
- Province: Sudurpashchim Province
- District: Baitadi District

Government
  - Type: Local government
  - Chairperson: Santosh Prakash Joshi
  - Vice Chairperson: Bhagirath Bohara
  - Administrative Head: Ganesh Singh Bohara

Area
  - Total: 125.28 km^{2} (48.37 sq mi)

Population (2023 census)
  - Total: 22,966
  - Density: 183.32/km^{2} (474.79/sq mi)
- Time zone: UTC+05:45 (Nepal Standard Time)
- Website: http://dilasainimun.gov.np

Dilashaini (Nepali: डिलाशैनी) is a Gaupalika (Nepali: गाउपालिका, romanized: gaupalika) in Baitadi District in the Sudurpashchim Province of far-western Nepal. Dilashaini has a population of 22966.The land area is 125.28 km^{2}.

This municipality was made by merging Kotpetara, Rudreshwar, Mathairaj, Dilasaini and Gokuleshwor VDCs.
