= Sigas Rural Municipality =

Sigas Rural Municipality सिगास गाउँपालिका
- Rural Municipality
- सिगास गाउँपालिका
- Coordinates: 29.45071°N 80.7825°E
- Country: Nepal
- Province: Sudurpashchim Province
- District: Baitadi District

Government
  - Type: Local government
  - Chairperson: Hari Singh Dhami
  - Administration Head: Tika Singh Dhami

Area
  - Total: 245.44 km^{2} (94.76 sq mi)

Population (2021 census)
  - Total: 22,882
  - Density: 93.228/km^{2} (241.46/sq mi)
- Time zone: UTC+05:45 (Nepal Standard Time)
- Website: http://sigasmun.gov.np

Sigas (Nepali: सिगास) is a Gaupalika (Nepali: गाउपालिका, romanized: gaupalika) in Baitadi District in the Sudurpashchim Province of far-western Nepal. According to Census 2021, Sigas has a population of 21,814. The land area is 245.44 km^{2}.
