= Thalara Rural Municipality =

Thalara Rural Municipality थलारा गाउँपालिका
- Rural Municipality
- थलारा गाउँपालिका
- Coordinates: 29.4498°N 81.008°E
- Country: Nepal
- Province: Sudurpashchim Province
- District: Bajhang District

Government
  - Type: Local government
  - Chairperson: Prakash Rokaya
  - Administrative head: Prayagraj padhya

Area
  - Total: 105.51 km^{2} (40.74 sq mi)

Population (2011 census)
  - Total: 17,952
  - Density: 170.15/km^{2} (440.67/sq mi)
- Time zone: UTC+05:45 (Nepal Standard Time)
- Postal code: 10509
- Website: https://thalaramun.gov.np

Thalara (Nepali: थलारा) is a gaupalika (rural municipality) in Bajhang District in the Sudurpashchim Province of far-western Nepal. As of 2011, Thalara has a population of 17952. The land area is 105.51 km^{2}.

== Demographics ==
At the time of the 2011 Nepal census, Thalara Rural Municipality had a population of 17,978. Of these, 85.9% spoke Nepali, 14.0% Bajhangi and 0.1% other languages as their first language.

In terms of ethnicity/caste, 46.5% were Chhetri, 23.1% Hill Brahmin, 14.2% other Dalit, 4.4% Kami, 4.0% Thakuri, 3.6% Sarki, 2.2% Damai/Dholi, 1.4% Sanyasi/Dasnami, 0.4% Badi, 0.1% Gurung, 0.1% Newar and 0.1% others.

In terms of religion, 99.9% were Hindu and 0.1% others.

In terms of literacy, 59.2% could read and write, 4.2% could only read and 36.4% could neither read nor write.

== History ==
Thalara was previously a village development committee (VDC). It joined together with other former VDCs: Dangaji, Parakatne, Kot Bhairab, Koiralakot and Malumela.
