= Kedar-Syun Rural Municipality =

Kedarsyu Rural Municipality केदारस्यु गाउँपालिका
- Rural Municipality
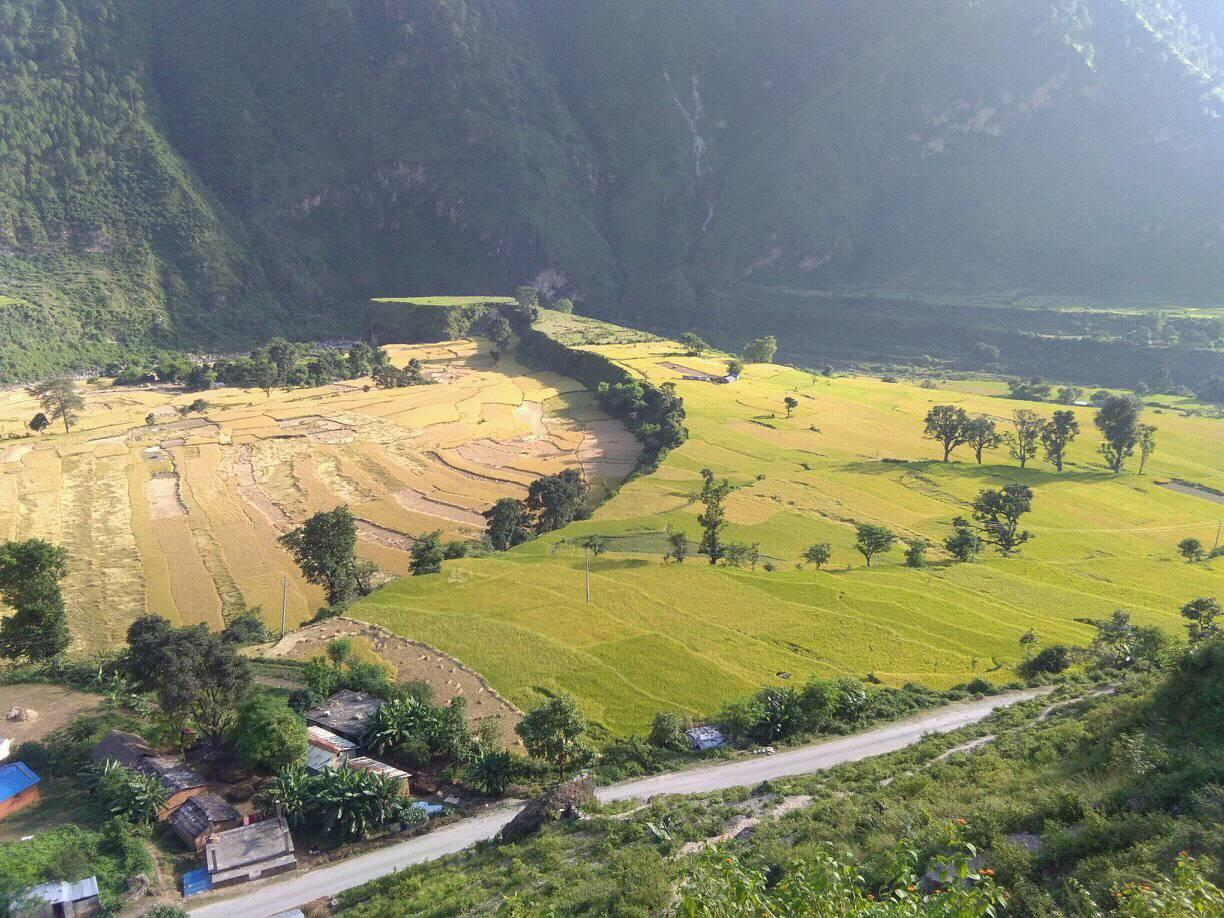

- केदारस्यु गाउँपालिका
- Coordinates: 29.5134°N 80.9350°E
- Country: Nepal
- Province: Sudurpashchim Province
- District: Bajhang District

Government
  - Type: Local government
  - Chairperson: Barka B. Rokaya
  - Administration Head: Deepak K. Rawal

Area
  - Total: 113.91 km^{2} (43.98 sq mi)

Population (2011 census)
  - Total: 21,307
  - Density: 187.05/km^{2} (484.46/sq mi)
- Time zone: UTC+05:45 (Nepal Standard Time)
- Website: https://www.kedarasyumun.gov.np/

Kedarsyu (Nepali: केदारस्यु) is a Gaupalika (Nepali: गाउपालिका, romanized: gaupalika) in Bajhang District in the Sudurpashchim Province of far-western Nepal. Kedarsyu has a population of 21307.The land area is 113.91 km^{2}.

== Demographics ==
At the time of the 2011 Nepal census, Kedarsyu Rural Municipality had a population of 21,316. Of these, 51.2% spoke Nepali, 48.0% Bajhangi, 0.2% Doteli, 0.1% Baitadeli, 0.1% Gurung, 0.1% Rai and 0.2% other languages as their first language.

In terms of ethnicity/caste, 70.2% were Chhetri, 10.0% other Dalit, 7.8% Hill Brahmin, 5.9% Thakuri, 3.9% Kami, 1.0% Damai/Dholi, 0.6% Sanyasi/Dasnami, 0.2% Sarki, 0.1% Gurung, 0.1% Rai, 0.1% other Terai and 0.2% others.

In terms of religion, 99.9% were Hindu.

In terms of literacy, 52.3% could read and write, 3.9% could only read and 43.8% could neither read nor write.
