= Khaptad Chhededaha Rural Municipality =

Khaptad Chhededaha Rural Municipality खप्तड छेडेदह गाउँपालिका
- Rural Municipality
- खप्तड छेडेदह गाउँपालिका
- Coordinates: 29.4067°N 81.2989°E
- Country: Nepal
- Province: Sudurpashchim Province
- District: Bajura District

Government
  - Type: Local government

Area
  - Total: 135.08 km^{2} (52.15 sq mi)

Population (2011 census)
  - Total: 18,575
  - Density: 137.51/km^{2} (356.15/sq mi)
- Time zone: UTC+05:45 (Nepal Standard Time)
- Website: https://www.chhededahamun.gov.np/

Khaptad Chhededaha (Nepali: खप्तड छेडेदह) is a Gaupalika (Nepali: गाउपालिका, romanized: gaupalika) in Bajura District in the Sudurpashchim Province of far-western Nepal. Khaptad Chhededaha has a population of 18575. The land area is 135.08 km^{2}.
