= Pandav Gufa Rural Municipality =

Jagannath Rural Municipality जगन्नाथगाउँपालिका
- Location in Nepal
- Coordinates: 29.45°N 81.62°E
- Country: Nepal
- Province: Sudurpashchim Province
- District: Bajura
- Rural Municipality: Jagannath Rural Municipality
- No.of wards: 6

Government
  - Type: Gaunpalika Rural Council
  - Mayor: Kali Bahadur Shahi
  - Deputy Mayor: Marukala Bista

Area
  - Total: 171.72 km^{2} (66.30 sq mi)

Population (2017/18)
  - Total: 9,432
  - Religion: Hindu
- Time zone: UTC+5:45 (Nepal Time)
- Postal code: 10600
- Headquarter: juddi
- Website: jagganathmun.gov.np

Jagannath Rural Municipality (Nepali: जगन्नाथ गाउँपालिका) is the newly formed rural municipality in Bajura District in the Sudurpashchim Province of Nepal. It was formed in March 2017, when Government of Nepal decided to restrict all old administrative structure and announced 744 local level units in line with the Constitution of Nepal 2015.

== History ==
It was formed by merging previous VDC named Gotre, and ward no 1 to 8 of Jagannath. First it was named as PandavGufa rural municipality, later on the name was changed to Jagannath Rural municipality. Jagannath Rural Municipality has an area of 171.72 square kilometres (66.30 sq mi) and the population of this municipality is 9,432. It is the third smallest rural municipality in terms of population and area. It is divided into six wards and the headquarter of this newly formed municipality is at Juddi. It is unique in its unity in diversity.

== Demographics ==
At the time of the 2011 Nepal census, Jagannath Rural Municipality had a population of 9,432. Of these, 99.7% spoke Nepali and 0.3% other languages as their first language.

In terms of ethnicity/caste, 43.1% were Chhetri, 16.6% Sarki, 13.4% Thakuri, 10.8% Damai/Dholi, 5.5% Sanyasi/Dasnami, 5.2% Kami, 3.9% Lohar, 0.9% Hill Brahmin, 0.2% Dhanuk, 0.1% Tharu and 0.2% others.

In terms of religion, 99.7% were Hindu and 0.3% Christian.

In terms of literacy, 53.5% could read and write, 2.5% could only read and 44.0% could neither read nor write.
