= Khaptadchhanna Rural Municipality =

Khaptad Chhanna Rural Municipality छान्ना गाउँपालिका
- Rural Municipality
- छान्ना गाउँपालिका
- Coordinates: 29.4548°N 81.198°E
- Country: Nepal
- Province: Sudurpashchim Province
- District: Bajhang District

Government
  - Type: Local government
  - Chairperson: Uttam Bahadur Rokaya
  - Acting Chief Administrative Officer: Deepak Kumar Rawal

Area
  - Total: 113.52 km^{2} (43.83 sq mi)

Population (2011 census)
  - Total: 15,893
  - Density: 140.00/km^{2} (362.60/sq mi)
- Time zone: UTC+05:45 (Nepal Standard Time)
- Website: https://khaptadchhannamun.gov.np/

Chhanna (Nepali: छान्ना) is a Gaupalika (Nepali: गाउपालिका, romanized: gaupalika) in Bajhang District in the Sudurpashchim Province of far-western Nepal. Chhanna has a population of 15893.The land area is 113.52 km^{2}.

== Demographics ==
At the time of the 2011 Nepal census, Khaptadchhanna Rural Municipality had a population of 15,903. Of these, 81.8% spoke Nepali and 18.2% Bajhangi as their first language.

In terms of ethnicity/caste, 57.8% were Chhetri, 13.5% Hill Brahmin, 10.7% Kami, 7.6% Thakuri, 3.3% Sarki, 2.8% Sanyasi/Dasnami, 1.6% Damai/Dholi, 1.0% other Dalit, 0.6% Badi, 0.3% Bengali, 0.3% Newar, 0.2% other Terai, 0.1% Rajput and 0.2% others.

In terms of religion, 99.9% were Hindu and 0.1% others.

In terms of literacy, 59.4% could read and write, 2.5% could only read and 38.1% could neither read nor write.
