= Bajhang District =

Coordinates: 29°33′N 81°12′E

Bajhang District बझाङ
- District
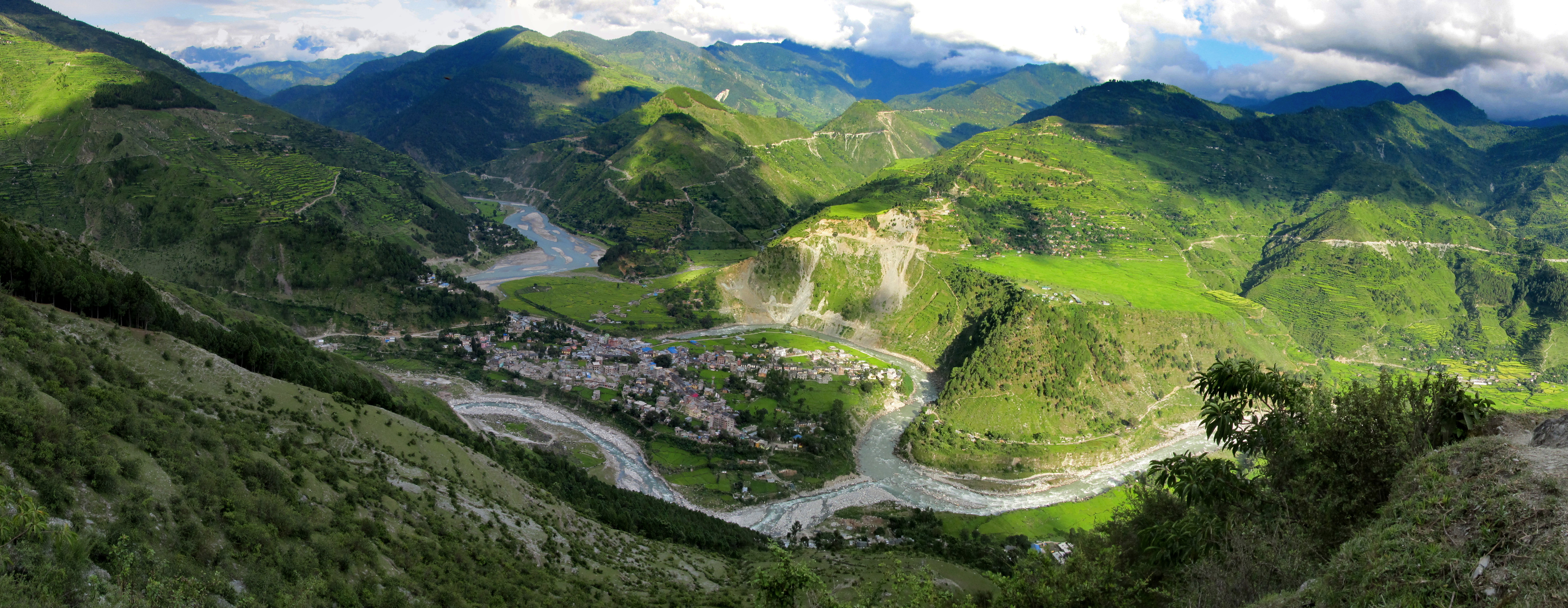

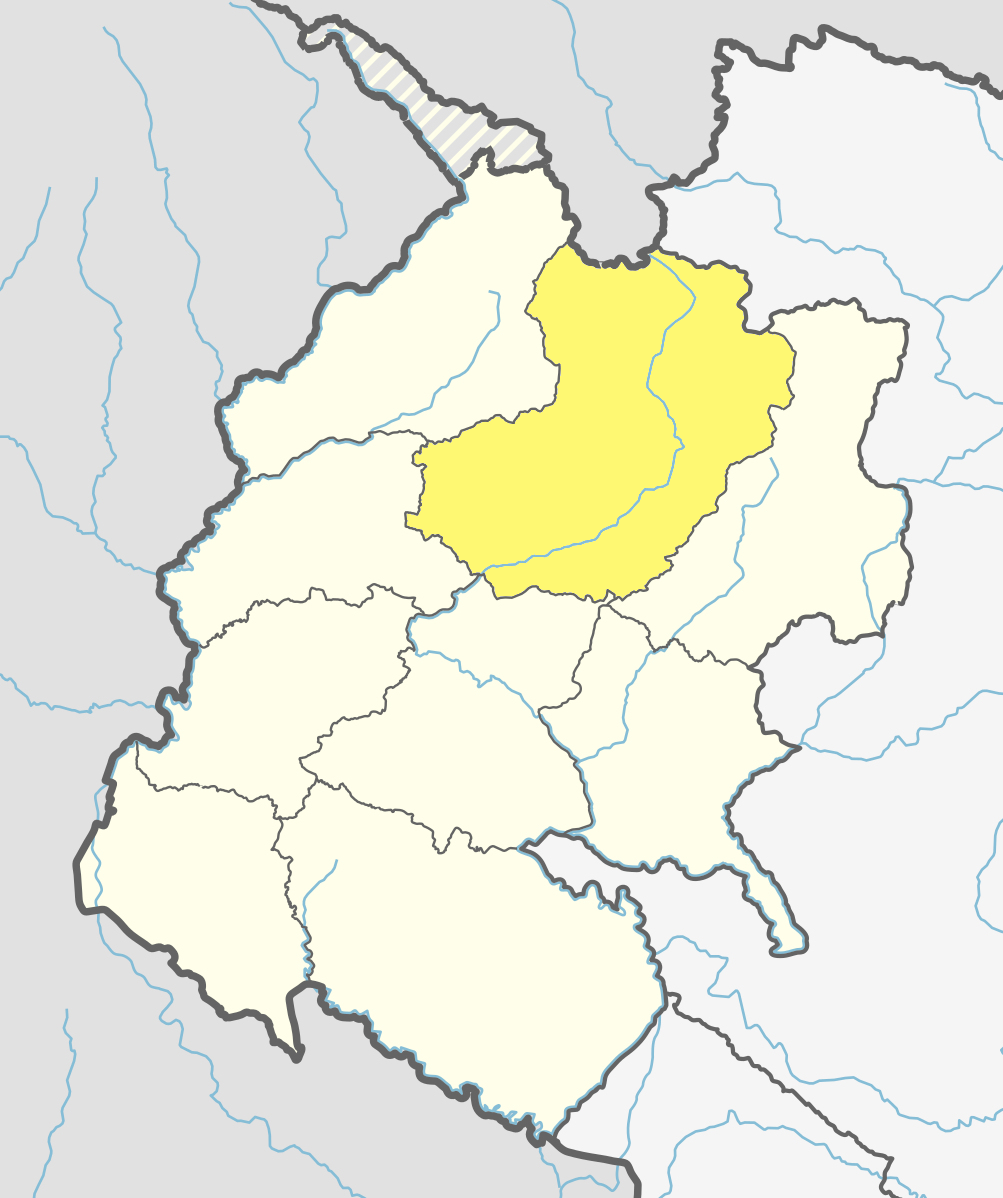
- Location of Bajhang District
- Country: Nepal
- Province: Sudurpashchim Province
- Admin HQ.: Chainpur (today part of Jaya Prithvi Municipality)

Government
  - Type: Coordination committee
  - Body: DCC, Bajhang

Area
  - Total: 3,422 km^{2} (1,321 sq mi)

Population (2011)
  - Total: 195,159
  - Density: 57.03/km^{2} (147.7/sq mi)
- Time zone: UTC+05:45 (NPT)
- Main Language(s): Bajhangi, Nepali

Bajhang District, a part of Sudurpashchim Province, is one of the seventy-seven districts of Nepal. The district, with Chainpur, that is part of Jaya Prithvi Municipality, as its district headquarters, covers an area of 3,422 km^{2} (1,321 sq mi) and has a population (2011) of 195,159. The headquarter Chainpur is situated at the bank of Seti River and Bauli Khola. Bitthad Bazar is bordered with Baitadi District which is the place of Bitthad Kalika and Kedar. This place was historically famous for fresh milk and yogurt.

== Geography and climate ==
The district is surrounded by Bajura and Humla in the East, Baitadi and Darchula in the West, Humla in the North and Doti and Achham in the South. The district is located between 29°29' and 30°09' north longitude, and 80°46' and 81°34 east latitude. The elevation of the district from sea level is 900 metres (3,000 ft) to 7,035 metres (23,081 ft).

Climate Zone	Elevation Range	% of Area
Upper Tropical	300 to 1,000 meters 1,000 to 3,300 ft.	0.5%
Subtropical	1,000 to 2,000 meters 3,300 to 6,600 ft.	18.0%
Temperate	2,000 to 3,000 meters 6,400 to 9,800 ft.	26.5%
Subalpine	3,000 to 4,000 meters 9,800 to 13,100 ft.	16.6%
Alpine	4,000 to 5,000 meters 13,100 to 16,400 ft.	8.4%
Nival	above 5,000 meters	30.0%

== Major religious spots ==
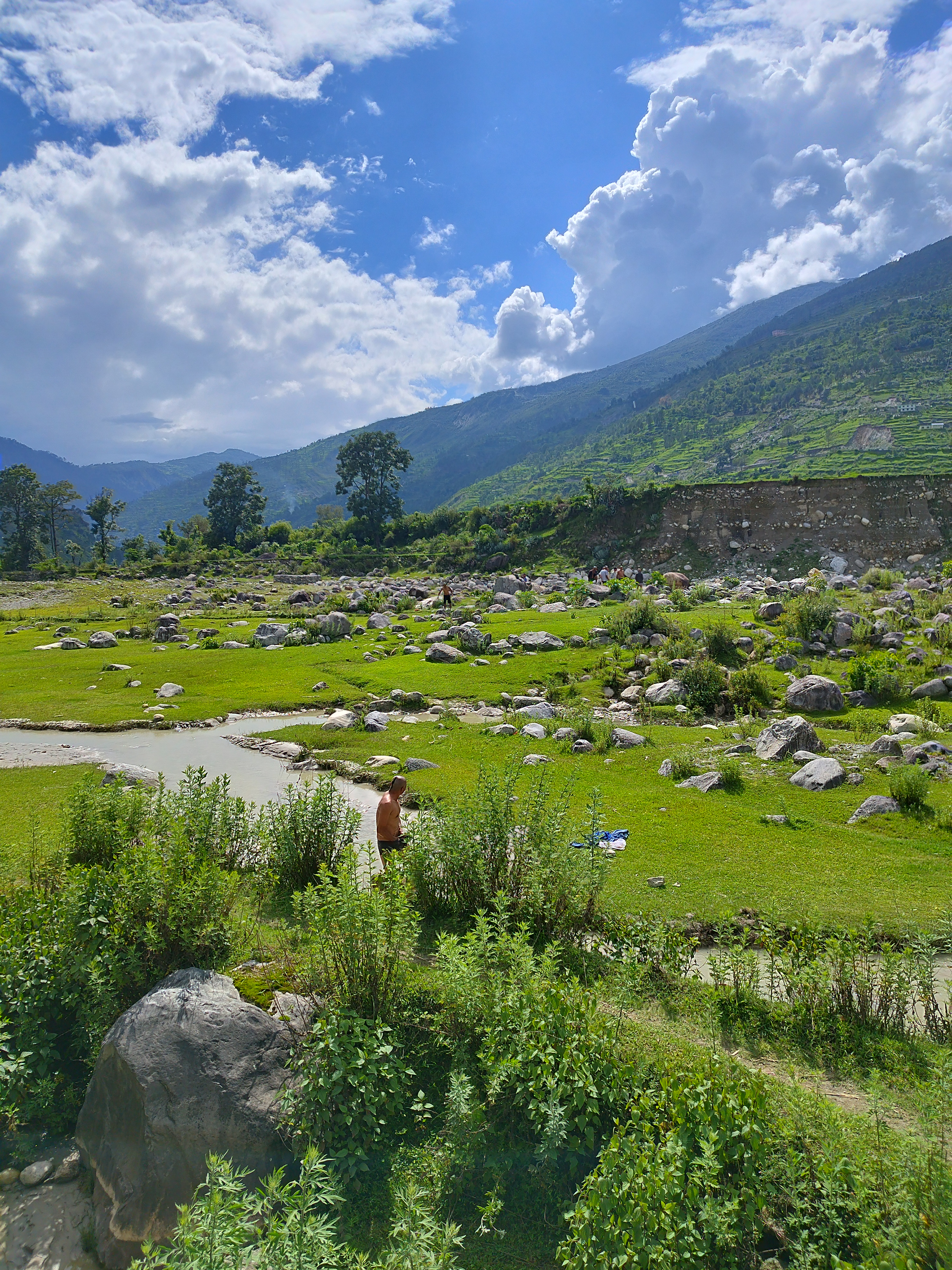
Seti Of Bajhang

- Bannimasta Mandir
- Kot darbar
- Jayaprithvi nagar darbar
- Khaptad Baba Mandir
- Devisthan Mandir, Chainpur (HQ of Bajhang District)
- Chuli Tika, Chabbis
- Ram mandir, Kada
- Surma Sarowar, Surma
- Khulmour Kedar Mandir (kedarnath)
- Thali, Durga thali Municipality
- Baddi jyaban, Purumchuli Siddanath, Bungle Municipality

== Demographics ==
Historical population
Census year	Pop.	±% p.a.
1981	124,010	—
1991	139,092	+1.15%
2001	167,026	+1.85%
2011	195,159	+1.57%
2021	189,097	−0.32%
Source: Citypopulation

At the time of the 2021 Nepal census, Bajhang District had a population of 189,085. 9.87% of the population is under 5 years of age. It has a literacy rate of 70.54% and a sex ratio of 1137 females per 1000 males. 55,745 (29.48%) lived in municipalities.

Castes/ethnic groups in Bajhang district (2021)
1. Chhetri (69.0%)
2. Kami (10.5%)
3. Bahun (9.04%)
4. Thakuri (4.78%)
5. Sarki (2.60%)
6. Damai (2.33%)
7. Dasnami (1.09%)
8. Others (0.68%)

Khas people make nearly the entire population. Chhetris make up 69% of the population, while Khas Dalits make up 15% of the population.

Languages of Bajhang district (2021)
1. Nepali (38.2%)
2. Bajhangi (37.6%)
3. Doteli (22.8%)
4. Others (1.39%)

At the time of the 2021 census, 38.17% of the population spoke Nepali, 37.63% Bajhangi and 22.81% Doteli as their first language. In 2011, 75.5% of the population spoke Nepali as their first language.

Hinduism is the predominant religion, practiced by 99.68% of the population.

== Administration ==
The district consists of twelve municipalities, out of which two are urban municipalities and ten are rural municipalities. These are as follows:

- Jaya Prithvi Municipality
- Bungal Municipality
- Talkot Rural Municipality
- Masta Rural Municipality
- Khaptadchhanna Rural Municipality
- Thalara Rural Municipality
- Bitthadchir Rural Municipality
- Surma Rural Municipality
- Chhabis Pathibhera Rural Municipality
- Durgathali Rural Municipality
- Kedarsyu Rural Municipality
- Saipal Rural Municipality

Prior to the restructuring of the district, Bajhang District consisted of the following municipalities and Village development committees:

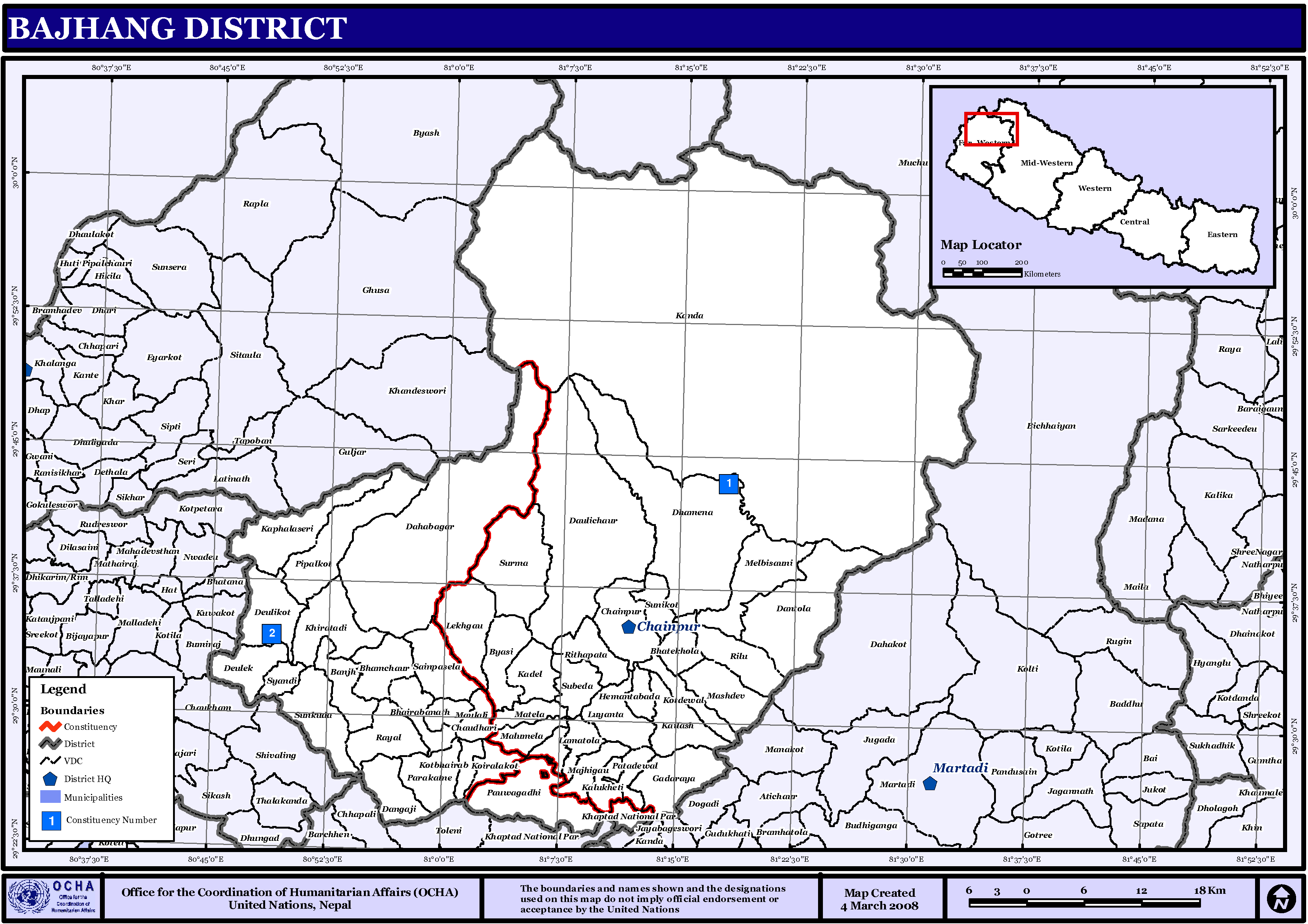
Map of the VDC/s in Bajhang District

- Banjh
- Bagthala
- Bhairabnath
- Bhamchaur
- Bhatekhola
- Byasi
- Chaudhari
- Dahabagar
- Dangaji
- Dantola
- Daulichaur
- Deulekh
- Deulikot
- Dhamena
- Gadaraya
- Jaya Prithvi Municipality
- Kadal
- Kailash
- Kalukheti
- Kanda
- Kaphalaseri
- Khiratadi
- Koiralakot
- Kot Bhairab
- Kotdewal
- Lamatola
- Lekhgaun
- Majhigaun
- Malumela
- Mashdev
- Matela
- Maulali
- Melbisauni
- Parakatne
- Patadewal
- Pauwagadhi
- Pitatola
- Pipalkot
- Rayal
- Rilu
- Sainpasela
- Sunikot
- Sunkuda
- Surma
- Syandi
- Thalara

== See also ==
- Kingdom of Bajhang
