= Durgathali Rural Municipality =

Durgathali Rural Municipality दुर्गाथली गाउँपालिका
- Rural Municipality
- दुर्गाथली गाउँपालिका
- Coordinates: 29.52906°N 81.0063°E
- Country: Nepal
- Province: Sudurpashchim Province
- District: Bajhang District

Government
  - Type: Local government

Area
  - Total: 61.83 km^{2} (23.87 sq mi)

Population (2011 census)
  - Total: 12,972
  - Density: 209.8/km^{2} (543.4/sq mi)
- Time zone: UTC+05:45 (Nepal Standard Time)
- Website: http://durgathalimun.gov.np

Durgathali (Nepali: दुर्गाथली) is a Gaupalika (Nepali: गाउपालिका, romanized: gaupalika) in Bajhang District in the Sudurpashchim Province of far-western Nepal. Durgathali has a population of 12972. The land area is 61.83 km^{2}.
