= Achham 2 =

Parliamentary constituency in Nepal

- Parliamentary constituency for the House of Representatives
- Achham 2 in Sudurpashchim Province; Protected areas in green

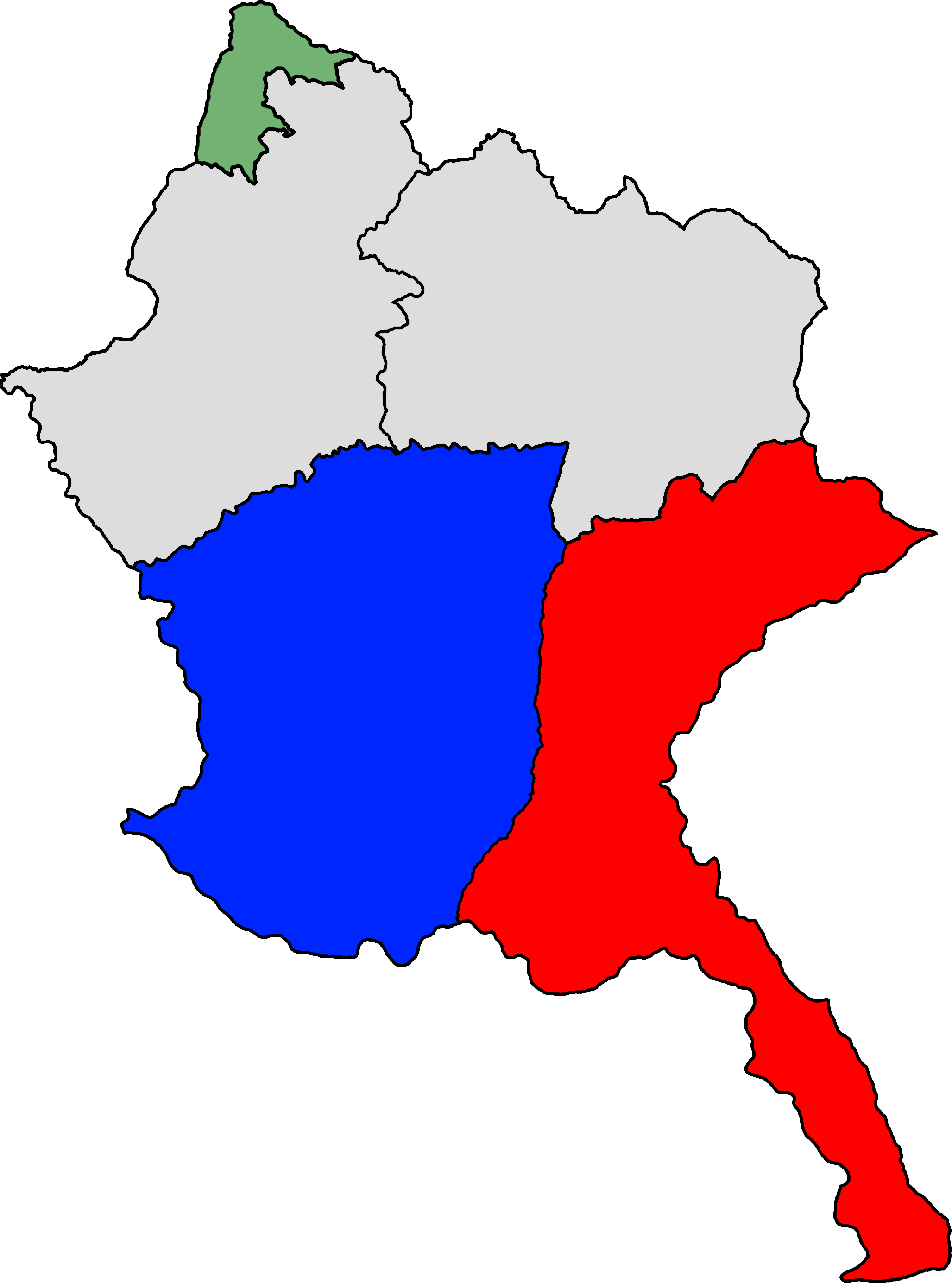
- Assembly segments Achham 2(A) (red) and Achham 2(B) (blue) within Achham District; Protected areas in green
- Province: Sudurpashchim Province
- District: Achham District
- Electorate: 68,310

Current constituency
- Created: 1991
- MP: Yagya Bahadur Bogati (CPN(UML))
- Sudurpashchim MPA 2(A): Akkal Bahadur Rawal (NCP)
- Sudurpashchim MPA 2(B): Man Bahadur Rawal (Congress)

Achham 2 is one of two parliamentary constituencies of Achham District in Nepal. This constituency came into existence on the Constituency Delimitation Commission (CDC) report submitted on 31 August 2017.

== Incorporated areas ==
Achham 2 incorporates Mangalsen Municipality, Kamalbazar Municipality, Panchadewal Binayak Municipality, Dhakari Rural Municipality, Turmakhad Rural Municipality.

== Assembly segments ==
It encompasses the following Sudurpashchim Provincial Assembly segment

- Achham 2(A)
- Achham 2(B)

== Members of Parliament ==
=== Parliament/Constituent Assembly ===
Election	Member	Party
1991	Gobinda Bahadur Shah	Nepali Congress
1994	Bhim Bahadur Kathayat	CPN (UML)
1999	Ram Bahadur Bista	Nepali Congress
2008	Sharad Singh Bhandari	CPN (Maoist)
January 2009	Sharad Singh Bhandari	UCPN (Maoist)
2013	Bharat Saud	CPN (UML)
2017	Yagya Bahadur Bogati	CPN (UML)
May 2018	Yagya Bahadur Bogati	Nepal Communist Party
March 2021	Yagya Bahadur Bogati	CPN (UML)
2022	Pushpa Bahadur Shah	Nepali Congress
2026	Yagya Bahadur Bogati	CPN (UML)

=== Provincial Assembly ===
==== 2(A) ====
Election	Member	Party
2017	Akkal Bahadur Rawal	CPN (Maoist Centre)
May 2018	Akkal Bahadur Rawal	Nepal Communist Party

==== 2(B) ====
Election	Member	Party
2017	Bal Bahadur Sodari	CPN (Unified Marxist-Leninist)
May 2018	Bal Bahadur Sodari	Nepal Communist Party
March 2021	Bal Bahadur Sodari	CPN (Unified Marxist–Leninist)
August 2021	Bal Bahadur Sodari	CPN (Unified Socialist)

== Election results ==
=== Election in the 2020s ===
==== 2026 general election ====
Candidate	Party	Votes	%
Yagya Bahadur Bogati	CPN (UML)	9,518	31.14
Pushpa Bahadur Shah	Nepali Congress	9,046	29.59
Bal Bahadur Kunwar	Nepali Communist Party	6,493	21.24
Bhup Dev Shah	Rastriya Swatantra Party	4,562	14.92
Others		950	3.11
Total		30,569	100.00
Majority		472	
CPN (UML) gain			

==== 2022 general election ====
Candidate	Party	Votes	%
Pushpa Bahadur Shah	Nepali Congress	22,954	57.71
Yagya Bahadur Bogati	CPN (UML)	16,114	40.51
Others		705	1.77
Total		39,773	100.00
Majority		6,840	
Nepali Congress gain			

=== Election in the 2010s ===
==== 2017 legislative elections ====
Party	Candidate	Votes
CPN (Unified Marxist–Leninist)	Yagya Bahadur Bogati	21,965
Nepali Congress	Pushpa Bahadur Shah	19,103
Nepal Workers Peasants Party	Jhankar Bahadur Shahi	173
Invalid votes		1,650
Result	CPN (UML) hold	
Source: Election Commission

==== 2017 Nepalese provincial elections ====
===== 2(A) =====
Party	Candidate	Votes
CPN (Maoist Centre)	Akkal Bahadur Rawal	10,981
Nepali Congress	Surat Bahadur Bista	9,040
Others		425
Invalid votes		1,125
Result	Maoist Centre gain	
Source: Election Commission

===== 2(B) =====
Party	Candidate	Votes
CPN (Unified Marxist-Leninist)	Bal Bahadur Sodari	10,816
Nepali Congress	Bal Bahadur Kunwar	9,837
Invalid votes		690
Result	CPN (UML) gain	
Source: Election Commission

==== 2013 Constituent Assembly election ====
Party	Candidate	Votes
CPN (Unified Marxist–Leninist)	Bharat Saud	17,725
Nepali Congress	Bal Bahadur Kunwar	12,968
UCPN (Maoist)	Jhankar Bahadur Rawal	10,967
CPN (Marxist–Leninist)	Bam Bahadur B.C.	1,246
Others		1,629
Result	CPN (UML) gain	
Source: NepalNews

=== Election in the 2000s ===
==== 2008 Constituent Assembly election ====
Party	Candidate	Votes
CPN (Maoist)	Sharad Singh Bhandari	17,976
CPN (Unified Marxist–Leninist)	Shiva Prasad Upadhyaya	14,171
Nepali Congress	Ram Bahadur Bista	10,442
CPN (Marxist–Leninist)	Jagat Bahadur Bogati	5,134
Rastriya Prajatantra Party	Bhim Bahadur Bista	1,303
Others		1,527
Invalid votes		3,043
Result	Maoist gain	
Source: Election Commission

=== Election in the 1990s ===
==== 1999 legislative elections ====
Party	Candidate	Votes
Nepali Congress	Ram Bahadur Bista	19,523
CPN (Unified Marxist–Leninist)	Bharat Saud	11,740
CPN (Marxist–Leninist)	Jhanker Bahadur Rawal	7,989
Rastriya Prajatantra Party	Ram Bahadur Shahi	4,595
Rastriya Prajatantra Party (Chand)	Dinesh Kumar Shahi	243
Invalid votes		1,156
Result	Congress gain	
Source: Election Commission

==== 1994 legislative elections ====
Party	Candidate	Votes
CPN (Unified Marxist–Leninist)	Bhim Bahadur Kathayat	12,797
Nepali Congress	Ram Bahadur Bista	10,733
Rastriya Prajatantra Party	Mahajit Sawat	7,896
Independent	Harihar Prasad Adhikari	1,713
Independent	Bhairav Singh Rawal	773
Result	CPN (UML) gain	
Source: Election Commission

==== 1991 legislative elections ====
Party	Candidate	Votes
Nepali Congress	Gobinda Bahadur Shah	11,026
CPN (Unified Marxist–Leninist)		9,657
Result	Congress gain	

== See also ==
- List of parliamentary constituencies of Nepal
