= Achham 1 =

Parliamentary constituency in Nepal

- Parliamentary constituency for the House of Representatives
- Achham 1 in Sudurpashchim Province; Protected areas in green

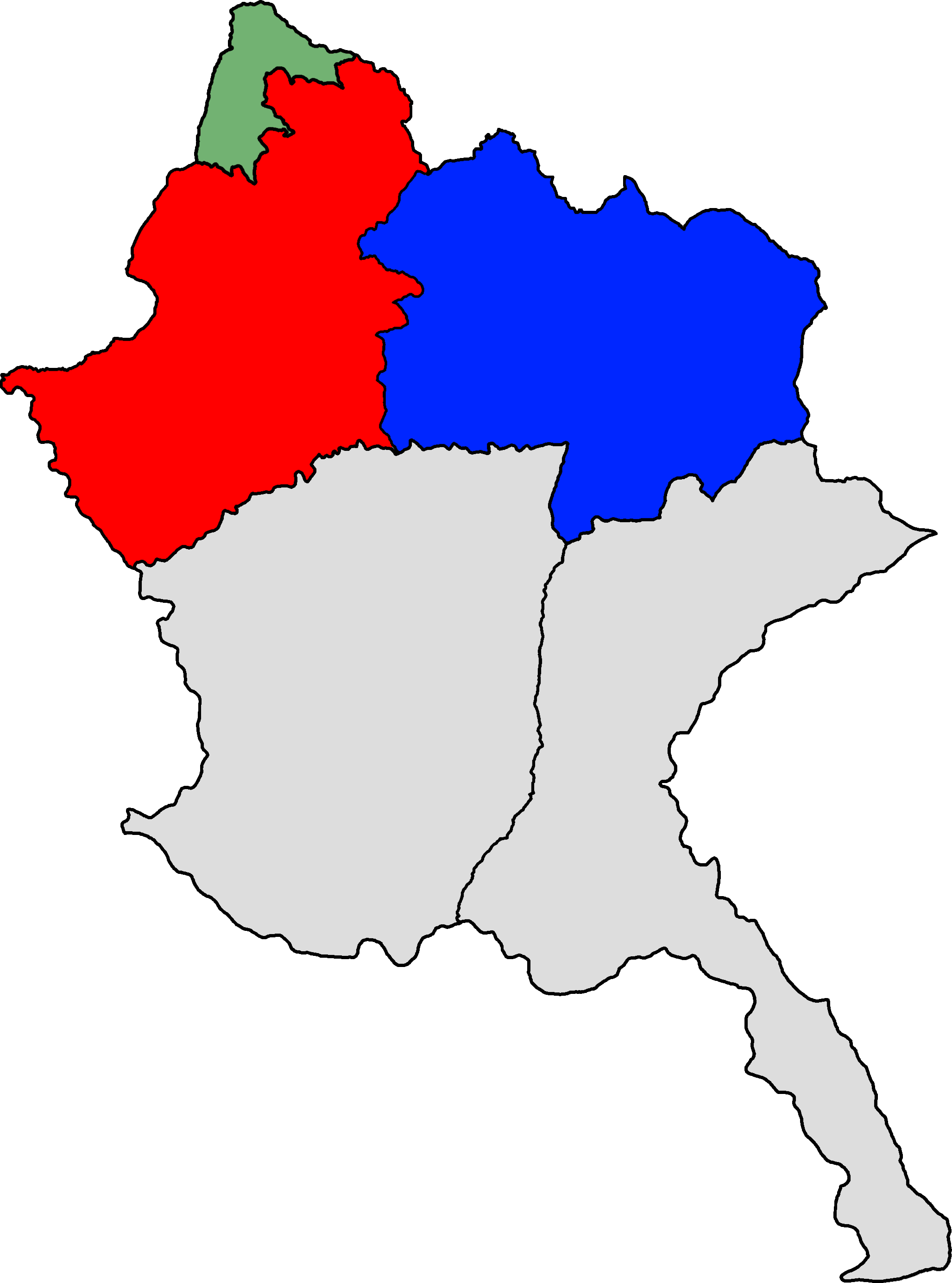
- Assembly segments Achham 1(A) (red) and Achham 1(B) (blue) within Achham District; Protected areas in green
- Province: Sudurpashchim Province
- District: Achham District
- Electorate: 68,593

Current constituency
- Created: 1991
- MP: Bharat Kumar Swar (Congress)
- Sudurpashchim MPA 1(A): Megh Raj Khadka
- Sudurpashchim MPA 1(B): Jhapat Bahadur Saud

Achham 1 is one of two parliamentary constituencies of Achham District in Nepal. This constituency came into existence on the Constituency Delimitation Commission (CDC) report submitted on 31 August 2017.

== Incorporated areas ==
Achham 1 incorporates Sanphebagar Municipality, Mellekh Rural Municipality, Chaurpati Rural Municipality, Bannigadhi Jayagadh Rural Municipality and Ramaroshan Rural Municipality.

== Assembly segments ==
It encompasses the following Sudurpashchim Provincial Assembly segment

- Achham 1(A)
- Achham 1(B)

== Members of Parliament ==
=== Parliament/Constituent Assembly ===
Election	Member	Party
1991	Bal Bahadur Kunwar	Nepali Congress
1994	Bhim Bahadur Rawal	CPN (UML)
1999	Gobinda Bahadur Shah	Nepali Congress
2008	Sher Bahadur Kunwor	CPN (UML)
2013	Bhim Bahadur Rawal	CPN (UML)
May 2018	Bhim Bahadur Rawal	Nepal Communist Party
March 2021	Bhim Bahadur Rawal	CPN (UML)
2022	Sher Bahadur Kunwor	CPN (Unified Socialist)
2026	Bharat Kumar Swar	Nepali Congress

=== Provincial Assembly ===
==== 1(A) ====
Election	Member	Party
2017	Harka Bahadur Kunwar	CPN (UML)
May 2018	Harka Bahadur Kunwar	Nepal Communist Party
March 2021	Harka Bahadur Kunwar	CPN (UML)
2022	Megh Raj Khadka	Nepali Congress

==== 1(B) ====
Election	Member	Party
2017	Jhapat Bahadur Bohora	CPN (Maoist Centre)
May 2018	Jhapat Bahadur Bohora	Nepal Communist Party
March 2021	Jhapat Bahadur Bohora	CPN (Maoist Centre)
2022	Jhapat Bahadur Saud	CPN (Maoist Centre)

== Election results ==
=== Election in the 2020s ===
==== 2026 general election ====
Candidate	Party	Votes	%
Bharat Kumar Swar	Nepali Congress	10,759	35.45
Bhim Bahadur Rawal	Nepali Communist Party	10,233	33.72
Deepak Bahadur Saud	CPN (UML)	7,389	24.35
Others		1,967	6.48
Total		30,348	100.00
Majority		526	
Nepali Congress gain			

==== 2022 general election ====
Candidate	Party	Votes	%
Sher Bahadur Kunwor	CPN (Unified Socialist)	19,534	49.56
Jhapat Bahadur Bohara	CPN (UML)	15,045	38.17
Rajan Kunwar	Independent	4,392	11.14
Others		444	1.13
Total		39,415	100.00
Majority		4,489	
CPN (Unified Socialist) gain			

==== 2022 provincial election ====
===== 1(A) =====
Candidate	Party	Votes	%
Megh Raj Khadka	Nepali Congress	12,337	65.50
Dev Bahadur Kunwar	CPN (UML)	6,497	34.50
Total		18,834	100.00
Nepali Congress gain			

===== 1(B) =====
Candidate	Party	Votes	%
Jhapat Bahadur Saud	CPN (Maoist Centre)	12,115	57.32
Krishna Prasad Jaishi	CPN (UML)	9,019	42.68
Total		21,134	100.00
CPN (Maoist Centre) hold			

=== Election in the 2010s ===
==== 2017 general elections ====
Candidate	Party	Votes	%
Bhim Bahadur Rawal	CPN (UML)	24,893	58.46
Bharat Kumar Swar	Nepali Congress	17,689	41.54
Total		42,582	100.00
Valid votes		42,582	97.04
Invalid/blank votes		1,298	2.96
Total votes		43,880	100.00
Majority		7,204	
CPN (UML) hold			
Source: Election Commission

==== 2017 Nepalese provincial elections ====
===== 1(A) =====
Candidate	Party	Votes	%
Harka Bahadur Kunwar	CPN (UML)	10,710	53.53
Megh Raj Khadka	Nepali Congress	9,298	46.47
Total		20,008	100.00
Valid votes		20,008	97.74
Invalid/blank votes		463	2.26
Total votes		20,471	100.00
Majority		1,412	
CPN (UML) gain			
Source: Election Commission

===== 1(B) =====
Candidate	Party	Votes	%
Jhapat Bahadur Bohora	CPN (Maoist Centre)	13,937	62.05
Tek Bahadur Saud	Nepali Congress	8,340	37.13
Krishna Bahadur Khatri	Patriotic People's Republican Front, Nepal	185	0.82
Total		22,462	100.00
Valid votes		22,462	96.58
Invalid/blank votes		796	3.42
Total votes		23,258	100.00
Majority		5,597	
CPN (Maoist Centre) gain			
Source: Election Commission

==== 2013 Constituent Assembly election ====
Candidate	Party	Votes	%
Bhim Bahadur Rawal	CPN (UML)	17,725	41.77
Megh Raj Khadka	Nepali Congress	12,968	30.56
Deepak Bahadur Saud	UCPN (Maoist)	10,967	25.85
Others		773	1.82
Total		42,433	100.00
Valid votes		42,433	50.00
Invalid/blank votes		42,433	50.00
Total votes		84,866	100.00
Registered voters/turnout		56,574	150.01
Majority		4,757	
CPN (UML) hold			
Source: Election Commission

=== Election in the 2000s ===
==== 2008 Constituent Assembly election ====
Candidate	Party	Votes	%
Sher Bahadur Kunwor	CPN (UML)	21,631	40.83
Jhapat Bahadur Saud	CPN (Maoist)	16,468	31.09
Gobinda Bahadur Shah	Nepali Congress	13,454	25.40
Others		1,423	2.69
Total		52,976	100.00
Valid votes		52,976	95.67
Invalid/blank votes		2,400	4.33
Total votes		55,376	100.00
Registered voters/turnout		97,149	57.00
Majority		5,163	
CPN (UML) gain			
Source: Election Commission

=== Election in the 1990s ===
==== 1999 general elections ====
Candidate	Party	Votes	%
Gobinda Bahadur Shah	Nepali Congress	27,690	50.31
Bhim Bahadur Rawal	CPN (UML)	23,457	42.62
Jaya Bahadur Saud	Rastriya Prajatantra Party	1,839	3.34
Gokul Prasad Khanal	CPN (Marxist–Leninist)	1,768	3.21
Others		287	0.52
Total		55,041	100.00
Valid votes		55,041	97.84
Invalid/blank votes		1,215	2.16
Total votes		56,256	100.00
Registered voters/turnout		84,666	66.44
Majority		4,233	
Nepali Congress gain			
Source: Election Commission

==== 1994 general elections ====
Candidate	Party	Votes	%
Bhim Bahadur Rawal	CPN (UML)	18,060	43.03
Gobinda Bahadur Shah	Nepali Congress	13,059	31.12
Bal Bahadur Kunwar	Independent	7,657	18.24
Janak Bahadur Shah	Rastriya Prajatantra Party	2,865	6.83
Takta Sunar	Independent	329	0.78
Total		41,970	100.00
Majority		5,001	
CPN (UML) gain			
Source: Election Commission

==== 1991 general elections ====
Candidate	Party	Votes	%
Bal Bahadur Kunwar	Nepali Congress	11,855	61.59
Bhim Kadayat	CPN (UML)	7,392	38.41
Total		19,247	100.00
Majority		4,463	
Nepali Congress gain			

== See also ==
- List of parliamentary constituencies of Nepal
