= Baujinath =

Coordinates: 29°12′28″N 81°12′00″E

Baijanath बैजनाथ
- Interactive map of Baijanath
- Country: Nepal
- Zone: Seti Zone
- District: Achham District

Population (2001)
  - Total: 1,345
  - Religions: Hindu
- Time zone: UTC+5:45 (Nepal Time)

Baijinath is a business center in Sanfebagar Municipality in Achham District in the Seti Zone of western Nepal. It was annexed to form the new municipality since 18 May 2014. According to the 1991 Nepal census, the village had a population of 1160 living in 237 houses. At the time of the 2001 Nepal census, the population was 1345, of which 70% was literate.
