= Marku (village) =

Marku मार्कु
- Village development committee
- Location in Nepal
- Coordinates: 29.24°N 81.14°E
- Country: Nepal
- Zone: Sudurpashchim Province
- District: Achham District
- Rural municipality: Chaurpati Rural Municipality

Population (2001)
  - Total: 2,058
  - Religions: Hindu
- Time zone: UTC+5:45 (Nepal Time)

Marku is a village in the Chaurpati Rural Municipality of Achham District in the Sudurpashchim Province of western Nepal. At the time of the 1991 Nepal census the village had a population of 1855 living in 413 houses. At the time of the 2001 Nepal census, the population was 2058 of which 41% was literate. In Marku there is a most popular temple which called "Shri Shannikot Bajrayogini Maai"Now (2023 AD) Marku is a ward of Chaurpati Rural Municipality . Pauwabazar, Birkhamma and Malikasthaan are the small market areas of Marku.
