= Lungra =

Lungra लुङगरा
- Village development committee
- Location in Nepal
- Coordinates: 29.21°N 81.16°E
- Country: Nepal
- Province: Sudurpashchim Province
- District: Achham District
- Rural municipality: Chaurpati Rural Municipality

Population (2001)
  - Total: 4,062
  - Religions: Hindu
- Time zone: UTC+5:45 (Nepal Time)

Lungra is a village in the Chaurpati Rural Municipality of Achham District in the Sudurpashchim Province of western Nepal. At the time of the 1991 Nepal census, the village had a population of 3515 living in 714 houses. At the time of the 2001 Nepal census, the population was 4062, of which 36% was literate.
