= Pahalman Singh Swar =

Nepalese dramatist (1878 - 1934)

- पहलमान सिंह स्वाँर
- Born: November 1878; Achham, Nepal
- Died: May 1934 (aged 55); Kailali, Nepal
- Occupation: Dramatist
- Parents: Deekura Devi (mother); Laxmi Singh Swar (father)

Pahalman Singh Swar (Nepali: पहलमान सिंह स्वाँर) was a Nepalese dramatist. He is best known for his play called Atal Bahadur which was published in 1905.

== Early life ==
He was born in November, 1878 in Ridikot, Achham District, Nepal to father Laxmi Singh Swar and mother Deekura Devi. Due to the lack of formal education in Accham during that period, Swar was taught Nepali and Sanskrit texts at home. He also read books in English and Hindi languages. His father was a government contractor and he incurred a major loss in 1895. When the then prime minister of Nepal decreed that every contractor should pay fifty thousand rupees to their share of contract, his father discontinued the work. His father and his elder brother were subsequently arrested and their housed was seized by the government.

He then fled to India and took refuge in a place called Singahi under the care of Queen Surat Kumari. There he founded L.P. Swaar Company, a clothes trading business. He also trained in weaving in Gujrat in 1905 inspired from the textile industries there.

== Later life ==
He wrote four of his best well known books - Premamrit Bachan Sangraha, Ankendu Shekhar, Atal Bahadur and Anadaraj in India. He returned to Kathmandu and established various businesses but failed in most of them. He was also jailed multiple times of false allegations. Finally, he then returned back to Kailali and settled there.

His works include Atal Bahadur (1905), and Abhijnanasakuntalam, Ankendrashekhar. Some of his works were banned for his anti-Rana sentiment.

Swar died in May 1934 in Kailali District, Nepal.

== Honors ==
Ratna Pustakalaya's library's courtyard in Kathmandu includes a bust of Pahalman Singh Swar. In 1980, the Government of Nepal issued a postage stamp featuring Swar.

A library in his name - Pahalman library has been opened in Kailali district. A highway connecting Dipayal, Doti to Sanfebagar in Achham district is named after him as Pahalman Singh Highway.

Pahalman Singh Swar Memorial Foundation was established in his honor. Every year the foundation confers the following awards:

- Pahalman Singh Swar Lifetime Literary Award
- Pahalman Singh Swar Genius Award
- Taraman Ambika Devi Swar Education Award
- Balman Singh Swar Film Award

== See also ==
- Bhanubhakta Acharya
- Lekhnath Paudyal
- Motiram Bhatta
