= Sakot =

Coordinates: 29°11′N 81°05′E

Sakot साकोट
- Village development committee
- Interactive map of Sakot
- Country: Nepal
- Province: Sudurpashchim Province
- District: Achham District
- Rural municipality: Chaurpati Rural Municipality

Population (2001)
  - Total: 5,843
  - Religions: Hindu
- Time zone: UTC+5:45 (Nepal Time)

Sakot is a small town in the Chaurpati Rural Municipality of Achham District in the Sudurpashchim Province of western Nepal. At the time of the 1991 Nepal census, the town had a population of 5195 living in 1113 houses. At the time of the 2001 Nepal census, the population was 5843, of which 24% was literate.
