= Janalibandali =

Janalibandali जनालीबण्डाली
- Former Village Development Committee
- Location in Nepal
- Coordinates: 29.09°N 81.28°E
- Country: Nepal
- Province: Sudurpashchim
- District: Achham
- Municipality: Mangalsen

Population (2001)
  - Total: 2,913
  - Religions: Hindu
- Time zone: UTC+5:45 (Nepal Time)

Janalibandali is a market center in Mangalsen municipality in Achham District in the Sudurpashchim Province of western Nepal. The municipality was established merging with existing Janalibandali, Kuntibandali, Oligau, Jupu, Kalagaun and Mangalsen village development committees (VDCs) on 18 May 2014. At the time of the 2001 Nepal census, the population was 2,913, of whom 22% were literate.
