= Rahaph =

Rahaph रहफ तल्लो डुङ्गेश्वर, दैलेख पारी
- Village development committee
- Location in Nepal
- Coordinates: 28.82°N 81.52°E
- Country: Nepal
- Zone: Seti Zone
- District: Achham District

Population (2001)
  - Total: 3,457
  - Religions: Hindu
- Time zone: UTC+5:45 (Nepal Time)

Rahaph is a village in Achham District in the Seti Zone of western Nepal. At the time of the 1991 Nepal census, the village had a population of 2748 living in 558 houses. At the time of the 2001 Nepal census, the population was 3457, of which only 9% was literate.

By Yagya Bahadur Rawal-Rapal
