= Baradadivi =

Baradadivi बरदादिभी
- Village development committee
- Location in Nepal
- Coordinates: 29.21°N 81.29°E
- Country: Nepal
- Zone: Seti Zone
- District: Achham District

Population (2001)
  - Total: 3,857
  - Religions: Hindu
- Time zone: UTC+5:45 (Nepal Time)

Baradadivi is a village development committee in Achham District in the Seti Zone of western Nepal. According to the 1991 Nepal census, it has a population of 3314 and had 644 houses in the village. At the time of the 2001 Nepal census, the population was 3857, of which 45% was literate. The population is entirely Hindu.
