= Nandegata =

Coordinates: 29°14′N 81°17′E

Nandegata नन्देगाता
- Village development committee
- Interactive map of Nandegata
- Country: Nepal
- Zone: Seti Zone
- District: Achham District

Population (2001)
  - Total: 3,356
  - Religions: Hindu
- Time zone: UTC+5:45 (Nepal Time)

Nandegata is a village in Achham District in the Seti Zone of western Nepal. At the time of the 1991 Nepal census, the village had a population of 2881 living in 542 houses. At the time of the 2001 Nepal census, the population was 3356, of which 33% was literate.
