= Khodasadevi =

Shodasadevi शोडषादेवी Shodasadevi
- Village development committee
- Location in Nepal
- Coordinates: 29.25°N 81.34°E
- Country: Nepal
- Zone: Seti Zone
- District: Achham District

Population (2001)
  - Total: 3,434
  - Religions: Hindu
- Time zone: UTC+5:45 (Nepal Time)

Shodasadevi is a village in Achham District in the Seti Zone of western Nepal. At the time of the 1991 Nepal census, the village had a population of 2913 living in 573 houses. At the time of the 2001 Nepal census, the population was 3434, of which 36% was literate.
