= Santada =

Santada सान्तडा
- Village development committee
- Location in Nepal
- Coordinates: 29.17°N 81.40°E
- Country: Nepal
- Zone: Seti Zone
- District: Achham District

Population (2001)
  - Total: 2,437
  - Religions: Hindu
- Time zone: UTC+5:45 (Nepal Time)

Santada is a village in Achham District in the Seti Zone of western Nepal. The 1991 Nepal census estimated the village to have a population of 1,980 residents in 382 houses. The 2001 Nepal census estimated a population of 2,437, of which 27% was literate.
