= Siudi =

Siudi सिउँडी
- Former Village Development Committee
- Location in Nepal
- Coordinates: 29.15°N 81.11°E
- Country: Nepal
- Province: Sudurpashchim Province
- District: Achham District
- Part of: Chaurpati Rural Municipality

Population (2001)
  - Total: 4,533
  - Religions: Hindu
- Time zone: UTC+5:45 (Nepal Time)

Siudi is a small town in the Chaurpati Rural Municipality of Achham District in the Sudurpashchim Province of western Nepal. At the time of the 1991 Nepal census, the town had a population of 3744 living in 816 houses. At the time of the 2001 Nepal census, the population was 4533, of which 21% was literate.
