= Chapamandau =

Coordinates: 29°10′N 81°23′E

Chaphamandau छापमाडौं
- Village development committee
- Interactive map of Chaphamandau
- Country: Nepal
- Zone: Seti Zone
- District: Achham District

Population (2001)
  - Total: 1,188
  - Religions: Hindu
- Time zone: UTC+5:45 (Nepal Time)

Chapamandau is a village in Achham District in the Seti Zone of western Nepal. At the time of the 1991 Nepal census, the village had a population of 1073 living in 211 houses.

== Demographics ==
At the time of the 2001 Nepal census, the population was 1188, of which 51% was literate.
