= Kuika =

Kuika कुइका
- Former Village Development Committee
- Location in Nepal
- Coordinates: 29.09°N 81.37°E
- Country: Nepal
- Province: Sudurpashchim Province
- District: Achham District
- Part of: split between Kamalbazar Municipality & Panchadewal Binayak Municipality

Government

Population (2001)
  - Total: 3,881
  - Religions: Hindu
- Time zone: UTC+5:45 (Nepal Time)

Kuika is a small town in Achham District in the Sudurpashchim Province of western Nepal. At the time of the 1991 Nepal census, the town had a population of 3448 living in 667 houses. At the time of the 2001 Nepal census, the population was 3881, of which 36% was literate. Later this VDC was split and merged to Kamalbazar Municipality and Panchadewal Binayak Municipality.
