= Dhodasain =

Ghodasain घोडासैन
- Village development committee
- Location in Nepal
- Coordinates: 29.02°N 81.31°E
- Country: Nepal
- Zone: Seti Zone
- District: Achham District

Population (2001)
  - Total: 4,421
  - Religions: Hindu
- Time zone: UTC+5:45 (Nepal Time)

Ghodasain is a village in Achham District in the Seti Zone of western Nepal. At the time of the 1991 Nepal census, the village had a population of 3716 living in 682 houses. At the time of the 2001 Nepal census, the population was 4421, of which 32% was literate.
