= Batulasen =

Batulasen बाटुलासेन
- Village development committee
- Location in Nepal
- Coordinates: 29.17°N 81.44°E
- Country: Nepal
- Zone: Seti Zone
- District: Achham District

Population (2001)
  - Total: 3,587
  - Religions: Hindu
- Time zone: UTC+5:45 (Nepal Time)

Batulasen is a small town in Achham District in the Seti Zone of western Nepal. According to the 1991 Nepal census, the village had a population of 3053 living in 592 houses. At the time of the 2001 Nepal census, the population was 3587, of which 37% was literate.
