= Kalekanda =

Kalekanda कालेकाँडा
- Former Village Development Committee
- Location in Nepal
- Coordinates: 29.12°N 81.52°E
- Country: Nepal
- Province: Sudurpashchim Province
- District: Achham District
- Part of: Panchadewal Binayak Municipality

Population (2001)
  - Total: 2,667
  - Religions: Hindu
- Time zone: UTC+5:45 (Nepal Time)

Kalekanda is a village in Achham District in the Seti Zone of western Nepal. At the time of the 1991 Nepal census, the village had a population of 2216 living in 379 houses. At the time of the 2001 Nepal census, the population was 2667, of which 24% was literate.
