= Layati =

Layati ल्याति
- Former Village Development Committee
- Location in Nepal
- Coordinates: 29.08°N 81.44°E
- Country: Nepal
- Province: Sudurpashchim Province
- District: Achham District
- Part of: Panchadewal Binayak Municipality

Population (2001)
  - Total: 2,115
  - Religions: Hindu
- Time zone: UTC+5:45 (Nepal Time)

Layati is a village in Achham District in the Seti Zone of western Nepal. At the time of the 1991 Nepal census, the village had a population of 1776 living in 336 houses. At the time of the 2001 Nepal census, the population was 2115, of which 32% was literate.
