= Dhungachalna =

Dhungachalna ढुंगाछल्ना
- Village development committee
- Location in Nepal
- Coordinates: 28.95°N 81.27°E
- Country: Nepal
- Zone: Seti Zone
- District: Achham District

Population (2001)
  - Total: 4,617
  - Religions: Hindu
- Time zone: UTC+5:45 (Nepal Time)

Dhungachalna is a village in Achham District in the Seti Zone of western Nepal. At the time of the 1991 Nepal census, the village had a population of 3646 living in 676 houses. At the time of the 2001 Nepal census, the population was 4617, of which 16% was literate.
