= Janalikot =

Janalikot जनालीकोट
- Former Village Development Committee
- Location in Nepal
- Coordinates: 29.19°N 81.26°E
- Country: Nepal
- Province: Sudurpashchim Province
- District: Achham District
- Part of: Bannigadi Jayagad Rural Municipality

Population (2001)
  - Total: 2,017
  - Religions: Hindu
- Time zone: UTC+5:45 (Nepal Time)

Janalikot is ward no. 2 of Bannigadi Jayagad Rural Municipality in Achham District in Sudurpashchim Province of western Nepal. At the time of the 1991 Nepal census, the village had a population of 1772 living in 387 houses. At the time of the 2001 Nepal census, the population was 2017, of which 48% was literate.
