= Dhudharukot =

GhuGhurkot घुघुरकोट
- Village development committee
- Location in Nepal
- Coordinates: 29.28°N 81.23°E
- Country: Nepal
- Zone: Seti Zone
- District: Achham District

Population (2001)
  - Total: 3,211
  - Religions: Hindu
- Time zone: UTC+5:45 (Nepal Time)

GHUGHURKOT is a village in Achham District in the Seti Zone of western Nepal. At the time of the 1991 Nepal census, the village had a population of 2778 living in 601 houses. By the time of the 2001 Nepal census, the population had grown to 3211, of whom 40% were literate.
