= Mashtabandali =

Coordinates: 29°2′N 81°18′E

Mashtabandali मष्टाबण्डाली
- Former Village Development Committee
- Location in Nepal
- Country: Nepal
- Province: Sudurpashchim Province
- District: Achham District
- Part of: Kamalbazar Municipality

Population (2001)
  - Total: 2,004
  - Religions: Hindu
- Time zone: UTC+5:45 (Nepal Time)

Mashtabandali is a former Village development committee in Achham District in the Sudurpashchim Province of western Nepal. At the time of the 1991 Nepal census, the village had a population of 1995 living in 350 houses. At the time of the 2001 Nepal census, the population was 2004, of which 31% was literate. Mashtanamdali now is part of Kamalbazar Municipality which was established in 2014.
