= Bhagyeshwar =

Coordinates: 29°12′N 81°14′E

Bhagyeshwar भाग्येश्वर
- Former Village Development Committee
- Interactive map of Bhagyeshwar
- Country: Nepal
- Province: Sudurpashchim Province
- District: Achham District
- Part of: Sanphebagar Municipality

Population (2001)
  - Total: 1,321
  - Religions: Hindu
- Time zone: UTC+5:45 (Nepal Time)

Bhagyeshwar is a business center in Sanphebagar Municipality in Achham District in the Sudurpashchim Province of western Nepal. It was annexed to form the new municipality since 18 May 2014. According to the 1991 Nepal census, the village had a population of 1158 living in 257 houses. At the time of the 2001 Nepal census, the population was 1321, of which 62% was literate.
