= Mastamandau =

Mastamandau माष्टामाडौं
- Former Village Development Committee
- Location in Nepal
- Coordinates: 29.25°N 81.24°E
- Country: Nepal
- Province: Sudurpashchim Province
- District: Achham District
- Part of: Sanphebagar Municipality

Population (2001)
  - Total: 3,411
  - Religions: Hindu
- Time zone: UTC+5:45 (Nepal Time)

Mastamandau is a business center in Sanphebagar Municipality in Achham District in the Sudurpashchim Province of western Nepal. It was annexed to form the new municipality since 18 May 2014. At the time of the 1991 Nepal census, the village had a population of 2633 living in 547 houses. At the time of the 2001 Nepal census, the population was 3411, of which 51% was literate.
