= Gajara =

Gajara गजरा
- Village development committee
- Location in Nepal
- Coordinates: 29.21°N 81.26°E
- Country: Nepal
- Zone: Seti Zone
- District: Achham District

Population (2001)
  - Total: 1,710
  - Religions: Hindu
- Time zone: UTC+5:45 (Nepal Time)

Gajara is a village in Achham District in the Seti Zone of western Nepal. At the time of the 1991 Nepal census, the village had a population of 1762 living in 341 houses. At the time of the 2001 Nepal census, the population was 1710, of which 55% was literate.
