= Kushkot =

Kushkot कुशकोट
- Village development committee
- Location in Nepal
- Coordinates: 29.29°N 81.28°E
- Country: Nepal
- Zone: Seti Zone
- District: Achham District

Population (2001)
  - Total: 3,741
  - Religions: Hindu
- Time zone: UTC+5:45 (Nepal Time)

Kushkot is a village in Achham District in the Seti Zone of western Nepal. At the time of the 1991 Nepal census, the village had a population of 3138 living in 600 houses. At the time of the 2001 Nepal census, the population was 3741, of which 28% was literate. At the time of the 2011 Nepal census, Kushkot counted 4654 inhabitants.
