= Kalagaun, Achham =

Kalagaun कालागाउँ
- Former Village Development Committee
- Location in Nepal
- Coordinates: 29.14°N 81.36°E
- Country: Nepal
- Province: Sudurpashchim
- District: Achham
- Municipality: Mangalsen

Population (2001)
  - Total: 2,733
  - Religions: Hindu
- Time zone: UTC+5:45 (Nepal Time)

Kalagaun is a market centre in Mangalsen Municipality in Achham District in the Sudurpashchim Province of western Nepal. The municipality was established merging with existing Janalibandali, Kuntibandali, Oligaun, Jupu and Mangalsen Village Development Committees (VDCs) on 18 May 2014. At the time of the 1991 Nepal census, the village had a population of 2405 living in 494 houses. At the time of the 2001 Nepal census, the population was 2733, of which 44% was literate.
