= Birpath =

Birpath बीरपथ
- Former Village Development Committee
- Location in Nepal
- Coordinates: 29.10°N 81.32°E
- Country: Nepal
- Province: Sudurpashchim Province
- District: Achham District
- Part of: Kamalbazar Municipality

Population (2001)
  - Total: 2,358
  - Religions: Hindu
- Time zone: UTC+5:45 (Nepal Time)

Birpath is a former Village Development Committee (VDC) in Achham District in the Sudurpashchim Province of western Nepal. At the time of the 1991 Nepal census, the village had a population of 2002 living in 349 houses. At the time of the 2001 Nepal census, the population was 2358, of which 44% was literate.
