= Kuntibandali =

Kuntibandali कुन्तीबण्डली
- Former Village Development Committee
- Location in Nepal
- Coordinates: 29.10°N 81.20°E
- Country: Nepal
- Province: Sudurpashchim
- District: Achham
- Municipality: Mangalsen

Population (2001)
  - Total: 2,644
  - Religions: Hindu
- Time zone: UTC+5:45 (Nepal Time)

Kuntibandali is a market center in Mangalsen Municipality in the Sudurpashchim Province of western Nepal. The municipality was established merging with existing Janalibandali, Kuntibandali, Oligau, Jupu, Kalagaun and Mangalsen village development committees (VDCs) on 18 May 2014. At the time of the 1991 Nepal census, the village had a population of 2216 living in 409 houses. At the time of the 2001 Nepal census, the population was 2644, of which 32% was literate.
