= Tumarkhad =

Coordinates: 28°56′N 81°22′E

Turmakhad
- Village development committee
- Location in Nepal
- Country: Nepal
- Zone: Seti Zone
- District: Achham District

Population (2001)
  - Total: 3,366
  - Religions: Hindu
- Time zone: UTC+5:45 (Nepal Time)

Tumarkhad is a village in Achham District in the Seti Zone of western Nepal. According to the 1991 Nepal census, the village had a population of 2450 living in 485 houses. According to the 2001 Nepal census, the population was 3366, of which 23% was literate. Turmakhand is one of the most beautiful places in Achham district.
