= Khaptad, Achham =

Ward no. 12 of sanfebagar municipality

Khaptad खप्तड
- Village development committee
- Location in Nepal
- Coordinates: 29.33150°N 81.21125°E
- Country: Nepal
- Province: Sudurpashchim Province
- District: Achham District

Population (2001)
  - Total: 1,414
  - Religions: Hindu
- Time zone: UTC+5:45 (Nepal Time)

Khaptad is a village in Achham District in the Sudurpashchim Province of western Nepal. At the time of the 2001 Nepal census, the village had a population of 1414 living in 258 houses. At the time of the 2001 Nepal census, the population was 1414 of which 31.56% was literate.The male literacy rate was 67.26% and the female literacy rate was 3.42%.
