= Hichma =

Hichma हिचमा
- Village development committee
- Location in Nepal
- Coordinates: 29.02°N 81.22°E
- Country: Nepal
- Zone: Seti Zone
- District: Achham District

Population (2001)
  - Total: 4,464
  - Religions: Hindu
- Time zone: UTC+5:45 (Nepal Time)

Hichma is a small town in Achham District in the Seti Zone of western Nepal. At the time of the 1991 Nepal census, the town had a population of 3964 living in 727 houses. At the time of the 2001 Nepal census, the population was 4464, of which 28% was literate.
