= Nawathana =

Nawathana नवाठाना
- Former Village Development Committee
- Location in Nepal
- Coordinates: 29.23°N 81.24°E
- Country: Nepal
- Province: Sudurpashchim Province
- District: Achham District
- Part of: Sanphebagar Municipality

Population (2001)
  - Total: 1,974
  - Religions: Hindu
- Time zone: UTC+5:45 (Nepal Time)

Nawathana is a business center in Sanphebagar Municipality in Achham District in the Sudurpashchim Province of western Nepal. It was annexed to form the new municipality since 18 May 2014. At the time of the 1991 Nepal census, the village had a population of 1815 living in 363 houses. At the time of the 2001 Nepal census, the population was 1974, of which 41% was literate.
