= Bannatoli =

Bannatoli बान्नाटोली
- Village development committee
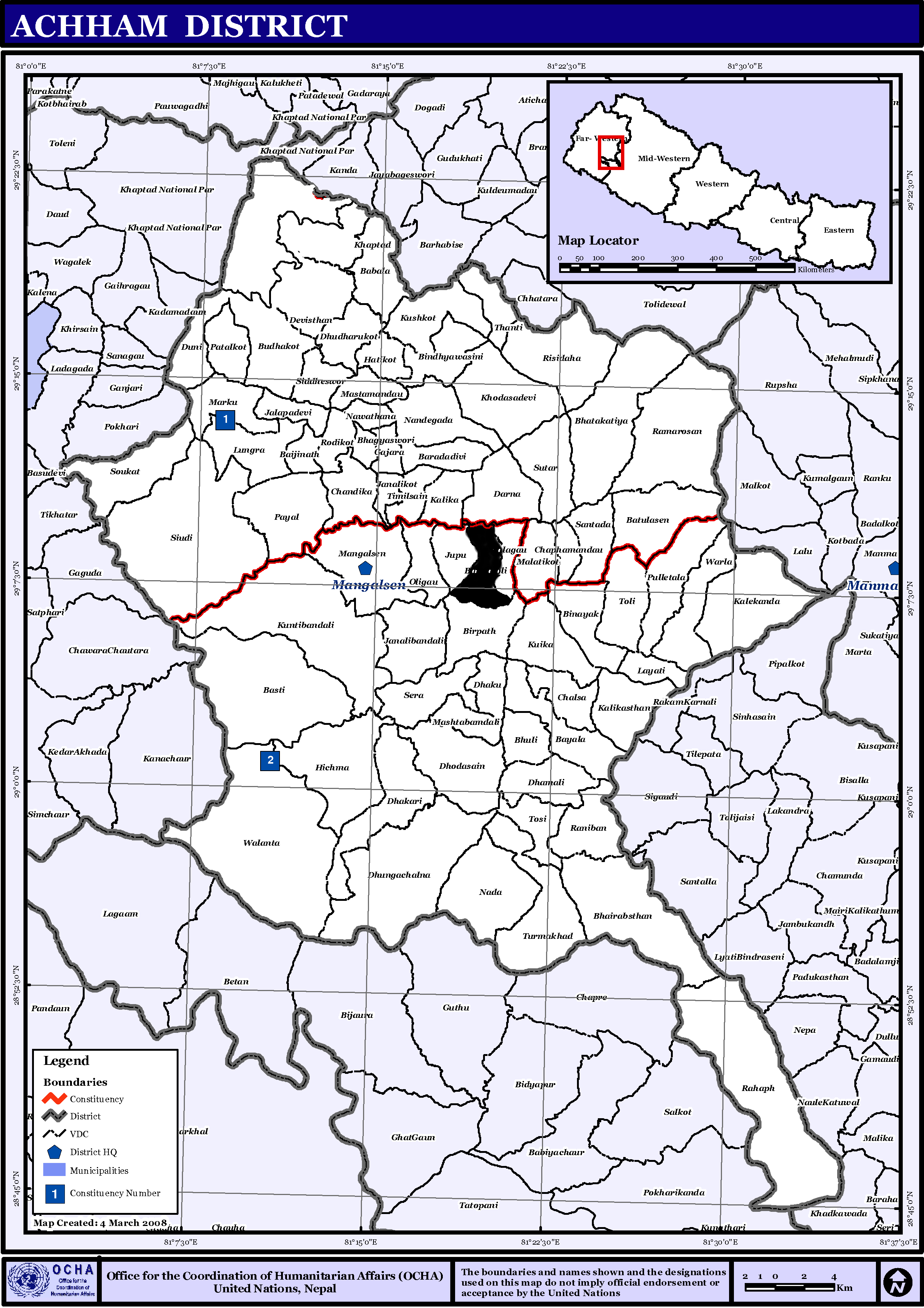
- Map displaying Bannatoli VDC in Achham District

- Location in Nepal
- Coordinates: 29.14°N 81.33°E
- Country: Nepal
- Zone: Seti Zone
- District: Achham District

Population (2001)
  - Total: 2,712
  - Religions: Hindu
- Time zone: UTC+5:45 (Nepal Time)

Bannatoli is a village development committee in Achham District in the Seti Zone of western Nepal. According to the 1991 Nepal census, it has a population of 2600 and had 642 houses in the village. At the time of the 2001 Nepal census, the population was 2712, of which 28% was literate. The population is entirely Hindu.
