= Kalika, Achham =

Kalika कालिका
- Former Village Development Committee
- Location in Nepal
- Coordinates: 29°03′36″N 81°25′12″E
- Country: Nepal
- Province: Sudurpashchim Province
- District: Achham District
- Part of: Bannigadi Jayagad Rural Municipality

Population (2011)
  - Total: 3,081
- Time zone: UTC+5:45 (Nepal Time)
- Postal code: 10704
- Area code: 097

Kalika is a village in Achham District in the Seti Zone of western Nepal. In the 1991 Nepal census, the village had a population of 2944 living in 622 houses. Ten years later, in the 2001 Nepal census, the population was 3250, of which 37% was literate.
