= Pulletala =

Pulletala पुल्लेताला
- Former Village Development Committee
- Location in Nepal
- Coordinates: 29.14°N 81.45°E
- Country: Nepal
- Province: Sudurpashchim Province
- District: Achham District
- Part of: Panchadewal Binayak Municipality

Population (2001)
  - Total: 2,628
  - Religions: Hindu
- Time zone: UTC+5:45 (Nepal Time)

Pulletala is a village in Achham District in the Sudurpashchim Province of western Nepal. At the time of the 1991 Nepal census, the village had a population of 2471 living in 422 houses. At the time of the 2001 Nepal census, the population was 2628, of which 59% were literate.
