= Walant =

Coordinates: 29°0′N 81°10′E

Balata बलाता
- Village development committee
- Interactive map of Balata
- Country: Nepal
- Zone: Seti Zone
- District: Achham District

Population (2001)
  - Total: 3,624
  - Religions: Hindu
- Time zone: UTC+5:45 (Nepal Time)

Walant is a village in Achham District in the Seti Zone of western Nepal. At the time of the 2001 Nepal census, the population was 3624, of which 20% was literate.
