= Chandika, Nepal =

Chandika चण्डिका Bayalpata (बयलपाटा)
- Former Village Development Committee
- Location in Nepal
- Coordinates: 29°11′24″N 81°13′48″E
- Country: Nepal
- Province: Sudurpashchim Province
- District: Achham District
- Part of: Sanphebagar Municipality

Population (2001)
  - Total: 2,383
  - Religions: Hindu Muslim
- Time zone: UTC+5:45 (Nepal Time)

Chandika (also Bayalpata) is a business center in Sanphebagar Municipality in Achham District in the Sudurpashchim Province of western Nepal. It was annexed to form the new municipality named Sanphebagar Municipality on 18 May 2014. At the time of the 1991 Nepal census, the village had a population of 2129 living in 446 houses. At the time of the 2001 Nepal census, the population was 2383, of which 45% was literate.
