= Sera, Nepal =

Sera, Nepal सेरा
- Former Village Development Committee
- Location in Nepal
- Coordinates: 29.06°N 81.28°E
- Country: Nepal
- Province: Sudurpashchim Province
- District: Achham District
- Part of: Kamalbazar Municipality

Population (2001)
  - Total: 2,626
  - Religions: Hindu
- Time zone: UTC+5:45 (Nepal Time)

Sera, Nepal is a village in Achham District in the Sudurpashchim Province of western Nepal. At the time of the 1991 Nepal census, the village had a population of 2478 living in 499 houses. At the time of the 2001 Nepal census, the population was 2626, of which 31% were literate.

Sera is traditionally home to Chhetri Bhandari's who were originally Khadka's, came from Doti Kingdom.
