= Bhuli, Nepal =

Muli, Nepal
- former village development committee
- Nickname: टाकाबाडा
- Location in Nepal
- Coordinates: 29.04°N 81.36°E
- Country: Nepal
- Zone: Seti Zone
- District: Achham District

Population (2001)
  - Total: 2,545
  - Religions: Hindu
- Time zone: UTC+5:45 (Nepal Time)

Muli is a former village development committee in Achham District in the Seti Zone of western Nepal. According to the 1991 Nepal census, the village had a population of 2352 living in 462 houses. At the time of the 2001 Nepal census, the population was 2545, of which 39% was literate. Muli now is part of Kamalbazar Municipality which was established in 2014. It is one of 10 wards under Kamalbazar municipality in Achham district in Sudurpaschim province.
