= Bindhyawasini =

Bindhyawasini विन्द्यवासिनी
- Village development committee
- Location in Nepal
- Coordinates: 29.27°N 81.30°E
- Country: Nepal
- Zone: Seti Zone
- District: Achham District

Population (2001)
  - Total: 3,041
  - Religions: Hindu
- Time zone: UTC+5:45 (Nepal Time)

Bindhyawasini is a village in Achham District in the Seti Zone of western Nepal. According to the 1991 Nepal census, the village had a population of 2402 living in 485 houses. At the time of the 2001 Nepal census, the population was 3041, of which 37% was literate.
