= Payal, Nepal =

Payal, Achham Nepal पायल अछाम कुवॅंर बाडी
- Village development committee
- Location in Nepal
- Coordinates: 29.17°N 81.19°E
- Country: Nepal
- Province: Sudurpashchim Province
- District: Achham District
- Rural municipality: Chaurpati Rural Municipality

Government
  - Socialist: Prakash Bahadur Kunwar

Population (2001)
  - Total: 4,950
  - Religions: Hindu
- Time zone: UTC+5:45 (Nepal Time)

Payal is a small town in the Chaurpati Rural Municipality of Achham District in the Sudurpashchim Province of western Nepal. At the time of the 1991 Nepal census, the town had a population of 4404 living in 1015 houses. Jhadbazar is the centre market area of Payal. The town is in Chaurpati Rural Municipality Ward no. 04. At the time of the 2001 Nepal census, the population was 4950, of which 37% was literate.
