= Jupu =

Jupu जुपु
- Former Village Development Committee
- Location in Nepal
- Coordinates: 29.15°N 81.30°E
- Country: Nepal
- Province: Sudurpashchim
- District: Achham
- Municipality: Mangalsen

Population (2001)
  - Total: 3,072
  - Religions: Hindu
- Time zone: UTC+5:45 (Nepal Time)

Jupu is a market center in Mangalsen Municipality in Achham District in the Sudurpashchim Province of western Nepal. The municipality was established merging with existing Janalibandali, Kuntibandali, Oligau, Jupu, Kalagaun and Mangalsen village development committees (VDCs) on 18 May 2014. At the time of the 1991 Nepal census, the village had a population of 3096 living in 628 houses. At the time of the 2001 Nepal census, the population was 3072, of which 45% was literate. It lies in the height of 2,400 m (7,900 ft) above sea level. The village is enriched in different cultures like the Dashain festival.

Mostly in jupu rawal families are leaving. Main festival jupu gaon is Chaitraasthmi which is celebrate by all castes and communities through the part of Achham District. Main Temple is Shri Kalika Mata which is built at middle of Jupu gaon Near Khaula(Patkani) holi putala like Bada Dasain also celebrate in jupu Gaon.
