= Jalapadevi =

Jalapadevi जाल्पादेवी
- Former Village Development Committee
- Location in Nepal
- Coordinates: 29.23°N 81.19°E
- Country: Nepal
- Province: Sudurpashchim Province
- District: Achham District
- Part of: Sanphebagar Municipality

Population (2001)
  - Total: 2,637
  - Religions: Hindu
- Time zone: UTC+5:45 (Nepal Time)

Jalapadevi is a business center in Sanphebagar Municipality in Achham District in the Sudurpashchim Province of western Nepal. It was annexed to form the new municipality since 18 May 2014. At the time of the 1991 Nepal census, the village had a population of 2376 living in 509 houses. At the time of the 2001 Nepal census, the population was 2637, of which 49% was literate.
