= Warla, Achham =

Warla वार्ला
- Former Village Development Committee
- Location in Nepal
- Coordinates: 29.15°N 81.49°E
- Country: Nepal
- Province: Sudurpashchim Province
- District: Achham District
- Part of: Panchadewal Binayak Municipality

Population (2001)
  - Total: 3,140
  - Religions: Hindu
- Time zone: UTC+5:45 (Nepal Time)

Warla is a village in Achham District in the Sudurpashchim Province of western Nepal. At the time of the 1991 Nepal census, the village had a population of 2469 living in 449 houses. At the time of the 2001 Nepal census, the population was 3140, of which 32% was literate.
