= Dhaku =

Dhaku ढाकु
- Former Village Development Committee
- Location in Nepal
- Coordinates: 29.07°N 81.33°E
- Country: Nepal
- Province: Sudurpashchim Province
- District: Achham District
- Part of: Kamalbazar Municipality

Population (2001)
  - Total: 1,687
  - Religions: Hindu
- Time zone: UTC+5:45 (Nepal Time)

Dhaku is a former Village development committee in Achham District in the Sudurpashchim Province of western Nepal. At the time of the 1991 Nepal census, the village had a population of 1552 living in 292 houses. At the time of the 2001 Nepal census, the population was 1687, of which 33% was literate. Dhaku now is part of Kamalbazar Municipality which was established in 2014.
