= Oligaun =

Oligaun ओलीगाउँ
- Former Village Development Committee
- Location in Nepal
- Coordinates: 29.13°N 81.28°E
- Country: Nepal
- Province: Sudurpashchim
- District: Achham
- Municipality: Mangalsen

Population (2001)
  - Total: 3,429
  - Religions: Hindu
- Time zone: UTC+5:45 (Nepal Time)

Oligaun is a market center in Mangalsen Municipality in the Seti Zone of western Nepal. The municipality was established merging with existing Janalibandali, Kuntibandali, Oligaun, Jupu, Kalagaun and Mangalsen village development committees (VDCs) on 18 May 2014. At the time of the 1991 Nepal census, the village had a population of 3077 living in 657 houses. At the time of the 2001 Nepal census, the population was 3429, of which 41% was literate.
