= Bayala =

Bayala बयला
- Former Village Development Committee
- Location in Nepal
- Coordinates: 29.04°N 81.39°E
- Country: Nepal
- Province: Sudurpashchim
- District: Achham
- Municipality: Kamalbazar

Population (1991)
  - Religions: Hindu
- Time zone: UTC+5:45 (Nepal Time)

Bayala is a former Village development committee in Achham District in the Sudurpashchim Province of western Nepal. At the time of the 2001 Nepal census, the population was 3464, of which 28% was literate. Bayala now forms part of the municipality of Kamalbazar which was established in 2014.
