= Binayak, Nepal =

Binayak, Nepal विनायक
- Former Village Development Committee
- Location in Nepal
- Coordinates: 29.11°N 81.39°E
- Country: Nepal
- Province: Sudurpashchim Province
- District: Achham District
- Part of: Panchadewal Binayak Municipality

Population (2001)
  - Total: 4,881
  - Religions: Hindu
- Time zone: UTC+5:45 (Nepal Time)

Binayak is a small town in Achham District in the Sudurpashchim Province of western Nepal. According to the 1991 Nepal census, the village had a population of 4270 living in 831 houses. At the time of the 2001 Nepal census, the population was 4881, of which 30% was literate.
