= Budhakot =

Budhakot बुढाकोट
- Village development committee
- Location in Nepal
- Coordinates: 29.27°N 81.18°E
- Country: Nepal
- Zone: Seti Zone
- District: Achham District

Population (2001)
  - Total: 2,759
  - Religions: Hindu
- Time zone: UTC+5:45 (Nepal Time)

Budhakot is a village in Achham District in the Seti Zone of western Nepal. At the time of the 1991 Nepal census, the village had a population of 2234 living in 476 houses. At the time of the 2001 Nepal census, the population was 2759, of which 34% was literate.
