= Budhi Ganga River =

Budhi Ganga

Location
- Country: Nepal
- Province: Sudurpashchim Province

Physical characteristics
- Source
  - location: Jagadulla Lake, Bajura District of Nepal
- Mouth
  - location: Karnali River, Nepal
- Length: 50 km (31 mi)
- Basin size: 100 km^{2} (39 sq mi)
- Discharge
  - average: 70 m^{3}/s (2,500 cu ft/s) March: 50 m^{3}/s (1,800 cu ft/s) July: 580 m^{3}/s (20,000 cu ft/s)

Basin features
- Progression: Bajura District and Achham District
- River system: Karnali River
- Tributaries
  - left: Humla Karnali River
  - right: Seti River

The Budhi Ganga River is a tributary of the Karnali River in Nepal. The source of this river is Jagadullah lake in the Bajura District of Nepal. Budhi Ganga passes through Achham District, crosses Sanfebagar Municipality in Achham under Seti-Lokmarga Road before continuing beyond Sanfebagar Bazar, through Chitre and along the river bank to meet the Seti River at the border of Achham district and Doti district, before washing out into the Karnali River.
