= Sanphebagar Airport =

Sanphebagar Airport साँफेबगर विमानस्थल
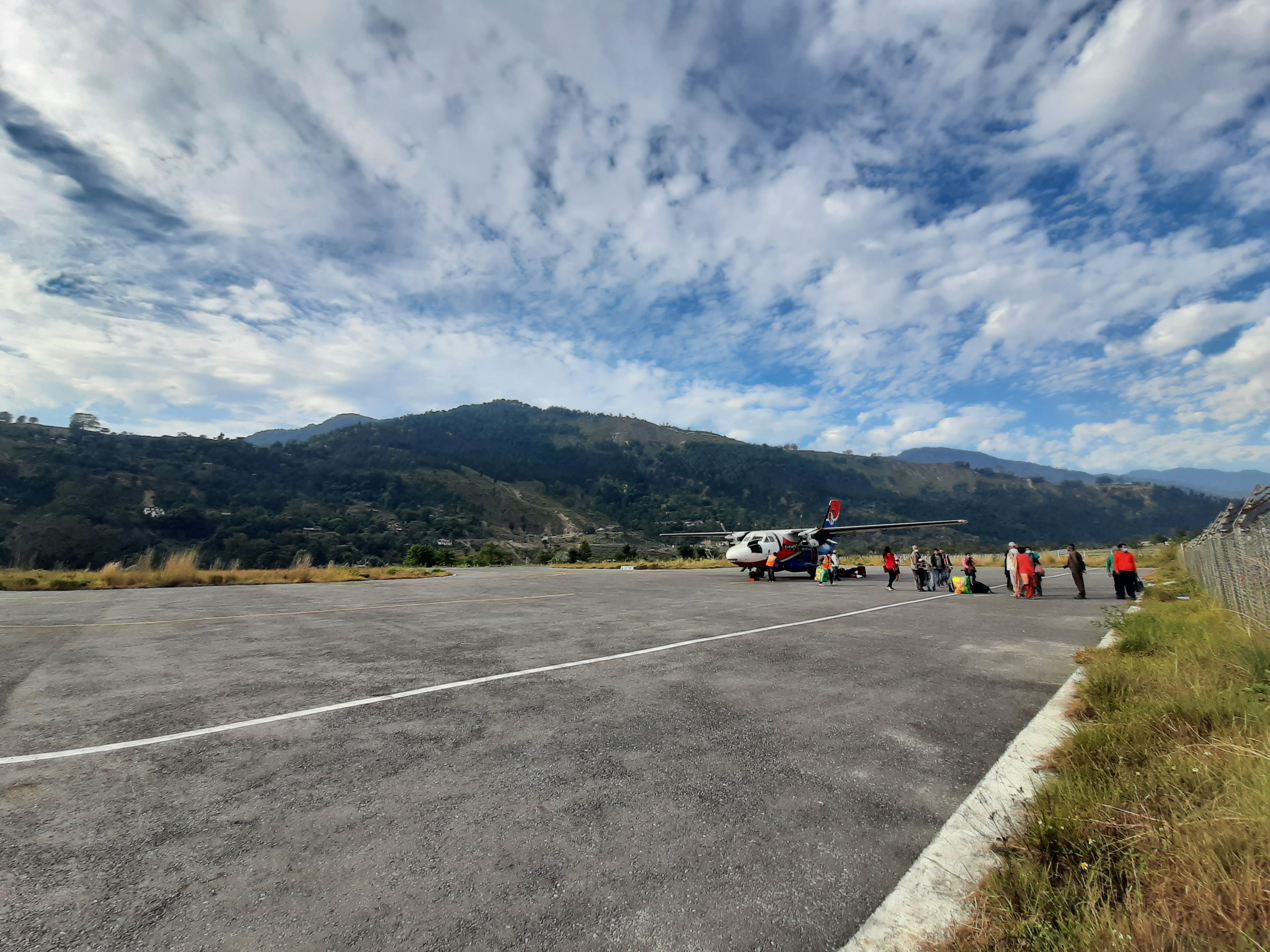
- IATA: FEB; ICAO: VNSR

Summary
- Airport type: Public
- Owner: Government of Nepal
- Operator: Civil Aviation Authority of Nepal
- Serves: Sanphebagar, Nepal
- Elevation AMSL: 1,955 ft / 596 m
- Coordinates: 29°14′0″N 081°13′0″E

Map
- Location of airport in Nepal

Runways
Direction	Length		Surface
Direction	m	ft	Surface
02/20	530	1,739	Asphalt

Sanphebagar Airport (IATA: FEB, ICAO: VNSR) is a domestic airport located in Sanphebagar serving Achham District, a district in Sudurpashchim Province in Nepal.

== History ==
In 1967, the Airport was first constructed only having a Grass/Clay runway. It came into operation in 1975.

In February 2002, the terminal building and the airport's control tower was destroyed in a Maoist attack. It was restored and upgraded and reopened for operations in 2018.

== Facilities ==
The airport is at an elevation of 1,955 feet (596 m) above mean sea level. Since the renovation of the airport in 2018, the airport has one asphalt runway which is 530 metres (1,739 ft) in length.

== Airlines and destinations ==
Currently, there are no scheduled services to and from Sanphebagar Airport. In 2019, Nepal Airlines briefly operated routes to Nepalgunj.
