= Bhuli =

Bhuli may refer to:

- Bhuli, India
- Bhuli, Nepal
