= Panchadewal Binayak =

Panchadewal Binayak पञ्चदेवल विनायक
- Municipality
- Location within Sudurpashchim Province Location within Nepal
- Coordinates: 29.11°N 81.39°E
- Country: Nepal
- Province: Sudurpashchim
- District: Achham
- No. of wards: 9
- Established: 10 March 2017
- Incorporated (VDC): Kuika (half part), Binayak, Kalikasthan, Layati, Toli, Pulletala, Warla and Kalekanda
- Admin HQ.: Kuika

Government
  - Type: Mayor–council
  - Body: Panchadewal Binayak Municipality
  - Mayor: Mr. Debraj Devkota
  - Deputy Mayor: Mrs. Ambika Chalaune

Area
  - Total: 147.75 km^{2} (57.05 sq mi)

Population (2011)
  - Total: 27,485
  - Density: 186.09/km^{2} (482.0/sq mi)
  - Households: 4,969

Demographics
  - Ethnic Groups: Chetri, Bahun, Kami, Magar
  - Female ♀: 53.20
  - Male ♂ /100 female: 46.80
- Time zone: UTC+05:45 (NPT)
- Main Language(s): Nepali, Acchami, Magar
- Website: panchadewalbinayakmun.gov.np

Panchadewal Binayak is a municipality located in Accham District of Sudurpashchim province of Nepal. It is surrounded by Kalikot District of Karnali Province in the East, Kamalbazar in the West, Ramaroshan in the North and Dailekh District in the South.

== History ==
On 10 March 2017 Government of Nepal announced 744 local level units as per the new constitution of Nepal 2015. thus this local level unit came into existence. Total area of the municipality is 147.75 square kilometres (57.05 sq mi) and total population of the municipality (according to 2011 Nepal census) is 27485. The municipality is divided into 9 wards. Kuika (half part), Binayak, Kalikasthan, Layati, Toli, Pulletala, Warla and Kalekanda villages were merged to form this new local level unit.

== Demographics ==
At the time of the 2011 Nepal census, Panchadewal Binayak Municipality had a population of 27,495. Of these, 95.0% spoke Nepali, 3.5% Achhami, 1.3% Magar and 0.1% other languages as their first language.

In terms of ethnicity/caste, 46.9% were Chhetri, 16.3% Hill Brahmin, 14.3% Kami, 13.8% other Dalit, 3.1% Magar, 2.9% Damai/Dholi, 1.5% Thakuri, 0.5% Lohar, 0.4% Sarki, 0.1% other Terai, 0.1% Tharu and 0.1% others.

In terms of religion, 98.0% were Hindu and 1.9% Buddhist.

In terms of literacy, 51.0% could read and write, 4.2% could only read and 44.7% could neither read nor write.
