= Jhapat Bahadur Saud =

Nepalese politician

Honourable Jhapat Bahadur Saud
- झपट बहादुर साउँद

Member of the Sudurpashchim Provincial Assembly
- Incumbent
- Assumed office 30 December 2022

Personal details
- Born: 7 July 1980 (age 46) Achham District, Nepal
- Party: Nepali Communist Party
- Profession: Politician

Jhapat Bahadur Saud (Nepali: झपट बहादुर साउँद) is a Nepalese politician and currently serving as a member of the Sudurpashchim Provincial Assembly, having won the 2022 Nepalese provincial election from Achham 1 (B) constituency. Saud had previously served as the Minister for Social Development of Sudurpashchim Province.

== Electoral history ==
=== 2022 provincial elections ===
==== Achham 1 (B) ====
Candidate	Party	Votes	%
Jhapat Bahadur Saud	CPN(Maoist Centre)	12,115	57.32
Krishna Prasad Joshi	CPN (UML)	9,019	42.68
Total		21,134	100.00
Majority		3,096	
CPN(Maoist Centre) hold			
