= Dharaki =

Dharaki धारकी
- Village development committee
- Country: Nepal
- Zone: Seti Zone
- District: Achham District

Population (1991)
  - Religions: Hindu
- Time zone: UTC+5:45 (Nepal Time)

Dharaki is a village in Achham District in the Seti Zone of western Nepal.
