= Dhakari =

Dhakari ढकारी
- Village development committee
- Location in Nepal
- Coordinates: 29.00°N 81.27°E
- Country: Nepal
- Zone: Seti Zone
- District: Achham District

Population (2001)
  - Total: 3,272
  - Religions: Hindu
- Time zone: UTC+5:45 (Nepal Time)

Dhakari is a village in Achham District in the Seti Zone of western Nepal. At the time of the 1991 Nepal census, the village had a population of 2967 living in 570 houses. At the time of the 2001 Nepal census, the population was 3272, of which 20% was literate.
