= Sher Bahadur Kunwor =

Nepali politician

Honourable Sher Bahadur Kunwar
- शेर बहादुर कुँवर

Minister of Labour, Employment and Social Security
- In office 27 June 2022 – 26 December 2022
- President: Bidya Devi Bhandari
- Prime Minister: Sher Bahadur Deuba
- Preceded by: Krishna Kumar Shrestha
- Succeeded by: Pushpa Kamal Dahal (as Prime Minister)

Member of Parliament, Pratinidhi Sabha
- In office 22 December 2022 – 12 September 2025
- Preceded by: Bhim Bahadur Rawal
- Succeeded by: Bharat Kumar Swar
- Constituency: Achham 1

Member of Parliament, Rastriya Sabha
- In office 4 March 2018 – 3 March 2022
- Constituency: Sudurpashchim Province

Member of the Constituent Assembly
- In office 28 May 2008 – 28 May 2012
- Preceded by: Gobinda Bahadur Shah (as Member of Parliament)
- Succeeded by: Bhim Bahadur Rawal
- Constituency: Achham 1

Personal details
- Born: 22 August 1966 (age 59) Achham District, Nepal
- Party: CPN (Unified Socialist) (since 2022)
- Other political affiliations: CPN (UML) (until 2022)

Sher Bahadur Kunwor (Nepali: शेरबहादुर कुँवर) is a Nepali politician who is currently serving as the Minister of Labour, Employment and Social Security in the ruling coalition led by Prime Minister and Nepali Congress President Sher Bahadur Deuba. He is currently a member of the CPN (Unified Socialist).

He was elected from the Achham 1 constituency, winning 21631 votes. He is the current Member of National Assembly of Nepal representing Sudurpaschim Pradesh.
