= Sharad Singh Bhandari =

Nepalese politician

Sharad Singh
- शरद सिंह

Member of the Constituent Assembly
- In office 28 May 2008 – 28 May 2012
- Preceded by: Ram Bahadur Bista (as Member of Parliament)
- Succeeded by: Bharat Saud
- Constituency: Achham 2

Personal details
- Born: November 8, 1975 (age 50) Achham
- Party: Nepal Communist Party (NCP)
- Spouse: Chetana Regmi
- Children: 2
- Occupation: Agriculture Business
- Committees: Central Committee /PBM

Sharad Singh Bhandari is a Nepalese Revolutionary politician, belonging to the Communist Party Nepal(Maoist Centre). In the 2008 Constituent Assembly election he was elected from the Achham-2 constituency, winning 17976 votes.
