= Siddheswor =

Siddheswor may refer to:

- Siddheswor, Achham, Nepal
- Siddheswor, Baitadi, Nepal
- Siddheswor, Kosi, Nepal
