= Payal =

Payal may refer to:

- Payal, India, a town in India
  - Payal Assembly Constituency, the Punjab assembly constituency encompassing the town
- Payal, Nepal, a town in Nepal
- Payal, an Indian anklet
- Payal (film), a 1957 Hindi-language film

== People ==
- Payal Gupta, Indian television actress
- Payal Malhotra, Indian producer
- Payal Rohatgi, Indian actress
- Payal Singh , Indian Model and actress
- Payal Nag, Indian para-archer

== See also ==
- Paayal, a 1992 Bollywood film
