= Tadigaira =

Coordinates: 29°12′N 81°26′E

Tadigaira तादीगहिरा
- Village development committee
- Interactive map of Tadigaira
- Country: Nepal
- Zone: Seti Zone
- District: Achham District

Population (1991)
  - Total: 3,724
  - Religions: Hindu
- Time zone: UTC+5:45 (Nepal Time)

Tadigaira is a small town in Achham District in the Seti Zone of western Nepal. At the time of the 1991 Nepal census it had a population of 3,724 and had 664 houses in the village.
