= Toli, Achham =

Toli टोली
- Former Village Development Committee
- Location in Nepal
- Coordinates: 29°14′N 81°08′E
- Country: Nepal
- Province: Sudurpashchim Province
- Districts of Nepal: Achham District
- Part of: Panchadewal Binayak Municipality
- Time zone: UTC+5:45 (Nepal Time)
- Postal code: 10706
- Area code: 097

Toli is a village in Panchadewal Binayak Municipality of Achham District in Sudurpashchim Province, Nepal. At the time of 1991 Nepal census, the population was 2921 in 499 households. At the time of 2001 Nepal census, the population was 3441. This VDC was later merged with Panchadewal Binayak Municipality during the restructuring of local levels by the Government of Nepal.

== Geography ==
Toli is located in the hilly region of western Nepal within Panchadewal Binayak Municipality.

== Administration ==
The village is part of Panchadewal Binayak Municipality, which was formed by merging former village development committees.
