= Chalsa =

Chalsa may refer to:

- Chalsa, India, a town in West Bengal, India
  - Chalsa railway station
- Chalsa, Nepal, a village in western Nepal
