= Pushpa Bahadur Shah =

Nepalese politician

Honourable Pushpa Bahadur Shah
- पुष्प बहादुर शाह

Member of Parliament, Pratinidhi Sabha
- In office 22 December 2022 – 12 September 2025
- Preceded by: Yagya Bahadur Bogati
- Succeeded by: Yagya Bahadur Bogati
- Constituency: Achham 2

Personal details
- Born: 9 December 1960 (age 65) Achham District
- Party: Nepali Congress
- Spouse: Netreshwari Shah
- Parent: Padma Dhoj Shah (father)

Pushpa Bahadur Shah is a Nepalese politician, belonging to the Nepali Congress currently serving as a member of the 2nd Federal Parliament of Nepal. In the 2022 Nepalese general election, he won the election from Achham 2 (constituency).
