= Siddheshwar, Achham =

Siddheshwar सिद्धेश्वर
- Former Village Development Committee
- Location in Nepal
- Coordinates: 29.25°N 81.21°E
- Country: Nepal
- Province: Sudurpashchim Province
- District: Achham District
- Part of: Sanphebagar Municipality

Population (2001)
  - Total: 4,355
  - Religions: Hindu
- Time zone: UTC+5:45 (Nepal Time)

Siddheshwar is a business center in Sanphebagar Municipality in Achham District in the Sudurpashchim Province of western Nepal. It was annexed to form the new municipality on 18 May 2014. At the time of the 1991 Nepal census, the village had a population of 3,190 living in 691 houses. At the time of the 2001 Nepal census, the population was 4,355, of which 45% was literate.
