= Bhim Bahadur Rawal =

Nepali politician

Honourable Bhim Bahadur Rawal
- भीम बहादुर रावल

Deputy Prime Minister of Nepal
- In office 5 November 2015 – 1 August 2016
- President: Bidya Devi Bhandari
- Prime Minister: K. P. Sharma Oli

Defence Minister of Nepal
- In office 5 November 2015 – 1 August 2016
- President: Bidya Devi Bhandari
- Prime Minister: K. P. Sharma Oli
- Preceded by: Sushil Koirala (as prime minister)
- Succeeded by: Bal Krishna Khand

Minister of Home Affairs of Nepal
- In office 2009–2011
- President: Ram Baran Yadav
- Prime Minister: Madhav Kumar Nepal

Minister of Culture, Tourism and Civil Aviation and Minister of Science and Technology
- In office 1998–1999
- Monarch: Birendra
- Prime Minister: Girija Prasad Koirala

Minister of State for Commerce, Tourism and Civil Aviation
- In office 1994–1995
- Monarch: Birendra
- Prime Minister: Man Mohan Adhikari

Member of Parliament, Pratinidhi Sabha
- In office 4 March 2018 – 18 September 2022
- Preceded by: Himself (as Member of the Constituent Assembly)
- Succeeded by: Sher Bahadur Kunwor
- Constituency: Achham 1
- In office 14 December 1994 – 15 January 1999
- Preceded by: Bal Bahadur Kunwar
- Succeeded by: Gobinda Bahadur Shah
- Constituency: Achham 1

Member of the Constituent Assembly
- In office 21 January 2014 – 14 October 2017
- Preceded by: Sher Bahadur Kunwor
- Succeeded by: Himself (as Member of Parliament)
- Constituency: Achham 1
- In office 28 May 2008 – 28 May 2012
- Constituency: Party list (CPN (UML))

Personal details
- Born: 19 July 1956 (age 70) Achham, Nepal
- Party: Nepali Communist Party
- Other political affiliations: CPN (UML) (till 2024)
- Spouse: Sangita Rawal
- Parent(s): Moti Singh Rawal (father); Dhana Shova Rawal(mother)
- Education: Tribhuvan University (PhD)

Dr. Bhim Bahadur Rawal (Nepali: डा.भीम बहादुर रावल) commonly known as Bhim Rawal is Nepali politician who former Deputy Prime Minister & Defence Minister of Nepal in First Oli cabinet. He served as the Minister of Home Affairs of Nepal in Madhav Nepal cabinet.

Rawal has previously served as Minister of Culture, Tourism and Civil Aviation in Girija Prasad Koirala cabinet led by Nepali Congress from 1998 - 1999. He was taken as prospective CPN-UML chairman by his cadres during 2017 Nepalese legislative election campaign. After his lost in 10th general congress of CPN (UML) from KP Sharma Oli in chairman post gaining as low as 10% vote, his political future is said to be uncertain and was finally was expelled from the party in 2024.

== Personal life ==
Rawal was born in Achham district, Nepal. He has a wife and two sons. He obtained both master's and bachelor's degree from the Tribhuwan University and in the 1980s became a lawyer, specialized in legal awareness for the Nepal Bar Association. He has done PhD on Political Violence and the Maoist Insurgency in Nepal.

== Political career ==
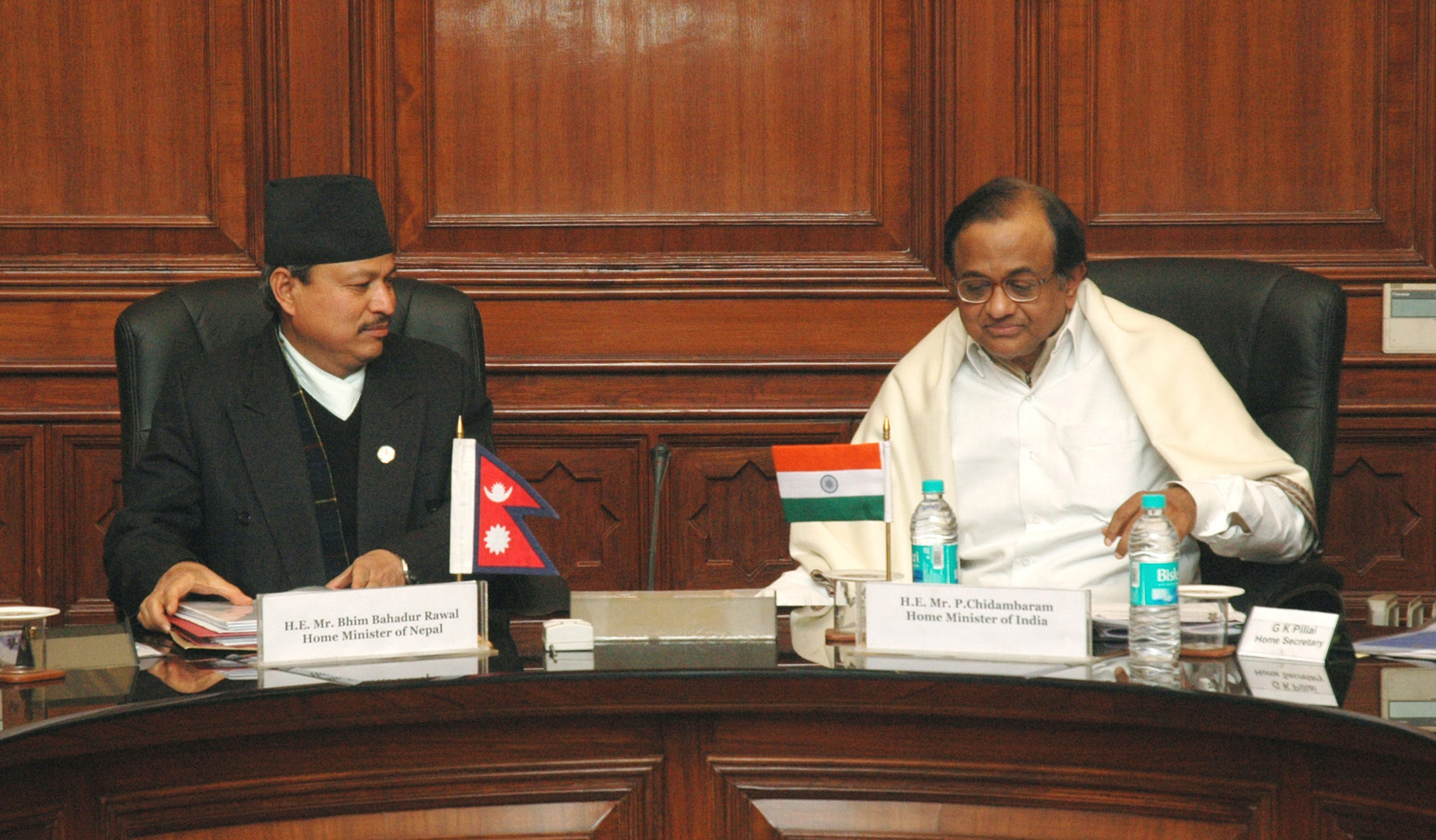
Bhim Bahadur Rawal meeting the Union Home Minister, Shri P. Chidambaram of India

Rawal began his political career when he began serving as Jhalanath Khanal's adviser in 1990. From 1992 to 1993 he served on the United Nations's Cambodian elections panel and later allied himself with Madhav Kumar Nepal. In 1994 he was elected into Parliament following by being its Minister for Commerce, Tourism and Civil Aviation till 1995. From 1998 to 1999 he served the same positions for second term and also was Minister of Science and Technology. In April 2008 he was Proportional representative of the 2nd Nepalese Constituent Assembly.

In 2009 he spoke at the Millennium Development Goals' meeting about least developed countries. After the meeting he addressed the Third UN Private Sector Forum regarding poverty and hunger and urged the government and various private sectors to work together in order to form economy's synergy.

In 2014 it was reported that he was injured in a Sharma Oli attack on a campaign trail at a Seti-Kathmandu liaison committee.

== Controversies ==
=== Regarding MCC ===
Rawal emerged as one of the largest critic of MCC. Later it was accused that he was one of the five Deputy Prime Minister in KP Sharma Oli cabinet including Bijay Kumar Gachhadar, C. P. Mainali, Kamal Thapa and Top Bahadur Rayamajhi who were accused of paving the way for MCC in Nepal.

=== Resignation from MP ===
On 18 July 2021, he had resigned as member of parliament stating he wanted to leave active politics.

== See also ==
- Achham 1 (constituency)
- Nepal Communist Party
