= Toli =

Toli may refer to:

== China ==
- Toli County, China

== Nepal ==
- Toli, Bheri
- Toli, Seti

== Other ==
- Toli, a company-sized unit in the Afghan National Army
- Toli (shamanism), a ritual mirror used in Shamanism in Mongolia and the Republic of Buryatia
