= Chalsa, Nepal =

Chalsa, Nepal चालसा
- Former Village Development Committee
- Location in Nepal
- Coordinates: 29.06°N 81.39°E
- Country: Nepal
- Province: Sudurpashchim Province
- District: Achham District
- Part of: Kamalbazar Municipality

Population (2001)
  - Total: 2,142
  - Religions: Hindu
- Time zone: UTC+5:45 (Nepal Time)

Chalsa is a former Village Development Committee in Achham District in the Sudurpashchim Province of western Nepal. At the time of the 1991 Nepal census, the village had a population of 1721 living in 289 houses. At the time of the 2001 Nepal census, the population was 2142, of which 26% was literate. Chalsa now is part of Kamalbazar Municipality which was established in 2014.
