= Yagya Bahadur Bogati =

Nepalese politician

- यज्ञ बहादुर बोगटी

Member of Parliament, Pratinidhi Sabha
- Incumbent
- Assumed office 26 March 2026
- Preceded by: Pushpa Bahadur Shah
- Constituency: Achham 2
- In office 4 March 2018 – 18 September 2022
- Preceded by: Bharat Saud (as Member of the Constituent Assembly)
- Succeeded by: Pushpa Bahadur Shah
- Constituency: Achham 2

Personal details
- Born: 18 January 1976 (age 50)
- Party: CPN (UML)

Yagya Bahadur Bogati is a Nepalese politician, belonging to the CPN (UML) currently serving as the member of the parliament in 7th House of representative. In the 2017 Nepalese general election he was elected from the Achham 2 constituency, securing 21965(53.26%) votes.
