= Gobinda Bahadur Shah =

Nepali politician

Member of Parliament, Pratinidhi Sabha
- In office 28 April 2006 – 16 January 2008
- Preceded by: Himself (2002)
- Succeeded by: Sher Bahadur Kunwor (as Member of the Constituent Assembly)
- Constituency: Achham 1
- In office 23 June 1999 – 22 May 2002
- Preceded by: Bhim Bahadur Rawal
- Succeeded by: Himself (2006)
- Constituency: Achham 1
- In office 20 June 1991 – 11 July 1994
- Preceded by: Constituency created
- Succeeded by: Bhim Bahadur Kathayat
- Constituency: Achham 2

Personal details
- Party: Nepali Congress
- Other political affiliations: Nepali Congress (Democratic)

Gobinda Bahadur Shah (Nepali: गोविन्द बहादुर शाह) is a Nepalese politician. He was elected to the Pratinidhi Sabha in the 1999 election on behalf of the Nepali Congress. Shah was the NC candidate in the Achham-1 constituency for the 2008 Constituent Assembly election.
