= Ram Bahadur Bista =

Nepalese politician

- रामबहादुर बिष्ट

Member of Parliament, Pratinidhi Sabha
- In office 4 March 2018 – 18 September 2022
- Constituency: Party list (Nepali Congress)
- In office 28 April 2006 – 16 January 2008
- Preceded by: Himself (2002)
- Succeeded by: Sharad Singh Bhandari (as Member of the Constituent Assembly)
- Constituency: Achham 2
- In office 23 June 1999 – 22 May 2002
- Preceded by: Bhim Bahadur Kathayat
- Succeeded by: Himself (2006)
- Constituency: Achham 2
- In office 20 June 1991 – 11 July 1994
- Preceded by: Constituency established
- Succeeded by: Constituency abolished
- Constituency: Achham 3

Personal details
- Born: 30 January 1953 (age 73)
- Party: Nepali Congress

Ram Bahadur Bista (Nepali: रामबहादुर बिष्ट) is a Nepalese politician. He was elected to the Pratinidhi Sabha in the 1999 election on behalf of the Nepali Congress. Bista was the Nepali Congress candidate in the Achham-2 constituency for the 2008 Constituent Assembly election.
