= Bannigadi Jayagad Rural Municipality =

Bannigadi Jayagad Rural Municipality बान्नीगढी जयगढ गाउँपालिका
- Rural Municipality
- बान्नीगढी जयगढ गाउँपालिका
- Coordinates: 29.1892°N 81.3002°E
- Country: Nepal
- Province: Sudurpashchim Province
- District: Achham District

Government
  - Type: Local government
  - Chairperson: Rajendra B. Khadka
  - Administrative Head: Saiesh Raj Dhungana

Area
  - Total: 58.26 km^{2} (22.49 sq mi)

Population (2011 census)
  - Total: 17,359
  - Density: 298.0/km^{2} (771.7/sq mi)
- Time zone: UTC+05:45 (Nepal Standard Time)
- Website: https://bannigadhijaygadhmun.gov.np

Bannigadi Jayagad (Nepali: बान्नीगढी जयगढ) is a Gaupalika (Nepali: गाउँपालिका, romanized: gaupalika) in Achham District in the Sudurpashchim Province of far-western Nepal. Bannigadi Jayagad has a population of 17359.The land area is 58.26 km^{2}. This municipality was formed on March 10, 2017 (फागुन २७, २०७३) by merging the former Village Development Committees of Gajra, Janalikot, Bardadevi, Timilsen, Kalika, and Darna.

== Demographics ==
At the time of the 2011 Nepal census, Bannigadhi Jayagad Rural Municipality had a population of 17,426. Of these, 83.4% spoke Nepali, 16.5% Achhami and 0.1% other languages as their first language.

In terms of ethnicity/caste, 60.9% were Chhetri, 24.1% other Dalit, 6.2% Hill Brahmin, 3.9% Damai/Dholi, 2.1% Thakuri, 1.3% Kami, 0.5% Lohar, 0.2% Bhote, 0.2% Newar, 0.1% Sarki, 0.1% Tamang, 0.1% other Terai and 0.3% others.

In terms of religion, 99.7% were Hindu and 0.3% Buddhist.

In terms of literacy, 61.4% could read and write, 1.1% could only read and 37.4% could neither read nor write.
