= Dhakari Rural Municipality =

Dhankari Rural Municipality ढँकारी गाउँपालिका
- Rural Municipality
- ढँकारी गाउँपालिका
- Coordinates: 28.9756°N 81.2296°E
- Country: Nepal
- Province: Sudurpashchim Province
- District: Achham District

Government
  - Type: Local government

Area
  - Total: 227.88 km^{2} (87.98 sq mi)

Population (2011 census)
  - Total: 21,562
  - Density: 94.620/km^{2} (245.06/sq mi)
- Time zone: UTC+05:45 (Nepal Standard Time)
- Website: http://dhakarimun.gov.np

Dhankari (Nepali: ढँकारी) is a Gaupalika (Nepali: गाउपालिका, romanized: gaupalika) in Achham District in the Sudurpashchim Province of far-western Nepal. Dhankari has a population of 21562.The land area is 227.88 km^{2}.

== Demographics ==
At the time of the 2011 Nepal census, Dhankari Rural Municipality had a population of 21,570. Of these, 95.9% spoke Nepali, 3.5% Achhami, 0.4% Magar, 0.1% Maithili and 0.1% other languages as their first language.

In terms of ethnicity/caste, 54.5% were Chhetri, 14.7% other Dalit, 13.9% Kami, 11.2% Hill Brahmin, 2.2% Thakuri, 1.9% Damai/Dholi, 0.6% Badi, 0.4% Magar, 0.2% Sanyasi/Dasnami, 0.2% Sarki and 0.1% others.

In terms of religion, 99.8% were Hindu, 0.1% Christian and 0.1% others.

In terms of literacy, 46.8% could read and write, 6.4% could only read and 46.7% could neither read nor write.
