= Mellekh Rural Municipality =

Mellekh Rural Municipality, Achham मेल्लेख गाउँपालिका, अछाम
- Rural Municipality
- नेपालको नक्शामा मेल्लेख गाउँपालिका
- Coordinates: 29.2625°N 81.3209°E
- Country: Nepal
- Province: Sudurpashchim Province
- District: Achham District
- Established: 2073/11/27

Government
  - Type: Local government
  - Chairperson: Jawala Singh Saud
  - Administrative head: Hikkmat B. Budha
  - IT Officer: Chandra Prakash Saud

Area
  - Total: 134.78 km^{2} (52.04 sq mi)

Population (2021 census)
  - Total: 22,785
  - Density: 169.05/km^{2} (437.85/sq mi)
- Time zone: UTC+05:45 (Nepal Standard Time)
- Website: http://mellekhmun.gov.np

Mellekh (Nepali: मेल्लेख) is a Gaupalika (Nepali: गाउपालिका, romanized: gaupalika) in Achham District in the Sudurpashchim Province of far-western Nepal. Mellekh has a population of 24670. The land area is 134.78 km^{2}.

== Demographics ==
At the time of the 2011 Nepal census, Mellekh Rural Municipality had a population of 24,728. Of these, 94.4% spoke Achhami, 5.4% Nepali and 0.1% other languages as their first language.

In terms of ethnicity/caste, 72.2% were Chhetri, 14.0% other Dalit, 5.2% Kami, 2.8% Sarki, 1.8% Thakuri, 1.7% Hill Brahmin, 1.7% Damai/Dholi, 0.2% Badi, 0.2% Newar and 0.1% others.

In terms of religion, 99.9% were Hindu.

In terms of literacy, 57.5% could read and write, 4.4% could only read and 38.1% could neither read nor write.
