= Turmakhand Rural Municipality =

Turmakhand Rural Municipality तुर्माखाँद गाउँपालिका
- Rural Municipality
- Location within Nepal
- Coordinates: 28.906°N 81.430°E
- Country: Nepal
- Province: Sudurpashchim Province
- District: Achham District

Government
  - Type: Local government
  - Chairperson: Dambar Bahadur BC
  - Administration Head: लोक बहादुर शाही (chief administrative officer)

Area
  - Total: 232.07 km^{2} (89.60 sq mi)

Population (2021 census)
  - Total: 24,440
  - Density: 105.3/km^{2} (272.8/sq mi)
- Time zone: UTC+05:45 (Nepal Standard Time)
- Website: Official website

Turmakhand (Nepali: तुर्माखाँद) is a Rural Municipality in Achham District in the Sudurpashchim Province of far-western Nepal. Turmakhand has the population of 24,940. The area of Turmakhand is 232.07 km^{2}.

It was formed by merging Bhairabsthan, Turmakhad, Nada, Raniban, Toshi and Dhamali VDCs.

The municipality was declared Chau Goth free in 2019 which is a tradition where women are forced to stay in a barn during her mensuration cycle.

== Demographics ==
At the time of the 2011 Nepal census, Turmakhand Rural Municipality had a population of 24,782. Of these, 99.4% spoke Nepali, 0.5% Magar and 0.1% other languages as their first language.

In terms of ethnicity/caste, 46.8% were Chhetri, 14.3% Hill Brahmin, 14.1% Kami, 10.2% other Dalit, 7.5% Thakuri, 4.9% Damai/Dholi, 1.2% Majhi, 0.8% Magar, 0.1% Sarki and 0.2% others.

In terms of religion, 99.8% were Hindu and 0.2% were Buddhist.

In terms of literacy, 50.8% could read and write, 4.0% could only read, and 45.2% could neither read nor write.
