= Sanphebagar =

Sanfebagar साँफेबगर
- Municipality
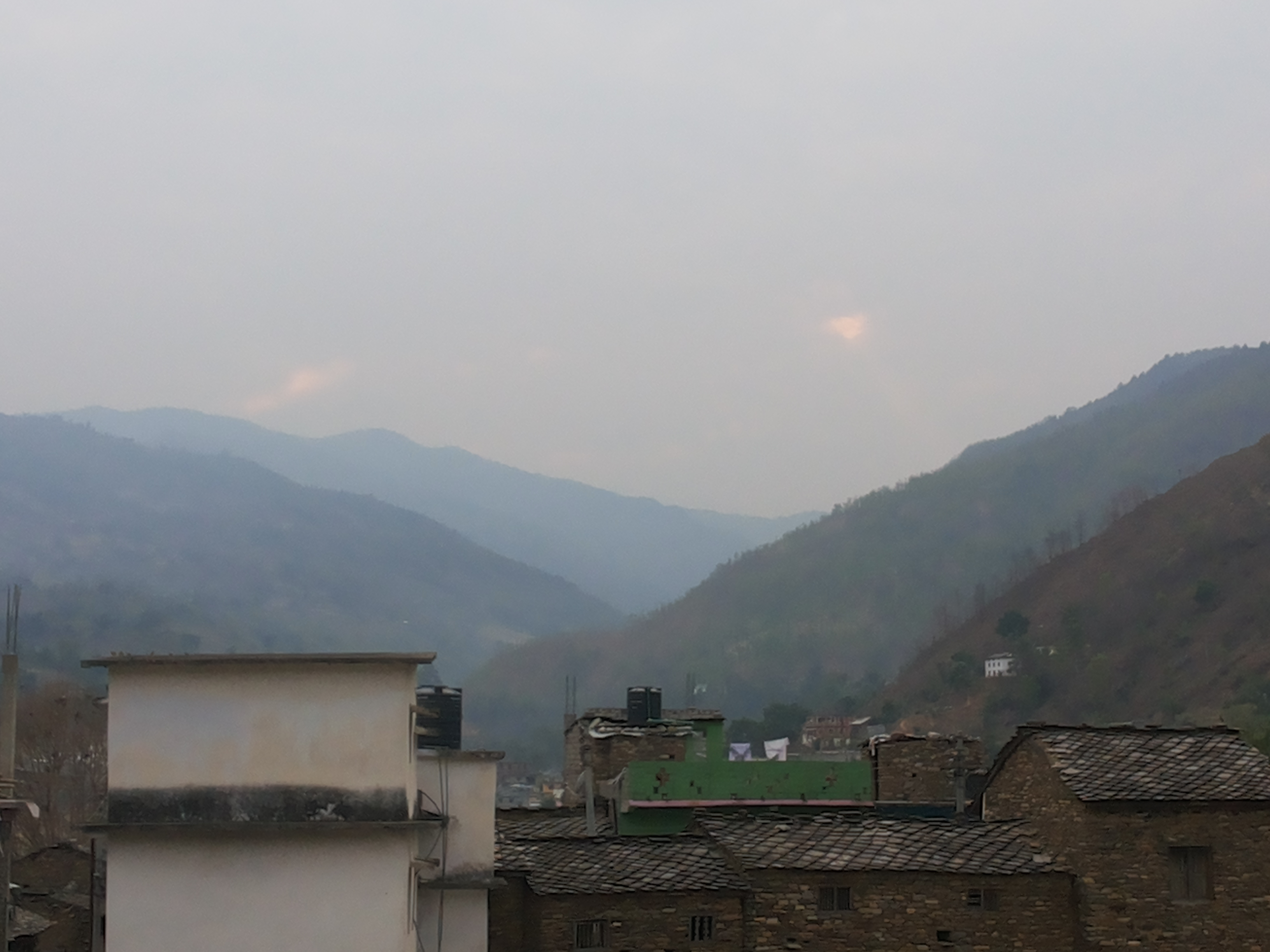
- View of Sanphebagar, Achham
- Nickname: साँफे
- Location in Nepal Sanfebagar (Nepal)
- Coordinates: 29°14′00″N 81°13′05″E
- Country: Nepal
- Province: Sudurpashchim
- District: Achham
- Established Date: 8 May 2014

Government
  - Type: Municipality
  - Mayor: Rajendra Bahadur Kunwar (NC)
  - Deputy Mayor: Siloj Kunwar (CPN (US))

Languages
  - Local: Achhami
- Time zone: UTC+5:45 (NST)
- Website: http://sanfebagarmun.gov.np

Sanphebagar is a municipality in Achham District in Sudurpashchim Province of Nepal that was established on 18 May 2014 by merging the two former Village development committees Baijinath, Jalapadevi, Siddheswar, Mastamandau, Nawathana, Bhagyeshwar, Ridikot, Chandika. It lies on the bank of Budhi Ganga River. At the time of the 2011 Nepal census it had a population of 33,788 people living in 6,693 individual households. Sanphebagar is about 25 km north of the district headquarters of Mangalsen.

== Demographics ==
At the time of the 2011 Nepal census, Sanphebagar Municipality had a population of 34,128. Of these, 89.2% spoke Achhami, 9.0% Nepali, 0.3% Bajureli, 0.3% Maithili, 0.2% Doteli, 0.2% Tharu, 0.1% Hindi, 0.1% Kham, 0.1% Magar, 0.1% Tamang, 0.1% Urdu and 0.2% other languages as their first language.

In terms of ethnicity/caste, 57.2% were Chhetri, 17.9% other Dalit, 9.7% Kami, 5.2% Hill Brahmin, 4.5% Damai/Dholi, 1.4% Sarki, 0.8% Thakuri, 0.6% Teli, 0.5% Musalman, 0.3% Magar, 0.3% Sanyasi/Dasnami, 0.2% Badi, 0.2% Rai, 0.2% Tharu, 0.1% Bengali, 0.1% Terai Brahmin, 0.1% Lohar, 0.1% Newar, 0.1% Tamang, 0.1% other Terai and 0.3% others.

In terms of religion, 99.0% were Hindu, 0.5% Muslim, 0.3% Christian, 0.1% Buddhist and 0.1% others.

In terms of literacy, 64.9% could read and write, 3.8% could only read and 31.3% could neither read nor write.

== Transportation ==
Sanphebagar Airport was out of operation since 2005. On 14 October 2018 flights resumed after 13 years from the initiatives of former mayor Kul Bahadur Kunwar.
