= Ramaroshan Rural Municipality =

Ramaroshan Rural Municipality रामारोशन गाउँपालिका
- Rural Municipality
- नेपालको नक्शामा रामारोशन गाउँपालिका
- Coordinates: 29.2035°N 81.4214°E
- Country: Nepal
- Province: Sudurpashchim Province
- District: Achham District

Government
  - Type: Local government
  - Chairperson: Jhankar B. Saud
  - Administrative Head: Ram Bahadur Bhandari

Area
  - Total: 173.33 km^{2} (66.92 sq mi)

Population (2053 census)
  - Total: 25,166
  - Density: 145.19/km^{2} (376.04/sq mi)
- Time zone: UTC+05:45 (Nepal Standard Time)
- Website: http://ramaroshanmun.gov.np

Ramaroshan (Nepali: रामारोशन) is a Gaupalika (Nepali: गाउपालिका, romanized: gaupalika) in Achham District in the Sudurpashchim Province of far-western Nepal. Ramaroshan has a population of 25166.The land area is 173.33 km^{2}.

It was formed by merging Malatiko, Chafamandu, Shantada, Batulasain, Samroshan, Bhatakatiya and Sutar VDCs.

== Demographics ==
At the time of the 2011 Nepal census, Ramaroshan Rural Municipality had a population of 25,172. Of these, 95.5% spoke Nepali, 3.4% Achhami, 1.1% Magar and 0.1% other languages as their first language.

In terms of ethnicity/caste, 62.1% were Chhetri, 15.8% other Dalit, 7.3% Hill Brahmin, 5.3% Kami, 3.7% Damai/Dholi, 1.7% Lohar, 1.5% Thakuri, 1.4% Bengali, 1.1% Magar, 0.1% other Terai and 0.1% others.

In terms of religion, 99.4% were Hindu and 0.6% Christian.

In terms of literacy, 55.8% could read and write, 3.7% could only read and 39.7% could neither read nor write.
