= Kamalbazar =

Kamalbazar कमलबजार
- Municipality
- Location in Nepal Kamalbazar (Nepal)
- Coordinates: 29.11°N 81.31°E
- Country: Nepal
- Province: Sudurpashchim
- District: Achham

Government
  - Mayor: Yagya Prasad Dhakal (NC)
  - Deputy Mayor: Sharada Kumari Bist ([CPN-UML])

Population (2011)
  - Total: 23,738
- Time zone: UTC+5:45 (NST)
- Website: kamalbazarmun.gov.np

Kamalbazar (Nepali: कमलबजार) is a municipality in Achham District in Sudurpashchim Province of Nepal that was established on 18 September 2015 by merging the former village development committees Bayala, Dhaku, Birpath, Chalsa, Sera, Muli, Mashtabandali and Kuika.

Kamalbazar is a trade centre for East Achham. It also has a primary health center and some banking facilities, which benefit locals, as they previously had to go the district headquarter Mangalsen to use such services. Wind energy facilities and solar power facilities support the local power supply. Administrative offices are located in the former Bayala.

== Demographics ==
At the time of the 2011 Nepal census, Kamalbazar Municipality had a population of 23,770. Of these, 99.9% spoke Nepali and 0.1% other languages as their first language.

In terms of ethnicity/caste, 48.1% were Chhetri, 18.2% Hill Brahmin, 14.0% other Dalit, 11.6% Kami, 4.8% Thakuri, 2.4% Damai/Dholi, 0.2% Sarki, 0.1% Badi, 0.1% Lohar, 0.1% Majhi, 0.1% Musalman, 0.1% other Terai and 0.1% others.

In terms of religion, 99.8% were Hindu, 0.1% Muslim and 0.1% others.

In terms of literacy, 55.1% could read and write, 3.8% could only read and 41.0% could neither read nor write.

== Transportation ==
Kamalbazar Airport lies in Kamalbazar but is currently out of operation.
