= Mangalsen =

Mangalsen मङ्गलसेन
- Municipality
- Location in Nepal Mangalsen (Nepal)
- Coordinates: 29.13°N 81.21°E
- Country: Nepal
- Province: Sudurpashchim
- District: Achham

Area
  - Total: 1,399 km^{2} (540 sq mi)

Population (2021)
  - Total: 26,557
  - Density: 18.98/km^{2} (49.17/sq mi)
  - Religions: Hindu
- Time zone: UTC+5:45 (NST)

Mangalsen (Nepali: मङ्गलसेन) is a municipality and the capital of Achham District in Sudurpashchim Province, Nepal. It was established on 18 May 2014 by merger of the former Village development committees of Janalibandali, Kuntibandali, Oligaun, Jupu, Kalagaun into its current form. At the time of the 2011 Nepal census it had a population of 32,507 people living in 6,604 individual households.

Mangalsen was a major scene of conflict between Maoist rebels and government forces during the Nepalese Civil War.

== Demographics ==
At the time of the 2011 Nepal census, Mangalsen Municipality had a population of 23,770. Of these, 97.5% spoke Nepali, 0.5% Achhami, 0.1% Doteli, 0.1% Hindi, 0.1% Maithili, 0.1% Tamang, 0.1% Tharu and 1.6% other languages as their first language.

In terms of ethnicity/caste, 47.8% were Chhetri, 16.9% other Dalit, 15.5% Hill Brahmin, 9.9% Kami, 3.6% Damai/Dholi, 1.3% Thakuri, 1.1% Badi, 1.0% Sanyasi/Dasnami, 0.7% Sarki, 0.5% Lohar, 0.5% Tamang, 0.2% Bengali, 0.2% Musalman, 0.2% Tharu, 0.1% Kurmi, 0.1% Magar, 0.1% Teli, 0.1% other Terai and 0.2% others.

In terms of religion, 99.5% were Hindu, 0.2% Buddhist, 0.2% Muslim and 0.1% Christian.

In terms of literacy, 57.6% could read and write, 2.6% could only read and 39.8% could neither read nor write.

The population of the municipality declined to 26,557 at the 2021 Nepal census. Around 99.9% of the residents were Nepali citizens and 72.9% were literate in 2021.
