= Chaurpati Rural Municipality =

Chaurpati Rural Municipality चौरपाटी गाउँपालिका
- Rural Municipality
- नेपालको नक्शामा चौरपाटी गाउँपालिका
- Coordinates: 29.1818°N 81.1290°E
- Country: Nepal
- Province: Sudurpashchim Province
- District: Achham District

Government
  - Type: Local government

Area
  - Total: 182.16 km^{2} (70.33 sq mi)

Population (2011 census)
  - Total: 25,149
  - Density: 138.06/km^{2} (357.57/sq mi)
- Time zone: UTC+05:45 (Nepal Standard Time)
- Website: http://chaurpatimun.gov.np

Chaurpati (Nepali: चौरपाटी) is a Gaupalika (Nepali: गाउपालिका ; gaupalika) in Achham District in the Sudurpashchim Province of far-western Nepal. Chaurpati has a population of 25149.The land area is 182.16 km^{2} (70.33 sq mi).

It was formed by merging Siudi, Sokot, Payal, Lunnga, Marku and Duni VDSs. Currently, it is divided into 7 administrative wards.

== Demographics ==
At the time of the 2011 Nepal census, Chaurpati Rural Municipality had a population of 25,215. Of these, 96.7% spoke Achhami, 1.9% Nepali, 1.1% Doteli, 0.1% Magar, 0.1% Maithili, 0.1% Santali and 0.1% other languages as their first language.

In terms of ethnicity/caste, 62.4% were Chhetri, 21.5% other Dalit, 6.9% Kami, 4.5% Hill Brahmin, 2.1% Thakuri, 1.5% Damai/Dholi, 0.5% Badi, 0.3% Lohar, 0.1% Kalwar, 0.1% Magar, 0.1% Tamang and 0.2% others.

In terms of religion, 99.8% were Hindu, 0.1% Buddhist and 0.1% Christian.

In terms of literacy, 50.2% could read and write, 4.5% could only read and 45.3% could neither read nor write.
