= 2001 Nepal census =

10th national census of Nepal

2001 Nepal Census
- 2001

General information
- Country: Nepal
- Authority: Central Bureau of Statistics
- Website: www.cbs.gov.np

Results
- Total population: 23,151,423 (▲25.20%)
- Most populous Development Region: Central (8,031,629)
- Least populous Development Region: Far-Western (2,191,330)

The 2001 Nepal census (Nepali: राष्ट्रिय जनगणना २०५८) was the 10th national census of Nepal. It was conducted by Central Bureau of Statistics. According to the census, the population of Nepal in 2001 was 23,151,423.

Working with Nepal's Village Development Committees at the district level, data was recorded from all the main towns and villages of each district of Nepal. The data included statistics on population size, households, sex and age distribution, place of birth, residence characteristics, literacy, marital status, religion, language spoken, caste/ethnic group, economically active population, education, number of children, employment status, and occupation.

== Enumeration challenges ==
During the 2001 Nepal census, the field enumeration was significantly disrupted by political instability and the ongoing Maoist insurgency (Nepalese Civil War), resulting in incomplete data collection in many parts of the country. Due to the Maoist insurgency, the census staff were unable to carry out enumeration in 957 wards (including two urban wards) across 12 districts, leading to gaps in the official household and population counts. In 83 Village Development Committees (VDCs), complete enumeration was not possible and 747 wards were entirely affected, while additional wards in other VDCs and municipalities were partially impacted. In particularly hard-hit districts such as Salyan and Kalikot, even the basic household listing was interrupted. The population figures for affected areas were estimated based on partial listings and demographic estimation procedures rather than full enumeration.

== Key findings ==
The key findings of 2001 census are as follows:

Total population	23,151,423
Intercensal change	4,660,326
Intercensal change percentage	25.20%
Annual growth rate	2.25%
Population density (per km^{2})	157.3
Male population	11,563,921
Female population	11,587,502
Gender ratio	99.8
Literacy rate	54.1%

Out of the total population figure, 22,738,934 represents the enumerated population, while 414,489 represents the estimated population from areas where enumeration was affected.

== Population distribution ==
Population by ecological region (2001)
Ecological region	Population	Percentage (%)	Sex ratio	Annual growth rate (%)	Density (per km^{2})
Mountain	1,687,859	7.3	98.39	1.57	32.57
Hill	10,251,111	44.3	95.84	1.97	167.11
Terai	11,212,453	48.4	103.77	2.62	329.59
Nepal	23,151,423	100	99.80	2.25	157.30

Population by development region (2001)
Development region	Population	Percentage (%)	Sex ratio	Annual growth rate (%)	Density (per km^{2})
Eastern	5,344,476	23.09	100	1.84	187.82
Central	8,031,629	34.69	105	2.61	293.02
Western	4,571,013	19.74	93	1.92	155.49
Mid-Western	3,012,975	13.01	99	2.26	71.10
Far-Western	2,191,330	9.47	98	2.70	112.15
Nepal	23,151,423	100	100	2.25	157.30

== Population by district ==
Population by district
S.N	Eco-Development Region (Note: Development regions further sub-divided according to ecological belts.)	District	Population	Sex ratio	Annual growth rate (%)	Density (per km^{2})
1	Eastern Mountain	Taplejung	134,698	97	1.15	37
2	Eastern Mountain	Sankhuwasabha	159,203	96	1.15	46
3	Eastern Mountain	Solukhumbu	107,686	98	1.02	33
4	Eastern Hill	Panchthar	202,056	96	1.43	163
5	Eastern Hill	Ilam	282,806	101	2.10	166
6	Eastern Hill	Dhankuta	166,479	97	1.29	187
7	Eastern Hill	Tehrathum	113,111	94	0.95	167
8	Eastern Hill	Bhojpur	203,018	93	0.21	135
9	Eastern Hill	Okhaldhunga	156,702	93	1.17	146
10	Eastern Hill	Khotang	231,385	95	0.69	145
11	Eastern Hill	Udayapur	287,689	100	2.63	139
12	Eastern Tarai	Jhapa (Note: Districts where enumeration was affected.)	688,109	99	1.48	428
13	Eastern Tarai	Morang	843,220	101	2.23	455
14	Eastern Tarai	Sunsari	625,633	102	3.00	498
15	Eastern Tarai	Saptari	570,282	104	2.03	418
16	Eastern Tarai	Siraha	572,399	106	2.17	482
17	Central Mountain	Dolakha	204,229	96	1.65	93
18	Central Mountain	Sindhupalchok	305,857	99	1.59	120
19	Central Mountain	Rasuwa	44,731	109	1.97	29
20	Central Hill	Sindhuli	279,821	99	2.23	112
21	Central Hill	Ramechhap	212,408	90	1.22	137
22	Central Hill	Kavrepalanchok	385,672	96	1.73	276
23	Central Hill	Lalitpur	337,785	104	2.73	877
24	Central Hill	Bhaktapur	225,461	104	2.65	1,895
25	Central Hill	Kathmandu	1,081,845	114	4.71	2,739
26	Central Hill	Nuwakot	288,478	98	1.62	257
27	Central Hill	Dhading	338,658	96	1.97	176
28	Central Hill	Makwanpur	392,604	103	2.22	162
29	Central Terai	Dhanusa	671,364	109	2.11	569
30	Central Terai	Mahottari	553,481	108	2.29	552
31	Central Terai	Sarlahi	635,701	107	2.55	505
32	Central Terai	Rautahat	545,132	107	2.75	484
33	Central Terai	Bara	559,135	107	2.96	470
34	Central Terai	Parsa	497,219	110	2.89	367
35	Central Terai	Chitwan	472,048	99	2.86	213
36	Western Mountain	Manang	9,587	111	5.81	4
37	Western Mountain	Mustang	14,981	120	0.47	4
38	Western Hill	Gorkha	288,134	87	1.32	80
39	Western Hill	Lamjung	177,149	89	1.42	105
40	Western Hill	Tanahun	315,237	87	1.62	204
41	Western Hill	Syangja	317,320	83	0.78	273
42	Western Hill	Kaski	380,527	95	2.62	189
43	Western Hill	Myagdi	114,447	87	1.29	50
44	Western Hill	Parbat	157,826	86	0.95	319
45	Western Hill	Baglung	268,937	85	1.46	151
46	Western Hill	Gulmi	296,654	82	1.08	258
47	Western Hill	Palpa	268,558	87	1.28	196
48	Western Hill	Arghakhanchi	208,391	86	1.42	175
49	Western Terai	Nawalparasi	562,870	98	2.55	260
50	Western Terai	Rupandehi	708,419	104	3.05	521
51	Western Terai	Kapilvastu	481,976	106	2.60	277
52	Mid-Western Mountain	Dolpa	29,545	99	1.67	4
53	Mid-Western Mountain	Jumla	89,427	105	1.63	35
54	Mid-Western Mountain	Kalikot	105,580	102	1.73	61
55	Mid-Western Mountain	Mugu	43,937	103	1.89	12
56	Mid-Western Mountain	Humla	40,595	107	1.66	7
57	Mid-Western Hill	Pyuthan	212,484	86	1.91	162
58	Mid-Western Hill	Rolpa	210,004	94	1.56	112
59	Mid-Western Hill	Rukum	188,438	103	1.92	65
60	Mid-Western Hill	Salyan	213,500	100	1.61	146
61	Mid-Western Hill	Surkhet	288,527	98	2.45	118
62	Mid-Western Hill	Dailekh	225,201	96	1.84	150
63	Mid-Western Hill	Jajarkot	134,868	103	1.68	60
64	Mid-Western Terai	Dang	462,380	98	2.66	156
65	Mid-Western Terai	Banke	385,840	106	3.01	165
66	Mid-Western Terai	Bardiya	382,649	101	2.76	189
67	Far-Western Mountain	Bajura	108,781	98	1.67	50
68	Far-Western Mountain	Bajhang	167,026	93	1.83	49
69	Far-Western Mountain	Darchula	121,996	96	1.82	53
70	Far-Western Hill	Achham	231,285	89	1.54	138
71	Far-Western Hill	Doti	207,066	100	2.14	102
72	Far-Western Hill	Dadeldhura	126,162	94	1.87	82
73	Far-Western Hill	Baitadi	234,418	94	1.55	154
74	Far-Western Terai	Kailali	616,697	103	3.89	191
75	Far-Western Terai	Kanchanpur	377,899	103	3.82	235
Nepal			23,151,423	100	2.25	157

== Population by caste/ethnicity ==
Population by caste/ethnicity (2001)
S.N.	Caste/ethnicity	Population (enumerated figures only)	Percentage (%)
1	Kshetri/Chhetri	3,593,496	15.80
2	Brahmin-Hill (Bahun)	2,896,477	12.74
3	Magar	1,622,421	7.14
4	Tharu	1,533,879	6.75
5	Tamang	1,282,304	5.64
6	Newar	1,245,232	5.48
7	Muslim	971,056	4.27
8	Kami	895,954	3.94
9	Yadav	895,423	3.94
10	Rai	635,151	2.79
11	Gurung	543,571	2.39
12	Damai/Dholi	390,305	1.72
13	Limbu	359,379	1.58
14	Thakuri	334,120	1.47
15	Sarki	318,989	1.40
16	Teli	304,536	1.34
17	Chamar/Harijan/Ram	269,661	1.19
18	Koiri	251,274	1.11
19	Kurmi	212,842	0.94
20	Sanyasi	199,127	0.88
21	Dhanuk	188,150	0.83
22	Musahar	172,434	0.76
23	Dushad/Paswan/Pasi	158,525	0.70
24	Sherpa	154,622	0.68
25	Sonar	145,088	0.64
26	Kewat	136,953	0.60
27	Brahmin-Terai	134,496	0.59
28	Baniya	126,971	0.56
29	Gharti/Bhujel	117,568	0.52
30	Mallaha	115,968	0.51
31	Kalwar	115,606	0.51
32	Kumal	99,389	0.44
33	Hajam/Thakur	98,169	0.43
34	Kanu	95,826	0.42
35	Rajbanshi	95,812	0.42
36	Sunuwar	95,524	0.42
37	Sudhi	89,846	0.40
38	Lohar	82,367	0.36
39	Tatma	76,512	0.34
40	Khatwe	74,972	0.33
41	Dhobi	73,413	0.32
42	Majhi	72,614	0.32
43	Nuniya	66,873	0.29
44	Kumhar	54,413	0.24
45	Danuwar	53,229	0.23
46	Chepang(Praja)	52,237	0.23
47	Halwai	50,585	0.22
48	Rajput	48,454	0.21
49	Kayastha	46,071	0.20
50	Badahi	45,975	0.20
51	Marwadi	43,971	0.19
52	Santhal/Satar	42,698	0.19
53	Dhagar/Jhangar	41,764	0.18
54	Bantar	35,839	0.16
55	Barae	35,434	0.16
56	Kahar	34,531	0.15
57	Gangai	31,318	0.14
58	Lodha	24,738	0.11
59	Rajbhar	24,263	0.11
60	Thami	22,999	0.10
61	Dhimal	19,537	0.09
62	Bhote	19,261	0.08
63	Bind/Binda	18,720	0.08
64	Bhediya/Gaderi	17,729	0.08
65	Nurang	17,522	0.08
66	Yakkha	17,003	0.07
67	Darai	14,589	0.07
68	Tajpuriya	13,250	0.06
69	Thakali	12,973	0.06
70	Chidimar	12,296	0.05
71	Pahari	11,505	0.05
72	Mali	11,390	0.05
73	Bengali	9,860	0.04
74	Chhantel	9,814	0.04
75	Dom	8,931	0.04
76	Kamar	8,761	0.04
77	Bote	7,969	0.04
78	Brahmu/Baramu	7,383	0.03
79	Gaine	5,887	0.03
80	Jirel	5,316	0.02
81	Adibasi/Janajati	5,259	0.02
82	Dura	5,169	0.02
83	Churaute	4,893	0.02
84	Badi	4,442	0.02
85	Meche	3,763	0.02
86	Lepcha	3,660	0.02
87	Halkhor	3,621	0.02
88	Punjabi/Sikh	3,054	0.01
89	Kisan	2,876	0.01
90	Raji	2,399	0.01
91	Byansi	2,103	0.01
92	Hayu	1,821	0.01
93	Koche	1,429	0.01
94	Dhuniya	1,231	0.01
95	Walung	1,148	0.01
96	Jain	1,015	0.00
97	Munda	660	0.00
98	Raute	658	0.00
99	Hyalmo	579	0.00
100	Patharkatta/Kushwadiya	552	0.00
101	Kusunda	164	0.00
102	Dalit-unidentified	173,401	0.76
103	Caste/ethnicity-unidentified	231,641	1.02
Total		22,736,934	100

== Population by language ==
Languages by number of native speakers (2001)
S.N.	Language	Number of speakers (enumerated figures only)	Percentage (%)
1	Nepali	11,053,255	48.61
2	Maithili	2,797,582	12.30
3	Bhojpuri	1,712,536	7.53
4	Tharu (Dagaura/Rana)	1,331,546	5.86
5	Tamang	1,179,145	5.19
6	Newar	825,458	3.63
7	Magar	770,116	3.39
8	Awadhi	560,744	2.47
9	Bantawa	371,056	1.63
10	Gurung	338,925	1.49
11	Limbu	333,633	1.47
12	Bajjika	237,947	1.05
13	Urdu	174,840	0.77
14	Rajbanshi	129,829	0.57
15	Sherpa	129,771	0.57
16	Hindi	105,765	0.47
17	Chamling	44,093	0.19
18	Santhali	40,260	0.18
19	Chepang	36,807	0.16
20	Danuwar	31,849	0.14
21	Jhangar/Dhangar	28,615	0.13
22	Sunuwar	26,611	0.12
23	Bengali/Bangla	23,602	0.10
24	Marwari (Rajsthani)	22,637	0.10
25	Majhi	21,841	0.10
26	Thami	18,991	0.08
27	Kulung	18,686	0.08
28	Dhimal	17,308	0.08
29	Angika	15,892	0.07
30	Yakkha	14,648	0.06
31	Thulung	14,034	0.06
32	Sangpang	10,810	0.05
33	Bhujel/ khawas	10,733	0.05
34	Darai	10,210	0.04
35	Khaling	9,288	0.04
36	Kumal	6,533	0.03
37	Thakali	6,441	0.03
38	Chhantyal/Chhantel	5,912	0.03
39	Nepali Sign Language	5,743	0.03
40	Tibetan	5,277	0.02
41	Dumi	5,271	0.02
42	Jirel	4,919	0.02
43	Wambule/Umbule	4,471	0.02
44	Puma	4,310	0.02
45	Yholmo	3,986	0.02
46	Nachhiring	3,553	0.02
47	Dura	3,397	0.01
48	Meche	3,301	0.01
49	Pahari	2,995	0.01
50	Lepcha/Lapche	2,826	0.01
51	Bote	2,823	0.01
52	Bahing	2,765	0.01
53	Koi/Koyu	2,641	0.01
54	Raji	2,413	0.01
55	Hayu	1,743	0.01
56	Byangshi	1,734	0.01
57	Yamphu/ Yamphe	1,722	0.01
58	Ghale	1,649	0.01
59	Khariya	1,575	0.01
60	Chhiling	1,314	0.01
61	Lohorung	1,207	0.01
62	Punjabi	1,165	0.01
63	Chinese	1,101	0.00
64	English	1,037	0.00
65	Mewahang	904	0.00
66	Sanskrit	823	0.00
67	Kaike	794	0.00
68	Raute	518	0.00
69	Kisan	489	0.00
70	Churauti	408	0.00
71	Baram/ Maramu	342	0.00
72	Tilung	310	0.00
73	Jero/ Jerung	271	0.00
74	Dungmali	221	0.00
75	Oriya	159	0.00
76	Lingkhim	97	0.00
77	Kusunda	87	0.00
78	Sindhi	72	0.00
79	Koche	72	0.00
80	Hariyanvi	33	0.00
81	Magahi	30	0.00
82	Sam	23	0.00
83	Kurmali	13	0.00
84	Kagate	10	0.00
85	Dzonkha	9	0.00
86	Kuki	9	0.00
87	Chhintang	8	0.00
88	Mizo	8	0.00
89	Nagamese	6	0.00
90	Lhomi	4	0.00
91	Assamese	3	0.00
92	Sadhani	2	0.00
93	Unknown Language	168,340	0.74
Total		22,736,934	100

Languages by number of second-language speakers (2001)
S.N	Language	Number of speakers (enumerated figures only)	Percentage (%)
1	Nepali	5,722,151	25.17
2	Maithili	115,877	0.51
3	Bantawa	71,713	0.32
4	Bhojpuri	64,724	0.28
5	Tharu	64,274	0.28
6	Magar	49,378	0.22
7	Tamang	46,078	0.20
8	Limbu	35,272	0.16
9	Newar	34,431	0.15
10	Gurung	29,655	0.13
11	Awadhi	23,577	0.10
12	Bajjika	7,612	0.03
Others		632,443	2.78
No second language		15,828,965	69.62
Not reported		10,784	0.05
Total		22,736,934	100

== See also ==
- Census in Nepal
- 1991 Nepal census
- 2011 Nepal census
- 2021 Nepal census
