= Achham District =

Achham अछाम
- District
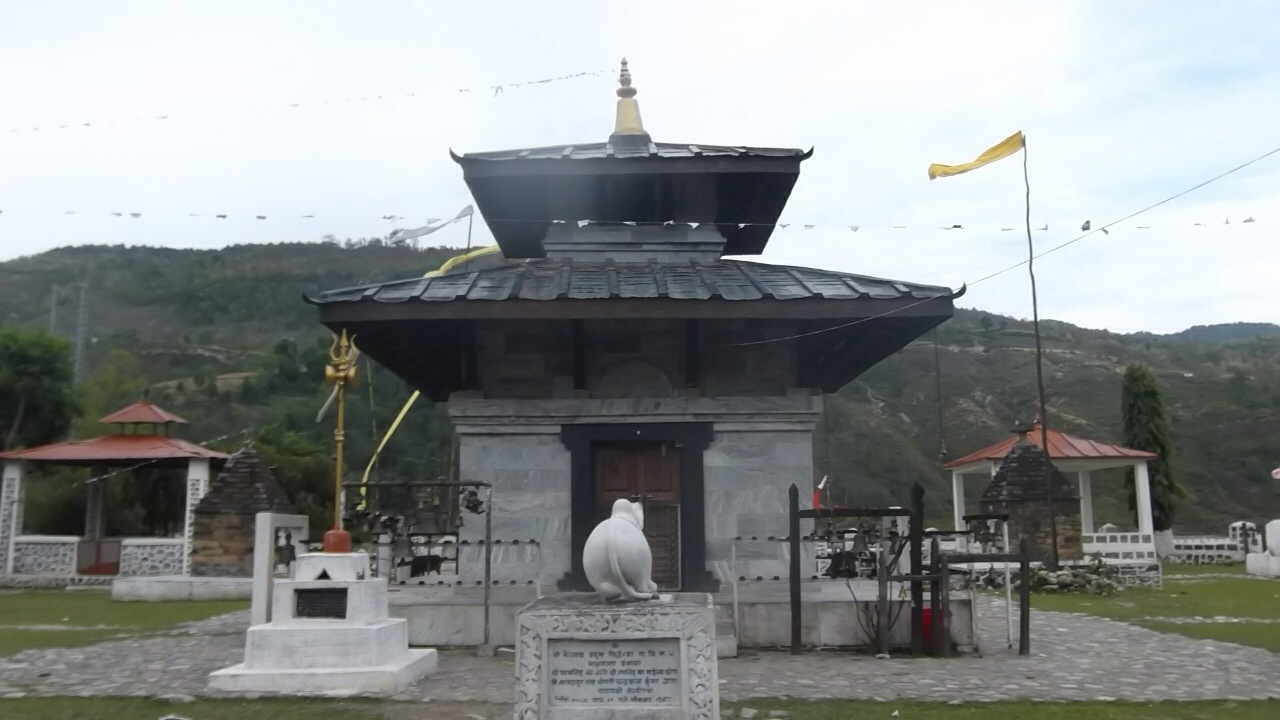
- Baidhyanath Dham

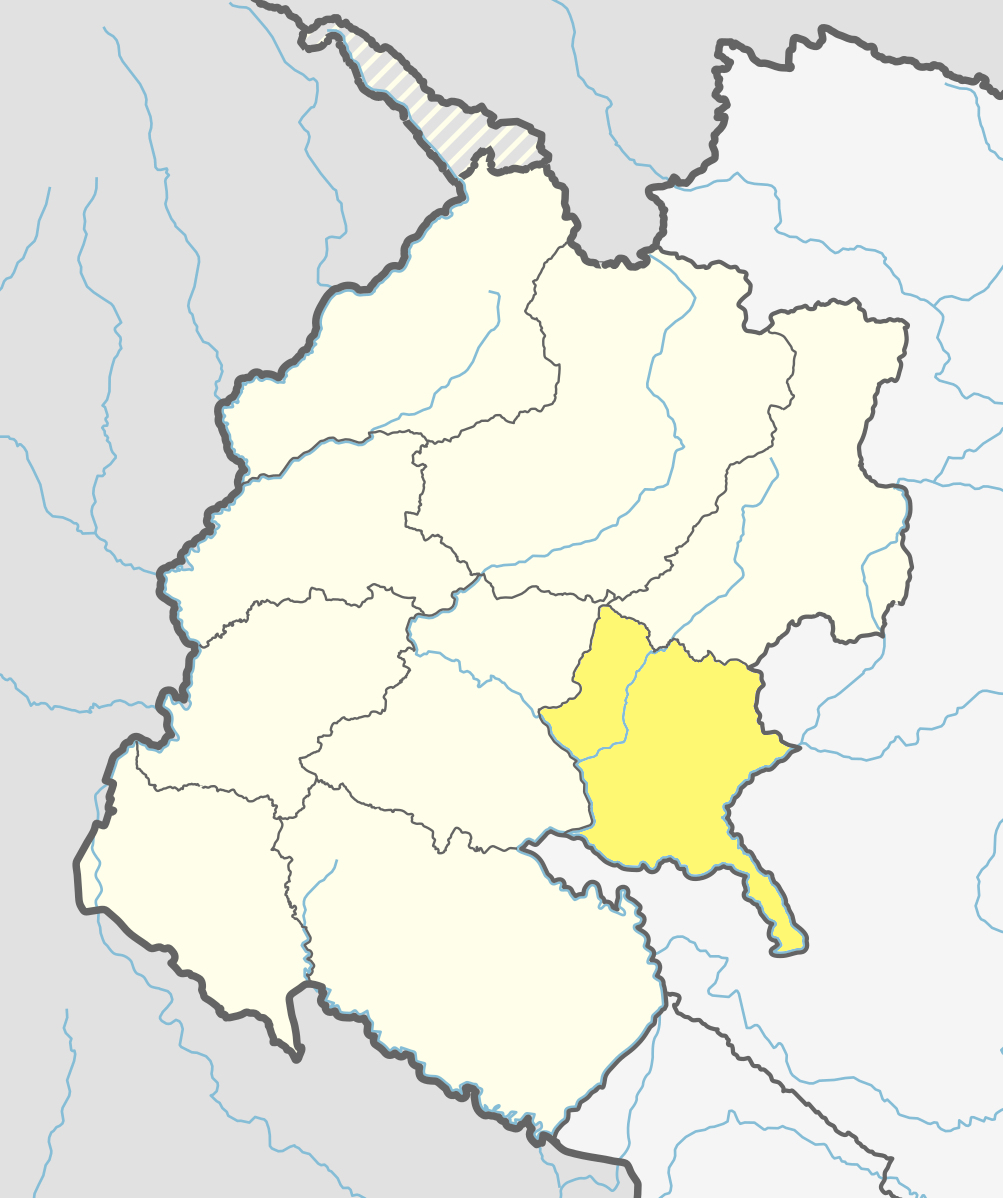
- Location of Achham District
- Coordinates: 29°6′41″N 81°17′56″E
- Country: Nepal
- Province: Sudurpashchim
- Established: 13 April 1961 (Nepali date: Baishakh 1, 2018)
- Admin HQ.: Mangalsen
- Municipality: List: Urban: Mangalsen Kamalbazar Sanfebagar Panchadewal Binayak; Rural: Ramaroshan Chaurpati Turmakhand Mellekh Dhakari Bannigadi Jayagad

Government
  - Type: Coordination committee
  - Body: DCC, Achham

Area
  - Total: 1,692 km^{2} (653 sq mi)

Population (2011)
  - Total: 257,477
  - Density: 152.2/km^{2} (394.1/sq mi)
- Time zone: UTC+05:45 (NPT)
- Website: Official website

Achham (Nepali: अछाम जिल्ला pronounced [ʌt͡sʰam]) is a district located in Sudurpashchim province and one of the seventy-seven districts of Nepal. It is one of the nine districts of the province. The district, with Mangalsen as its district headquarters, covers an area of 1,692 km^{2} and has a population (2011) of 257,477.

== Etymology ==
There are many cultural meaning about the naming of the district but one interesting folklore is that:

.... during Mughal era in India, most people by fear of Mughal moved to this place. That time this place was good in the production of Mangoes, so when people from North India came here, they said: "Accha Aam" (अच्छा आम) (meaning good mangoes in Hindi) and that "Accha Aam" became "Achham" later.

== History ==
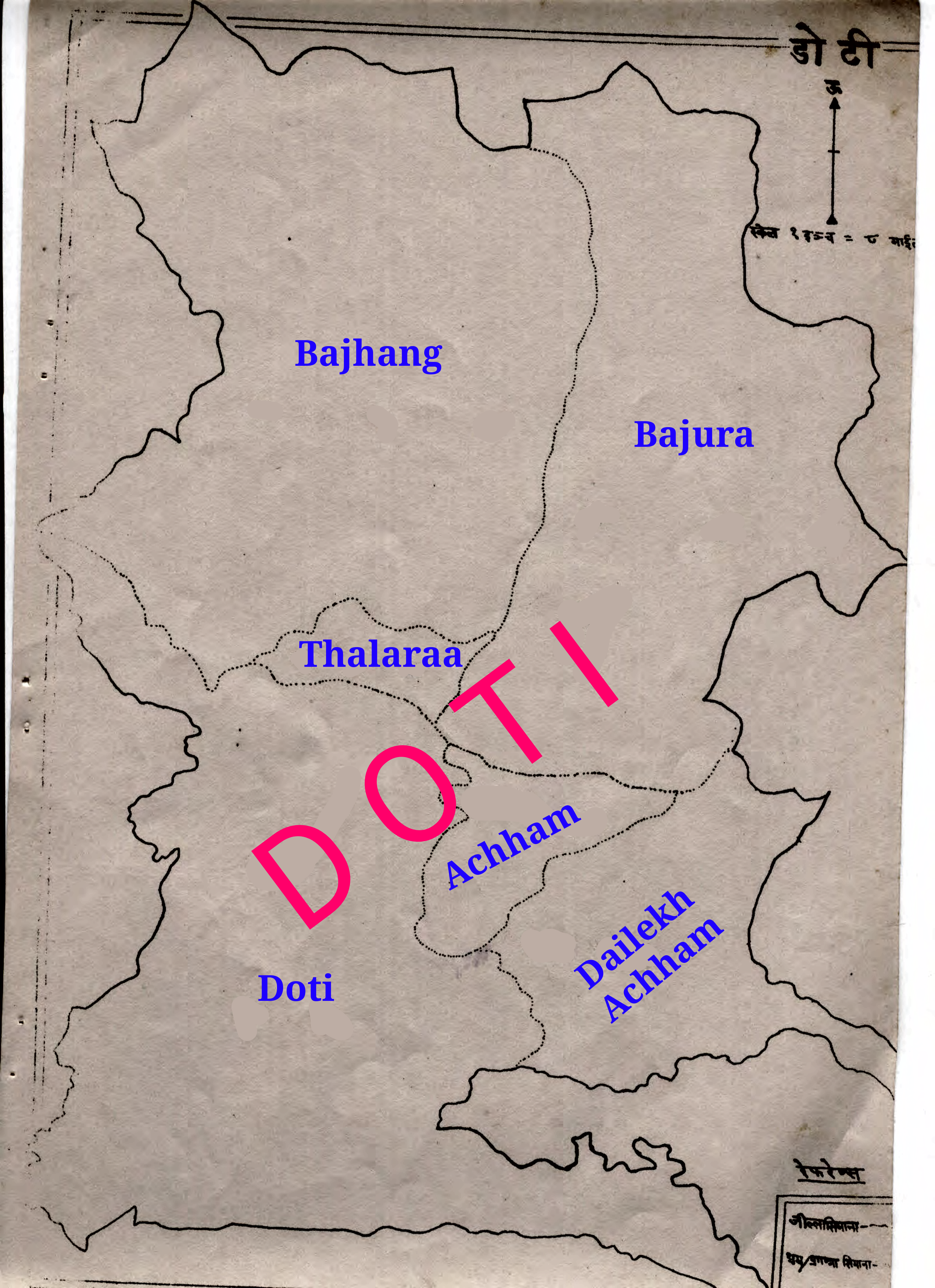
Old Doti District

Madan Singh Thapa was the first king of Achham in the 5th century. Achham was a part of Doti Kingdom during medieval era. Nepal annexed Doti in 1790. It remained part of Doti District until 1961. On 13 April 1961, Achham district carved out from Doti District and declared a separate district

== Geography and Climate ==
Achham covers an area of 1,692 square kilometres (653 sq mi) and located at Latitude: 280°46’ North to 290°23' North and Longitude: 810°32 East to 810°35' East. 90% area of Achham is mid-hill and 10% is high-hill. The maximum elevation of the district is 3,820 metres (12,530 ft) and minimum elevation is 540 metres (1,770 ft) from the sea level. The district is surrounded by Bajura District in the North, Doti District in the West, Dailekh District in the East and Surkhet District in the South.

=== Rivers ===
The district has 31 rivers in total, the main being the Karnali, Seti, Budhiganga, Ekdi khola, Kailash Khola, Lungreligad, Pravaligad, Kashagad, Saranigad, Ardoligad, Talrawa and Barlegad.

Climhiate Zone	Elevation Range	% of Area
Upper Tropical	300 to 1,000 meters 1,000 to 3,300 ft.	27.4%
Subtropical	1,000 to 2,000 meters 3,300 to 6,600 ft.	58.3%
Temperate	2,000 to 3,000 meters 6,400 to 9,800 fters 9,800 to 13,100 ft.	1.0%

== Demographics ==
Historical population
Census year	Pop.	±% p.a.
1981	185,212	—
1991	198,188	+0.68%
2001	231,285	+1.56%
2011	257,477	+1.08%
2021	229,816	−1.13%
Source: Citypopulation

At the time of the 2021 Nepal census, Achham District had a population of 228,852. 10.96% of the population is under 5 years of age. It has a literacy rate of 72.64% and a sex ratio of 1173 females per 1000 males. 99,568 (43.51%) lived in municipalities.

Castes/ethnic groups in Achham district (2021)
1. Chhetri (54.6%)
2. Kami (17.3%)
3. Bahun (9.60%)
4. Damai (8.41%)
5. Thakuri (5.29%)
6. Sarki (2.94%)
7. Hill Janjati (1.13%)
8. Others (0.70%)

Khas people make up a majority of the population with 99% of the population. Chhetris make up 55% of the population, while Khas Dalits make up 29% of the population. Hill Janjatis, mainly Magars, are 1% of the population.

Languages of Achham district (2021)
1. Nepali (57.4%)
2. Achhami (40.4%)
3. Others (2.13%)

At the time of the 2021 census, 57.43% of the population spoke Nepali and 40.44% Achhami as their first language. In 2011, 66.4% of the population spoke Nepali as their first language.

Religion in Achham District (2021)
Religion	Percent
Hinduism	99.14%
Buddhism	0.50%
Other or not stated	0.36%

== Administration ==
The district is administered by District Coordination Committee (Legislative), District Administration Office (Executive) and District Court (Judicial) as follows:

Administration	Name of units	Head
Legislative	District Coordination Committee	
Executive	District Administration Office	Mr. Bhojraj Shreshtha
Judicial	District Court	Mr. Navin Kumar Joshi

== Administrative Divisions ==
Accham is divided into total of ten local level bodies, of which four are urban and six are rural.

#	Name	Nepali	Type	Population (2011)	Area (km^{2})
1	Mangalsen	मङ्गलसेन	municipality	32331	220.14
2	Kamalbazar	कमलबजार	municipality	23738	120.78
3	Sanfebagar	साँफेबगर	municipality	33788	166.71
4	Panchadewal Binayak	पञ्चदेवल	municipality	27485	147.75
5	Ramaroshan	रामारोशन	rural municipality	25,166	173.33
6	Chaurpati	चौरपाटी	rural municipality	25,149	182.16
7	Turmakhand	तुर्माखाँद	rural municipality	24,940	232.07
8	Mellekh	मेल्लेख	rural municipality	24,670	134.78
9	Dhakari	ढँकारी	rural municipality	21,562	227.88
10	Bannigadi Jayagad	बान्नीगडीजैगड	rural municipality	17,359	58.26

== Transportation ==
Achham is one of the remotest districts of Nepal. It is accessible by automobile from Kathmandu and Nepalgunj via a paved road that runs along the western border of Nepal from Dhangadhi. The unpaved road of Mid-Hill Highway through Dailakh district also traverses to Mangalsen by crossing Karnali at Rakam.

Mangalsen, the district headquarters, is an eight-hour walk and a 2.5 hour drive from Sanphebagar – a town in Achham sporting a non-functional domestic airport. A bridge crosses the Budhiganga River in Sanphebagar allowing access during high water, a second bridge over the Kailash River. During 2009/2010, the government of Nepal has constructed a paved road connecting Sanphebagar to Mangalsen. The district is served by two hospitals, the government district hospital in Mangalsen and one recently opened in Bayalpata named Bayalpata Hospital that is a collaboration between the government and the non-profit organization Nyaya Health.

== Education ==
71% of men aged five and above are literate in Achham compared to 75% at the national level, only 43% of such women in the district can read and write (against 57% across Nepal).

== FM radio and newspapers ==
Achham Besd six FM radio and three newspapers are running now.

=== Newspapers ===
- Ramaroshan Daily
- Khaptad News daily
- Miracle weekly

=== FM Radio ===
- Ramaroshan
- Janapriya
- Society
- Achham
- Panchadewol
- Paribartan
- Redio Bannigadhi 93.4
- Sanfebagar Fm

== See also ==
- Panchadewal Binayak
