= Shikhar, Doti =

Shikhar Municipality
- Municipality
- Location within Sudurpashchim Province Location within Nepal
- Coordinates: 29.26°N 80.87°E
- Country: Nepal
- Province: Sudurpashchim
- District: Doti
- No. of wards: 11
- Established: 10 March 2017
- Incorporated (VDC): Kapalleki, Mudhegaun, Mudabhara, Tijali, Pachanali, Latamandau, Jijodamandau, Banalek and Warpata
- Admin HQ.: Pachanali

Government
  - Type: Mayor–council
  - Body: Shikhar Municipality
  - Mayor: Mr. Dirgha Bahadur Balayar (Nepali Congress)
  - Deputy Mayor: Mrs. Sunita Rawal

Area
  - Total: 585.37 km^{2} (226.01 sq mi)

Population (2011)
  - Total: 30,294
- Time zone: UTC+05:45 (NPT)
- Website: shikharmun.gov.np

Shikhar Municipality is a municipality located in Doti District of Sudurpashchim Province of Nepal. It is surrounded by Dipayal Silgadhi in the East, Dadeldhura District in the West, Adarsha in the North and K. I. Singh and Jorayal in the South.

== History ==
On 10 March 2017 Government of Nepal announced 744 local level units as per the new constitution of Nepal 2015. thus this local level unit came into existence. Total area of the municipality is 585.37 square kilometres (226.01 sq mi) and total population of the municipality (according to 2011 Nepal census) is 31801. The municipality is divided into 11 wards. Kapalleki, Mudhegaun, Mudabhara, Tijali, Pachanali, Latamandau, Jijodamandau, Banalek and Warpata villages were merged to form this new local level unit.

== Demographics ==
At the time of the 2011 Nepal census, Shikhar Municipality had a population of 32,326. Of these, 97.8% spoke Doteli, 1.9% Nepali, 0.1% Maithili, 0.1% Bhojpuri and 0.1% other languages as their first language.

In terms of ethnicity/caste, 53.8% were Chhetri, 14.6% Kami, 11.2% Hill Brahmin, 5.2% Damai/Dholi, 4.9% other Dalit, 3.9% Thakuri, 2.1% Lohar, 1.6% Sarki, 0.8% Sanyasi/Dasnami, 0.5% Badi, 0.4% other Terai, 0.3% Newar, 0.2% Musalman, 0.1% Bengali, 0.1% Gurung, 0.1% Chamar/Harijan/Ram, 0.1% Magar and 0.2% others.

In terms of religion, 99.7% were Hindu and 0.2% Muslim.

In terms of literacy, 54.2% could read and write, 2.7% could only read and 43.0% could neither read nor write.
