= Salt, Uttarakhand =

Tehsil and Block in Uttarakhand, India

Sult Salt
- Tehsil and Administrative Block
- Interactive map of Sult
- Location in Uttarakhand, India Sult (India)
- Country: India
- State: Uttarakhand
- Division: Kumaon division
- District: Almora district
- Subdivision: Sult
- Headquarters: Sult

Languages
  - Official: Hindi
  - Native: Kumaoni
- Time zone: UTC+05:30 (IST)
- PIN: 263667
- Vehicle registration: UK-01
- Lok Sabha constituency: Almora
- Vidhan Sabha constituency: Salt

The Salt or Sult (Kumaoni: सल्ट) is a Tehsil and Development block in Almora district of Kumaon division, Uttarakhand, State of India. It is also known as Kumaun Ki Bardoli, a name given to it by Mahatma Gandhi when he visited Almora in 1929. Khumar is a village located in Sult which has a Martyr Monument. It is the region of Kumaun. The accent of the language is Pali-Pachau accent.

== Geography ==
Sult is situated in the Western part of Almora district adjoining the Garhwal region in the Kumaon division of Uttarakhand. The area is predominantly mountainous and rural, with settlements distributed across the surrounding hills and valleys.

== Demographics ==
According to the 2011 Census of India, Sult tehsil had a population of 57,126. Of these, 25,503 were males and 31,623 were females. There were 12,778 households in the tehsil.

The literacy rate and other demographic characteristics varied among the villages of the tehsil. The census recorded 37,006 literates in Sult tehsil.

== Administration ==
Sult is one of the administrative tehsils of Almora district. It falls under the Bhikiyasain subdivision of the district administration. The tehsil administration is headed by a Sub-Divisional Magistrate (SDM).The headquarters of the tehsil is at Sult.

== Jagdai Koli girl of Sult ==
The Jagdai Kolin was a Koli girl of Sandna Village of Sult Block who married into a family from Sult. She is remembered by locals by the title of the Guardian of Garhwal because of her courageous acts against the Gurkha Army of the Nepal Kingdom. In 1804, the Rana Bahadur Shah of Nepal sent his army to annex the Garhwal and Kumaon in the Nepal Kingdom. But when Gurkha Army arrived in Sult, Jagdai Kolin opposed the army. She saved the lives of thousands of Garhwali people by alerting them with the cry, "The Gurkha Army Has Arrived! The Gurkha Army Has Arrived!". The Gorkha Army captured Jagdai Kolin and injured her. As Jagdai Kolin did not stop, the Gurkha soldiers cut off her breasts, nose, and ears. They trapped Jagdai Kolin in a cottage and burned it down.

== Villages ==
Villages in the Sult subdistrict:

- Achhron Malla
- Achhron Talla
- Ajoli Malli
- Ajoli Talli
- Amdali
- Amdhar
- Ansutale
- Aolet
- Arari Bist
- Babuli
- Bagadiya Sain
- Bajar Khora
- Baman Gaon
- Bamora
- Ban Kota
- Bandharan Basnal
- Bandharan Bist
- Banghat
- Bangidhar
- Barasi
- Baret
- Barhaliya
- Baurh Talla
- Beb
- Bhaisya Gangashri
- Bhakra Kote
- Bhawali Malli
- Bhawali Talli
- Bhel Gaon
- Bhinne
- Bhitakote
- Bhondada
- Bhyari
- Biralgaon Malla
- Biralgaon Talla
- Bisarakhet
- Bora Gaon
- Bour Malla
- Burakota
- Buraspani
- Chakkar goan
- Chami
- Chamkana Adha
- Chamkana Dadharya
- Chamkana Manral
- Chamori
- Chanch
- Chari Kyari
- Charwan
- Chhater Munil
- Chhoya
- Chichoan
- Chounoli
- Churi Jakhani
- Dabhara Saural
- Dadhariya
- Dangkara Koti
- Dangula
- Darmi
- Darmoli
- Debayal
- Debikhal
- Dhach Kote
- Dhai Ki char
- Dhairagaon
- Dhanas
- Dharkot
- Dhopari
- Dudhauri Birkhal
- Dunga Mohan
- Dungara
- Dungari
- Dungaria Sera
- Dyona
- Dyurari
- Ekoraula
- Gajar
- Garhakhet
- Geluwa Danda
- Gethiya
- Gewaipani
- Ghanyal
- Gharkheton
- Ghate Section
- Ghati Gotigate
- Ghuruwa Dhunga
- Ghweri
- Gingrai
- Goghyanibasiseem
- Gudlekh
- Gular
- Gumati
- Haneri
- Hansali
- Harara Tariyal
- Hararhamaulekhi
- Jakh
- Jakhal
- Jalikhan
- Jalikhan
- Jamani
- Jamoli
- Jamriya
- Jashkote
- Jaspur Patawal
- Jaspur Simal
- Jaspur Talla
- Jaspurkote
- Jaspursidh
- Jhargaon
- Jhimar
- Jhipa
- Jihara
- Jogyura
- Jorasi Range
- Junia Gadhi
- Kafalgaon
- Kafalta Talla
- Kaligaon
- Kaligarh
- Kaljhipa Rajwar
- Kalsir
- Kanari Thor
- Kande Khalpati
- Kaphalta Malla
- Karget
- Katriya Malla
- Katriya Talla
- Kaula Chountara
- Kaulapani
- Khaderagaon
- Khatalgaon
- Khatoli
- Khoulyo Kyari
- Khumarh
- Koilekh
- Kopi
- Kota
- Kotali Malli
- Kotali Talli
- Kothal Gaon
- Kuloli
- Kusiyachaun Malla
- Kusiyachaun Talla
- Lakharkote
- Lohargaon
- Luherha
- Machhor
- Machhora Section
- Maina Kote
- Maithani
- Malla Garhkote
- Malli Mahroli
- Mandal Range
- Mangaru Khal
- Mangron sirau
- Manhaite
- Manral Tanaula
- Masaniyabanj
- Masmoli
- Matakhani
- Matwash
- Maulekh
- Mavalgaon
- Mayal Bakhal
- Mayal Gaon
- Medari
- Mijholi
- Mijhora
- Mohan Range
- Morgarh
- Munra
- Nadoli
- Nagachula
- Nagtale
- Naharo
- Naikana
- Nail
- Naugaon
- Newal Gaon
- Newal Gaon
- Okhaliya
- Paisiya
- Pali Ghanyal
- Palligaon
- Panua Devakhan
- Patiya Chaura
- Patodi
- Pina Kot
- Pipana
- Pokhari Malli
- Pokhari Talli
- Ragar Garh
- Rampur
- Ramsingh Kichar
- Rankuna
- Ranthaml
- Ratan Kote
- Rikawasi
- Ritha
- Riwali Palli
- Riwali Walli
- Rudholi
- Sakarkhola
- Saknari
- Sankar
- Sarai Khet
- Sarsoan
- Sarurh Patsari
- Shailain
- Shokhati
- Simgoan
- Singro
- Sirali
- Siroli Kukrar
- Sirswarhi
- Soli
- Talla Garhkote
- Taraari
- Taram
- Tari
- Taya
- Teet
- Thala Manral
- Thala Tariyal
- Thalmarh
- Thatwarar
- Tolyo
- Totam
- Tukanauli
- Tukura
- Uniyalgaon
- Waila

== See also ==
- Almora district
- Bhikiyasain
- Masi, Uttarakhand
- Marchula
