= Niraula =

Niraula निरौला
- Language: Nepali

Origin
- Language: Nepali
- Origin: Nepal

Other names
- Derivatives: Niraula Bahun, Niraula Chhetri
- See also: Poudel, Bhattarai, Adhikari, Subedi, Sapkota

Niraula (Nepali: निरौला, also spelled as "Niroula") is a Nepali surname. "Niraula" is a surname of both Brahmin's and Kshetri's in Nepal and some parts of India. People with the Surname "Niraula" are living in majority of Districts in Nepal including Jhapa, Morang, Kathmandu and others. In India, they live in Places such as Upper Sikkim and Darjeeling. Nirauli is a village in Doti District of Nepal and the surname "Niraula" is believed to be a Toponymic surname derived from this village.

== Notable people ==
° Deepa Shree Niraula (born 1975), Nepali actress ° Pabitra Niraula Kharel, Nepali politician ° Laxmi Prasad Niraula, (Consul General of Nepal to Lhasa, China)°
