= Shiv Singh Oli =

Nepalese politician (born 1987)

- शिव सिंह ओली

Member of the Sudurpashchim Provincial Assembly
- Incumbent
- Assumed office 30 December 2022
- Preceded by: Trilochan Bhatta
- Constituency: Doti 1 (B)

Personal details
- Born: 22 July 1987 (age 39) Jorayal, Doti District, Nepal
- Party: Nepali Communist Party
- Other political affiliations: Nepal Communist Party; Communist Party of Nepal (Maoist Centre)
- Spouse: Elisha Shrestha Oli
- Parents: Kamal Singh Oli (father); Late. Mankala Devi Oli (mother)
- Profession: Politician

Shiv Singh Oli (Nepali: शिव सिंह ओली) is a Nepalese politician and currently serving as a member of the Sudurpashchim Provincial Assembly since 30 December 2022, having won the 2022 Nepalese provincial election from Doti 1 (B) constituency.

== Electoral history ==
=== 2022 provincial elections ===
==== Doti 1 (B) ====
Candidate	Party	Votes	%
Shiv Singh Oli	CPN (Maoist Centre)	14,047	49.28
Tek Bahadur Bam	CPN (Unified Marxist–Leninist)	13,128	46.06
Mohan Bahadur Ban	Rastriya Prajatantra Party	1,327	4.66
Total		28,502	100.00
Majority		919	
CPN (Maoist Centre) hold			
