= Simchaur =

Simchaur सिमचौर
- Village development committee
- Location in Nepal
- Coordinates: 29.00°N 81.01°E
- Country: Nepal
- Zone: Seti Zone
- District: Doti District

Population (1991)
  - Total: 2,591
- Time zone: UTC+5:45 (Nepal Time)

Simchaur is a village development committee in Doti District in the Seti Zone of western Nepal. At the time of the 1991 Nepal census it had a population of 2591 people living in 430 individual households.
