= Satphari =

Satphari सतफारी
- Village development committee
- Location in Nepal
- Coordinates: 29.09°N 81.00°E
- Country: Nepal
- Zone: Seti Zone
- District: Doti District

Population (1991)
  - Total: 2,422
- Time zone: UTC+5:45 (Nepal Time)

Satphari is a village development committee in Doti District in the Seti Zone of western Nepal. At the time of the 1991 Nepal census it had a population of 2422 people living in 401 individual households.
