= K.I. Singh Rural Municipality =

Rural Municipality in Sudurpashchim Province, Nepal

K.I. Singh Rural Municipality केआईसिंह गाउँपालिका
- Rural Municipality
- केआईसिंह गाउँपालिका K.I. Singh Rural Municipality (Nepal)
- Coordinates: 29.171°N 80.965°E
- Country: Nepal
- Province: Sudurpashchim Province
- District: Doti District

Government
  - Type: Local government
  - Chairperson: Lokendra Bahadur Sahi

Area
  - Total: 127.01 km^{2} (49.04 sq mi)

Population (2011 census)
  - Total: 20,903
  - Density: 164.58/km^{2} (426.25/sq mi)
- Time zone: UTC+05:45 (Nepal Standard Time)
- Website: http://kisinghmun.gov.np

K.I. Singh (Nepali: केआईसिंह) is a Gaupalika (Nepali: गाउपालिका, romanized: gaupalika) in Doti District in the Sudurpashchim Province of far-western Nepal. K.I. Singh has a population of 20903.The land area is 127.01 km^{2}.

== Demographics ==
At the time of the 2011 Nepal census, K.I. Singh Rural Municipality had a population of 20,903. Of these, 98.9% spoke Doteli, 0.5% Magar, 0.4% Nepali and 0.2% other languages as their first language.

In terms of ethnicity/caste, 46.2% were Chhetri, 17.2% Kami, 16.7% Hill Brahmin, 6.4% other Dalit, 2.9% Damai/Dholi, 2.3% Sarki, 2.1% Thakuri, 1.5% Lohar, 1.5% Magar, 1.4% Badi, 1.3% Sanyasi/Dasnami, 0.3% other Terai, 0.1% Bengali, 0.1% Newar and 0.1% others.

In terms of religion, 99.9% were Hindu.

In terms of literacy, 52.0% could read and write, 3.9% could only read and 44.0% could neither read nor write.
