= Bhul =

Bhul is a community that resides in the hilly region of Nepal. Bhul is one of the four castes in far-western region of Nepal (Rosyara, Paneru, Chhetri and Bhul being the others).

== Bibliography ==
- Whelpton, John (2005). A History of Nepal. Cambridge University Press. ISBN 978-0521804707.
