= Sanaga =

Sanaga may refer to:

- Sanaga River, a river in Cameroon
- Sanaga-Maritime, an administrative department in Cameroon
- Sanaga, Republic of Buryatia, a town in Buryatia, Russia

== See also ==
- Sanagau
