= Girichauka =

Coordinates: 29°23′N 80°54′E

Girichauka गिरिचौका
- Village development committee
- Interactive map of Girichauka
- Country: Nepal
- Zone: Seti Zone
- District: Doti District

Population (1991)
  - Total: 3,320
- Time zone: UTC+5:45 (Nepal Time)

Girichauka is a village development committee in Doti District in the Seti Zone of western Nepal. At the time of the 1991 Nepal census it had a population of 3320 living in 616 individual households.
