= Toleni =

Toleni टोलेनी
- Village development committee
- Location in Nepal
- Coordinates: 29.39°N 81.00°E
- Country: Nepal
- Zone: Seti Zone
- District: Doti District

Population (2001)
  - Total: 5,604
- Time zone: UTC+5:45 (Nepal Time)

Toleni is a village development committee in Doti District in the Seti Zone of western Nepal. At the time of the 1991 Nepal census it had a population of 4408 people living in 864 individual households.
