= Lakshminagar, Doti =

Lakshminagar लक्ष्मीनगर
- Interactive map of Lakshminagar
- Coordinates: 29.07°N 80.67°E
- Time zone: UTC+5:45

Lakshminagar is a Village Development Committee in Doti District in the Seti Zone of western Nepal. At the time of the 1991 Nepal census it had a population of 3844 residing in 682 individual households.
