= Chhatiwan =

Chhatiwan may refer to:

- Chhatiwan, Narayani
- Chhatiwan, Seti
