= Mannakapadi =

Mannakapadi मन्नाकपाडी
- Village development committee
- Location in Nepal
- Coordinates: 29.08°N 80.87°E
- Country: Nepal
- Zone: Seti Zone
- District: Doti District

Population (1991)
  - Total: 3,184
- Time zone: UTC+5:45 (Nepal Time)

Mannakapadi is a village development committee in Doti District in the Seti Zone of western Nepal. At the time of the 1991 Nepal census it had a population of 3184 living in 527 individual households.
