= Lalbojhi =

Lalbojhi लालबोझी
- Village development committee
- Location in Nepal
- Coordinates: 28.48°N 80.93°E
- Country: Nepal
- Zone: Seti Zone
- District: Kailali District

Population (1991)
  - Total: 6,720
- Time zone: UTC+5:45 (Nepal Time)

Lalbojhi is a village development committee in Kailali District in the Seti Zone of western Nepal. At the time of the 1991 Nepal census it had a population of 6720 living in 1019 individual households.
