= Daud, Nepal =

Daud, Nepal दौड
- Village development committee
- Location in Nepal
- Coordinates: 29.35°N 81.00°E
- Country: Nepal
- Zone: Seti Zone
- District: Doti District

Population (1991)
  - Total: 4,321
- Time zone: UTC+5:45 (Nepal Time)
- Postal code: 10803
- Area code: 094

Daud, Nepal is a village development committee in Doti District in the Seti Zone of western Nepal. At the time of the 1991 Nepal census it had a population of 4321 living in 847 individual households.
