= Masuriya =

Masuriya मसुरिया
- Municipality
- Location in Nepal
- Coordinates: 28.75°N 80.85°E
- Country: Nepal
- Zone: Seti Zone
- District: Kailali District

Population (1991)
  - Total: 9,936
- Time zone: UTC+5:45 (Nepal Time)

Masuriya is a village development committee in Kailali District in the Seti Zone of western Nepal. At the time of the 2011 Nepal census it had a population of 22017 living in 3828 individual households.
