= Banja Kakani =

Banja Kakani बन्जा ककनी
- Village development committee
- Location in Nepal
- Coordinates: 29.32°N 80.94°E
- Country: Nepal
- Zone: Seti Zone
- District: Doti District

Population (1991)
  - Total: 3,104
- Time zone: UTC+5:45 (Nepal Time)

Banja Kakani is a village development committee in Doti District in the Seti Zone of western Nepal. At the time of the 1991 Nepal census it had a population of 3104 living in 604 individual households.
