= Ghanteshwar =

Ghanteshwar घण्टेश्वर
- Village development committee
- Location in Nepal
- Coordinates: 29.14°N 80.61°E
- Country: Nepal
- Zone: Seti Zone
- District: Doti District

Population (1991)
  - Total: 1,619
- Time zone: UTC+5:45 (Nepal Time)

Ghanteshwar is a village development committee in Doti District in the Seti Zone of western Nepal. At the time of the 1991 Nepal census it had a population of 1619 living in 293 individual households.
