= Changra =

Changra may refer to:

- Çankırı, a city in Turkey, Çankırı Province
- Çankırı Province, a province of Turkey
- Changra, Nepal
