= 2024 Almora bus accident =

Indian transport disaster

Almora bus accident
- Location within Uttarakhand Location within India

Details
- Date: 4 November 2024 c. 8:45 a.m. IST
- Location: Marchula; 2 km (1.2 mi) from Almora, Uttarakhand
- Coordinates: 29.6084924°N 79.0909563°E
- Country: India
- Operator: Garhwal Motor Owners Union
- Service: Garhwal to Kumaon
- Incident type: Fall into a 150 m (490 ft) gorge

Statistics
- Passengers: 60
- Crew: 2
- Deaths: 38
- Injured: 25

On 4 November 2024, a bus traveling from Garhwal to the Kumaon region in the Indian state of Uttarakhand fell into a gorge near Almora. 38 people were killed and 25 others were injured.

== Crash ==
At about 6:30 a.m. IST on 4 November 2024, a bus carrying about 60 passengers returning to work after Diwali break and two crew was traveling from Garhwal to Kumaon region in the Indian state of Uttarakhand. At around 8:45 a.m. while traveling on a hill side about 2 km (1.2 mi) from Marchula near Almora, the bus rod spring broke at a bend causing the bus to tilt and fall down 150m into a gorge.

== Emergency response ==
Uttarakhand Police from the Nainital district and three teams of the State Disaster Response Force were dispatched to the site. Rescued passengers were admitted to nearby hospitals and three critically injured passengers were airlifted to AIIMS in Rishikesh for treatment.

== Victims ==
Thirty-six people were killed and 27 others were injured in the crash. Two of those injured died on November 12 after being hospitalized after the crash, bringing the final death toll to 38.

== Cause ==
The bus was purportedly carrying 60 passengers including many standing passengers at the time of the incident, although the bus was built to hold only 42 passengers. Many people were reported to have died on the spot after being thrown out of the bus on impact.

== Reactions ==
The Chief Minister of Uttarakhand Pushkar Singh Dhami announced a compensation of ₹0.4 million (US$4,300) for the families of the deceased and ₹0.1 million (US$1,100) for the injured. Various leaders expressed their condolences on the accident.
