= Kadamandau =

Coordinates: 29°17′N 81°5′E

Kadamandau kadamandu
- Village development committee
- Interactive map of Kadamandau
- Country: Nepal
- Zone: Seti Zone
- District: Doti District

Population (1991)
  - Total: 3,084
- Time zone: UTC+5:45 (Nepal Time)

Kadamandau is a village development committee in Doti District in the Seti Zone of western Nepal. At the time of the 1991 Nepal census it had a population of 3084 living in 609 individual households.

== History ==
In 1946, a flood washed away all of the area's cows.
