= Barchhen =

Coordinates: 29°0′N 80°47′E

Barchhain बर्छैन
- Village development committee
- Interactive map of Barchhain
- Country: Nepal
- Zone: Seti Zone
- District: Doti District

Population (1991)
  - Total: 4,343
- Time zone: UTC+5:45 (Nepal Time)

Barchhain is a village development committee in Doti District, in the Seti Zone of western Nepal. It is located in the region of Sudurpashchim Pradesh, and the distance from Barchhain to the capital of Nepal, Kathmandu (Kathmandu), is approximately 463.5 km (288.0 mi). At the time of the 1991 Nepal census, it had a population of 4,343 living in 675 individual households.
