= Dhirkamandau =

Dhirkamandau धिर्कामाडौं
- Village development committee
- Location in Nepal
- Coordinates: 29.11°N 80.94°E
- Country: Nepal
- Zone: Seti Zone
- District: Doti District

Population (1991)
  - Total: 1,754
- Time zone: UTC+5:45 (Nepal Time)

Dhirkamandau is a village development committee in Doti District in the Seti Zone of western Nepal. At the time of the 1991 Nepal census, it had a population of 1754 living in 355 individual households.
