= Gaguda =

Gaguda गागुडा
- Village development committee
- Location in Nepal
- Coordinates: 29.13°N 81.05°E
- Country: Nepal
- Zone: Seti Zone
- District: Doti District

Population (1991)
  - Total: 2,470
- Time zone: UTC+5:45 (Nepal Time)

Gaguda is a village development committee in Doti District in the Seti Zone of western Nepal. At the time of the 1991 Nepal census it had a population of 2470 living in 478 individual households.
