= Tikhatar =

Tikhatar तिखाटार
- Village development committee
- Location in Nepal
- Coordinates: 29.16°N 81.01°E
- Country: Nepal
- Zone: Seti Zone
- District: Doti District

Population (1991)
  - Total: 5,222
- Time zone: UTC+5:45 (Nepal Time)

Tikhatar is a village development committee in Doti District in the Seti Zone of western Nepal. At the time of the 1991 Nepal census it had a population of 5222 people in 958 individual households.

== History ==
This village development committee has a long history. 1814 AD, The war between Gorkha and Kingdom of Doti was fought at bank of the seti river. Malla of Budhakot, Bogtan and Shahi of Dumrakot (this VDC) fought war against Nepali Gorkha's expansion. There is a front (battle field) called Naari-Dang and reinforcement camp at Kuthakot (most probably this place is also in this VDC. This village is the birthplace of many national level politicians and bureaucrats. The great revolutionary leader; ex-Prime Minister Dr. K. I. Singh was born in this village. At the time of his premiership in 1956, he established the "Indra Primary School" with a donation of five thousand rupees. This is the oldest school in this area. The school is now known as “Indra Higher Secondary school” situated at Lek-gada Dumrakot.
