= Ladagada =

Ladagada लेडागाडा
- Village development committee
- Location in Nepal
- Coordinates: 29.26°N 81.03°E
- Country: Nepal
- Zone: Seti Zone
- District: Doti District

Population (1991)
  - Total: 3,081
- Time zone: UTC+5:45 (Nepal Time)

Ladagada is a village development committee in Doti District in the Seti Zone of western Nepal. At the time of the 1991 Nepal census it had a population of 3081 living in 626 individual households.

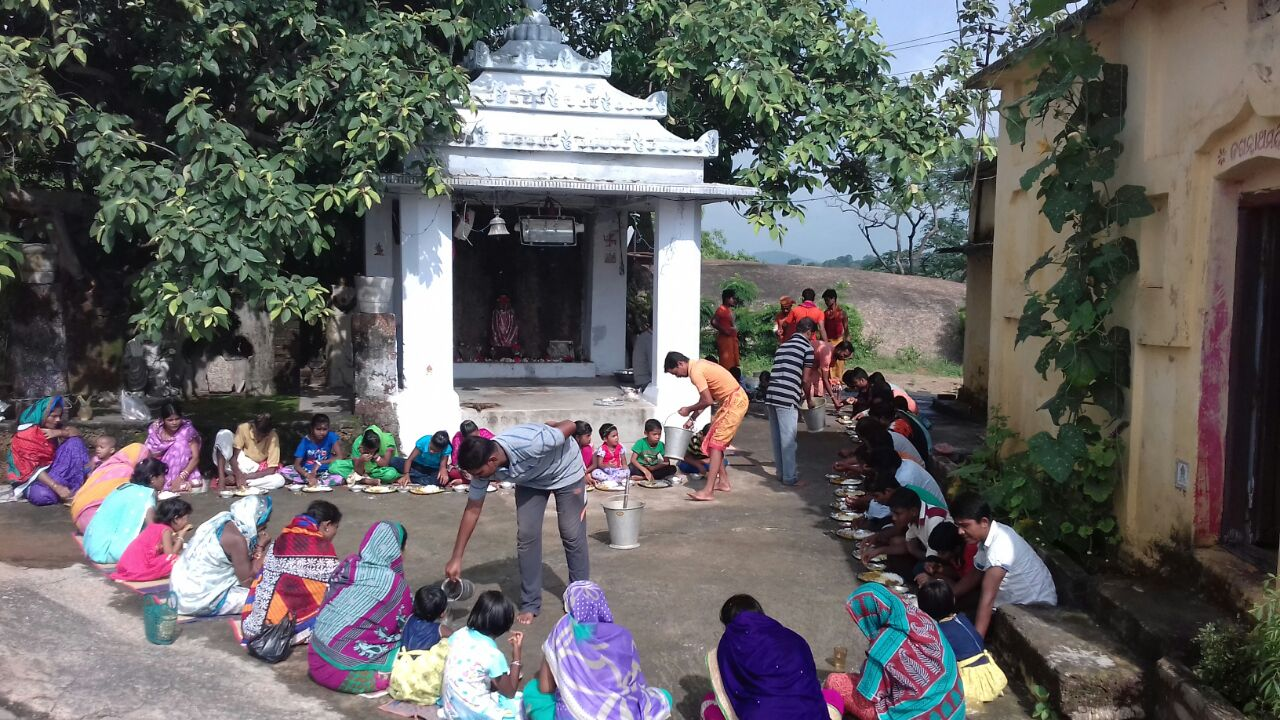
Ladagada temple.
