= Khailad =

Khailad खैलार
- Village development committee
- Location in Nepal
- Coordinates: 28.55°N 80.94°E
- Country: Nepal
- Zone: Seti Zone
- District: Kailali District

Population (1991)
  - Total: 5,734
- Time zone: UTC+5:45 (Nepal Time)

Khailad is a village development committee in Kailali District But now it is combine with Bhajani Municipality in the Seti Zone of western Nepal. At the time of the 1991 Nepal census it had a population of 5734 living in 610 individual households.
