= Pokhari =

Pokhari may refer to:

- Pokhari, Sagarmatha, Nepal
- Pokhari, Seti, Nepal
