= Dhanglagaun =

Ghangal gaun घाङल गाउँ
- Village development committee
- Location in Nepal
- Coordinates: 28.98°N 80.94°E
- Country: Nepal
- Zone: Seti Zone
- District: Doti District

Population (1991)
  - Total: 3,111
- Time zone: UTC+5:45 (Nepal Time)

Ghangal is a village development committee in Doti District in the former Seti Zone (now Sudurpashchim Province) of western Nepal. At the time of the 1991 Nepal census it had a population of 3,111 living in 486 individual households.
