= Kalikasthan =

Kalikasthan may refer to:

- Kalikasthan, Achham
- Kalikasthan, Doti
