= Chhapali =

Chhapali छपली
- Village development committee
- Location in Nepal
- Coordinates: 29.40°N 80.92°E
- Country: Nepal
- Zone: Seti Zone
- District: Doti District

Population (1991)
  - Total: 2,509
- Time zone: UTC+5:45 (Nepal Time)

Chhapali is a village development committee in Doti District in the Seti Zone of western Nepal. At the time of the 1991 Nepal census, it had a population of 2,509 living in 501 individual households.
