= Gadasera =

Gadasera गडासेरा
- Village development committee
- Location in Nepal
- Coordinates: 29.12°N 80.79°E
- Country: Nepal
- Zone: Seti Zone
- District: Doti District

Population (1991)
  - Total: 3,475
- Time zone: UTC+5:45 (Nepal Time)

Gadasera is a village in Jorayal Gaun Palika (Jorayal Rural Municipality) in Doti District in the Seti Zone of western Nepal. It was an independent Village Development Committee before the new Constitution of Nepal was promulgated in 2015. At the time of the 1991 Nepal census it had a population of 3475 living in 648 individual households.
