= Mahadevsthan =

Mahadevsthan may refer to several places in Nepal.

- Mahadevsthan, Dhading
- Mahadevsthan, Kathmandu
- Mahadevsthan, Sindhuli
- Mahadevsthan, Baitadi
- Mahadevsthan, Doti
