= Udasipur =

Udasipur उदासीपुर
- Village development committee
- Location in Nepal
- Coordinates: 28.67°N 80.83°E
- Country: Nepal
- Zone: Seti Zone
- District: Kailali District

Population (1991)
  - Total: 5,320
- Time zone: UTC+5:45 (Nepal Time)

Udasipur is a village development committee in Kailali District in the Seti Zone of western Nepal. At the time of the 1991 Nepal census it had a population of 5320 living in 579 individual households.
