= Bogatan-Phudsil Rural Municipality =

Bogatan-Phudsil Rural Municipality वोगटान–फुड्सिल गाउँपालिका
- Rural Municipality
- वोगटान–फुड्सिल गाउँपालिका Bogatan-Phudsil Rural Municipality (Nepal)
- Coordinates: 29.0550°N 81.0398°E
- Country: Nepal
- Province: Sudurpashchim Province
- District: Doti District

Government
  - Type: Local government
  - Chairperson: Kamal Bahadur Gadsila
  - Administrative Head: Shankar Suchikar

Area
  - Total: 300.22 km^{2} (115.92 sq mi)

Population (2011 census)
  - Total: 17,902
  - Density: 59.630/km^{2} (154.44/sq mi)
- Time zone: UTC+05:45 (Nepal Standard Time)
- Website: http://bogatanmun.gov.np

Bogatan-Phudsil (Nepali: वोगटान–फुड्सिल) is a Gaupalika in Doti District in the Sudurpashchim Province of far-western Nepal. Bogatan-Phudsil has a population of 17902.The land area is 300.22 km^{2}. It was formed by merging Simchaur, Kedar Akhada, Kanachaur, Satfari, Dhirkamandau, Gakuda and Chawarachautra VDCs.

== Demographics ==
At the time of the 2011 Nepal census, Bogatan-Phudsil Rural Municipality had a population of 17,906. Of these, 94.5% spoke Doteli, 2.1% Kham, 1.6% Magar, 1.4% Nepali, 0.2% Achhami, 0.1% Maithili and 0.1% other languages as their first language.

In terms of ethnicity/caste, 60.3% were Chhetri, 14.7% Kami, 7.9% Thakuri, 4.6% Hill Brahmin, 4.4% Damai/Dholi, 4.0% Magar, 1.4% Badi, 1.3% Sarki, 0.6% other Dalit, 0.3% Sanyasi/Dasnami, 0.1% Gharti/Bhujel, 0.1% Lohar, 0.1% other Terai and 0.2% others.

In terms of religion, 98.2% were Hindu and 1.8% Buddhist.

In terms of literacy, 55.2% could read and write, 3.7% could only read and 41.1% could neither read nor write.
