= Bhumirajmandau =

Coordinates: 29°10′N 80°55′E

Bhumirajmandau भूमिराजमाडौं
- Village development committee
- Interactive map of Bhumirajmandau
- Country: Nepal
- Zone: Seti Zone
- District: Doti District

Population (1991)
  - Total: 3,891
- Time zone: UTC+5:45 (Nepal Time)

Bhumirajmandau is a village development committee in Doti District in the Seti Zone of western Nepal. At the time of the 1991 Nepal census it had a population of 3891 living in 743 individual households.
