= Khairala =

Khairala खैरला
- Village development committee
- Location in Nepal
- Coordinates: 28.87°N 80.76°E
- Country: Nepal
- Zone: Seti Zone
- District: Kailali District

Population (1991)
  - Total: 3,382
- Time zone: UTC+5:45 (Nepal Time)

Khairala is a village development committee in Kailali District in the Seti Zone of western Nepal. At the time of the 1991 Nepal census it had a population of 3382 living in 541 individual households.
