= Kota Tulsipur =

Kotatulsipur कोटातुल्सीपुर
- Village development committee
- Location in Nepal
- Coordinates: 28.65°N 81.02°E
- Country: Nepal
- Zone: Seti Zone
- District: Kailali District

Population (1991)
  - Total: 6,210
- Time zone: UTC+5:45 (Nepal Time)

Kota Tulsipur is a village development committee in Kailali District in the Seti Zone of western Nepal. At the time of the 1991 Nepal census it had a population of 6210 living in 839 individual households.
