= Kapalleki =

Kapallekee कपल्लेकी
- Village Development Committee
- Location in Nepal
- Coordinates: 29.17°N 80.88°E
- Country: Nepal
- Zone: Seti Zone
- District: Doti District

Population (2011)
  - Total: 3,845
- Time zone: UTC+5:45 (Nepal Time)

Kapalleki is a village development committee in Doti District in the Seti Zone of western Nepal. At the time of the 2011 Nepal census it had a population of 4049.
