= Changra, Nepal =

Changra चाङ्गरा
- Village development committee
- Country: Nepal
- Zone: Seti Zone
- District: Doti District

Population (1991)
  - Total: 2,748
- Time zone: UTC+5:45 (Nepal Time)

Changra is a village development committee in Doti District in the Seti Zone of western Nepal. At the time of the 1991 Nepal census it had a population of 2748 living in 532 individual households.
