= Pabitra Niraula Kharel =

Nepalese politician and Member of Parliament

Pabitra Niraula (Kharel)
- पवित्रा निरौला (खरेल)

Chairperson of the International Relations Committee, Pratinidhi Sabha
- In office 21 September 2018 – 18 September 2022

Member of Parliament, Pratinidhi Sabha
- In office 4 March 2018 – 18 September 2022
- Preceded by: Sudhir Kumar Siwakoti
- Constituency: Jhapa 2

Personal details
- Born: Pabitra Niraula; 3 February 1964 (age 62) Damak, Jhapa District
- Party: CPN (UML)

Pabitra Niraula (Kharel) (Nepali: पवित्रा निरैला खरेल) (born Pabitra Niraula; 3 February 1964) is a Nepali politician and one of only six women MPs to be elected, under the first-past-the-post (FPTP) system in the 2017 elections, to the House of representatives of the federal parliament. She is the chair of the Parliamentary International Relations Committee. She is also a member of the National Representation Council and a long time central member of the All Nepal Women Association.

She had joined politics as a freedom fighter while still a student, and was held political prisoner by the state for a time.

== Early life ==
She was born on 3 February 1964 in Damak, Jhapa to Khadga Maya Niraula and her husband Chhabi Lal. She has an education up to Intermediate level. She entered active politics in 1978 while still a student, as a member of the student wing of the Nepali communist movement that was fighting against the "party-less" Panchayat system in the country.

== Political career ==
As a member of the All Nepal National Free Students Union (ANNFSU), she was arrested while still a student, and could not continue her studies past the Intermediate level, having been held a political prisoner by the Panchayat government. At the first national convention of All Nepal Women Association, she was elected as the central member. She has also held the post of the secretary of Jhapa District Working Committee of Communist Party of Nepal (Unified Marxist–Leninist)(CPN UML) and a nominated member of Jhapa District Development Committee. She is a member of the National Representation Council. She remains the central member of All Nepal Women Association, the women wing of Nepal Communist Party (NCP).

In the 2017 legislative elections, she was fielded by CPN UML, now NCP, from the Jhapa-2 constituency and garnered 45,817 votes, defeating her closest rival, Uddhav Thapa of Nepali Congress by more than 13,500 votes. Following her election, she was also elected to chair the Parliamentary International Relations Committee. According to the understanding that half of all federal parliamentary committees should be led by female parliamentarians, she was elected unopposed to the post. According to Setopati, She was one of the parliamentary committee chairs who demanded and received new vehicles from the government in June 2019. She had reportedly complained that her vehicle kept breaking down while on long road trips.

== Personal life ==
She has two daughters.

== See also ==
- Ram Kumari Jhakri
- Komal Oli
