= Rosyara =

'"Rosyara"' (Nepali: रोस्यारा ) or Roshyara (Nepali:रोश्यारा) is a western Nepalese Brahmin surname. Rosyara is rare because it is derived from other common surnames, with only approximately 10000 people who bear it. The Gotra of Roshyara is Garga and Atri. Roshyara from Tallo Chhoya and other part of Doti and Navadurga Koteli, Dadeldhura are spelled as "Roshyara" (nepali रोश्यारा ).

Rosyara ancestors were royal priests to the kings of Doti, a region in Nepal.

== Derivation ==
Rosyara was derived from the word "Roshyo," meaning "Kitchen" in Doteli language.

Rosyara served food at rituals and feasts. A cultural belief holds that higher castes must not take food from lower castes. This shows the Rosyara were little trusted or respected by the royal family of Doti.

Rosyara ancestors were royal priests of the King of Doti. Their descendant blood lines are still respected in Nepal.

== History ==
The Rosyara family lived in a village called Chhoya (in Nepali: छोया) in the 14th century. Their prior history is unknown. Some people believed that the royal family of Doti Kingdom is connected with Ayoddhya and the sun. That may be the reason they write "Suryabanshi Raja".

The Rosyara family were not the only royal priests, but it seems that they were closest to the royal family. Historically, they were royal priests of the powerful Doti Kingdom. The Bhatu Rosyara was an ancestor who had a big house, a horse and a large number of "Jajman" (religious clients). The Chhoya was a gift of King of Doti. The inscription in stone says: Chaitra Badi 7, 1887 (44/221-22).

Royal order to Naran Rosyara:

Formerly, the village of Chhoyagaun in the Dankot garkha of Doti has been granted to your ancestors by the King of Doti through a copper plate inscription. The lands were subdivided in your family, and the prescribed rota tax was duly paid. Subsequently, Jyami Rosyara and Hiruwa Rosyara died without leaving any heirs behind, and a dispute arose among the other brothers about their share of the lands. It was eventually decided that you should cultivate the lands by rotation. In the year 1882 Vikrama, the lands were registered in the course of a revenue settlement in the name of Naran Rosyara. We hereby issue this order under the royal seal reconfirming the lands in your name. Pay the prescribed taxes through the appropriate jimmawal and mukhiya and use the lands as your property (bepoti).

Jotisi - Astrology and cultural advisory is Rosyara Family Tradition

Doti district was historically a separate country ruled by the Shah family. Rosyara are pandits of the Shah family. This Shah family is different from the current King of Nepal. Doti, independent after 1376. Their domain extended from Kali Kumaon in the west to Karnali in the east, Thakurji in the north and in the south. In 1797 V.S. Mandhata Shah reestablished Doti as an independent state and became its ruler. Deep Shahi ruled Doti when Nepalese troops attacked. His copper plate says up to 1780 AD (Baishakh, 5,1847 VS), which proved that he was not conquered until that date. Amar Singh Thapa defeated the King of Doti in two battles at Dumrakot and Narimghat. Thus Bhadur shah was victorious over the Doteli king, although the Kingdom remained in some ways an administrative unit of the district as a minor ruler (Rajaouta). This shows that Rosyara were already in the place at this time.

== Ancestral occupation and cultural traditions ==
Rosyara ancestors were royal priests ("Pandit" in Nepali). The most famous priests were the priests Tika Dutta and Jaya Raj. The Kuldebata (family goddesses) of the family are Panere and Banthadi. They still pray to these goddess each year. In addition, they pray for Pitarni Jeu (ancestor god) every year. Pitarni Jeu was supposed to protect them from evil in past from Golkoti Balayar rajouta. Pitarni jeu was said to defend against the bad prayers of Golkoti Balayar. Later the Golmakoti balayar had no descendant.

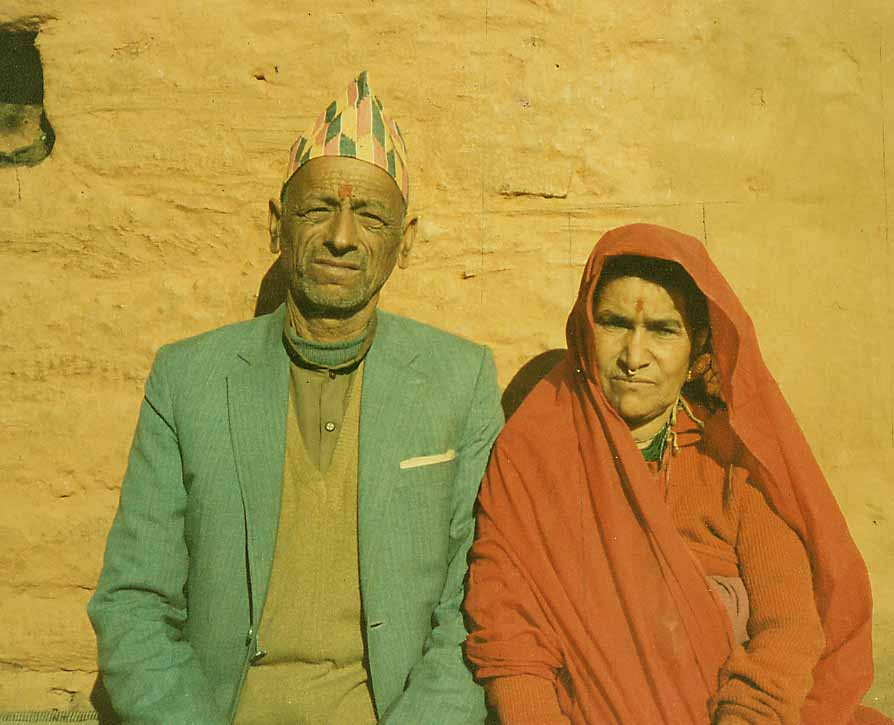
Pandit Jaya Raj Rosyara and Kamala Rosyara

== Ancestors and Pedigree ==
The following are names of ancestors based on order (first born)

- Arjun Rosyara (Born around 1709 V.S.)
- Nana Rosyara
- Lachhiman Rosyara
- Narayan Rosyara
- Shiv Dutt Rosyara
- Gopal Rosyara - Hari Krishna Rosyara - Kam Dev Rosyara
- Tika Dutta Rosyara (1941-2026 B. S.) - Dev Dutta Rosyara
- Jaya Raj Rosyara - Nil Kantha - Khagendra- Lok Raj - Umakanta

The following are names of ancestors based on people of chhoya doti (tallo Chhoya). Purshotam Roshyara Jay Krishna Roshyara and Padam Nath Roshyara Shiva Raj Roshyara and Mahadev Roshyara Tika Datta Roshyara and Hem Raj Roshyara.

Beyond Chhoya, the Roshyara surname is embraced by multiple individuals in the Navadurga Koteli of Dadeldhura. They all share a common Garga Gotra. To illustrate, consider the family names:

Dhrama Dev Roshyara Radha Devi Roshyara Meen Raj Roshyara Parwati Devi Roshyara Tara Prasad Roshyara Bharat Roshyara Jyoti Roshyara

== See also ==
- Chhoya

Navadurga Rural municipality Koteli Dadeldhura
