= Sayal Rural Municipality =

Sayal Rural Municipality सायल गाउँपालिका
- Rural Municipality
- सायल गाउँपालिका Sayal Rural Municipality (Nepal)
- Coordinates: 29.3739°N 80.9748°E
- Country: Nepal
- Province: Sudurpashchim Province
- District: Doti District

Government
  - Type: Local government
  - Chairperson: Dharma Raj Joshi
  - Administrative Head: Hark Bahadur Saphari

Area
  - Total: 122.72 km^{2} (47.38 sq mi)

Population (2011 census)
  - Total: 19,551
  - Density: 159.31/km^{2} (412.62/sq mi)
- Time zone: UTC+05:45 (Nepal Standard Time)
- Website: http://sayalmun.gov.np

Sayal (Nepali: सायल) is a Gaupalika in Doti District in the Sudurpashchim Province of far-western Nepal. Sayal has a population of 19551.The land area is 122.72 km^{2}. It was formed by merging Chapali, Toleni and Khatiwada VDCs.

== Demographics ==
At the time of the 2011 Nepal census, Sayal Rural Municipality had a population of 19,575. of these, 99.2% spoke Doteli, 0.4% Bajhangi, 0.3% Nepali and 0.2% other languages as their first language.

In terms of ethnicity/caste, 62.7% were Chhetri, 11.5% Kami, 8.3% Damai/Dholi, 7.4% Thakuri, 3.4% Hill Brahmin, 2.7% Sarki, 1.2% Kumal, 0.9% Badi, 0.8% Lohar, 0.4% Sanyasi/Dasnami, 0.3% other Dalit, 0.1% Yadav and 0.2% others.

In terms of religion, 100.0% were Hindu.

In terms of literacy, 44.1% could read and write, 5.2% could only read and 50.7% could neither read nor write.
