= Jijodamandau =

Jijodamandau जिजोडामाडौं
- Village development committee
- Location in Nepal
- Coordinates: 29.25°N 80.75°E
- Country: Nepal
- Zone: Seti Zone
- District: Doti District

Population (1991)
  - Total: 1,906
- Time zone: UTC+5:45 (Nepal Time)

Jijodamandau is a village development committee in Doti District in the Seti Zone of western Nepal. At the time of the 1991 Nepal census it had a population of 1906 living in 365 individual households.

The villages that falls on this VDC include Jijoda, Chhoya, Uchhakot, Dhunga, Sunda, Jainoli, Chamagaun and Suwagarah. The higher secondary school of this VDC is Shri Sita Ram Higher Secondary, Uchhakot, Doti. The school rank among top five higher secondary school in doti district. The VDC is also known for good climate and greenery. Beautiful Saiyapal himalaya and seti river can also be viewed from this VDC.

See also: chhoya
