= Chhatiwan, Doti =

Coordinates: 29°4′N 80°37′E

Chhatiwan छतिवन
- Village Development Committee
- Interactive map of Chhatiwan
- Country: Nepal
- Zone: Seti Zone
- District: Doti District

Population (1991)
  - Total: 3,000
- Time zone: UTC+5:45 (Nepal Time)

Chhatiwan is a Village Development Committee in Doti District in the Seti Zone of western Nepal. At the time of the 1991 Nepal census it had a population of 3000 residing in 478 individual households. The name for this VDC comes from a lake that is situated in the village of Chhatiwan. This lake has fresh drinking water and teemed with various kind of fish. Lately due to the deforestation and soil erosion, this lake is being filled with all debris coming in due to the flash flood from its North side of the mountain. Budar is the major town of this VDC and at this town Dadeldhura and Jogbuda roads cross. Some of the major villages in this VDC are Budar, Ritha, Phaltude, Dharapani, Chhatiwan, Chhahara and many others. There are two small mountain streams that eventually meet up at Deujaal. A stream that comes from the Chhahara village has a wonderful water fall. The name of the water fall itself is Chhahara. In Nepali "Chhahara" means water fall. Once in a year there is a special festival at the foot of this water fall where people from many surrounding villages come and celebrate throughout the night. The festival begins in the evening and people sing, dance and merry all through the night. This is also the night when lovers elope if the family does not agree for their marriage. Along the stream grows a plant called "sisnu". This plant has mild poisonous element and once the Caterpillar type of hairy things get stuck in the skin, the skin will be burning for a long time. But the belief is that once in a year after the festival you have to be stung by that plant so that you will remain healthy throughout that year. So, people will be chasing each other in the morning to torture each other with that plant. Some times drinking creates big fights among the villager.
Chhatiwan VDC is also popular for a model school in far west Nepal. Rampur School is the oldest school and now it has school for the disabled children for the whole of Far west. There is also an Army School in Budar. During the construction of Dadeldhura Highway, Budar was very important place as it was the headquarters for the road construction department.
