= Badikedar Rural Municipality =

Badikedar Rural Municipality बड्डी केदार गाउँपालिका
- Rural Municipality
- बड्डी केदार गाउँपालिका Badikedar Rural Municipality (Nepal)
- Coordinates: 29.0216°N 80.882°E
- Country: Nepal
- Province: Sudurpashchim Province
- District: Doti District

Government
  - Type: Local government
  - Chairperson: Krishna Bahadur Chand
  - Administrative Head: Dipak Raj Jaisi

Area
  - Total: 332.55 km^{2} (128.40 sq mi)

Population (2011 census)
  - Total: 16,720
  - Density: 50.28/km^{2} (130.2/sq mi)
- Time zone: UTC+05:45 (Nepal Standard Time)
- Website: http://badikedarmun.gov.np

Badikedar (Nepali: बड्डी केदार) is a Gaupalika (Nepali: गाउपालिका, romanized: gaupalika) in Doti District in the Sudurpashchim Province of far-western Nepal. Badikedar has a population of 16720.The land area is 332.55 km^{2}. It was formed by merging Ghangal, Mannakapadi and Lanakedareshwor VDCs.

== Demographics ==
At the time of the 2011 Nepal census, Badikedar Rural Municipality had a population of 16,731. Of these, 67.2% spoke Doteli, 28.1% Nepali, 3.6% Magar, 0.8% Kham and 0.3% other languages as their first language.

In terms of ethnicity/caste, 46.2% were Chhetri, 18.8% Magar, 9.1% Kami, 8.8% Thakuri, 8.0% Sarki, 4.5% Hill Brahmin, 1.5% Damai/Dholi, 1.0% Badi, 0.9% Tamang, 0.7% Sanyasi/Dasnami, 0.4% Gurung, 0.1% other Dalit and 0.2% others.

In terms of religion, 96.3% were Hindu, 3.6% Buddhist and 0.1% Christian.

In terms of literacy, 62.8% could read and write, 4.3% could only read and 32.8% could neither read nor write.
