= Pokhari, Doti =

Coordinates: 29°13′N 81°5′E

Pokhari पोखरी
- Village Development Committee
- Interactive map of Pokhari
- Country: Nepal
- Zone: Seti Zone
- District: Doti District

Population (1991)
  - Total: 2,968
- Time zone: UTC+5:45 (Nepal Time)

Pokhari is a Village Development Committee in Doti District in the Seti Zone of western Nepal. At the time of the 1991 Nepal census it had a population of 2968 residing in 632 individual households.
