= Mudabhara =

Mudabhara मुडाभरा
- Village development committee
- Location in Nepal
- Coordinates: 29.21°N 80.85°E
- Country: Nepal
- Zone: Seti Zone
- District: Doti District

Population (1991)
  - Total: 4,263
- Time zone: UTC+5:45 (Nepal Time)

Mudabhara is a village development committee in Doti District in the Seti Zone of western Nepal. At the time of the 1991 Nepal census it had a population of 4263 living in 840 individual households.
