= Banalek =

Banalek बनालेक
- Village development committee
- Interactive map of Banalek
- Coordinates: 29.2833°N 80.7667°E
- Country: Nepal
- Zone: Seti Zone
- District: Doti District

Population (1991)
  - Total: 3,812
- Time zone: UTC+5:45 (Nepal Time)

Banalek is a village development committee in Doti District in the Seti Zone of western Nepal. At the time of the 1991 Nepal census it had a population of 3,812 living in 608 individual households.
