= Chhoya =

Village in Nepal

Chhoya छोया is a village placed at approximately 55 km southwest of Dipayal, Doti, Nepal. The altitude of the village is 1294 m (4246 feet) above the mean sea level and geographic locators - 29°15′58″N and 80°46′52″E. The village is located in Jijodamandau VDC of Doti District of Nepal. This is 2 ward of the village development committee. The population of this village is about of 400 individuals residing in 50 individual households. The chhoya is divided into two Mallo and Tallo Chhoya.

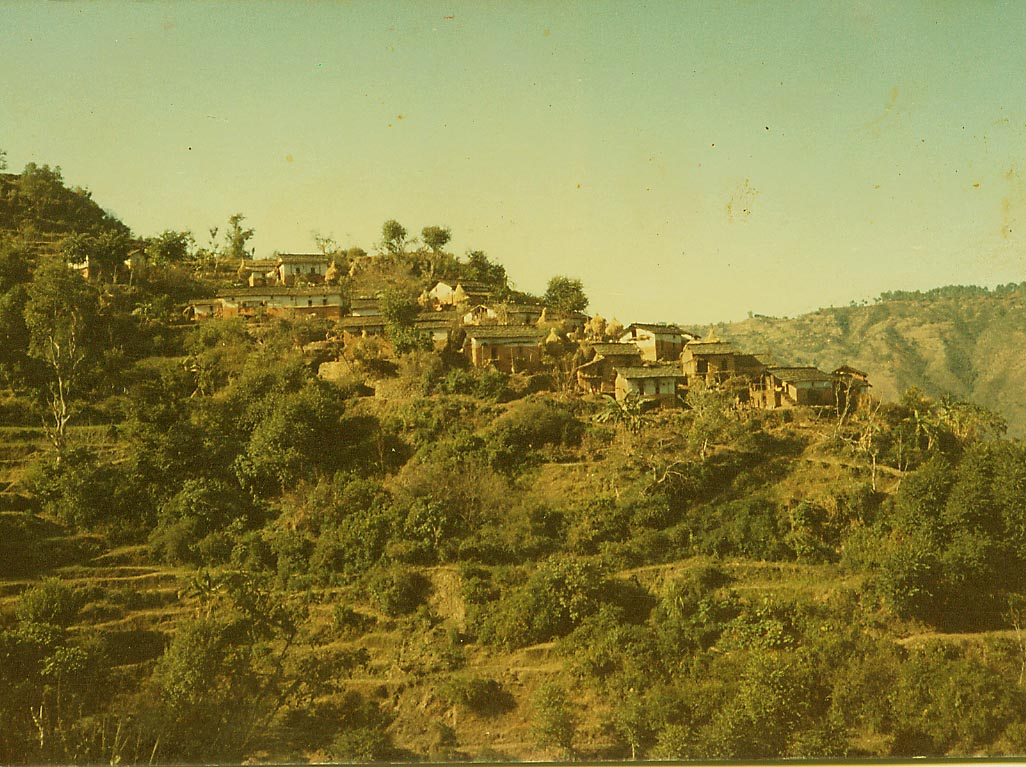
Mallo chhoya village.

The village are resided by four casts - Rosyara, Paneru, Bhul, and Damai. The village has beautiful panoramic view of typical mountains and Saipal Himalayan range can be viewed. Also there is also a small beautiful river (Ghatai garh) and newly establishing community forest. A five grade primary school for kids and a temple dedicated to Radha Krishana are located there. There is also an ancient forest sacred to the local goddess "Panere". The residents of Chhoya worship their local god every year.

== History ==
Rosyara, Paneru and Bhat have resided in Chhoya prior to the 14th century. Their origins are not known, but they may be from India. Historically Rosyara were royal priests of Doti district. Paneru are people who assist with carry and managing drinking water. The Bhatu Rosyara was one of ancestors who have very big house, horse and large number of "Jajman". Religious clients are known as “Jajman”. The Chhoya was gift of King of Doti (Regmi Research report). The inscribed in stone says that -

Chaitra Badi 7, 1887 (44/221-22)

Royal order to Naran Rosyara: Formerly, the village of Chhoyagaun in the Dankot garkha of Doti had been granted to your ancestors by the King of Doti through a copper plate inscription. The lands were subdivided in your family, and the prescribed pota tax was duly paid. Subsequently, Jyami Rosyara and Hiruwa Rosyara died without leaving any heirs behind, and a dispute arose among the other brothers about their share of the lands. It was eventually decided that you should cultivate the lands by rotation. In the year 1882 Vikrama, the lands were registered in the course of a revenue settlement in the name of Naran Rosyara. We hereby issue this order under the royal seal reconfirming the lands in your name. pay the prescribed taxes through the appropriate jimmawal and mukhiya and use the lands as your property (bepoti).

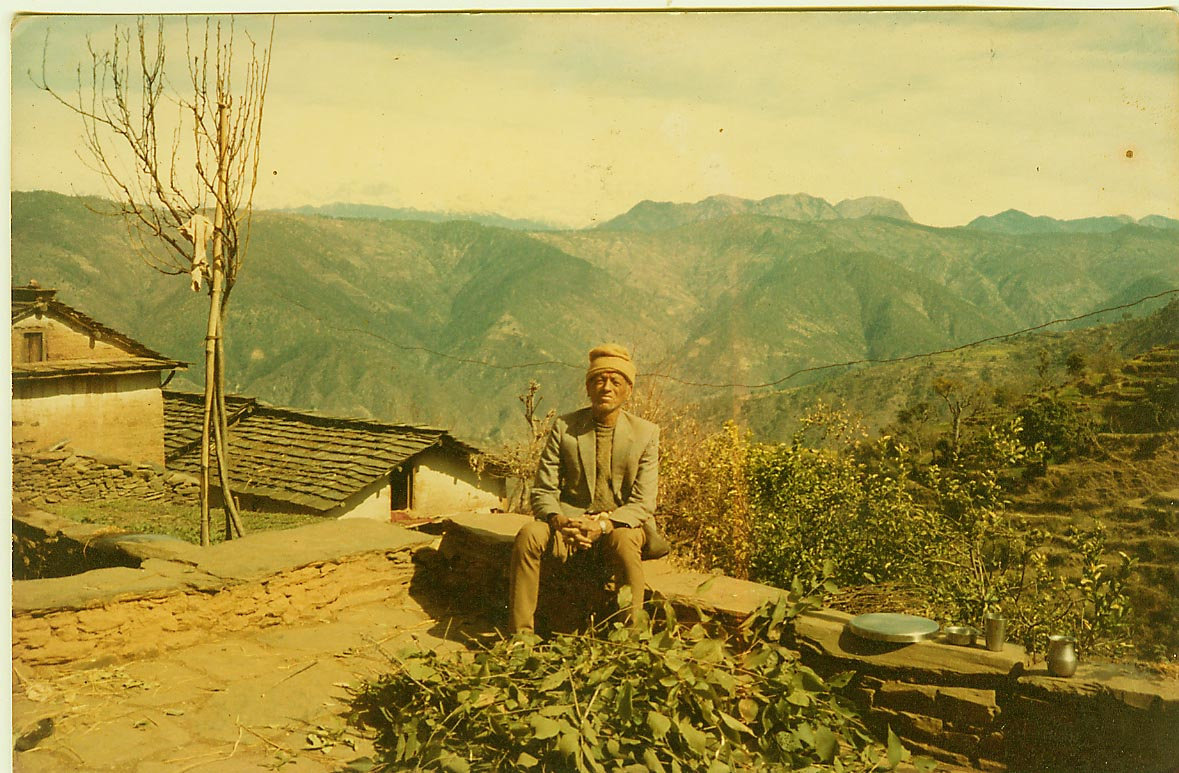
Pan. Jayaraj Rosyara (born 1915 AD) with mountain view from Chhoya in background.

Doti district was historically a separate country ruled by the Shah family. Rosyara are pandits of the Shah family. The Shah family of Doti district is different from the current King of Nepal. Doti was independent after 1376 extended from Kali Kumaon in west to Karnali in the east, Thakurji in the North and the terai in South. In 1797 V.S. Mandhata Shah reestablished Doti as independent state and Shah were ruling. Deep Shahi ruled Doti when the Nepalese troops attacked. His copper plate says that up to 1780 AD (Baishakh, 5,1847 VS) proved that he was not conquered till that date. Amar Singh Thapa succeeded to defeat the King of Doti in two battles at Dumrakot and Narimghat. Thus the Bhadur shah did victory over the Doteli king, still the King remained head of the administrative unit of the district as minor ruler (Rajaouta). This shows that Rosyara were already in the place at this time.

== See also ==
Rosyara
