= Sanagaun =

Sanagaun सानागाउँ
- Village development committee
- Location in Nepal
- Coordinates: 29.26°N 81.07°E
- Country: Nepal
- Zone: Seti Zone
- District: Doti District

Population (1991)
  - Total: 1,871
- Time zone: UTC+5:45 (Nepal Time)
- Postal code: 10802
- Area code: 094

Sanagaun is a village development committee in Doti District in the Seti Zone of western Nepal. At the time of the 1991 Nepal census it had a population of 1871 living in 383 individual households.
