= Uniyalgaon =

- Village
- Country: India
- State: Uttarakhand
- District: Tehri Garhwal

Government
  - Type: Panchayat
  - Body: Uniyal Gaon Panchayat
- Elevation: 372 m (1,220 ft)

Population
  - Total: 64

Languages
  - Official: Hindi
  - Native: Garhwali
- Time zone: UTC+5:30 (IST)
- Postal code: 249145
- Vehicle registration: UK
- Website: uk.gov.in

Uniyalgaon (or Uniyal Gaon) is a village in the Tehri Garhwal district of Uttarakhand state in India. It is a part of Dhanaulti tehsil and is administered by the municipality of Chamba. Uniyalgaon is located on the foothills 4 km from Surkanda Devi temple, 40 km from Dehradun and 26 km from Mussoorie. It is served by schools in Satyon and a hospital in Chamba, 12 km away. The village is accessible by Rishikesh-Tehri Road and the National Highway 94.

== History ==
The exact period of establishment is debatable but it is probable that it was settled in before 10th century AD. Before the construction of major highways and roads, the village was accessible by forest trails through the hills connecting it to towns and cities. Before India's Independence, it was administered under the Kingdom of Garhwal. Development in the area was not visible for several years after India's Independence and farming was the only occupation.

== Fauna and Flora ==
Uniyal Gaon is in the Shivaliks of Garhwal, perched at an altitude which makes it the home of several rare plants and animals. Leopards (or baagh) are common in the area and have played a key role in the lifestyle and folklore of the people. Though attacks on humans are rare and have dwindled considerably, cattle remains an easy source of food for the leopard. People have always relied on the forest for cattle-feed, firewood, freshwater and food and realize its importance as well as the impacts of mining it for natural resources. In 1999, Uniyalgaon was the subject of a case study on villagers' reactions to afforestation and natural resource regeneration. In 1996, it participated in the Doon Valley Watershed Management project to gauge the effectiveness of participatory approaches in sustainable management.

== Society ==
Step farming and cattle herding provided a little but somehow allowed the villagers to sustain themselves. Poverty was high in the area, traditional and western education were realized to be the only way out of such conditions and special importance was placed on it, this enabled the farmers to also serve in and around the village as teachers, temple priests and Ayurvedic doctors. Barter system was prevalent for many years in the post-independence era and services could be traded for tobacco, salt, grain, cattle and pulses. Summer houses or chhyaani are commonly found around the village in areas located at a shaded location and were sometimes owned by two or more families. Most of such houses which are maintained to be kept in use are also rented out to tourists visiting Surkanda Devi. Like most traditional Indian villages, it consists of people from a common caste. Uniyal, which is a Hindu Garhwali Brahmin caste, make up the entire population. Since the castes are further subdivided into gotras, Uniyals identify themselves as having the kashyap gotra. Bhairava is worshipped as the kuldevata or a community-deity, this is a common practice in Hindu villages. The literate people of uniyal goan had actively participated in the freedom movement of India, man like Jai Krishna Uniyal went lahore for getting higher studies and formed a social organisation "SUJAN BHANDHU" to organise the youth of their area and inculcicated the feeling of nationalism among them. The village has pride of many number of Freedom Fighters.

== Current ==
The village consists of 100 households with a population of 600. The literacy rate is 71.4%. Over the past three decades, a majority of residents moved to nearby towns and cities due to lack of facilities whichered better job opportunities and a comfortable lifestyle. This was because of commencement of major industrial projects, a boost in tourism and the formation of the state of Uttarakhand. The sudden drain of population has caused the village to reach the brink of being deserted with many homes falling under neglect and abandonment. The few households that still remain depend on traditional farming methods and natural resources from the forests to get by. Several individuals from the village have made their way into key positions in the Government and private corporations. A temple was constructed with funding by the current inhabitants of the village and the ones who now reside in different places across the world. This initiative was undertaken to have a shrine, the exclusivity of which along with the religious events it will host would keep the villagers and the non-resident community bonded in a way.

== See also ==
- Uniyal
