= Dhanas =

- village
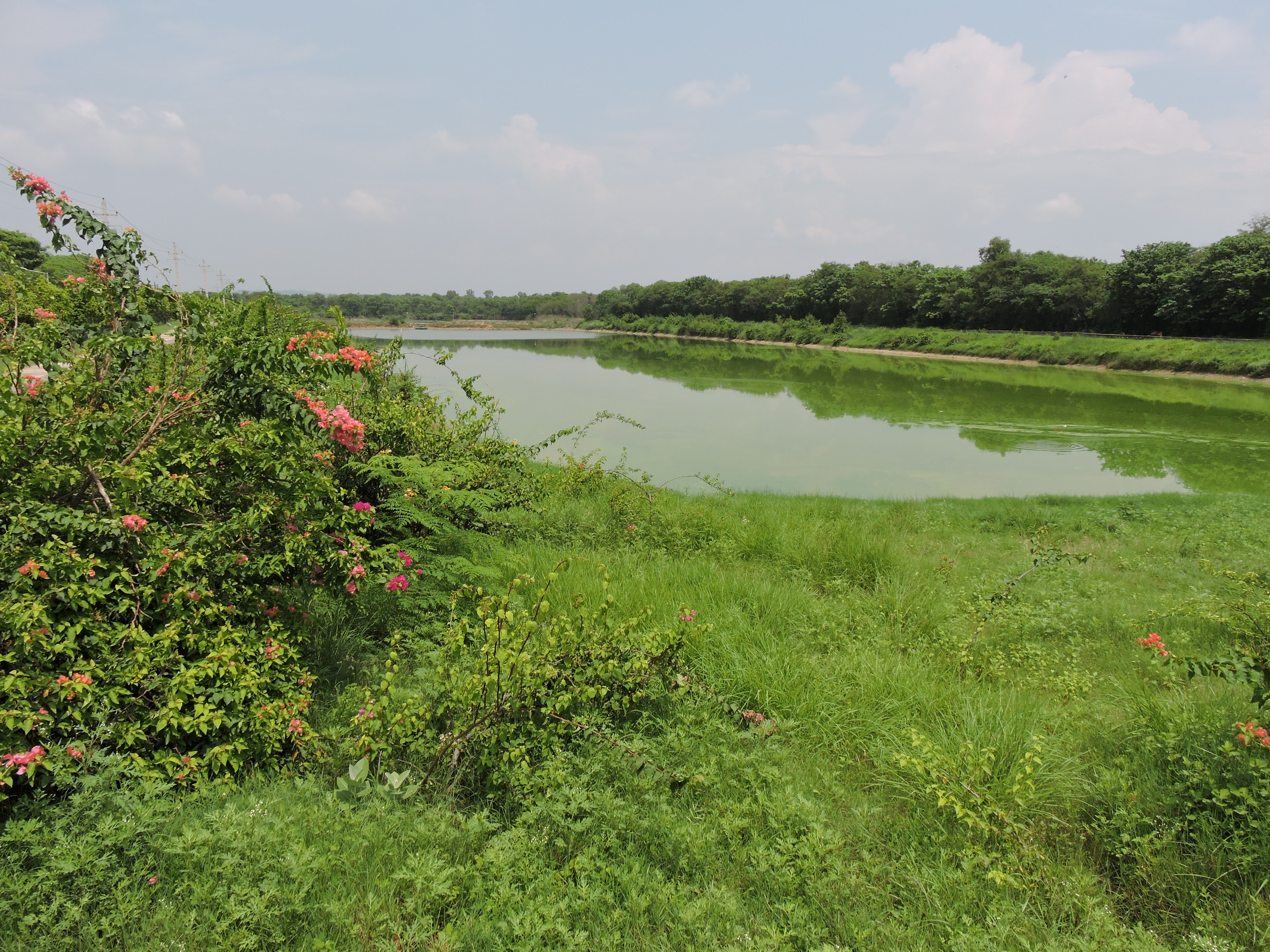
- Dhanas Lake, Chandigarh.
- Interactive map of Dhanas
- Coordinates: 30.7688416°N 76.7540559°E
- Country: India
- State: Chandigarh

Government
  - Type: Village Panchayat
  - Governor: vijya sankar
  - chairman: Ramayana Kushwaha
  - Secretary: Ram Kewal Pal
- Elevation: 334 m (1,096 ft)

Population (2011)
  - Total: 7,094

Languages
  - Official: Hindi, Punjabi
- Time zone: UTC+5:30
- PIN: 160014

Dhanas is a village Panchayat located in Chandigarh district in Chandigarh, India. The total geographical area of the village is about 5 km^{2} making it the second biggest village by area in the sub district. With a population of 7094, it is the second most populated village in Chandigarh.

== Demographics ==
The village is home to 7094 people, among them 4258 (60%) are male and 2836 (40%) are female. 85% of the population are from General caste and 15% are from Schedule Caste. Children under the age of six amount to 14% of the population; of which 55% are boys and 45% are girls. There are 1845 households in the village and an average 4 persons live in every family.

Population density of the village is 1418 persons per km^{2}

	Total	General	Schedule Caste	Schedule Tribe	Child
Total	7,094	6,029	1,065	0	1,002
Male	4,258	3,668	590	0	549
Female	2,836	2,361	475	0	453

=== Growth of population ===
Population of the village has increased by 132.2% in the last 10 years. In the 2001 census the total population was 3055. Female population growth rate of the village is 120.4% which is -20.4% lower than the male population growth rate of 140.8%. General caste population has increased by 141.7%; Schedule caste population has increased by 89.8% and child population has increased by 112.3% in the village since the last census.

==== Growth of population (percent) 2001–2011 ====
	Total	General	Schedule Caste	Schedule Tribe	Child
Total	132.2%	141.7%	89.8%	0%	112.3%
Male	140.8%	150.7%	93.4%	0%	131.6%
Female	120.4%	129%	85.5%	0%	92.8%

=== Sex ratio - Females per 1000 Male ===
As of 2011 Census there are 666 females per 1000 male in the village. Sex ratio in general caste is 644, in schedule caste is 805. There are 825 girls under 6 years of age per 1000 boys of the same age in the village. Overall sex ratio in the village has decreased by 62 females per 1000 male during the years from 2001 to 2011. Child sex ratio here has decreased by 167 girls per 1000 boys during the same time.

==== Change in Sex ratio 2001–2011 ====
	Total	General	SC	ST	Child
Change	-62	-61	-34	0	-167
2011	666	644	805	0	825
2001	728	705	839	0	992

=== Literacy ===
A total of 5205 people in the village are literate; 3315 are male and 1890 are female. Literacy Rate (children under six are excluded) of Dhanas is 85%. 89% of the male and 79% of the female population are literate. Overall literacy rate in the village has increased by 6%, male literacy having gone up by 4% and female literacy by 9%.

==== Change in literacy rate 2001–2011 ====
	Total	Male	Female
Change	6.5%	4.4%	9.3%
2011	85.4%	89.4%	79.3%
2001	78.9%	85%	70%

=== Workers profile ===
Dhanas has 44% (3140) of the population engaged in either main or marginal works. 65% of the male and 13% of the female population are working. 63% of the total male population are main (full-time) workers and 2% are marginal (part-time) workers. For women 7% of the total female population are main and 6% are marginal workers.

==== Percentage of working population ====
	Worker	Main Worker	Marginal Worker	Non Worker
Total	44.3%	40.5%	3.7%	55.7%
Male	65%	62.6%	2.4%	35%
Female	13.2%	7.5%	5.7%	86.8%

== Tourist attractions ==
=== Botanical Garden ===
One of the largest botanical gardens in the area was established in 2002.

=== Dhanas Lake ===
The lake is popular with walkers and birdlife, however suffers from pollution due to water runoff.

There is a floating solar plant on Dhanas lake.
