= Masi, Uttarakhand =

Village in Almora district, Uttarakhand, India

Masi Masi (Almora)
- Village
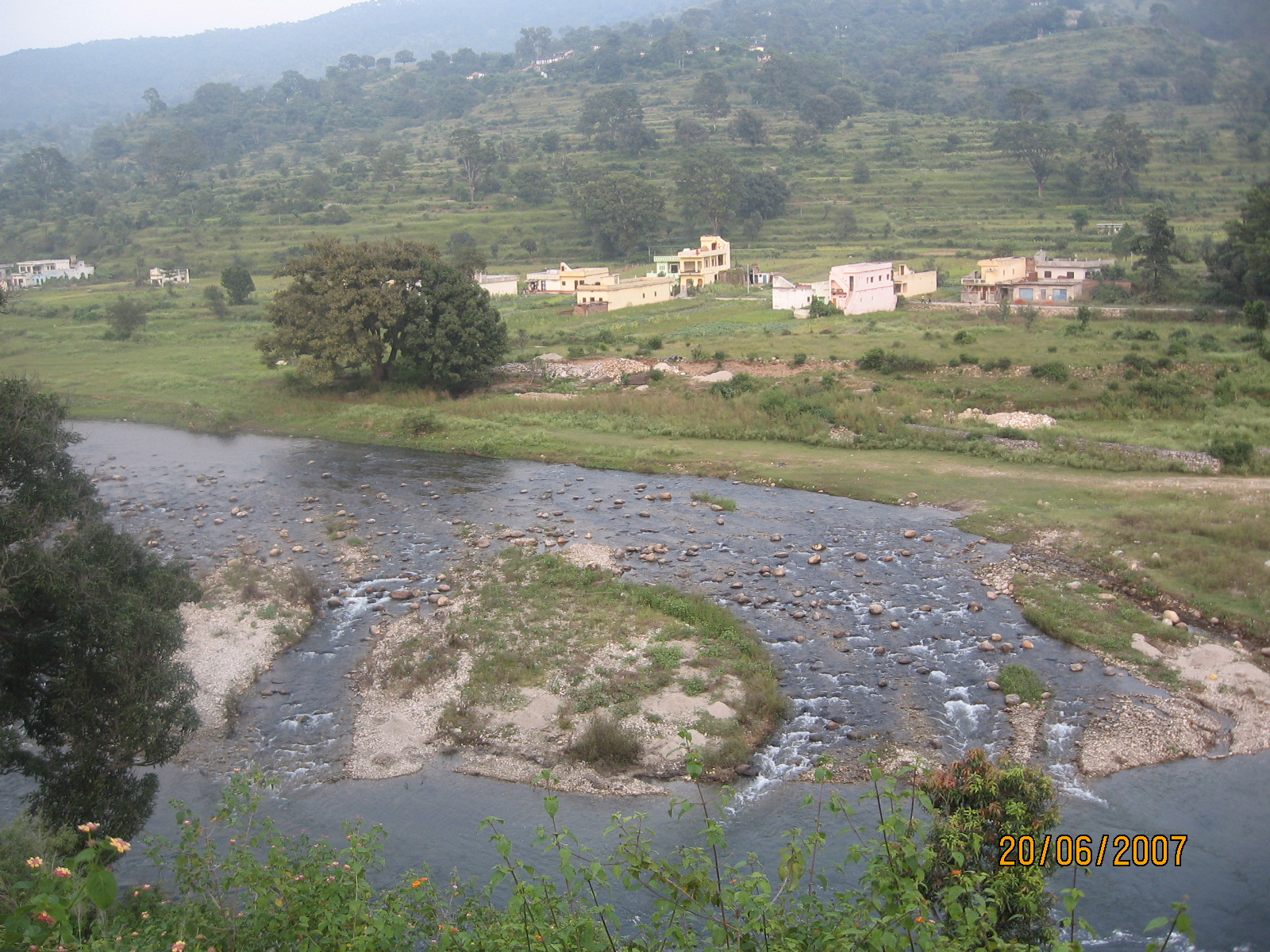
- Masi Almora

- Location in Uttarakhand, India Masi (India)
- Coordinates: 29°49′05″N 79°16′55″E
- Country: India
- State: Uttarakhand
- Division: Kumaon
- District: Almora
- Tehsil: Chaukhutia

Government
  - Type: Panchayati Raj
  - Body: Gram Panchayat

Area
  - Total: 222.97 ha (551.0 acres)
- Elevation: 880 m (2,890 ft)

Population (2011)
  - Total: 1,570
  - Density: 704/km^{2} (1,820/sq mi)

Languages
  - Official: Hindi
  - Native: Kumaoni
- Time zone: UTC+5:30 (IST)
- PIN: 263658
- Vehicle registration: UK 01

Masi is a name of a village in Talla Gewar, Chaukhutia Block of Almora district in Uttarakhand, India. This village located near eastern bank of Ramganga River.Mostly villager of this village called as Masiwal however there are various notable villages Adigram fuloria, Bhatoli, Chauna, Dubari, Kanre, Naugaon, Unchavahan. The village is home to an annual seven-day Somnath (i.e., Shivan) festival that involves throwing stones into the Ramganga river.

== Geography ==
Masi is a village located in the Kumaon region of the Himalayas, near the Ramganga River, at an elevation of about 880 metres. The village lies at approximately 29.82°N 79.28°E. The area is hilly, with terraced agricultural land and vegetation typical of the middle Himalayan region.

== Culture ==
Somnath Mela, also known as Masi Mela, is an annual religious and cultural fair held at Masi in Almora district, Uttarakhand. The fair is associated with the Someshwar Mahadev Temple and is traditionally held during the month of Baisakh, usually beginning on the last Sunday of the month.

The fair is held near the Ramganga River and attracts people from Masi and surrounding areas. It is known for its traditional rituals, folk music, cultural activities and local trade. One of the distinctive traditions of the mela is a ceremonial stone-throwing and water-splashing event in the Ramganga River involving local groups. Historically, Somnath Mela also served as an important commercial and livestock market, where people from nearby villages gathered to trade agricultural products, cattle and other local goods.

== Transportation ==
Pant Nagar Airport is the nearest airbase. The nearest railway stations are at Kathgodam and Ram Nagar. Chaukhutiya block is the nearest block from there which is about 13 km away from there. Masi Pincode is 263658 With 29.8156491 Latitude and 79.2803459 Longitude.

== Gallery ==
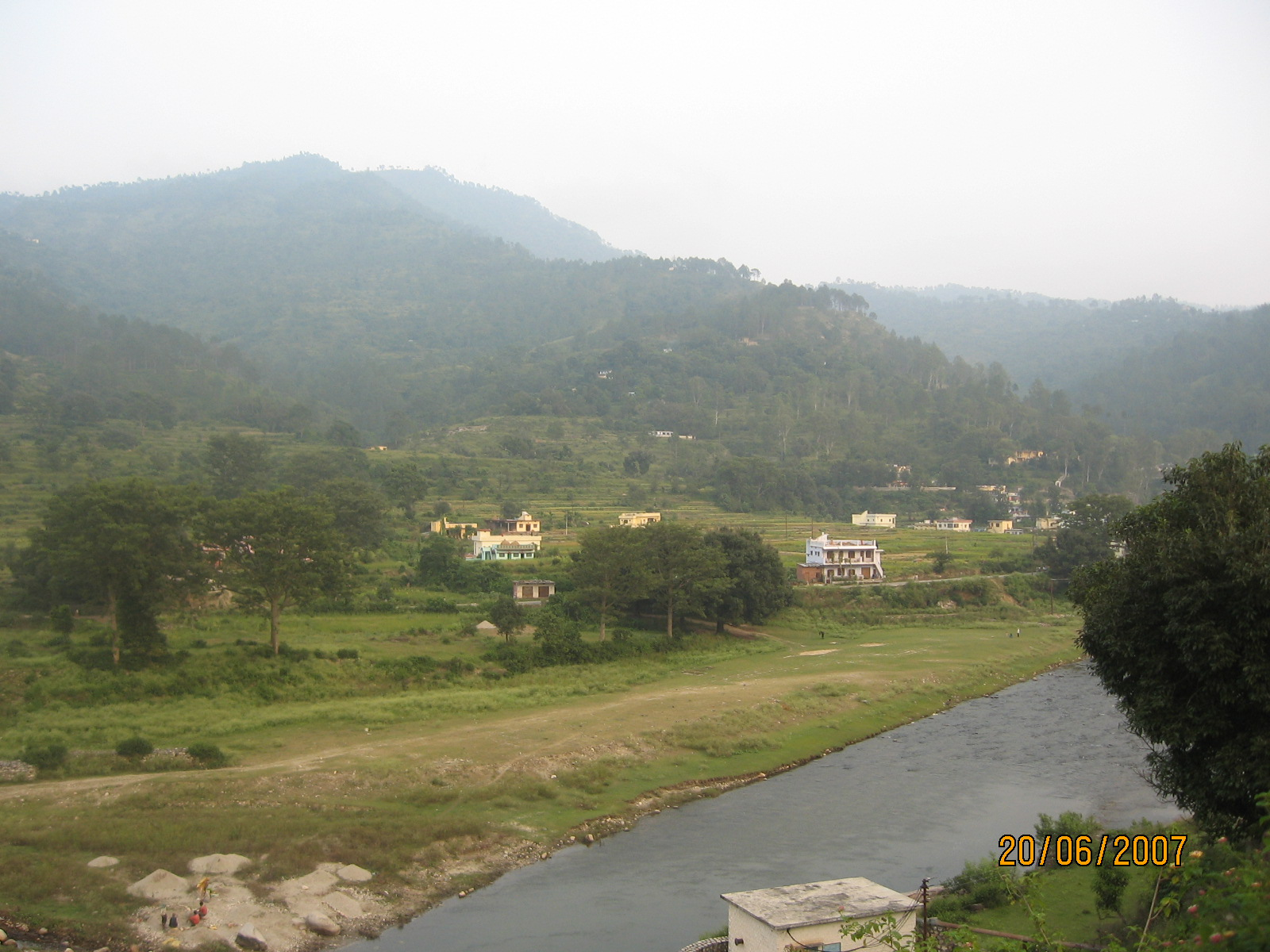
Picture taken from Gairkhet Road

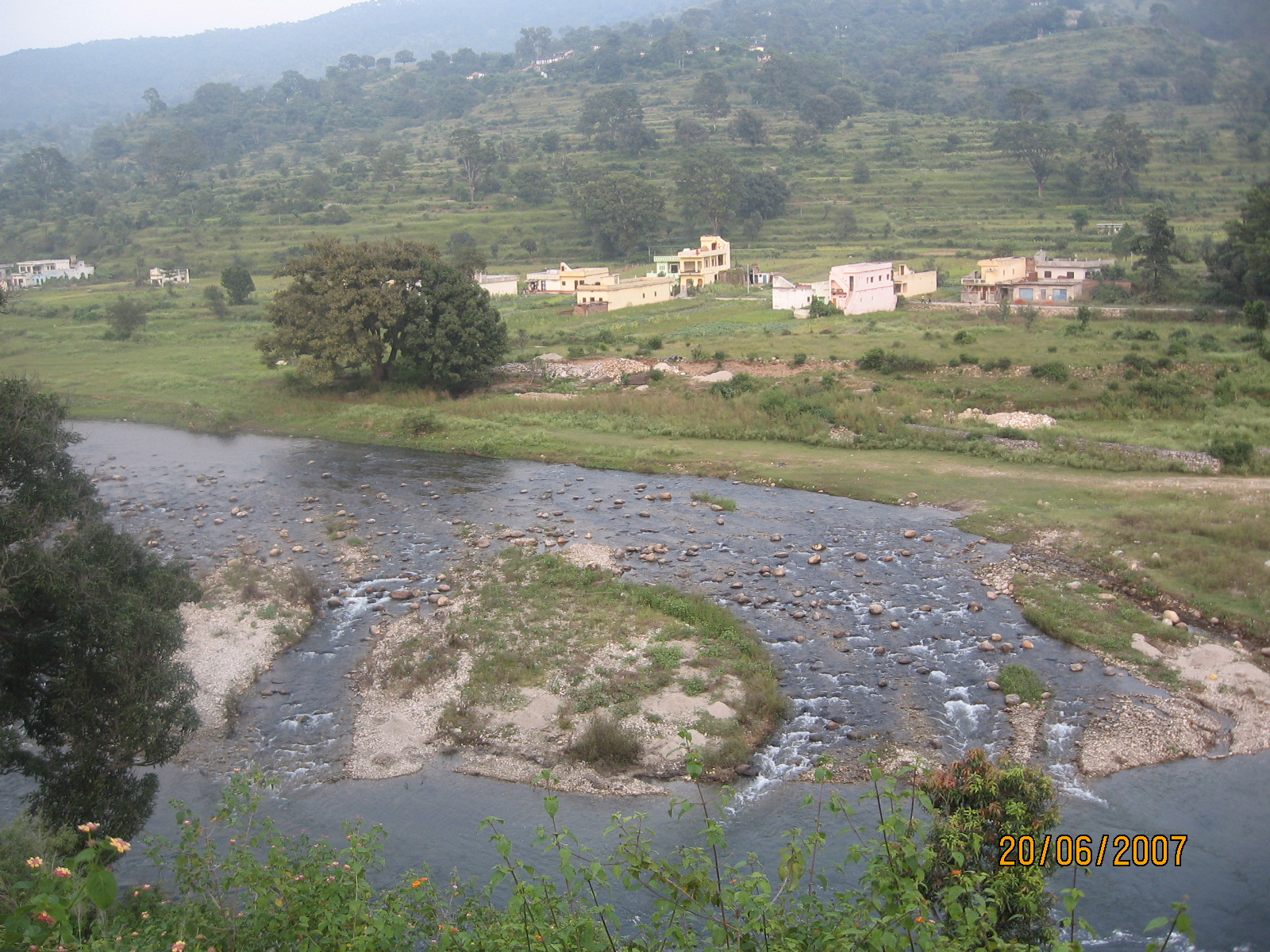
Picture taken from Gairkhet Road towards Chaukhutia
