= Jorayal Rural Municipality =

Rural Municipality in Sudurpashchim Province, Nepal

Jorayal Rural Municipality जोरायल गाउँपालिका
- Rural Municipality
- जोरायल गाउँपालिका Jorayal Rural Municipality (Nepal)
- Coordinates: 29.107°N 80.700°E
- Country: Nepal
- Province: Sudurpashchim Province
- District: Doti District

Government
  - Type: Local government
  - Chairperson: Durga Dutta Ojha
  - Administrative Head: Tej Bahadur Khatri

Area
  - Total: 419.09 km^{2} (161.81 sq mi)

Population (2011 census)
  - Total: 20,824
  - Density: 49.689/km^{2} (128.69/sq mi)
- Time zone: UTC+05:45 (Nepal Standard Time)
- Website: http://jorayalmun.gov.np

Jorayal (Nepali: जोरायल) is a Gaupalika in Doti District in the Sudurpashchim Province of far-western Nepal. Jorayal has a population of 20824.The land area is 419.09 km^{2}.

== Demographics ==
At the time of the 2011 Nepal census, Jorayal Rural Municipality had a population of 21,296. Of these, 72.7% spoke Doteli, 19.7% Nepali, 4.7% Magar, 1.7% Kham, 0.5% Sherpa, 0.3% Achhami, 0.1% Gurung and 0.3% others.

In terms of ethnicity/caste, 57.3% were Chhetri, 12.7% Magar, 10.2% Kami, 8.4% Hill Brahmin, 4.1% Sarki, 2.3% Thakuri, 1.4% Damai/Dholi, 0.9% Badi, 0.5% Newar, 0.4% Bhote, 0.3% other Dalit, 0.3% Sanyasi/Dasnami, 0.2% Rai, 0.2% Tamang, 0.2% Gurung, 0.1% Lohar, 0.1% other Terai, 0.1% Dura, 0.1% Limbu and 0.2% others.

In terms of religion, 96.7% were Hindu, 2.8% Buddhist, 0.4% Christian and 0.1% Prakriti.

In terms of literacy, 69.3% could read and write, 2.6% could only read 28.0% could neither read nor write.
