= Marchula =

Small town in Uttarakhand, India

- Small town
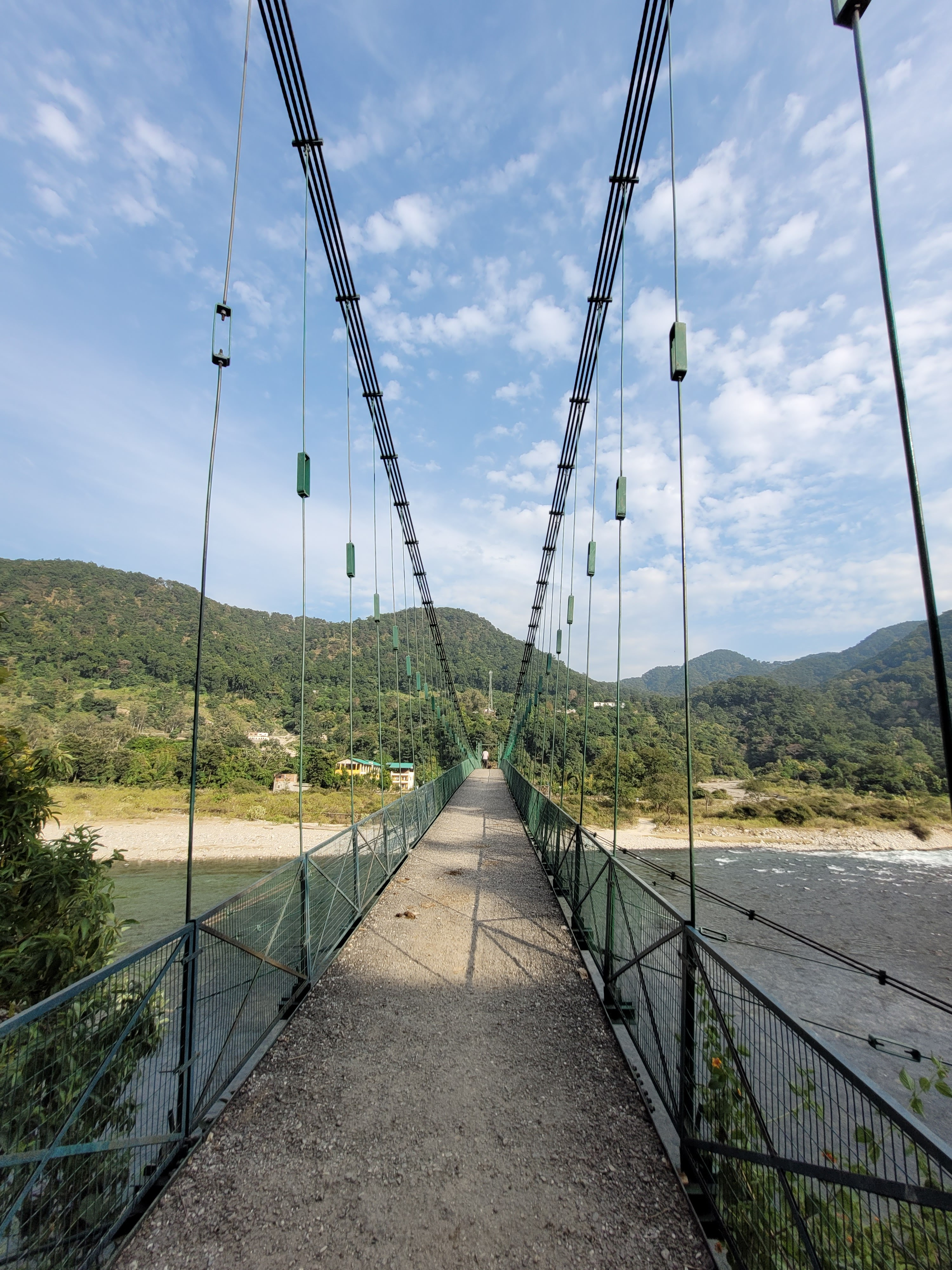
- Marchula on the banks of the Ramganga River

- Location in Uttarakhand, India Marchula (India)
- Coordinates: 29.608°N 79.095°E
- Country: India
- State: Uttarakhand
- District: Almora
- Region: Kumaon
- Elevation: 580 m (1,900 ft)

Languages
  - Official: Hindi
  - Regional: Kumaoni
- Time zone: UTC+05:30 (IST)
- Situated along the Ramganga River and associated with tourism around Jim Corbett National Park.

Marchula is a village and tourist destination in the Kumaon region of Uttarakhand, India. It is situated along the Ramganga River and is known for its forested landscape, riverside scenery and proximity to Jim Corbett National Park. Marchula is an increasingly popular base for nature tourism, wildlife experiences and peaceful stays in the Corbett region.Marchula is particularly associated with the Ramganga landscape and tourism around Corbett; Uttarakhand Tourism identifies Corbett's forests, rivers, streams and wildlife as major attractions.

== Geography ==
Marchula is a settlement in Almora district, Uttarakhand, India, in the Kumaon division. It is situated in the Himalayan foothill region along the Ramganga River. The settlement lies at approximately 29.606°N 79.093°E. The surrounding landscape is characterized by forested hills, steep slopes and river valleys. The Ramganga flows through a relatively narrow valley in this part of the Kumaon region and forms part of the drainage system of the Ganges basin. Downstream from Marchula, the river continues towards the foothills and the Corbett National Park landscape.Marchula is located near the western part of Almora district, close to the boundary with the Pauri Garhwal district. Its geographical setting places it within a transition zone between the mountainous terrain of the Kumaon Himalaya and the lower foothills. The surrounding forests and riverine environment support a diverse range of flora and fauna.

== Climate ==
The climate is influenced by its Himalayan foothill location and the summer monsoon. Rainfall is concentrated during the monsoon season, when the level and discharge of the Ramganga can increase substantially. Government hydrological records maintain observations of river discharge, rainfall and temperature at Marchula.

== Gallery ==
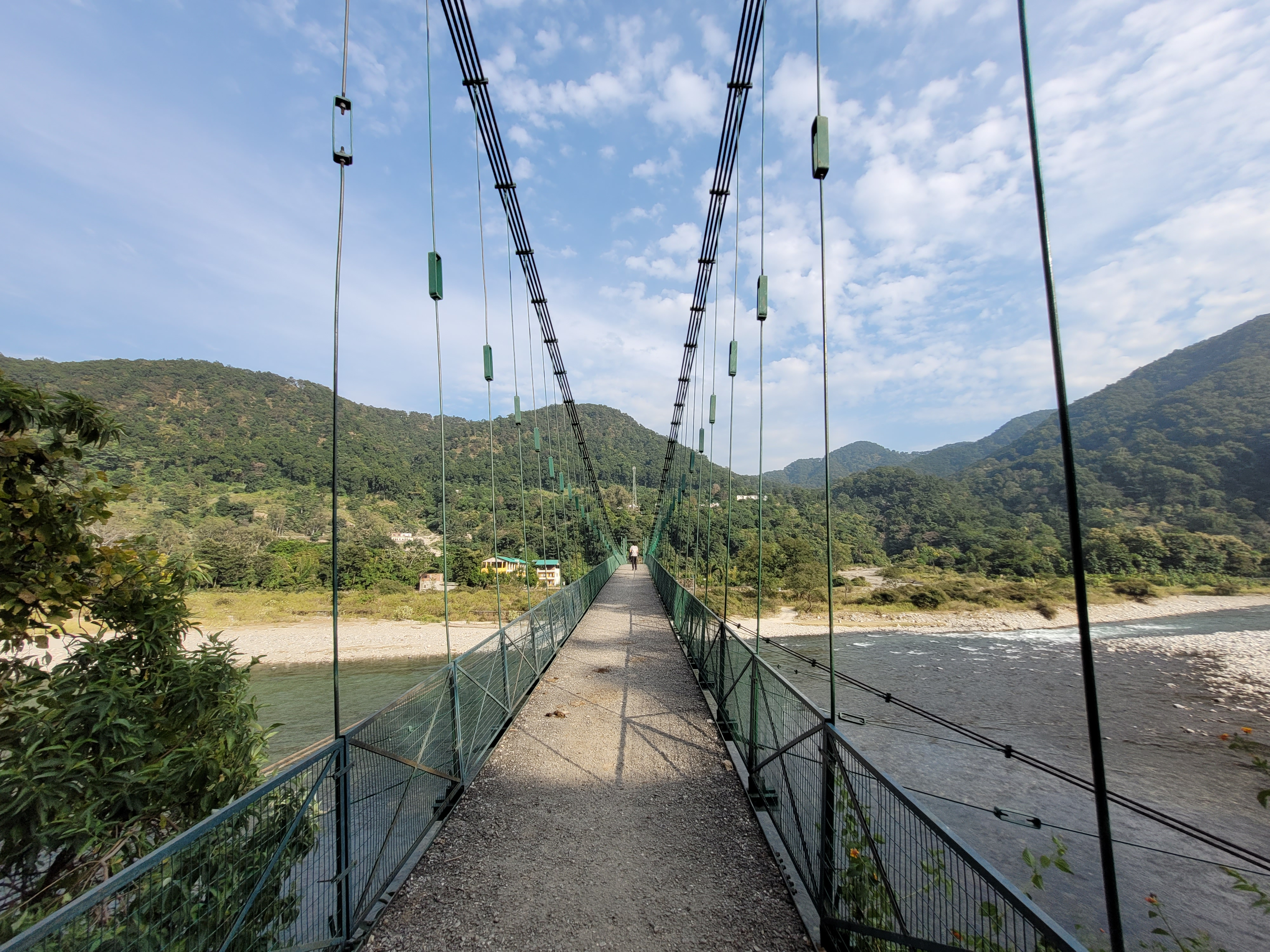
Marchula Bridge

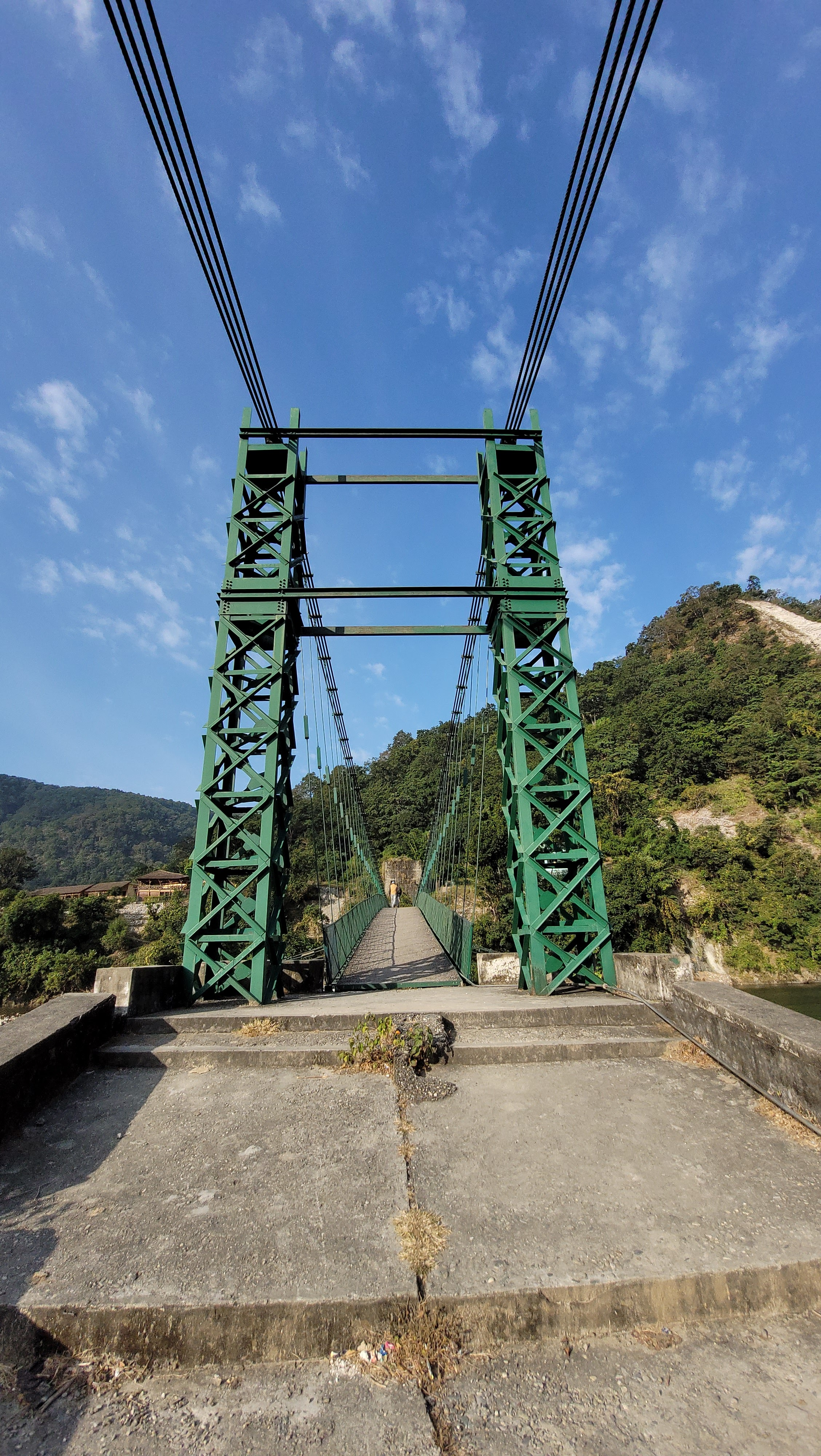
Entry to bridge

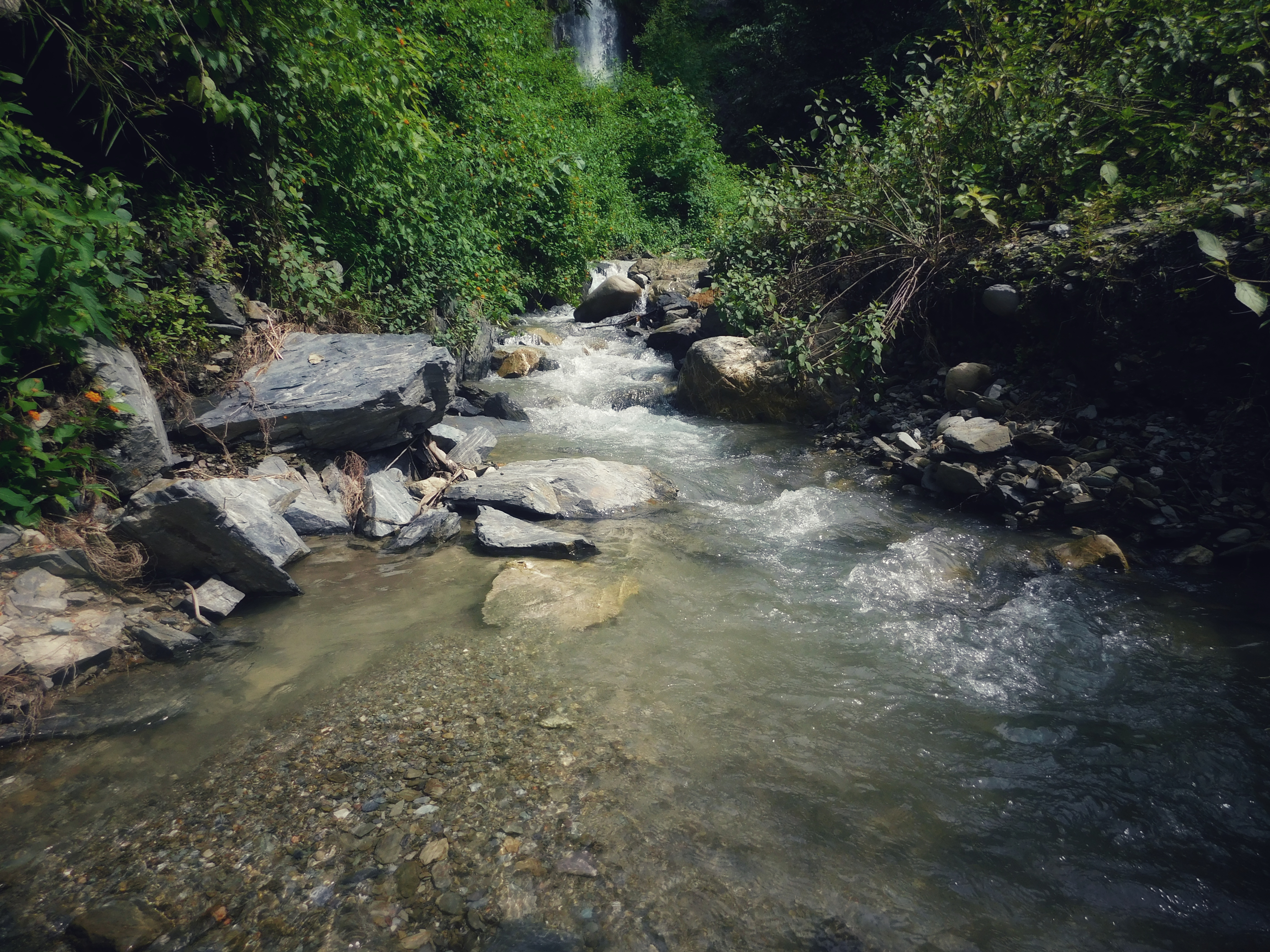
Waterfall at Marchula
