= Doti District =

Coordinates: 29°16′N 80°56′E

Doti District डोटी जिल्ला
- District
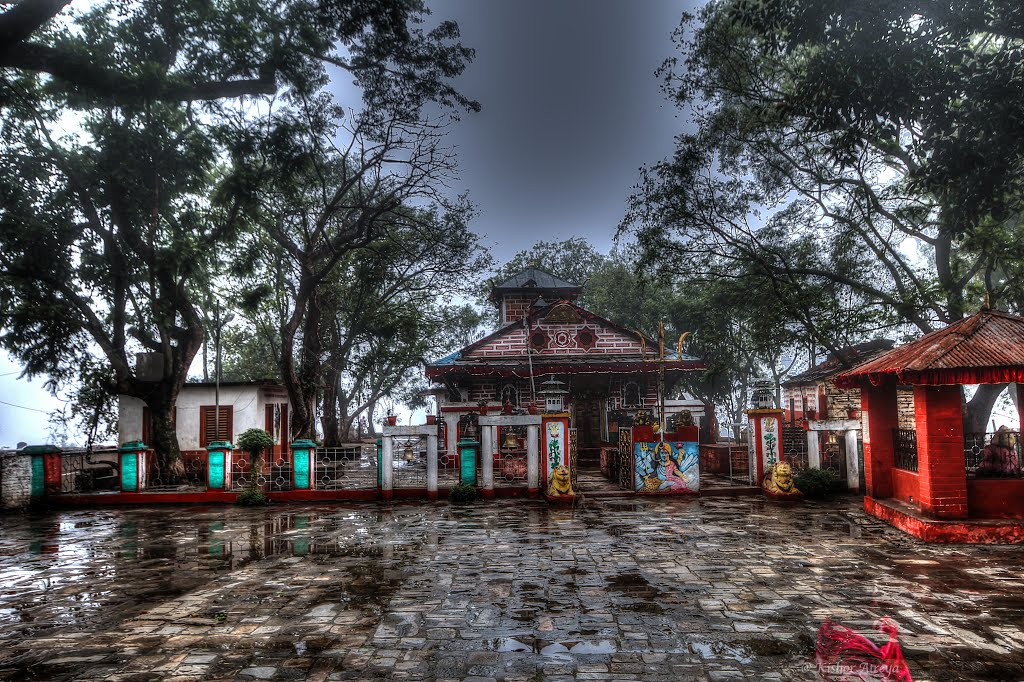
- Saileswori Temple

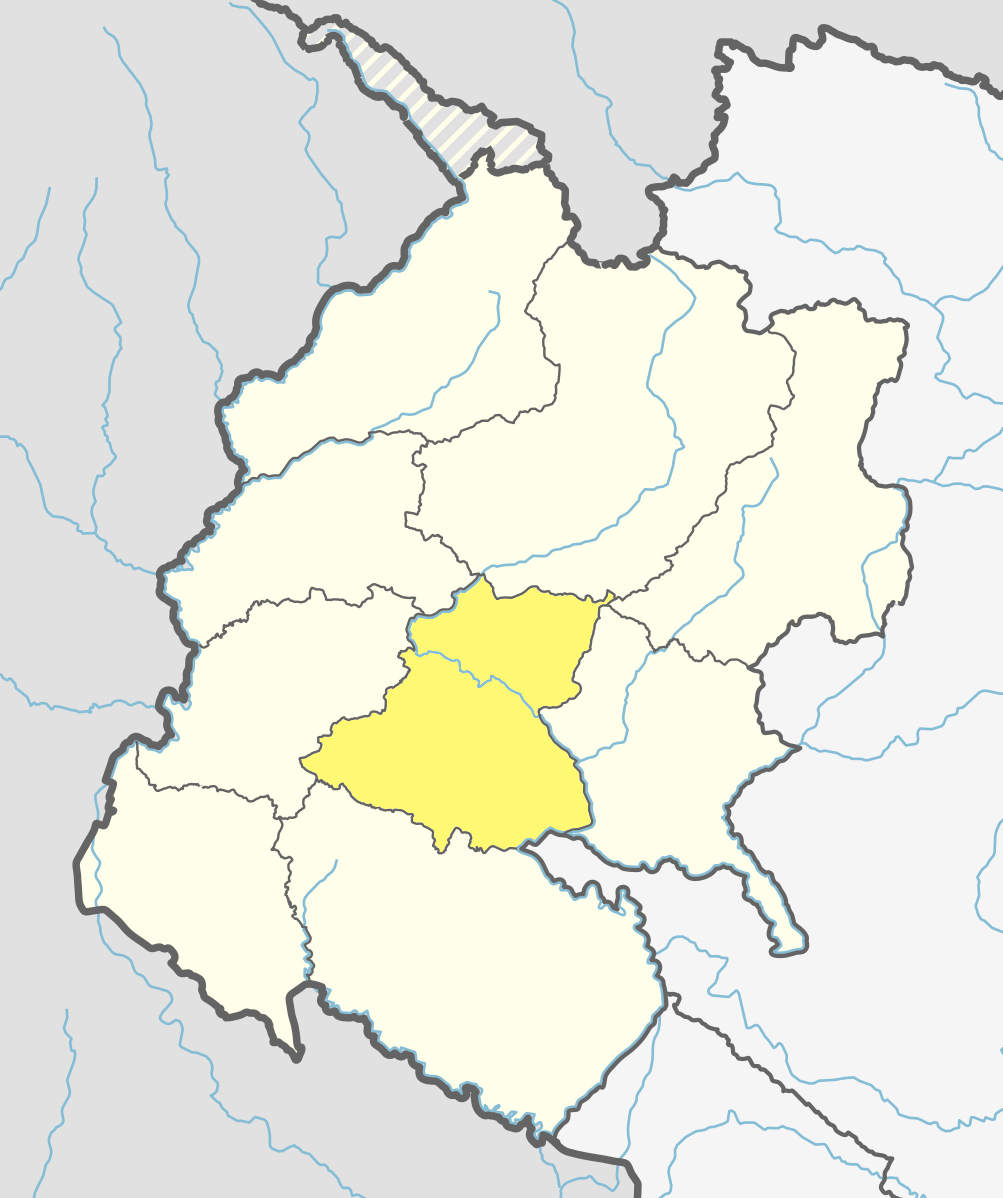
- Location of Doti District
- Country: Nepal
- Province: Sudurpashchim Province
- Admin HQ.: Silgadhi

Government
  - Type: Coordination committee
  - Body: DCC, Doti

Area
  - Total: 2,025 km^{2} (782 sq mi)

Population (2011)
  - Total: 211,746
  - Density: 104.6/km^{2} (270.8/sq mi)
- Time zone: UTC+05:45 (NPT)
- Main Language(s): Doteli

Doti District (Nepali: डोटी जिल्ला pronounced [ɖoʈi]), part of Sudurpashchim Province, is one of the seventy-seven districts of Nepal. This district, with Silgadhi as its headquarters, covers an area of 2,025 square kilometres (782 sq mi) with a population of 207,066 in 2001 and increasing marginally to 211,746 in 2011.

== History ==
Doti was a medieval kingdom of Kumaon. It was founded by Niranjan Malla Dev, the last son of the Katyuri dynasty and younger brother of Abhay Pal of Askot. Previously, the area between Ramganga in the west and the Karnali River in the east was under the control of the Raikas (rulers of the Doti kingdom, alternately Kumaun or Rainka Maharaj).

Ancient Doti was a part of Kumaon Kingdom. Now, remaining Kumaon region is part of Uttrakhand, a state in modern-day india, Nepal's neighboring country. Kingdom of Kumaon lost Doti during the expansion of Nepal Kingdom in 1790. It was formed after the Katyuri Kingdom's disintegration during the 13th century. Doti was one of eight different princely states formed after the disintegration, and all claim Katyuri heritage. The seven other known states are:

- Baijnath-Katyuri
- Dwarahat
- Baramandal
- Askot
- Sira
- Sora
- Sui (Kali Kumaon)

The Katyuri Kingdom's dissolution is attributed to the invasion of Khas Kings Ashoka Challa and Krachalla, from the Karnali zone (Dullu) in 1191 and 1223 respectively. Later, the whole land between Ramganga in the west (Uttarakhand) and the Karnali in the east (which divides the far western region from other parts of Nepal), came under the Raikas' rule — after the establishment of the Katyuri's dynastic Raikas Doti. Brahma Dev Mandi at Kanchanpur; a district within Mahakali, was established by Katyuri King Brahma Dev.

=== Raikas of Doti and their lineage ===
Historical evidence of the following raikas has been discovered:

- Niranjan Malla Dev (founder of Doti Kingdom beginning of the 13th century)
- Nagi Malla (1238)
- Ripu Malla (1279)
- Nirai Pal (1353) may be from Askot as historical evidence from 1354 AD relating to him has been found in Almora.
- Nag Malla (1384)
- Dhir Malla (1400)
- Ripu Malla (1410)
- Anand Malla (1430)
- Balinarayan Malla (1400)
- Sansar Malla (1442)
- Kalyan Malla (1443)
- Suratan Malla (1478)
- Kriti Malla (1482)
- Prithivi Malla (1488)
- Medini Jay Malla (1512)
- Ashok Malla (1517)
- Raj Malla (1539)
- Arjun Malla/Shahi (1500)
- Bhupati Malla/Shahi (1558)
- Sagaram Shahi (1567)
- Hari Malla/Shahi (1581; last Raika of Sira, and the adjoining part of Nepal)
- Rudra Shahi (1630)
- Vikram Shahi (1642)
- Mandhata Shahi (1671)
- Raghunath Shahi (1690)
- Hari Shahi (1720)
- Krishna Shahi (1760)
- Deep Shahi (1785)
- Prithivi Pati Shahi (1790; He had fought against the Nepali army and also with the British in 1814 AD)

=== Conflict with Kingdom Of Nepal ===
The historic place of war between the Doti Kingdom and Nepal kingdom during the period of Expanding Kingdom of Nepal in 1790, is Nari-Dang which lies on the bank of the Seti River and Dumrakot was the base of the Doti Kingdom during the fighting against the Gorkhalis.

Doti was captured by Nepali/Gorkhali forces, and the Nepali rulers went on to destroy several historical sites in Doti — attempting to cover its legendary bravery and tenacity. The Dotyali people were also subject to ethnic prejudice, and were frequently excluded from government jobs and offices of state. Somehow in 1950, a few Dotyalis established their identities as national heroes based solely on their courage, daring, and contribution to their country. Noted among them are Martyr Dashrath Chand Ministry of Home Affairs, Martyr Bhim Dutta Pant Ministry of Home Affairs, and K.I. Singh, a revolutionary leader who later became prime minister.

== Geography and climate ==
Climate Zone	Elevation Range	% of Area
Lower Tropical	below 300 meters (1,000 ft)	0.1%
Upper Tropical	300 to 1,000 meters 1,000 to 3,300 ft.	22.2%
Subtropical	1,000 to 2,000 meters 3,300 to 6,600 ft.	58.8%
Temperate	2,000 to 3,000 meters 6,400 to 9,800 ft.	17.6%
Subalpine	3,000 to 4,000 meters 9,800 to 13,100 ft.	1.2%

== Demographics ==
Historical population
Census year	Pop.	±% p.a.
1981	153,135	—
1991	167,168	+0.88%
2001	207,066	+2.16%
2011	211,746	+0.22%
2021	205,683	−0.29%
Source: Citypopulation

At the time of the 2021 Nepal census, Doti District had a population of 204,831. 10.79% of the population is under 5 years of age. It has a literacy rate of 70.74% and a sex ratio of 1188 females per 1000 males. 64,367 (31.42%) lived in municipalities.

Castes/ethnic groups in Doti district (2021)
1. Chhetri (59.9%)
2. Kami (11.7%)
3. Damai (7.07%)
4. Bahun (6.75%)
5. Sarki (5.37%)
6. Magar (3.55%)
7. Thakuri (3.50%)
8. Others (2.16%)

Khas people make up a majority of the population with 95% of the population. Chhetris make up 60% of the population, while Khas Dalits make up 24% of the population. Hill Janjatis, mainly Magars, are 4% of the population.

Languages of Doti district (2021)
1. Doteli (89.1%)
2. Nepali (7.30%)
3. Magar Kham (1.35%)
4. Magar Dhut (1.00%)
5. Others (1.26%)

At the time of the 2021 census, 89.09% of the population spoke Doteli, 7.30% Nepali, 1.35% Magar Kham and 1.00% Magar Dhut as their first language. In 2011, 6.8% of the population spoke Nepali as their first language.

Religion in Doti District (2021)
Religion	Percent
Hinduism	98.97%
Buddhism	0.67%
Other or not stated	0.36%

== Administration ==
The district consists of nine municipalities, out of which two are urban municipalities and seven are rural municipalities. These are as follows:

- Dipayal Silgadhi Municipality
- Shikhar Municipality
- Purbichauki Rural Municipality
- Badikedar Rural Municipality
- Jorayal Rural Municipality
- Sayal Rural Municipality
- Aadarsha Rural Municipality
- K. I. Singh Rural Municipality
- Bogatan Fudsil Rural Municipality

=== Former Village Development Committees ===
Prior to the restructuring of the district, Doti District consisted of the following Village development committees:

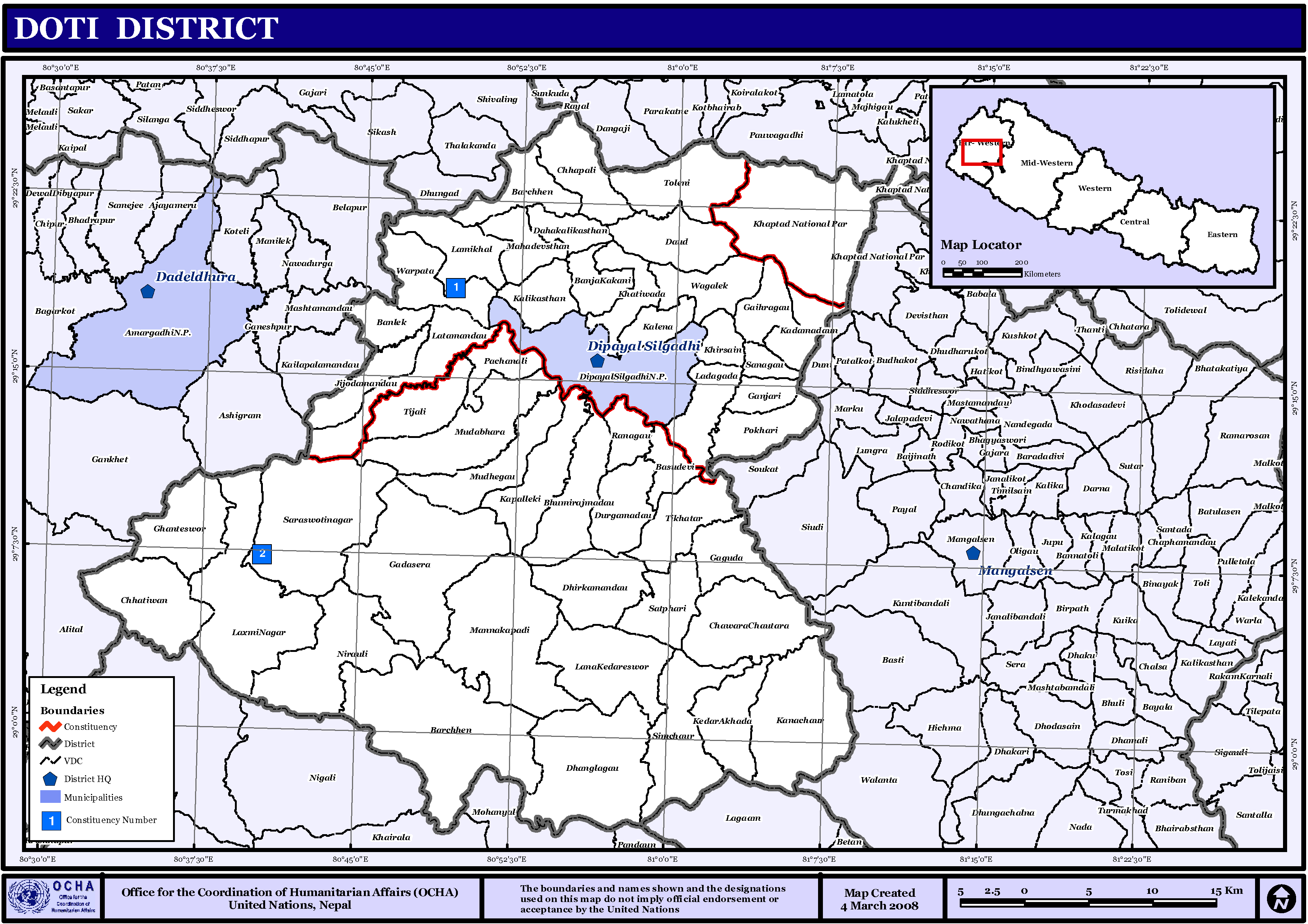
Map of the VDCs in Doti District

- Banalek
- Banja Kakani
- Barchhen
- Basudevi
- Bhawardanda
- Bhadhegaun
- Bhumirajmandau
- Changra
- Chhapali
- Chhatiwan
- Dahakalikasthan
- Daud
- Dhanglagau
- Dhirkamandau
- Durgamandau
- Gadasera
- Gaguda
- Gaihragaun
- Ganjari
- Ghanteshwar
- Girichauka
- Jijodamandau
- Kadamandau
- Kalena
- Kalikasthan
- Kanachaur
- Kapalleki
- Kedar Akhada
- Khatiwada
- Khirsain
- Ladagada
- Lamikhal
- Lana Kedareshwar
- Latamandau
- Lakshminagar
- Mahadevsthan
- Mannakapadi
- Mudabhara
- Mudhegaun
- Nirauli
- Pachanali
- Pokhari
- Ranagaun
- Sanagaun
- Saraswatinagar
- Satphari
- Simchaur
- Tijali
- Tikha
- Tikhatar
- Toleni
- Baglekh
- Barpata

== See also ==
- Doti
- Khaptad Lake
