= Seti Zone =

Coordinates: 29°15′N 81°10′E

Seti सेती अञ्चल
- Zone
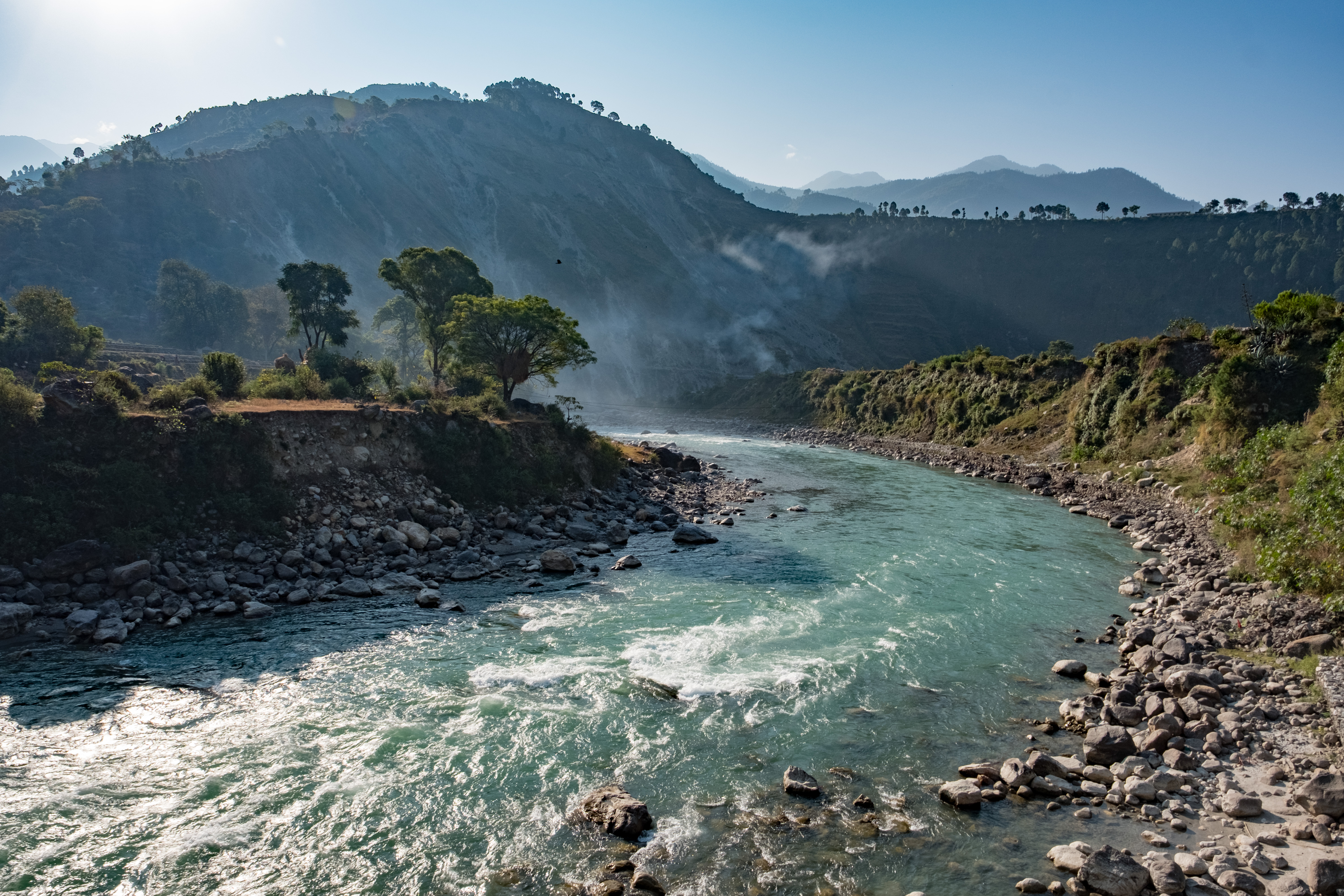

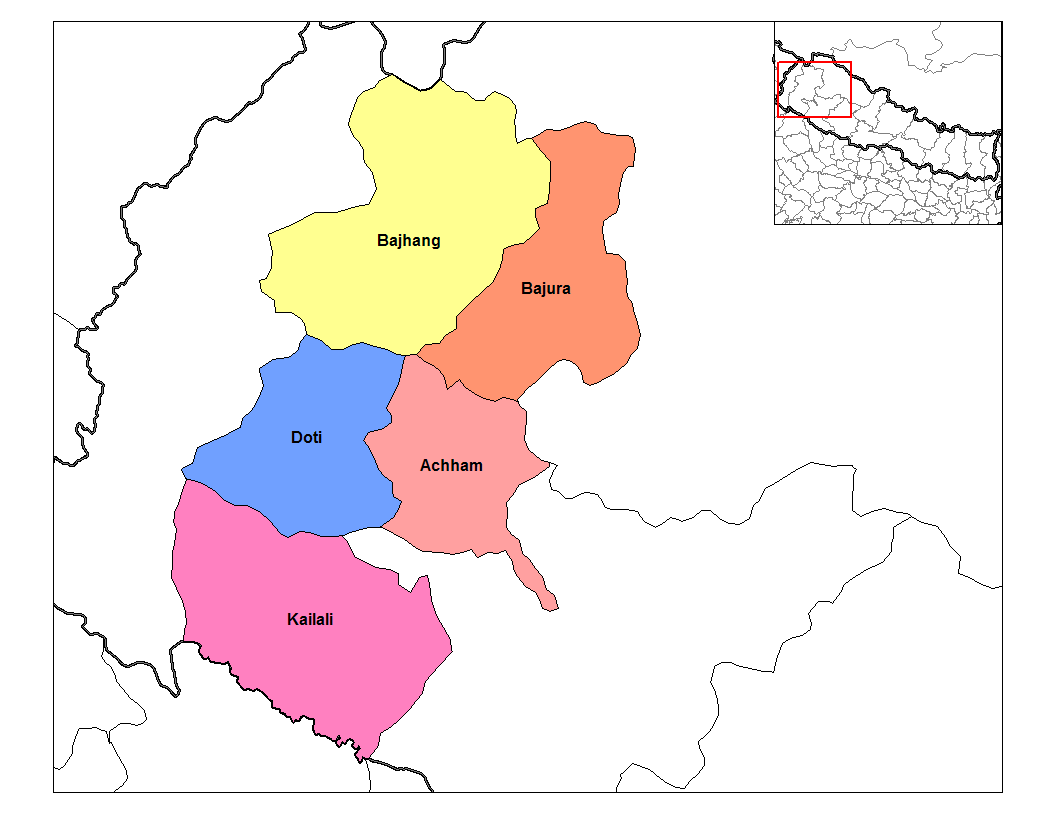
- Country: Nepal
- Region: Far-Western (Sudur Pashchimanchal)
- Capital: Dipayal
- Time zone: UTC+5:45 (Nepal Time)
- Main language(s): Nepali, Dotali

Seti (Nepali: सेती अञ्चल) was one of the fourteen zones located in the Far-Western Development Region of Nepal. Dhangadhi in the Terai is the major city of Seti Zone; headquarters are in Dipayal-Silgadhi. As of 2015, Nepal discontinued zone designations in favor of provinces; the area previously known as Seti Zone is now part of Sudurpashchim Province.

== Administrative subdivisions ==
Seti was divided into five districts; since 2015 these districts have been redesignated as part of Sudurpashchim Province.

District	Type	Headquarters	Since 2015 part of Province
Achham	Hill	Mangalsen	Sudurpashchim Province
Bajhang	Mountain	Chainpur	Sudurpashchim Province
Bajura	Mountain	Martadi	Sudurpashchim Province
Doti	Hill	Silgadhi	Sudurpashchim Province
Kailali	Outer Terai	Dhangadhi	Sudurpashchim Province

== See also ==
- Development Regions of Nepal (Former)
- List of zones of Nepal (Former)
- List of districts of Nepal
