= Chhededaha Rural Municipality =

Khaptad Chhededaha Rural Municipality
- Location in Nepal
- Coordinates: 29.42°N 81.25°E
- Country: Nepal
- Province: Sudurpashchim Province
- District: Bajura
- Municipality: Chhededaha
- No.of wards: 7

Government
  - Type: Rural Council
  - Mayor: Nar Bahadur Rawal
  - Deputy Mayor: Kunti Devi Saud (Budha)

Area
  - Total: 135.08 km^{2} (52.15 sq mi)

Population (2017/18)
  - Total: 18,575
  - Religion: Hindu
- Time zone: UTC+5:45 (Nepal Time)
- Postal code: 10600
- Headquarter: Dogadi
- Website: chhededahamun.gov.np

Khaptad Chhededaha (Nepali: खप्तड छेडेदह गाउँपालिका) is a newly formed rural municipality in Bajura District in the Sudurpashchim Province of Nepal. It was formed in March, 2017 in line with the Constitution of Nepal 2015 as per the requirement of Ministry of Federal Affairs and General Administration. The name of this municipality is originated after the name famous taal and khaptad NP of this area Chhededha Taal.

== History ==
It is formed by merging previous VDCs named Kanda, Jayabageshwari, Gudukhati, Atichaur and Dogadi.

Khaptad Chhededaha Rural Municipality has an area of 135.08 square kilometres (52.15 mi^{2}) and the population of this municipality is 18,575. It is the biggest rural municipality in terms of population and fourth biggest on the basis of area. It is divided into seven wards and the headquarter of this newly formed rural municipality is at Dogadi.

== Demographics ==
At the time of the 2011 Nepal census, Khaptad Chhededaha Rural Municipality had a population of 18,741. Of these, 99.9% spoke Nepali and 0.1% other languages as their first language.

In terms of ethnicity/caste, 73.4% were Chhetri, 8.2% Kami, 3.7% Sarki, 3.3% Sanyasi/Dasnami, 2.8% Damai/Dholi, 2.6% Thakuri, 1.6% Hill Brahmin, 1.4% other Dalit, 1.4% Badi, 0.7% Tharu, 0.3% Lohar, 0.3% Kumal, 0.1% other Terai and 0.2% others.

In terms of religion, 99.8% were Hindu, 0.1% Buddhist and 0.1% others.

In terms of literacy, 49.0% could read and write, 1.9% could only read and 49.1% could neither read nor write.
