= Badimalika =

Badimalika Municipality बडिमालिका नगरपालिका
- Municipality
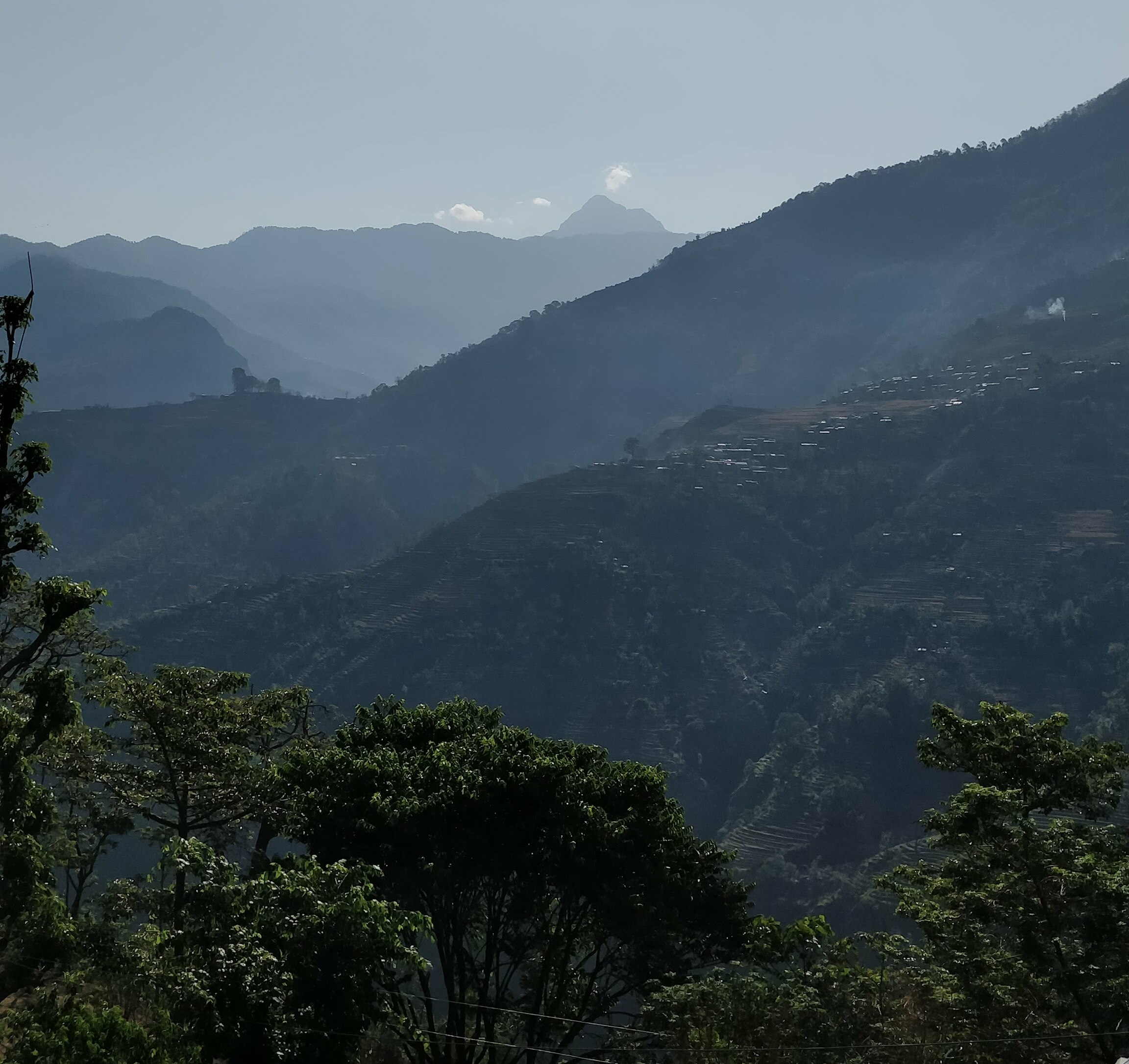
- Badimalika Peak as seen from Bamta, Bajura, Nepal

- Location in Nepal
- Coordinates: 29.44°N 81.14°E
- Country: Nepal
- Province: Sudurpashchim
- District: Bajura
- Municipality: Badimalika
- No.of wards: 9

Government
  - Mayor: Amar Khadka
  - Deputy Mayor: Nanda Thapa

Area
  - Total: 276 km^{2} (107 sq mi)

Population (2017/18)
  - Total: 16,818
  - Density: 60.9/km^{2} (158/sq mi)
  - Religion: Hindu
- Time zone: UTC+5:45 (Nepal Time)
- Postal code: 10600
- Website: http://badimalikamun.gov.np/

Badimalika Municipality (Nepali: बडिमालिका नगरपालिका) is a newly formed municipality in Bajura District in the Sudurpashchim Province of Nepal. It was formed in March, 2017 as decided by the Cabinet in line with the Constitution of Nepal 2015

== History ==
The name of this municipality is derived from the name of the famous religious place Badimalika Mai located in Triveni Municipality of this district. It is formed by merging previous 3 VDC named Martadi, Budiganga and Jugada.

== Area and population ==
The population of this municipality is about 16,818 with 3,446 household. The average size of household is 4.88. It is the least populated municipality among other municipalities of Bajura district, while it is the largest municipality on the basis of area. The total area of this municipality is (107 sq mi.). Mardati Bazar is the local trade center of this municipality. District hospital and many other government offices are also located here.

== Demographics ==
At the time of the 2011 Nepal census, Badimalika Municipality had a population of 17,259. Of these, 97.9% spoke Nepali, 1.2% Sherpa, 0.2% Maithili, 0.2% Gurung, 0.1% Tharu, 0.1% Sign language, 0.1% Hindi, 0.1% Tamang and 0.2% other languages as their first language.

In terms of ethnicity/caste, 61.9% were Chhetri, 9.5% Hill Brahmin, 7.9% Lohar, 5.8% Kami, 3.7% Damai/Dholi, 2.5% Thakuri, 1.9% Sanyasi/Dasnami, 1.7% Badi, 1.5% Sarki, 1.4% Bhote, 1.1% other Dalit, 0.2% Gurung, 0.2% Newar, 0.1% Tharu, 0.1% Tamang, 0.1% other Terai and 0.4% others.

In terms of religion, 98.0% were Hindu, 1.7% Buddhist and 0.2% Christian.

In terms of literacy, 61.1% could read and write, 3.0% could only read and 35.9% could neither read nor write.

== Geography ==
This municipality is located in the middle of Bajura district. It has Budhinanda Municipality in the East, Gaumul Rural Municipality, Chhededaha Rural Municipality and Budhiganga Municipality in the West, Budhinanda Municipality in the North while Triveni Municipality in the South.
