= Budhinanda =

Budhinanda Municipality
- Location in Nepal
- Coordinates: 29.505°N 81.669°E
- Country: Nepal
- Province: Sudurpashchim
- District: Bajura
- Municipality: Budhinanda
- No. of wards: 10

Government
  - Mayor: Janak Kumar Bohara
  - Deputy Mayor: Ram Badhur Bohara

Area
  - Total: 232.48 km^{2} (89.76 sq mi)

Population (2017/18)
  - Total: 18,776
  - Religion: Hindu
- Time zone: UTC+5:45 (Nepal Time)
- Postal code: 10600
- Website: budhinandamun.gov.np

Budhinanda Municipality (Nepali: बुढीनन्दा नगरपालिका) is the newly formed municipality in Bajura District in the Sudurpashchim Province of Nepal. It was formed in March 2017 in line with the Constitution of Nepal 2015 as per the requirement of Ministry of Federal Affairs and General Administration. The name of this municipality is originated after the name of temple and pound Budhinanda.

== History ==
It is formed by merging previous VDCs named Kolti, Kotila, Pandusain, ward no. 8 & 9 of Baddhu VDC and ward no. 9 of Jagannath VDC.

Budhinanda municipality has an area of 232.48 square kilometres (89.76 mi^{2}) and the population of this municipality is 18,363. It is the second biggest municipality in terms of population and area of Bajura District. It is divided into 10 wards and the headquarter of this newly formed municipality is situated at Kolti. It is only municipality in Bajura which has an airport.

== Demographics ==
At the time of the 2011 Nepal census, Budhinanda Municipality had a population of 18,883. Of these, 98.5% spoke Nepali, 1.4% Sherpa and 0.2% other languages as their first language.

In terms of ethnicity/caste, 52.5% were Chhetri, 9.6% Kami, 8.7% Lohar, 6.8% Hill Brahmin, 4.8% Thakuri, 4.8% Damai/Dholi, 4.5% Bhote, 3.3% Sarki, 2.7% Sanyasi/Dasnami, 0.7% other Dalit, 0.5% Mallaha, 0.5% Musalman, 0.3% Badi, 0.1% Newar and 0.3% others.

In terms of religion, 94.9% were Hindu, 4.5% Buddhist and 0.5% Muslim

In terms of literacy, 54.4% could read and write, 2.5% could only read and 43.0% could neither read nor write.

== See also ==
- Bajura Airport
- Himali Rural Municipality
- Kolti
