= Gaumul Rural Municipality =

Gaumul Rural Municipality गौमूल गाउँपालिका
- Location in Nepal
- Coordinates: 29.49°N 81.29°E
- Country: Nepal
- Province: Sudurpashchim Province
- District: Bajura
- Municipality: Gaumul Rural Municipality
- No.of wards: 6

Government
  - Type: Rural Council
  - Mayor: Hari Bahadur Rokaya
  - Deputy Mayor: Sita Rokaya(Thapa)

Area
  - Total: 314.66 km^{2} (121.49 sq mi)

Population (2017/18)
  - Total: 8,515
  - Religion: Hindu
- Time zone: UTC+5:45 (Nepal Time)
- Postal code: 10600
- Headquarter: Manakot
- Website: http://gaumulmun.gov.np/

Gaumul (Nepali: गौमूल गाउँपालिका) is the newly formed rural municipality in Bajura District in the Sudurpashchim Province of Nepal. It was formed in March 2017, when Government of Nepal announced 744 local level units in line with the Constitution of Nepal 2015. It lies to the north west of Martadi.

== History ==
It is formed by merging previous 2 VDCs named Dahakot and Manakot along with ward no. 1 of Badimalika Municipality.

Gaumul Rural Municipality has an area of 314.66 square kilometres (121.49 mi^{2}) and the population of this municipality is 8,515. It is the second biggest rural municipality in terms of area and smallest on the basis population. It is divided into 6 wards and the headquarter of this newly formed municipality is situated at Manakot. The name of this rural municipality is derived after the place called Gaumul which is the origin place of river Budhi Ganga River.

This rural municipality is famous for Potato and Allo production. It is also rich for medicinal herbs. Medicinal herbs such as Picrorhiza kurroa or कुटकी, Yarshagumba, Shilajit, Nardostachys jatamansi etc. are found here.

== Demographics ==
At the time of the 2011 Nepal census, Gaumul Rural Municipality had a population of 8,515. Of these, 99.9% spoke Nepali and 0.1% other languages as their first language.

In terms of ethnicity/caste, 79.6% were Chhetri, 9.4% Kami, 5.6% Sarki, 3.7% Lohar, 1.5% Hill Brahmin and 0.2% others.

In terms of religion, 100.0% were Hindu.

In terms of literacy, 55.2% could read and write, 3.8% could only read and 41.0% could neither read nor write.
