= Boldhik =

Coordinates: 29°31′27″N 81°46′41″E

Boldhik बोल्ढीक
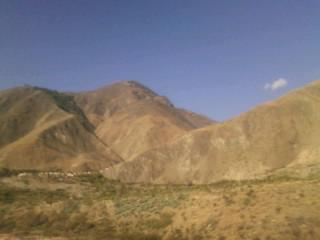
- Interactive map of Boldhik
- Country: Nepal
- Zone: Seti Zone
- District: Bajura District
- Time zone: UTC+5:45 (Nepal Time)
- Postal code: 10605
- Area code: +977-097

Boldhik is a village in Himali Rural Municipality in Bajura in the Seti Zone of western Nepal. It is the remote village of Bajura district. The village is located near the Karnali River which is the border with Mugu district of Karnali Zone. Here mostly peoples are western culture. The main cast of this place is Pandey. Including Sharki, Rokaya and Rawot.
