= Triveni, Bajura =

Triveni Municipality त्रिवेणी नगरपालिका
- Municipality
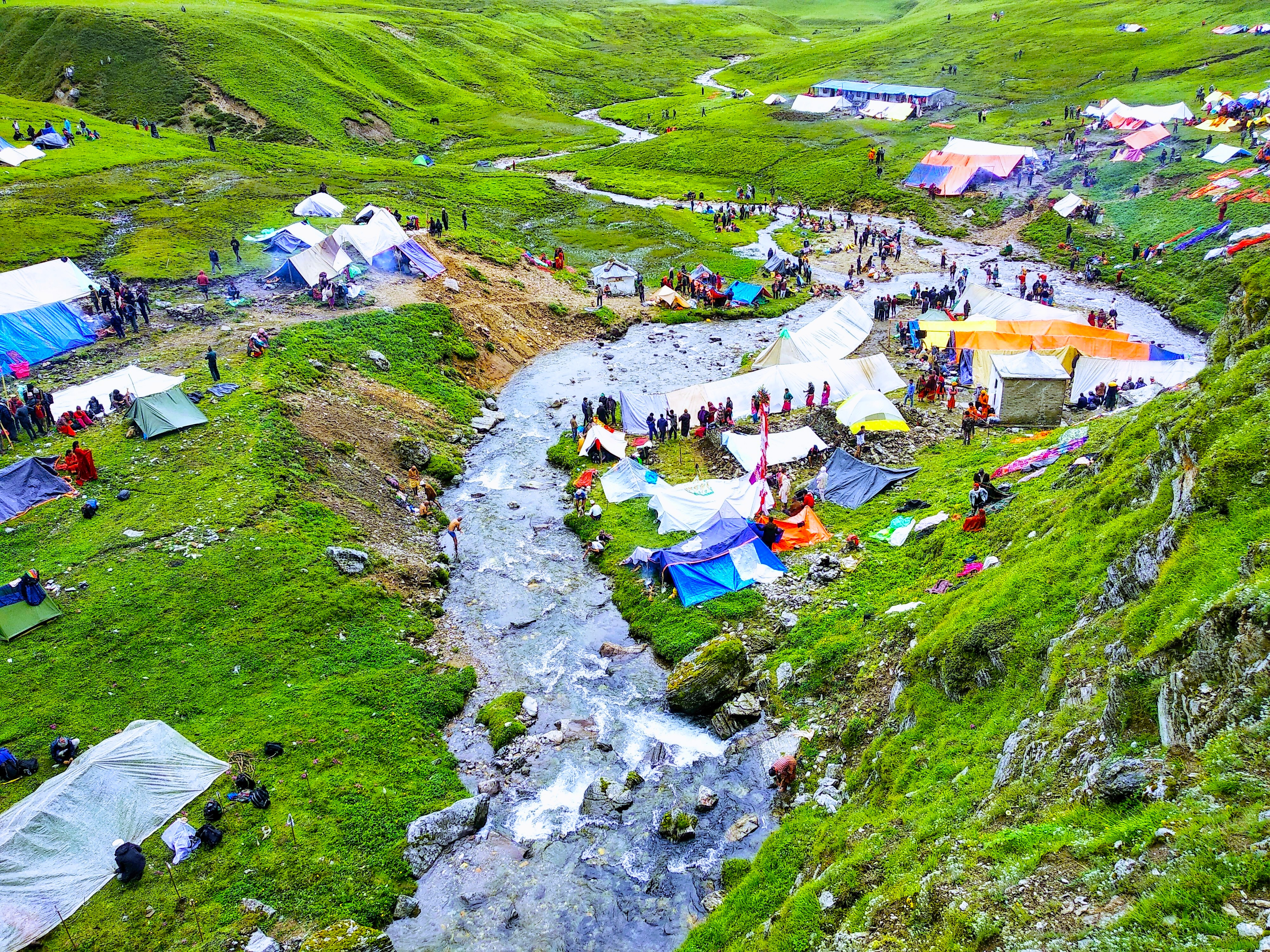
- People camping on the pilgrimage to Badimalika temple

- Location in Nepal
- Coordinates: 29.35°N 81.39°E
- Country: Nepal
- Province: Sudurpashchim
- District: Bajura
- Municipality: Triveni
- No.of wards: 9

Government
  - Mayor: Karna Bahadur Thapa (NC)
  - Deputy Mayor: Kamala Neupane (NC)

Area
  - Total: 170.32 km^{2} (65.76 sq mi)

Population (2017/18)
  - Total: 18,363
  - Density: 107.81/km^{2} (279.24/sq mi)
  - Religion: Hindu
- Time zone: UTC+5:45 (Nepal Time)
- Postal code: 10600
- Headquarter: Tolidewal
- Website: trivenimunbajura.gov.np

Triveni (Nepali: त्रिवेणी नगरपालिका) is a municipality in Bajura district in the Sudurpashchim Province of Nepal. It was formed in March 2017 as decided by the Cabinet in line with the Constitution of Nepal 2015, recommended by the Local Bodies Restructuring Commission (LBRC).

It was formed by merging three previous VDCs: Kailashmandau, Chhatara and Tolidewal. It is divided into nine wards. It has Kalikot District in the east, Budhiganga Municipality in the west, Badimalika Municipality in the north and Accham District in the south.

The population of this municipality is 18,363 of which 8,631 are male and 9,732 female. The total number of households is 3,350.

== Etymology ==
The name of this municipality is derived from the tributaries of three rivers which is locally termed as "Triveni". It is a religious place which is situated at an altitude of over 3,000 meters above sea level.

== History ==
The previous 3 VDCs named Kailashmandau, Tolidewal and Chhatara were merged and formed Triveni Municipality which has Martadi as district headquarters. Triveni is one of the 4 municipalities of Bajura District located in the mid-mountain region of Sudurpashchim Province.

== Geography ==
Triveni municipality is located in the southern part of Bajura district. It is separated by the Budhi Ganga River following from higher Himalayan region which later joins the Malagada River, which is the point from where the Triveni Municipality starts. It is divided into 9 wards numbered from 1 to 9. It has Kalikot District in the east, Budhiganga Municipality in the west, Badimalika Municipality in the north and Accham District in the south.

== Climate ==
Warm days followed by cool mornings and nights. Summers are cool, and winters are mild to cold. Snowfall is expected during the winter rain.

== Economy ==
Agriculture is the main occupation of the people of this region, followed by small-scale livestock. The agricultural production is not enough to earn a living throughout the year, so the youth and elderly people go to India, and remittance is the major source of income of people.

== Culture ==
A majority of the people follow Hinduism. Dashain and Tihar are the major festivals. Chaitalo and Aanantya are the locally celebrated festivals in the form of deuda by men and women where they express their love, joy and sorrows in the form of song. Bhuwo is another traditional dance played by the elderly and young boys using Talwar, putting on old traditional clothes and forming a circle. It is played for 3 to 5 days. This dance also shows how to fight with the enemy in the battlefield.

== Tourism ==
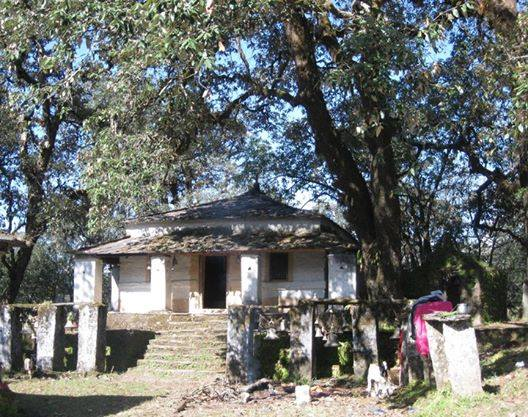
Nateshwori Temple

Tourism can be a major source of revenue, as this municipality is rich for culture and home to the major pilgrimage center of Sudurpashchim Province, Badimalika Temple, where thousands of pilgrims visit during Janai Purnima from all over Nepal and India in the belief that their wishes will be fulfilled. Nateshwori Temple is another temple located in ward no.7 of this municipality. It is a Hindu temple mainly worshiped for Devi Bhagawati, Dhalpura Devi and Kalika Devi. There is huge crowd of people, especially on the day of Janai Purnima, pilgrim who visited Badimalika return home paying visit to this temple as this temple is considered to be the elder sister of Malika Devi (Badimalika Temple). Locals visit on a regular basis, mainly during Chaite Dashain.

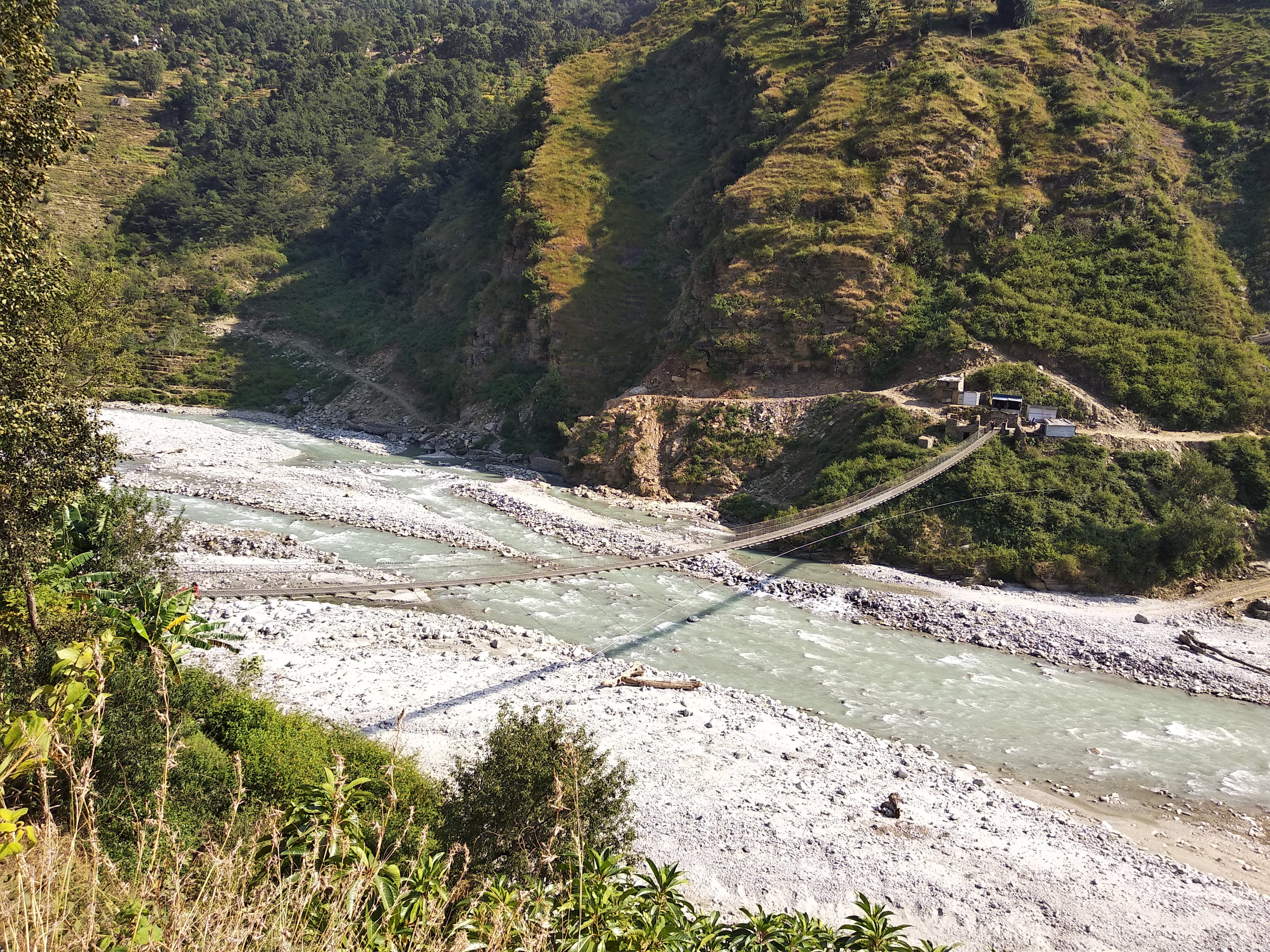
Maure Bridge

== Demographics ==
At the time of the 2011 Nepal census, the population of Triveni Municipality was 18,363, out of which 8,631 were male and 9,732 female. The average household size was 5.48. The ratio of male to female (sex ratio) was 88.69.

99.2% spoke Nepali, 0.5% Sherpa, 0.1% Tamang and 0.1% other languages as their first language.

In terms of ethnicity/caste, 63.1% were Chhetri, 11.2% Kami, 6.2% Sarki, 3.9% Hill Brahmin, 3.9% Badi, 2.8% Sanyasi/Dasnami, 2.7% other Dalit, 2.6% Damai/Dholi, 2.4% Thakuri, 1.1% Limbu and 0.1% others.

In terms of religion, 100.0% were Hindu.

In terms of literacy, 57.8% could read and write, 2.2% could only read and 40.0% could neither read nor write.

== Education ==
There are now enough Primary and Higher Secondary Schools but no Bachelor's Level and above programs. Students come to Kathmandu and other major cities to pursue their further studies. Drop-out ratio is higher although people have started to send their children to school at early age. The literacy rate is 57.79.

=== Higher Secondary Schools ===
- Ratna Higher Secondary School, Seliphal
- Masteshwori Higher Secondary School, Pandhara
- Tolidewaldanda Secondary School, Toli
- Tribhuwaneshwori Secondary School, Chhatara

=== Secondary schools ===
- Parwati Secondary School, Paima
- Kailaseswori Secondary School
- Badimalika Secondary School
- Rameshwori Secondary School
- Parwati Secondary School, Chhatara

=== Lower Secondary Schools ===
- Nateshwori Lower Secondary School
- Narsingh Lower Secondary School
- Nawadurga Lower Secondary School
- Khinni Satya Devi Lower Secondary School
- Bhageswori Lower Secondary School
- Dhalpuri Lower Secondary School
- Khapar Devthali Secondary School
- Navjyoti Secondary School

=== Primary schools ===
- Nitteshwori Primary School
- Balkalyan Primary School
- Bhawani Primary School
- Gayatri Primary School
- Gyan Jyoti Primary School
- Janata Primary School
- Maha Laxmi Primary School
- Nuwakot Primary School
- Puspa Kamal Primary School
- Sarswoti Primary School
- Janajyoti Primary School
- Triveni Primary School
- Janta Primary School
- Tripurasundari Primary School
- Bajura Model Academy

== Sports ==
Due to geographical location and less opportunities sports is not well developed here. Volleyball is the major sport played in all school and villages here.

== Transport ==
There is now road access to almost all the villages of this municipality. This has been made possible by RAP 3 (Rural Access Program funded by UKAid through the UK's Department for International Development (DFID). The Maure- Kailashmandu and Maure- Toli- Chhatara road section almost 30 K.M has been handed over to the Local government. Local government is further extending the road to inner villages with its own budget with the help of local people.

== Healthcare ==
There is no good access to hospitals and people still seek Dhami and Jhakri in first phase. Though the number of Medicals has increased in every villages but they are not run by well qualified professionals. CMA (Community Medicine Assistant) owns the majority of the medical shops who can just provide basic health care. Severe case patients have to travel to Bayalpata Hospital of Achham District or to other cities for treatment. The small health center in Municipality are without qualified doctors and are run by Auxiliary Nurse Midwives (ANMs), Community Health Workers (CHWs) and Health Assistant (HA).

== Bank and co-operatives ==
Earlier people had to travel long distance to district headquarter Martadi to make deposit, withdrawal or other banking transactions. Now with the establishment of IME(Online money transfer service) at Bamka and branch of Nepal Bank Limited at Tolidewal where the municipality office is located, it has become convenient for people of this municipality for making banking transactions.

== Internet and communication ==
Communication used to be a major problem until few year back but with the extension of Tower of Telecommunication Service providers such as Nepal Telecom, Ncell and SKY communication has become easier. Currently Ncell and Nepal Telecom provide 2G network service but other Internet service providers (ISPs) are limited to Local Administration. Radio is the main source of news & entertainment but Television is limited to few homes.
