= Himali Rural Municipality =

Municipality in Sudurpashchim, Nepal

Himali Rural Municipality हिमाली गाँउपालिका
- Location in Nepal
- Coordinates: 29.53°N 81.67°E
- Country: Nepal
- Province: Sudurpashchim Province
- District: Bajura
- Municipality: Himali Rural Municipality
- No.of wards: 7

Government
  - Type: Rural Council
  - Mayor: Govinda Bahadur Malla
  - Deputy Mayor: Raj Kala Sarki

Area
  - Total: 830.33 km^{2} (320.59 sq mi)

Population (2017/18)
  - Total: 9,214
  - Religion: Hindu Buddhist
- Time zone: UTC+5:45 (Nepal Time)
- Postal code: 10600
- Headquarter: Dhulachaur
- Website: http://himalimun.gov.np/

Himali (Nepali: हिमाली गाउँपालिका) is a rural municipality in Bajura District in the Sudurpashchim Province of Nepal. It was formed in March 2017, when Government of Nepal announced 744 local level units in line with the Constitution of Nepal 2015. It lies in the northern region of Bajura District and is also considered to be the remote place of this district.

== History ==
It is formed by merging previous VDCs named Bichhiya, Rugin and ward no. 1 to 7 of Baddhu VDC. There is snowfall throughout the year in this region.

Himali Rural Municipality has an area of 830.33 square kilometres (320.59 mi^{2}) and the population of this municipality is 9,214. It is the second smallest rural municipality of Bajura district in terms of population. It is divided into 7 wards and the headquarter of this newly formed municipality is situated at Dhulachaur.

== Demographics ==
At the time of the 2011 Nepal census, Himali Rural Municipality had a population of 9,229. Of these, 95.9% spoke Nepali, 3.0% Sherpa, 0.8% Tamang, 0.1% Maithili and other languages as their first language.

In terms of ethnicity/caste, 57.5% were Chhetri, 12.3% Hill Brahmin, 9.4% Sarki, 5.3% Thakuri, 3.5% Lohar, 3.2% Bhote, 2.7% Kami, 2.3% Damai/Dholi, 1.3% other Dalit, 0.8% Tamang, 0.6% Teli, 0.5% Badi, 0.2% other Terai, 0.1% Sanyasi/Dasnami and 0.2% others.

In terms of religion, 96.0% were Hindu and 4.0% Buddhist.

In terms of literacy, 51.8% could read and write, 3.2% could only read and 44.9% could neither read nor write.

== See also ==
- Bajura Airport
- Kolti
