= Chhatara =

Chhatara may refer to:

- Chhatara, Achham, Nepal
- Chhatara, Bajura, Nepal
