= Nateshwori Temple =

Hindu temple of Devi Vagawoti

Nateshwori Temple नाटेश्वरी मन्दिर

Religion
- Affiliation: Hinduism

Location
- Location: Triveni Municipality
- Country: Nepal

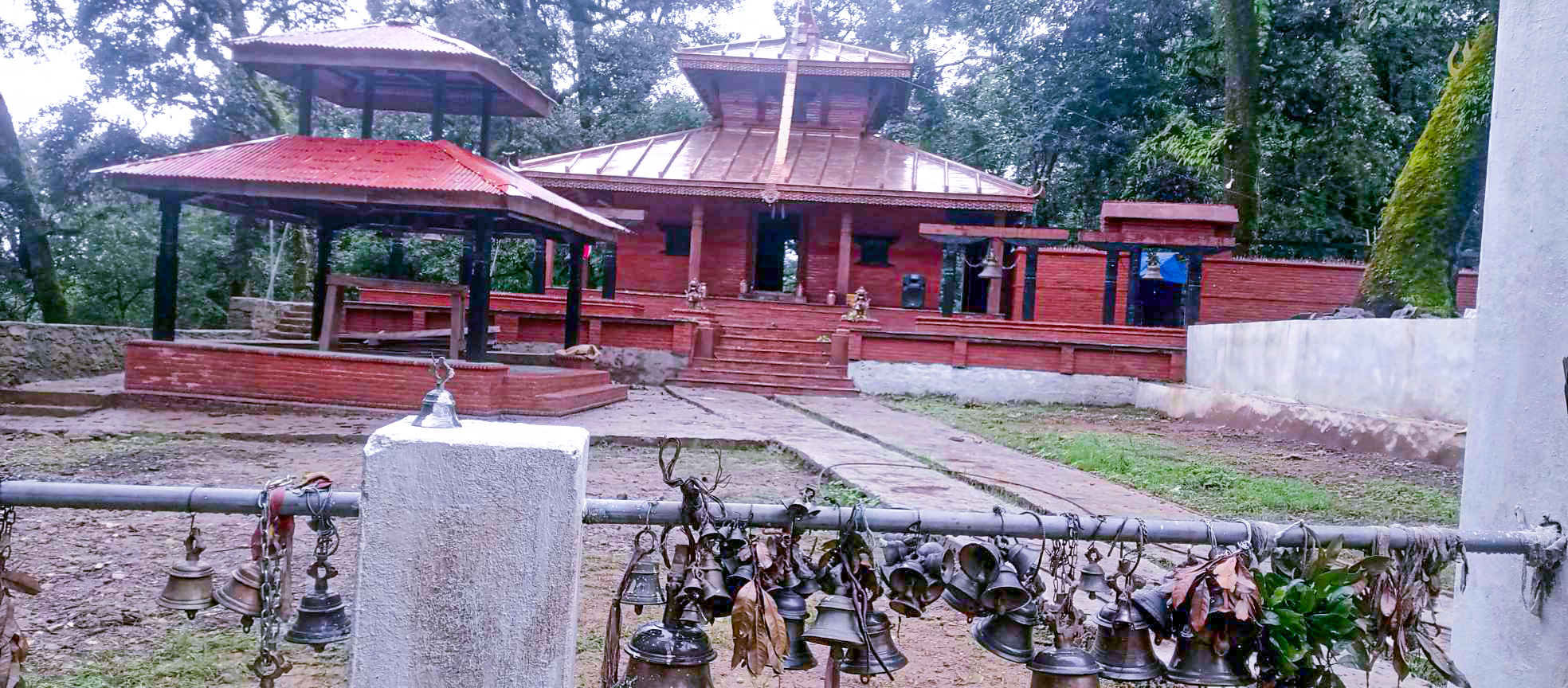
Nateshwori Temple's Grand Transformation- A Splendid Remodeled Pagoda Design.

The Nateshwori Temple (Nepali: नाटेश्वरी मन्दिर) is a Hindu temple of goddess Bhagavati located in the Sudurpaschim province of Nepal in Triveni-07, Bajura. This temple is one of the sacred temples of Hindu faith.

== Description ==
The temple considered as the open-air dancing theatre of god and goddess, also pronounced locally as नाचन्थली ( नाच:Dance थली: Theater ). This "extensive Hindu temple build in Pagoda style is worshiped mainly for Devi Bhagavati, Dhalpura Devi and Kalika Devi.

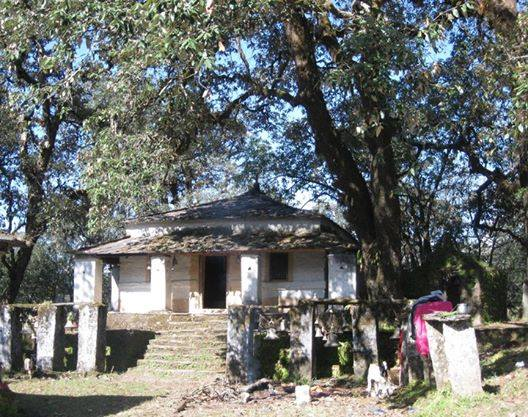
Inside this temple there is the main Temple of Devi-Vagawoti and a Temple of Dhalpura Devi . PhotoCredit:ParasBickramShah

The major festivals of the temple are Dashain, Janai Purnima and Chaite Dashain. On these auspicious occasions, devotees from all over Nepal and even from India visit the temple.

Though situated on the lap of Badimalika, this temple (नाटेश्वरी) is considered as the belongings (elder sister) of Malika Devi. Rituals of Nateshwori are carried out by two sets of priests; one being the Thakuri priests and other the Bhramin Joshi . Shahi Thakuri of Khirpata and Joshi Bhramin of Belkatte are the ones who performs the ritual and can touch the deity. This temple is opened only during big festivals and on other few special days, the daily rituals of the temple are performed in the Bhandarghar (भण्डारघर) in Thakuribada (ठकुरीवाडा) by Shahi Thakuri priests.

== History ==
Divine Encounter of King Dipraj Chhatyal

The story of Nateshwori Temple in Bajura revolves around King Dipraj Chhatyal, a ruler of the Chhatyal dynasty, who reigned over this sacred land.

One day, during a hunting expedition in the "Mallaagiri Parbat" Which is currently known as Badimalika region, the king spotted a magnificent deer. As he prepared to shoot, an unseen force suddenly restrained his bow, preventing him from releasing the arrow. Despite multiple attempts, he was unable to strike his target. That night, as he rested in his camp, Goddess Malika Devi appeared to him in a vision.

“O King, this land is sacred and must not be defiled by violence. Instead of hunting, you must honor me by building a temple upon this holy mountain. My divine presence shall bless your kingdom for generations to come.”

Moved by the goddess’s command, King Dipraj Chhatyal returned to his palace, determined to fulfill her wishes.

The Collaboration of Two Kings

Around the same time, Jumli Maharaj of the Kallyal dynasty, another ruler from the neighboring region, received a similar divine message. Recognizing their shared vision, the two kings decided to collaborate on the construction of a grand temple atop Mallagiri Mountain, which is now revered as Badimalika Temple.

This temple was dedicated to Goddess Satidevi, as it was believed that one of her left limbs had fallen at this site, making it a sacred Shakti Peeth. King Dipraj Chhatyal used black gram paste and stone for the temple’s foundation, while Jumli Maharaj contributed copper plates for its structure.

Pleased with Dipraj Chhatyal’s devotion, Goddess Malika Devi began offering him 84 varieties of food each day as a divine blessing.

The Goddess’s Curse

Curious about the origin of these sacred offerings, King Dipraj Chhatyal decided to investigate. One night, he hid near the temple and observed a mesmerizing celestial woman delivering the food. Enchanted by her beauty and the mystery surrounding her, the king attempted to capture her.

At that moment, the woman transformed into Malika Devi herself. Enraged by his actions, she cursed the king:

“Though you may be seen, neither you nor your descendants shall ever meet me again.”

Realizing his grave mistake, King Dipraj Chhatyal was filled with remorse. He fell to his knees and begged for forgiveness.

The Establishment of Nateshwori Temple

Moved by his repentance, Goddess Malika Devi instructed the king to build another temple in the Nateshwori forest area, near his palace. She revealed that her elder sister, Goddess Devi Bhagawati, would also be venerated there.

Following the goddess’s command, King Dipraj Chhatyal established Nateshwori Temple, which became an essential pilgrimage site. Worshippers were required to pay homage at Nateshwori Temple after visiting Badimalika, ensuring the fulfillment of their prayers and desires.

The sacred location of Nateshwori Temple was chosen with divine guidance—circled and sanctified by Malika Devi’s celestial lion and a black cobra, symbols of protection and power. Following the goddess's guidance, king Dipraj Chhatyal established the Nateshwori Temple and began his devotion, leading to the tradition of having Chhatyal Thakuri Priests in the temple.

A Legacy Preserved Through Generations

The legend of Nateshwori Temple is preserved through traditional ‘Magal’ and ‘Chachari’ songs, sung by the elderly during religious ceremonies and festivals. These songs recount King Dipraj Chhatyal’s divine vision, the curse, and the sacred bond between Badimalika and Nateshwori Temples.

To this day, the Chhatyal Thakuri community refrains from directly entering Badimalika Temple, Instead, they offer their respects in the nearby Triveni area without entering the Malika Temple precincts. This enduring practice reflects their deep respect for their history and heritage, influenced by the goddess's solemn admonition and the establishment of the Nateshwori Temple.
