= Barhabise =

Barhabise may refer to:

- Barhabise, Bagmati, Nepal
- Barhabise, Seti, Nepal
