= Badimalika Temple =

Hindu temple in Sudurpashchim, Nepal

Badamalika temple
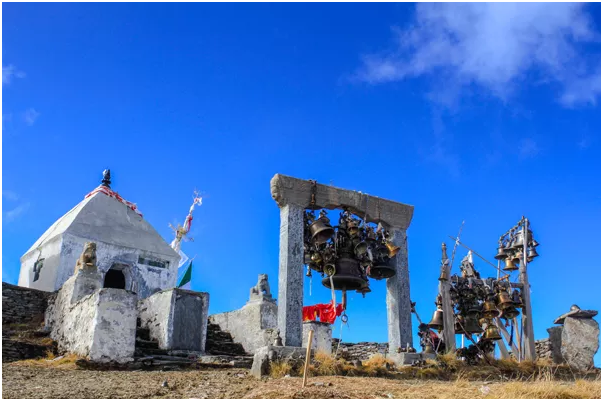
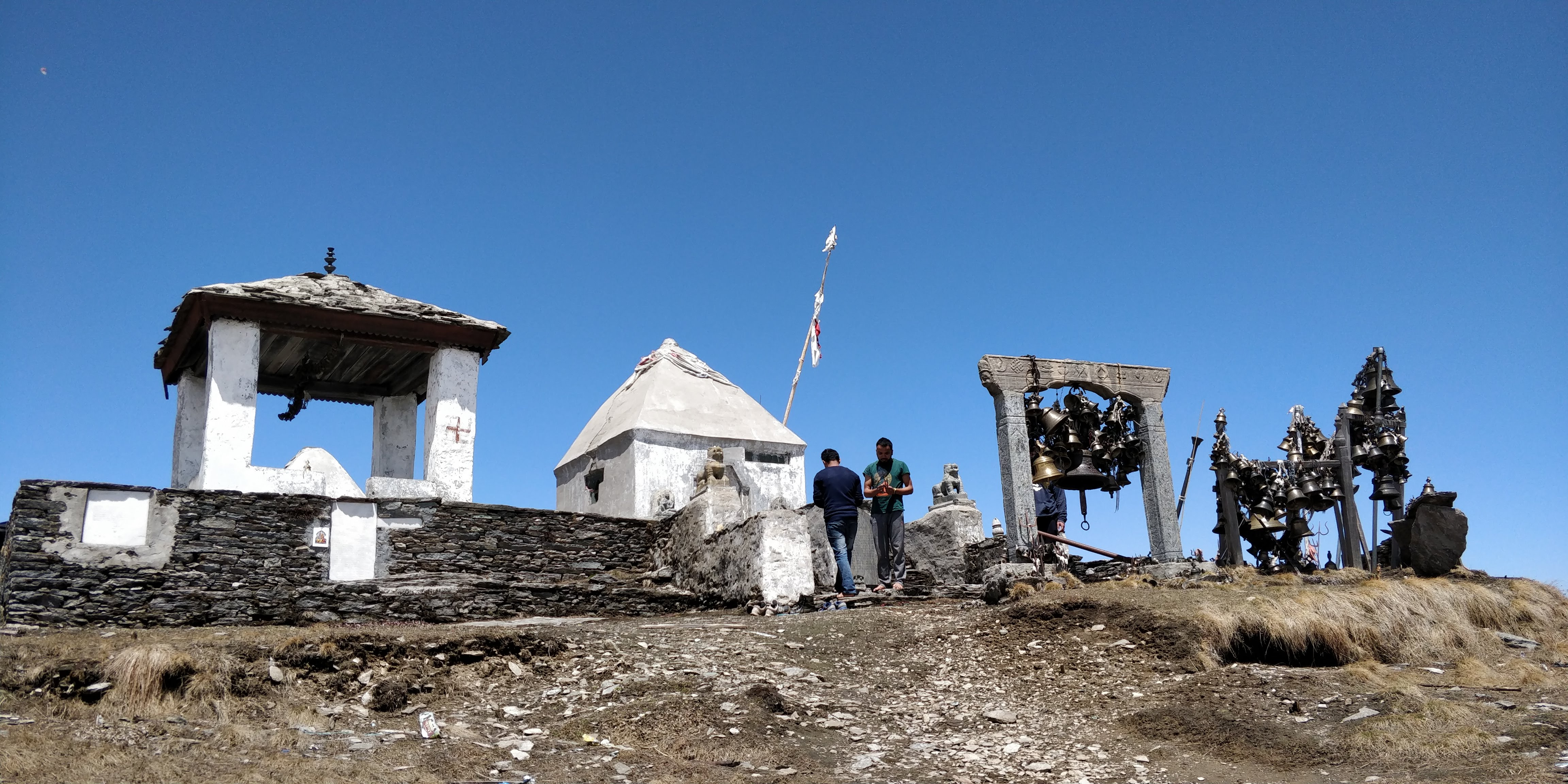
- Clockwise from top Badimalika Temple

- Badimalika Temple in Nepal

Religion
- Affiliation: Hinduism
- District: Bajura
- Deity: Shakti
- Festivals: Ganga Dussehra, Shrwan Shukla chaturdashi

Location
- Location: Kailashmandau, Bajura
- State: Seti
- Country: Nepal
- Interactive map of Badamalika temple
- Coordinates: 29.346916°N 81.477488°E

Architecture
- Type: Pagoda Style

Badimalika Temple is a Hindu temple. It is located in Triveni Municipality, Bajura district of Sudurpashchim Province. It is one of the major temples in Nepal. It is dedicated to Bhagwati. Malika Chaturdashi is its major festival. It is served by two priests, one representing the Kalikot district, and the other Bajura district .

The Badimalika–Ramaroshan Forest Conservation Area is the newest addition to Nepal's network of protected zones, formally declared by the Sudurpaschim Province government on August 12, 2026. It bridges two ecologically and culturally significant regions in the Far-West region under a single conservation framework.

== Story ==
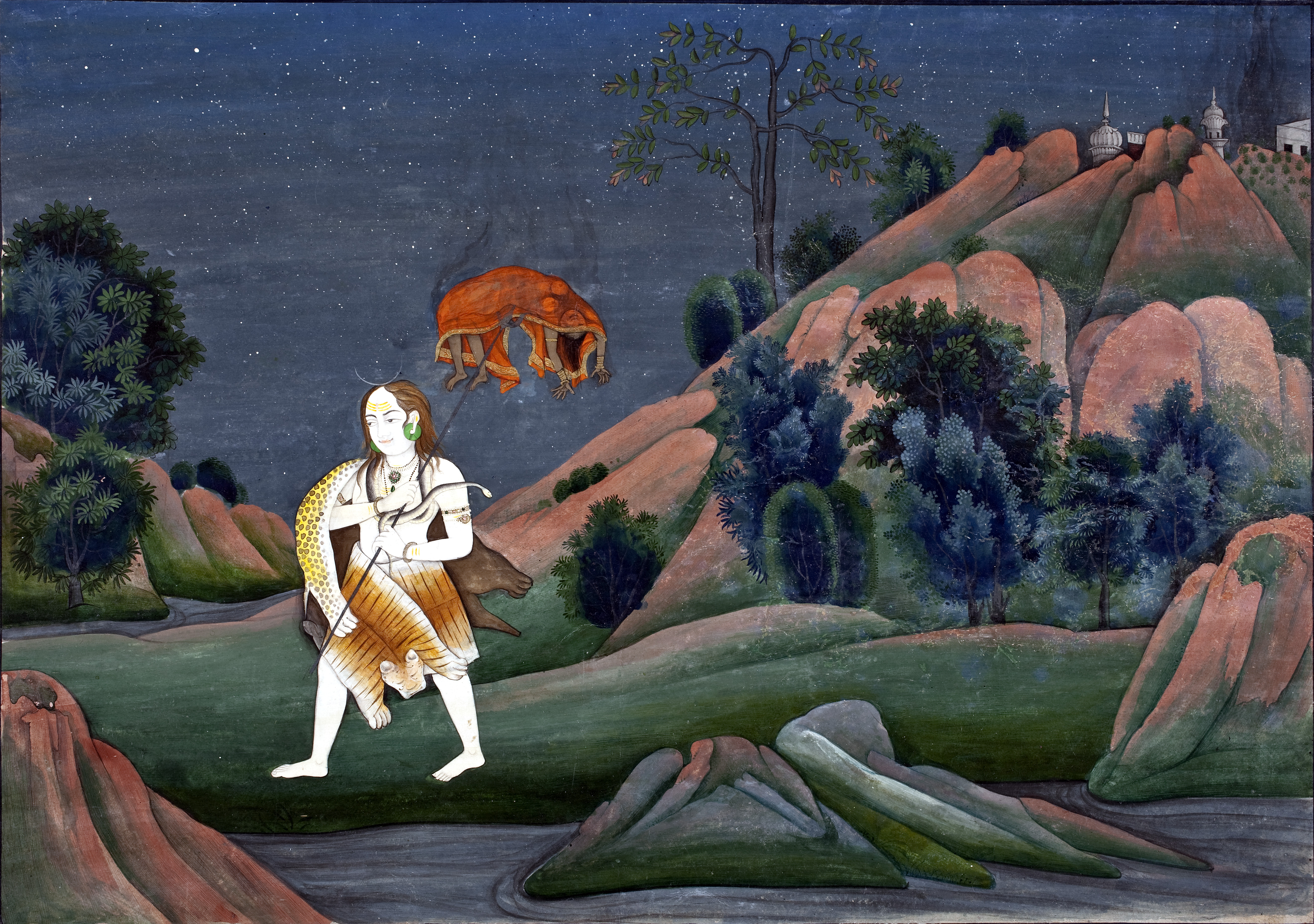
Shiva carrying the corpse of his consort Sati.

According to Hindu legend, when Sati Devi's father Daksha Prajapati was performing a yagya, he invited all the Gods except Mahadev to the ceremony. Sati went to her father's yagya ceremony and asked him why he had not invited her husband. Daksha Prajapati answered that Mahadev drank alcohol, smoked ganja, slept in cemeteries, wore a serpent around his neck, had dreadlocks, covered his body with ash, and wore tiger hide, hence he was unsuitable to attend such an important yagya. Unable to tolerate this insult to her husband, Sati jumped into the yagya fire and gave up her life.

Mahadev was so angered by her death that he sent Birbhadra and Bhoot gana to kill Daksha Prajapati and destroy the yagya. After exacting his vengeance, Mahadev started to mourn his wife. Mahadev traveled across the world carrying Sati's corpse. During this time, Vishnu released his Sudarshan chakra and wounded Sati's body so that it could be infested by insects and rot. As Sati's body started to disintegrate, the ground on which her body parts fell became Shakta pithas, places of worship. In this process, her left shoulder fell on the Mallagiri mountain. Mallagiri was then referred to as Malika.

The Divine Encounter of King Dipraj Chhatyal

In the ancient kingdom King Dipraj Chhatyal, a ruler of the Chhatyal dynasty, ruled over this sacred land. One day, King Dipraj Chhatyal, was on a hunting expedition around Mallaagiri Mountain which is currently known as Badimalika region, As he aimed to shoot a deer, an unseen force suddenly restrained his bow, preventing him from hunting. That night, Goddess Malika Devi appeared to him in a dream and spoke:

“O King, this land is sacred. You must not shed blood here. Instead, build a temple in my honor upon this holy mountain, where my divine presence shall bless your kingdom.”

Awakened by the divine revelation, King Dipraj Chhatyal abandoned his hunt and vowed to fulfill the goddess’s wish. Around the same time, Jumli Maharaj received a similar divine message, leading the two kings to collaborate on constructing the temple atop Mallaagiri Mountain, now known as Badimalika Temple.

The Sacred Construction

The temple’s construction was unique and symbolic. King Dipraj Chhatyal used black gram paste and stone, while Jumli Maharaj contributed copper plates for its foundation. As a mark of divine approval, Goddess Malika Devi began offering King Dipraj Chhatyal 84 varieties of food each day. However, his curiosity led him to observe the mystical woman delivering the food, whom he attempted to capture. The woman transformed into Malika Devi herself and cursed the king, declaring that neither he nor his descendants would ever meet her again.

The Connection Between Badimalika and Nateshwori

Filled with remorse, King Dipraj Chhatyal pleaded for forgiveness. In response, Goddess Badimalika instructed him to establish another temple in the Nateshwori forest, near his palace. She revealed that her elder sister, Goddess Devi Bhagawati, would be venerated at Nateshwori Temple. Devotees were required to worship at Nateshwori Temple, located in the same triveni municipality after paying homage at Badimalika, ensuring the fulfillment of their prayers.

== Communications ==
Telephone and the internet service have been extended to the Badimalika area Bajura District, a major religious and tourism destination, following the expansion of Nepal Telecom's 4G network to this remote region. The service came into the operation after a 4G mobile tower was installed in the area, ahead of the religious fair held at Badimalika on the occasion of Janai Purnima

Located at an elevation of approximately 4,200 metres (13,800 ft) above sea level, the Badimalika area previously had limited and unreliable telecommunications connectivity. The introduction of 4G services has improved access to mobile communication and internet connectivity for local residents, pilgrims, tourists and government and non-government organisations operating in the area. The service is also expected to facilitate communication and emergency coordination during the annual pilgrimage and religious activities.
