= Budhiganga =

Place in Sudurpashchim Province, Nepal

Budhiganga Municipality
- Location in Nepal
- Coordinates: 29.41°N 81.22°E
- Country: Nepal
- Province: Sudurpashchim
- District: Bajura
- Municipality: Budhiganga
- No.of wards: 10

Government
  - Mayor: Ram Bahadur Baniya
  - Deputy Mayor: Maya Khadka(Kunwar)

Area
  - Total: 59.2 km^{2} (22.9 sq mi)

Population (2017/18)
  - Total: 21,677
  - Religion: Hindu
- Time zone: UTC+5:45 (Nepal Time)
- Postal code: 10600
- Website: http://budhigangamunbajura.gov.np/

Budhiganga Municipality (Nepali: बुढीगंगा नगरपालिका) is the newly formed municipality in Bajura District in the Sudurpashchim Province of Nepal. It was formed in March, 2017 as decided by the Cabinet in line with the Constitution of Nepal 2015, recommended by the Local Bodies Restructuring Commission (LBRC).

== History ==
It is formed by merging previous 3 VDC named Kuldeumadau, Bahrabis and Bramhatola. The name of this is formed after the name of the river Budhiganga which separates this municipality from Triveni Municipality. There are some historic places which carry historical importance such as Barjukot Durbar, Kudikot Durbar and Bayalchaki Rajako Durbar. It is believed the name of Bajura District is derived from Barjukot Durbar.

== Geography & Population ==
The population of this municipality is 21,677. It is the biggest municipality in terms of population and smallest on the basis of area. The area of this municipality is (59.2 sq mi). It is the only municipality which has blacktopped road.

== Demographics ==
At the time of the 2011 Nepal census, Budhiganga Municipality had a population of 21,700. Of these, 99.9% spoke Nepali and 0.1% other languages as their first language.

In terms of ethnicity/caste, 48.4% were Chhetri, 11.5% Kami, 11.4% Hill Brahmin, 7.3% Damai/Dholi, 4.6% Lohar, 4.5% Thakuri, 4.5% Sarki, 2.4% Badi, 1.7% Sanyasi/Dasnami, 1.6% Kumal, 1.0% Teli, 0.4% Magar, 0.2% Bengali, 0.1% other Terai, 0.1% other Dalit and 0.3% others.

In terms of religion, 99.9% were Hindu and 0.1% Buddhist.

In terms of literacy, 60.0% could read and write, 1.8% could only read and 38.2% could neither read nor write.

== Education ==
Shree Bhanodaya Higher Secondary School which lies in Naubis of Bhudiganga Municipality established in 2024 B.S is one of the finest school to pursue higher education in this Municipality. Students from Triveni Municipality also used to travel long distance to pursue +2 level until few years back.

Badimalika Multiple Campus which runs bachelor's degree in BBS, B.Ed. and B.A. is newly established Campus in Naubis of Bajura District which attract students from Triveni & other municipalities.
