= Tolodewal =

Coordinates: 29°19′N 81°22′E

Tolidewal तोलीदेवल तोली
- Village development committee
- Interactive map of Tolidewal
- Country: Nepal
- Zone: Seti Zone
- District: Bajura District

Population (1991)
  - Total: 2,991
  - Religions: Hindu
- Time zone: UTC+5:45 (Nepal Time)

Tolidewal is a village in Bajura District in the Seti Zone of north-western Nepal. At the time of the 1991 Nepal census it had a population of 2,991 and had 599 houses in the village.
