= Resh Marhatta =

Nepalese actor and filmmaker

- रेश मराठा
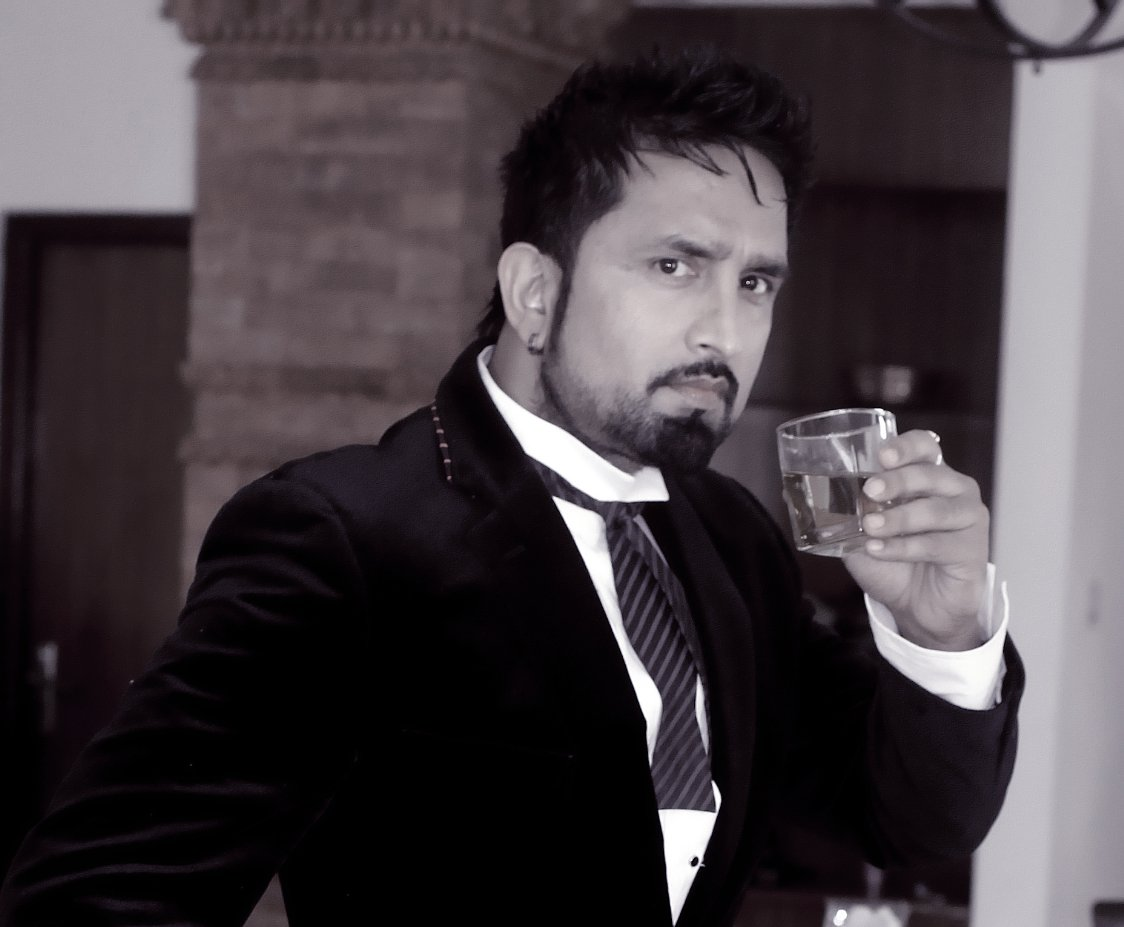
- Resh Marhatta posing for a food and wine magazine
- Occupation: Actor

Resh Marhatta (Nepali: / हिन्दी : रेश मराठा) is a Nepalese actor and filmmaker. Resh is also an author, columnist and a business educator. Resh has received a business teaching license from Utah State Board of Education. He is a graduate from Weber State University with high honor (Phi Kappa Phi Honor Society) He received a presidential scholarship and was included in Who’s Who Among American Universities and Colleges. He was elected as a Student Body Officer (Senator) in Weber State University. He made his acting debut with a supporting role in the Finish TV series called Junketeers directed by Timu during his California days back in 2001. He did his first modeling assignment with Artistic Imaging LLC, photographed by Jason Montgomery in Salt Lake City, Utah.

He works as a motivational speaker. He is frequently seen judging for beauty pageants and other reality shows in countries like Singapore, Bangladesh, Nepal, India, and Thailand. In 2015, he received the Asian Youth Icon award in Singapore, presented by Raja Gontar. On 30 May 2016, Marhatta received an honorary doctor of letters from Kings University.

Marhatta has written columns on health and fitness for the Nepalese magazines Vibes and Food & Wine. He has written three novels Roots (one of the untold stories of Asia), 11th Street (Romantic Thriller) and T2V, Trip to Vegas (Suspense Thriller). Trip to Vegas was released during an event in Baltimore in 2016.

== Family ==
Resh Marhatta belongs to family of Parashar Gotri Maratha immigrants into Gorkha Kingdom from Maharashtra, later moved to Jhamsikhel, Lalitpur then to the US. His father, Shakti Marhatta, was an economist in the Finance Ministry of Nepal, and his mother, Bina Marhatta, is a housewife. Resh is the youngest of six siblings. He went to MAV Boarding School in early days.

== Acting career ==
Resh Marhatta started acting career with Junkeeters (Finnish ) and Bollywood movie “Dus” starring Salman Khan, Sanjay Dutt directed by Late Mukal Anand but due to director's unexpected death, movie Dus did not release. His first two Nepalese films, Pinjada and Chahanchu Ma Timilainai, were commercially successful. After graduation, he has played some movies like “Kathmandu”, “Mission Paisa-Reloaded 2”, “Mero Best Friend”, “Acceptance”, “Mero Jiwan Sathi” etc. His short film Acceptance was screened at several international film festivals. Resh is seen in many TVCs, endorsements like Apartments and Housing, Insurance, Australian Wines, Tea, Biscuits, Clothing, Paints, Oil, etc.

Marhatta has appeared in several music videos, including "Yo prasanga" and "Pagalpan" by Yama Buddha, and "Pagal Paagal" by Salim Merchant. He is producing NATIONAL TREASURE, the blood run which is set to release worldwide. Production on his upcoming films, including Paranormal World and National Treasure, was delayed during the COVID-19 pandemic.

== Film ==
=== Filmography ===
Filmography
Year	Film	Role	Notes
1997	Junketeers	Supporting Role	Finland Release
1997	Dus	Supporting Role	Unreleased
2000	Pinjada	Lead Role	Super-Hit (over 100 days in Theatre)
2001	Chahanchu Ma Timilainai	Lead Role	Super-Hit (over 100 days in Theatre)
2010	Kathmandu	Lead Role	Average
2009	Acceptance	Lead Role	Film Festival
2012	Mero Jivan Saathi	Lead Role	Average
2014	Bhagi Bhagi Na Jau	Lead Role	Flop
2014	My Best Friend	Lead Role	Average
2014	Challenge	Lead Role	Unreleased
2015	Mission Paisa 2 - Reloaded (2015)	Lead Role	Average
2021	National Treasure	Producer/Lead Role	Pandemic Hold
2021	Paranormal Worlds	Special Appearance	Post-production
2021	11th Street	Producer/ Lead Role	Pandemic Hold

=== Upcoming films ===
Upcoming Films
Film	Role	Notes
Once in a blue Moon	Producer/Supporting Role	Pre-Production
Trip to Vegas	Producer	Pre-Production

== TVCs / endorsements ==
TVCs
Products	Directors
Siddhartha Insurance	Ravi Shrestha
Sai Kripa Tea	Dinesh Jung Rana
Karyavinayak Housing	Res Raj Acharya
Karyavinayak Colony phase 2	Res Raj Acharya
Jackpot Biscuits	Simous Sunuwar
Jasmin Paint	Jewan Thapa
Aygaz Heater	Prasan Poudel
Lumbini Bank	Kiran Marahatta
Aussie Wine	Sunil Shah
Tara / Sita Airlines	Saroj Oli

== Music videos ==
Music Video
Title	Artists
Pagalpan	Yama Buddha
Paagal Paagal	Salim Merchant
Yo Prasanga	Yama Buddha
Timro Mayako	Deepsikha Mishra
Birsana Sakdina	Muskaan Shrestha
Jiwan Yadi	Nisha Deshar
Jiwan Yadi	Nisha Deshar
Bhanu Nabhanu	Ajay Adhikari ft Nirnaya
Priya Timro	Smita Dahal
Na Sunaiko	Rukman Limbu

== Awards and recognitions ==
- Who’s Who Amongst American Colleges and Universities Excellence Award 1997-98, United States
- Asia Youth Icon by Raja Gotar 2015-2016, Singapore
- Honorary Doctorate, Kings University 2016, United States
- Grand Achievers 2016, USA
