= Swamikartik Rural Municipality =

Swamikartik Khapar (Nepali: स्वामिकार्तिक खापर गाउँपालिका 1) is a rural municipality in Bajura District in the Sudurpashchim Province of Nepal. It was formed in March 2017, in line with the Constitution of Nepal 2015. SwamiKartik khapar Rural Municipality has an area of 110.55 square kilometres (42.68 mi^{2}) and the population of this municipality is 13,013. It is the second biggest rural municipality in terms of population and smallest on the basis of area. It is divided into 5 wards and the headquarter of this newly formed municipality is situated at Wai. It is formed by merging previous VDCs named Sappata, Wai and Jukot.

== Demographics ==
At the time of the 2011 Nepal census, Swamikartik Khapar Rural Municipality had a population of 12,790. Of these, 100.0% spoke Nepali as their first language.

In terms of ethnicity/caste, 42.5% were Chhetri, 21.2% Kami, 15.2% Thakuri, 12.9% Hill Brahmin, 2.9% Damai/Dholi, 2.8% Sanyasi/Dasnami, 1.1% Lohar, 0.9% Sarki, 0.3% Kumal and 0.1% others.

In terms of religion, 100.0% were Hindu.

In terms of literacy, 51.4% could read and write, 2.7% could only read and 45.9% could neither read nor write.

Swamikartik khapar Rural Municipality स्वामिकार्तिक खापर गाउँपालिका
- Location in Nepal
- Coordinates: 29.48°N 81.75°E
- Country: Nepal
- Province: Sudurpashchim Province
- District: Bajura
- Rural Municipality: Swamikartikkhapar
- No.of wards: 5

Government
  - Type: Rural Council
  - Mayor: Bharat Bahadur Rokaya
  - Deputy Mayor: Maina Joshi

Area
  - Total: 110.55 km^{2} (42.68 sq mi)

Population (2022)
  - Total: 13,013
  - Density: 117.71/km^{2} (304.87/sq mi)
  - Religion: Hindu
- Time zone: UTC+5:45 (Nepal Time)
- Postal code: 10600
- Headquarter: Wai
- Website: https://swamikartikmun.gov.np/
