= Barhabise, Bajura =

Bahrabis बाह्रबिस
- Village development committee
- Location in Nepal
- Coordinates: 29.34°N 81.29°E
- Country: Nepal
- Province: Sudurpashchim Province
- District: Bajura District

Government

Population (1991)
  - Total: 5,543
  - Religions: Hindu
- Time zone: UTC+5:45 (Nepal Time)

Bahrabis is a village in Bajura District in Sudurpashchim Province of north-western Nepal. At the time of the 1991 Nepal census it had a population of 5,543 and had 1169 houses in the village.
