= Tolidewal =

- Village Development Committee
- Location in Nepal
- Coordinates: 29.31°N 81.35°E
- Country: Nepal
- Province: Sudurpashchim Province
- District: Bajura District

Tolidewal was a VDC in Bajura District, now part of Triveni Municipality of Sudurpashchim Province. At the time of 1991 Nepal census it had a population of 2,991 and had 599 houses in the village. Triveni Municipality office is also located here.

== History ==
Tolidewal was a VDC in Bajura District. Now this VDC is the part of Triveni Municipality. Previously it had 9 wards which are now merged into ward no 3, 4 and 5 of Triveni Municipality.

== Education ==
=== Higher secondary school ===
- Tolidewaldada Secondary School

=== Secondary school ===
- Rameshwori Secondary School
- Dhaulpuri Secondary School

=== Lower secondary school ===
- Bhageswori Secondary School
- Dhaulpuri Secondary School

=== Primary school ===
- Janajyoti Primary School
- Triveni Primary School
- Masteshwori Primary School
