= Bajura Airport =

Airport in Nepal

Bajura Airport बाजुरा विमानस्थल
- IATA: BJU; ICAO: VNBR

Summary
- Airport type: Public
- Owner: Government of Nepal
- Operator: Civil Aviation Authority of Nepal
- Serves: Bajura, Nepal
- Location: Budhinanda, Nepal
- Opened: 1 October 1984
- Elevation AMSL: 4,300 ft / 1,311 m
- Coordinates: 29°30′N 81°40′E

Map
- Location of airport in Nepal

Runways
| Direction | Length | | Surface |
| Direction | m | ft | Surface |
|---|---|---|---|
| 09/27 | 520 | 1,880 | Asphalt |

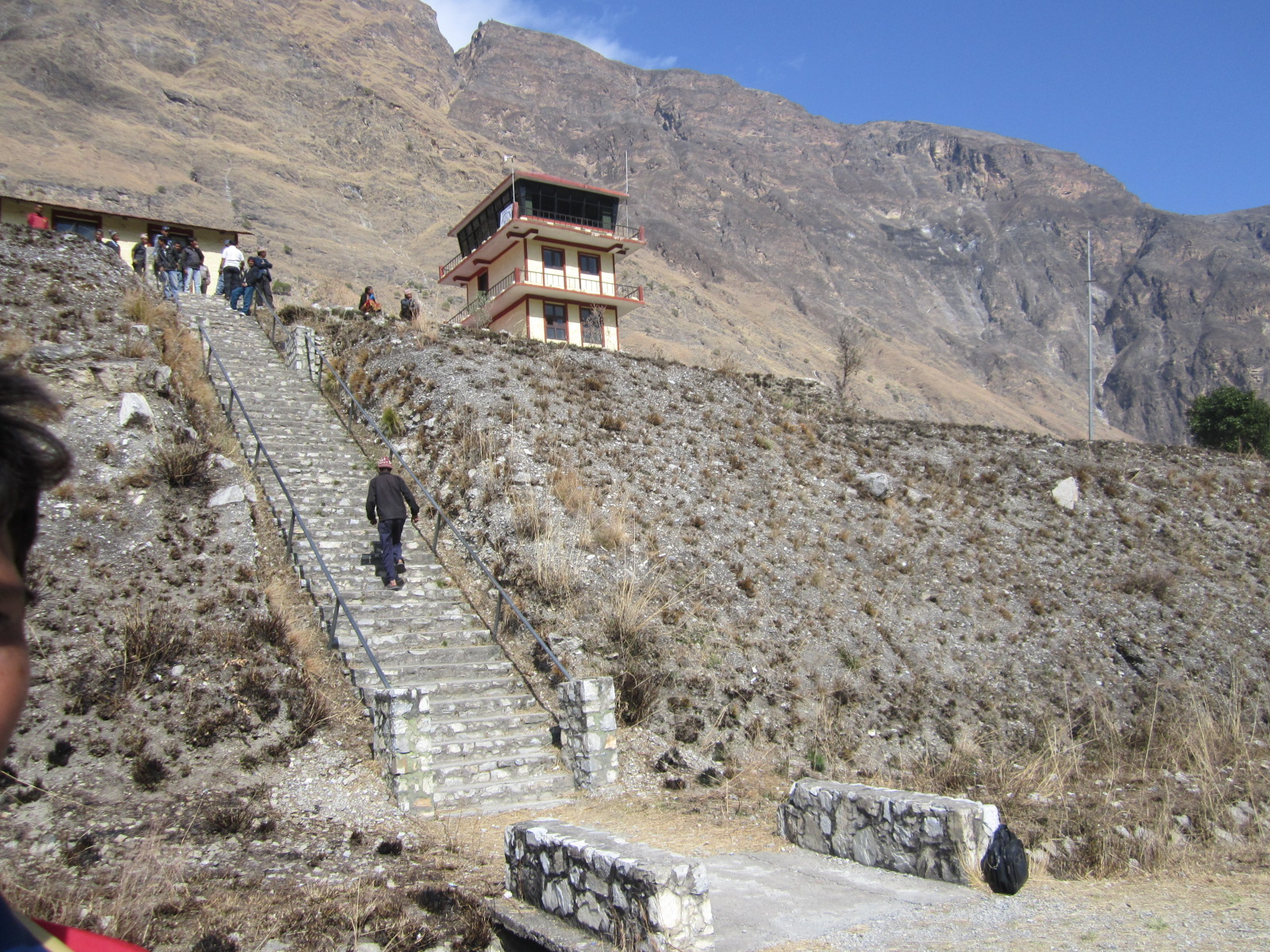
Ariplane tower of bajura

Bajura Airport (IATA: BJU, ICAO: VNBR) is a domestic airport located in Budhinanda serving Bajura District, a district in Sudurpashchim Province in Nepal.

== Facilities ==
The airport resides at an elevation of 4,300 feet (1,311 m) above mean sea level. It has one runway which is 520 metres (1,706 ft) in length.

== Airlines and destinations ==
| Airlines | Destinations |
|---|---|
| Nepal Airlines | Dhangadhi, Nepalgunj |
| Sita Air | Nepalgunj |
| Summit Air | Birendranagar, Nepalgunj |
| Tara Air | Nepalgunj |

== Incidents and accidents ==
- On 30 May 2017, a Nepalese Army Air Service PZL M28 Skytruck crashed at Bajura Airport while its pilot was trying to land the aircraft. The cargo airplane was supposed to land at Simikot Airport in Humla district. However, bad weather condition forced the pilot to divert towards Bajura. The pilot of the aircraft died while two others were injured.

== See also ==
- List of airports in Nepal
- Kolti
- Budhinanda
