= Wai, Nepal =

Wai
- VDC
- Location in Nepal
- Coordinates: 29.48°N 81.75°E
- Country: Nepal
- Province: Sudurpashchim Province
- District: Bajura District

Wai used to be a VDC in Bajura District. Now it is the part of Swamikartik Rural Municipality of Sudurpashchim Province, Nepal.

Previously this VDC had ward no. 1 to 9. Now all these ward have been merged and formed ward no. 4 and 5 of Swamikartik Rural Municipality. People residing here belongs to Chhetri, Kami, Brahmin, Damai, Sarki, Limbu etc. It is one of the remote place of Bajura District.
