= Jukot =

- Village Development Committee
- Location in Nepal
- Coordinates: 29.45°N 81.75°E
- Country: Nepal
- Province: Sudurpashchim Province
- District: Bajura District

Jukot used to be a VDC in Bajura District. Now it is the part of Swamikartik Rural Municipality of Sudurpashchim Province, Nepal. Now Jukot VDC is ward no. 3 of Swamikartik Rural Municipality. This VDC has 597 households with a total population of 3,230 of which 1,617 are female and 1,613 are male. People residing here belong to Chhetri, Kami, Brahmin, Damai, Sarki, Limbu etc. Politically, the Dalit population have been dominated by the Thakuris. It is one of the remote place of Bajura District.

The village is known for its apple farms.
