= Kolti =

Kolti कोल्टी
- Village development committee
- Location in Nepal
- Coordinates: 29.548°N 81.625°E
- Country: Nepal
- Zone: Seti Zone
- District: Bajura District

Population (1991)
  - Total: 4,530
  - Religions: Hindu
- Time zone: UTC+5:45 (Nepal Time)

Kolti is a village in Bajura District in the Seti Zone of north-western Nepal. At the time of the 1991 Nepal census it had a population of 4,530 and had 850 houses in the village.

The Kolti Village Development Committee name has been changed to Budhinandha Municipality as per the new Federal Republic of Nepal constitution. Mr. Padam Kumar Giri of the Nepali Congress Party was elected as Mayor of Budhinandha Municipality in 2018.

== See also ==
- Bajura Airport
- Himali Rural Municipality
- Budhinanda
