= Kotila, Bajura =

Kotila, Seti कोटिला
- Village development committee
- Location in Nepal
- Coordinates: 29.49°N 81.66°E
- Country: Nepal
- Zone: Seti Zone
- District: Bajura District

Population (1991)
  - Total: 2,347
  - Religions: Hindu
- Time zone: UTC+5:45 (Nepal Time)

Kotila is a village in Bajura District in the Seti Zone of north-western Nepal. At the time of the 1991 Nepal census it had a population of 2,347 and had 451 houses in the village.
