= Kuldeumadau =

Kuldeumandau कुलदेउमाडौं
- Village development committee
- Location in Nepal
- Coordinates: 29.37°N 81.34°E
- Country: Nepal
- Zone: Seti Zone
- District: Bajura District

Population (1991)
  - Total: 4,776
  - Religions: Hindu
- Time zone: UTC+5:45 (Nepal Time)

Kuldeumandau is a village in Bajura District in the Seti Zone of north-western Nepal. At the time of the 1991 Nepal census it had a population of 4,776 and had 969 houses in the village.
