= Dahakot =

Village development committee in Seti Zone, Nepal

Dahakot दहकोट
- Village development committee
- Location in Nepal
- Coordinates: 29.58°N 81.48°E
- Country: Nepal
- Zone: Seti Zone
- District: Bajura District

Population (1991)
  - Total: 3,312
  - Religions: Hindu
- Time zone: UTC+5:45 (Nepal Time)

Dahakot is a village in Bajura District in the Seti Zone of north-western Nepal. At the time of the 1991 Nepal census it had a population of 3,312 and had 569 houses in the village.
