= Bichhiya =

Coordinates: 29°39′N 81°41′E

Bichhiya बिच्छिया
- Village development committee
- Interactive map of Bichhiya
- Country: Nepal
- Zone: Seti Zone
- District: Bajura District

Population (1991)
  - Total: 1,904
  - Religions: Hindu
- Time zone: UTC+5:45 (Nepal Time)

Bichhiya is a village in Bajura District in the Seti Zone of north-western Nepal. At the time of the 1991 Nepal census it had a population of 1,904 and had 352 houses in the village.
