= Dogadi =

Village development committee in Seti Zone, Nepal

Dogadi दोगडी
- Village development committee
- Location in Nepal
- Coordinates: 29.43°N 81.28°E
- Country: Nepal
- Zone: Seti Zone
- District: Bajura District

Population (1991)
  - Total: 2,797
  - Religions: Hindu
- Time zone: UTC+5:45 (Nepal Time)

Dogadi is a village in Bajura District in the Seti Zone of north-western Nepal. At the time of the 1991 Nepal census it had a population of 2,797 and had 511 houses in the village.
