= Jayabageshwari =

Jayabageshwari जयबागेश्वरी
- Village development committee
- Location in Nepal
- Coordinates: 29.38°N 81.26°E
- Country: Nepal
- Zone: Seti Zone
- District: Bajura District

Population (1991)
  - Total: 1,782
  - Religions: Hindu
- Time zone: UTC+5:45 (Nepal Time)

Jayabageshwari is a village in Bajura District in the Seti Zone of north-western Nepal. At the time of the 1991 Nepal census it had a population of 1,782 and had 332 houses in the village.
