= Sappata =

Coordinates: 29°26′N 81°43′E

Sappata सपाटा
- Village development committee
- Interactive map of Sappata
- Country: Nepal
- Zone: Seti Zone
- District: Bajura District

Population (1991)
  - Total: 3,788
  - Religions: Hindu
- Time zone: UTC+5:45 (Nepal Time)

Sappata is a village in Bajura District in the Seti Zone of north-western Nepal. At the time of the 1991 Nepal census it had a population of 3,788 and had 662 houses in the village.
