= Chhatara, Achham =

Chhatara छतरा
- Village development committee
- Location in Nepal
- Coordinates: 29.31°N 81.36°E
- Country: Nepal
- Zone: Seti Zone
- District: Achham District

Population (1991)
  - Total: 2,642
  - Religions: Hindu
- Time zone: UTC+5:45 (Nepal Time)

Chhatara is a village in the Achham District in the Seti Zone of western Nepal. At the time of the 1991 Nepal census, the village had a population of 2642 living in 522 houses. There is no population information available for the 2001 Nepal census.
