= Rugin =

Rugin रुगिन
- Village development committee
- Location in Nepal
- Coordinates: 29.59°N 81.72°E
- Country: Nepal
- Zone: Seti Zone
- District: Bajura District

Population (1991)
  - Total: 2,105
  - Religions: Hindu
- Time zone: UTC+5:45 (Nepal Time)

Rugin is a village in Bajura District of the Seti Zone in northwestern Nepal. As of 1991, it has 2,105 people and 399 houses.
