= Bramhatola =

Village development committee in Seti Zone, Nepal

Bramhatola ब्रह्मटोल
- Village development committee
- Location in Nepal
- Coordinates: 29.40°N 81.37°E
- Country: Nepal
- Zone: Seti Zone
- District: Bajura District

Population (1991)
  - Total: 4,855
  - Religions: Hindu
- Time zone: UTC+5:45 (Nepal Time)

Bramhatola is a village in Bajura District in the Seti Zone of north-western Nepal. At the time of the 1991 Nepal census it had a population of 4,855 and had 1011 houses in the village.
