= Kailashmandau =

Kailashmandau कैलाशमाडौं
- Village development committee
- Location in Nepal
- Coordinates: 29.35°N 81.39°E
- Country: Nepal
- Province: Sudurpashchim Province
- District: Bajura District

Population (2011)
  - Total: 9,586
  - Religions: Hindu
- Time zone: UTC+5:45 (Nepal Time)

Kailashmandau used to be VDC in Bajura District in the Seti Zone of north-western Nepal. At the time of the 2011 Nepal census it had a population of 9,586 and had 1818 houses. There is a small market and it is also the junction to many villages of this region.

== History ==
Previously this VDC had 9 wards which are now all part of Triveni Municipality. Previous ward no. 1 to 9 are now converted into ward no. 6 to 9. This place is locally known as Danda डाँडा.

== Demography ==
People living here belongs to Chhetri, Brahmin, Damai, Kami, and Sarki.

== Temple and Religious Place ==
- Nateshwori Temple
- Maure Chhetra

== Occupation ==
Agriculture is the main occupation of the people here.

== Road & Transport ==
It is connected by Maure- Kailashmandu road section, which further extends till Pandara ward no. 6 of Triveni Municipality.

== Education ==
The number of schools have increased over the year. Education level and teaching techniques are still traditional. Masteshwori Higher Secondary School and Ratna Higher Secondary School have computer and wifi facility too. These higher secondary schools provide +2 level programs in Humanities and Education.

=== Higher Secondary Schools ===
- Masteshwori Higher Secondary School
- Ratna Higher Secondary School

=== Secondary school ===
- Parwati Secondary School
- Kailaseswori Secondary School

=== Lower Secondary School ===
- Nateshwori Secondary School
- Narsingh Secondary School

=== Primary schools ===
- Nitteshwori Primary School
- Bajura Model Academy
