= Kanda, Bajura =

Coordinates: 29°24′N 81°14′E

Kanda, Bajura काण्ड
- Village development committee
- Interactive map of Kanda, Bajura
- Country: Nepal
- Zone: Seti Zone
- District: Bajura District

Population (1991)
  - Total: 2,741
  - Religions: Hindu
- Time zone: UTC+5:45 (Nepal Time)

Kanda, Bajura is a village in Bajura District in the Seti Zone of north-western Nepal. At the time of the 1991 Nepal census it had a population of 2,741 and had 484 houses in the village.

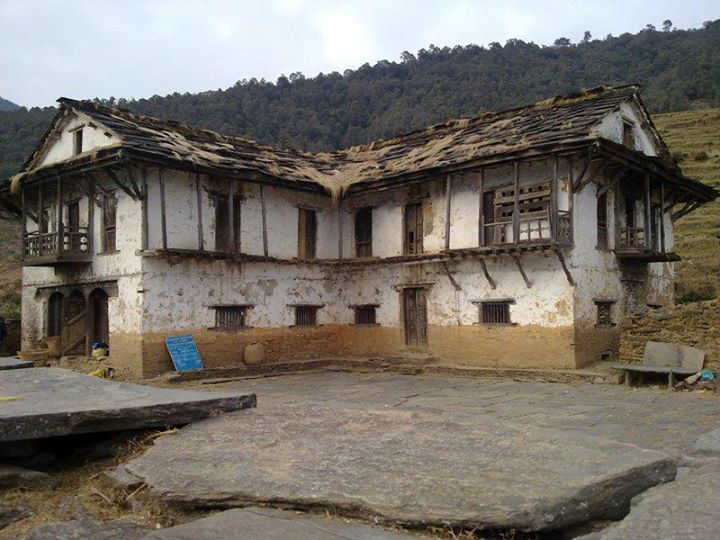
Bajura's Historical place Kada Darbar
