= Chhatara, Bajura =

Chhatara, Bajura छतरा
- Village development committee
- Location in Nepal
- Coordinates: 29.30°N 81.36°E
- Country: Nepal
- Zone: Seti Zone
- District: Bajura District

Population
  - Religions: Hindu
- Time zone: UTC+5:45 (Nepal Time)

Chhatara is a village in Bajura District in the Seti Zone of north-western Nepal, It lies in Ward No. 1 of Triveni Municipality.
