= Baddhu =

Bandhu बाँधु
- Village development committee
- Location in Nepal
- Coordinates: 29.53°N 81.73°E
- Country: Nepal
- Zone: Seti Zone
- District: Bajura District

Population (1991)
  - Total: 3,778
  - Religions: Hindu
- Time zone: UTC+5:45 (Nepal Time)

Bandhu is a village development committee in Bajura District in the Seti Zone of north-western Nepal. At the time of the 1991 Nepal census it had a population of 3,778 and had 748 houses in the village.
