= Martadi =

Martadi मार्तडी
- Village development committee
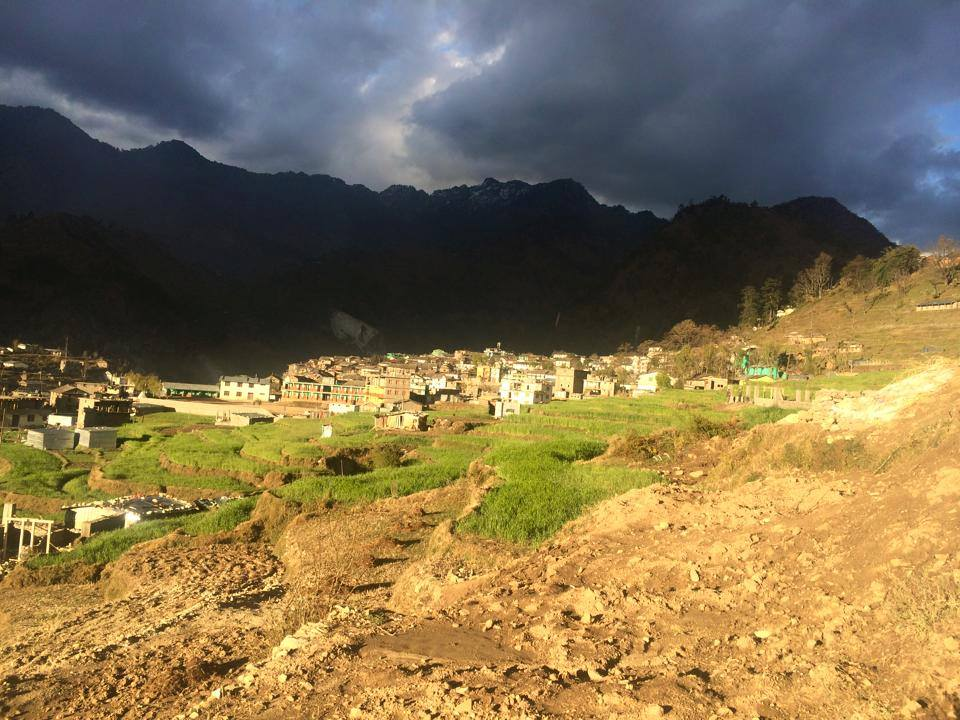
- Martadi at Glance

- Location in Nepal
- Coordinates: 29.258°N 81.224°E
- Country: Nepal
- Province: Sudurpaschim
- Zone: Seti
- District: Bajura
- Elevation: 2,030 m (6,660 ft)

Population (2011)
  - Total: 8,807
  - Religions: Hindu
- Time zone: UTC+5:45 (Nepal Time)
- Postal code: 10600
- Area code: 097
- Website: https://www.badimalikamun.gov.np

Martadi is a town and seat of Bajura District Coordination Committee. It is also the headquarters of the Badi Malika Municipality. At the time of the 1991 Nepal census it had a population of 4,618 and had 942 houses in the town but now it has increased by growth rate of 2.62 and reached 8807.

The town and surrounding area is under the jurisdiction of the Martadi District Police.

== Population ==
At the time of the 2011 Nepal census it had a population of 8,807 (4,101 Female and 4,706 Male) people living in 1,290 individual Households.

== Colleges and schools in Martadi ==
- Bajura Multiple Campus

It has been conditioning the bachelor level programs with affiliation to Tribhuwan University, Kirtipur, Kathmandu, Nepal.

- Badimalika English Boarding School
- Converse Academy
- Shree Malika Higher Secondary School

== Gallery ==
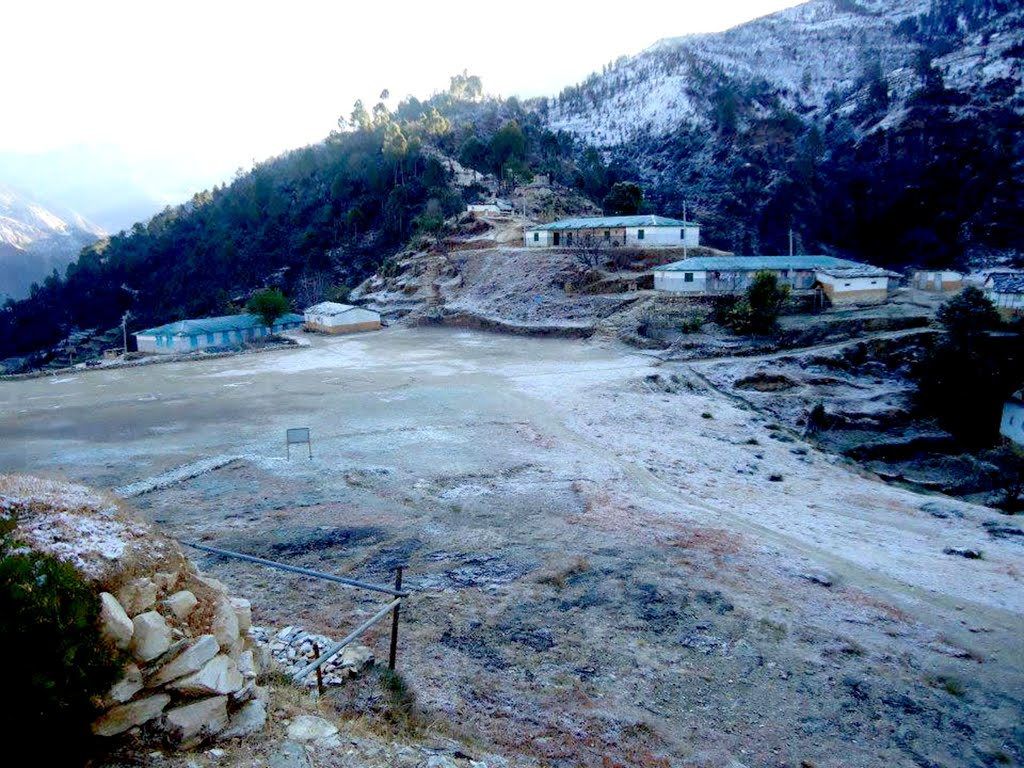
View of Army Camp

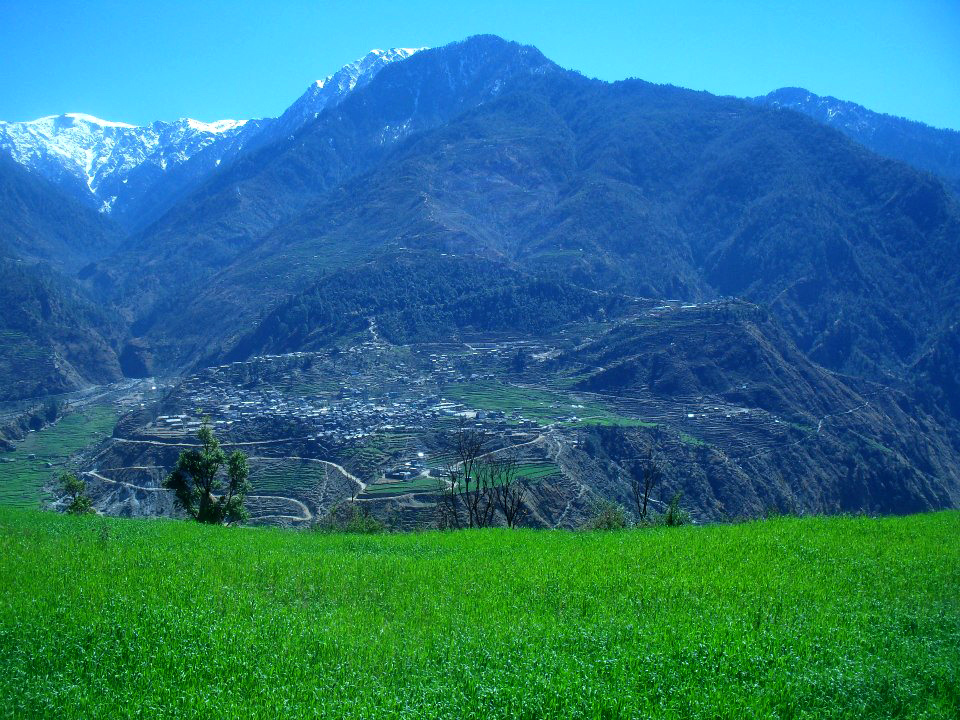
view of Martadi from Khapalta

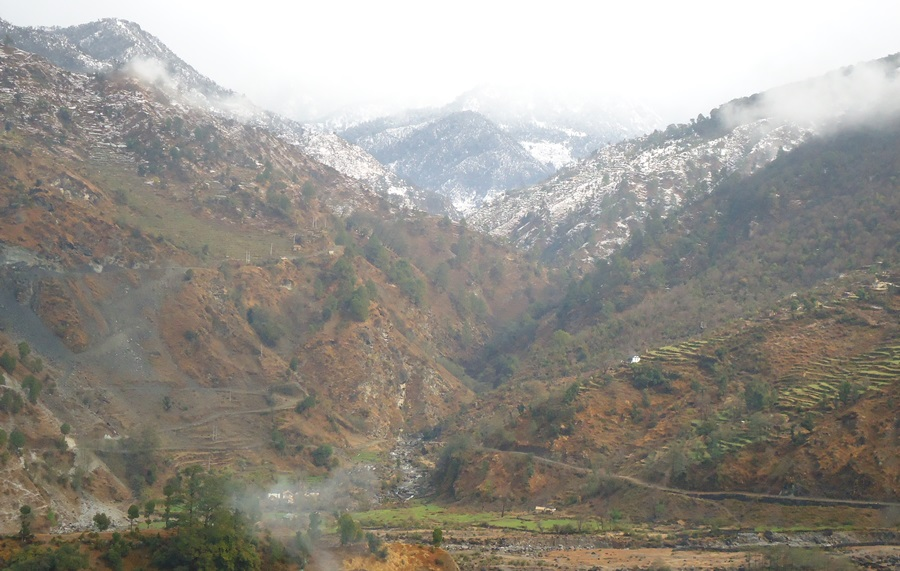
view of mountain from Martadi Bajar
