= Bajura District =

Bajura District बाजुरा
- District
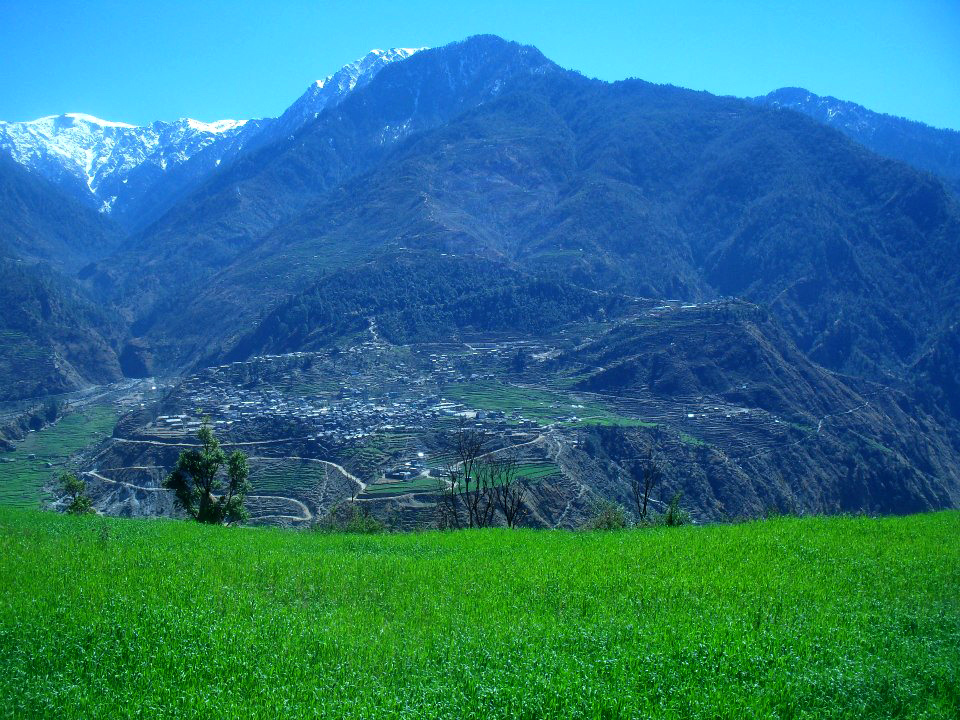

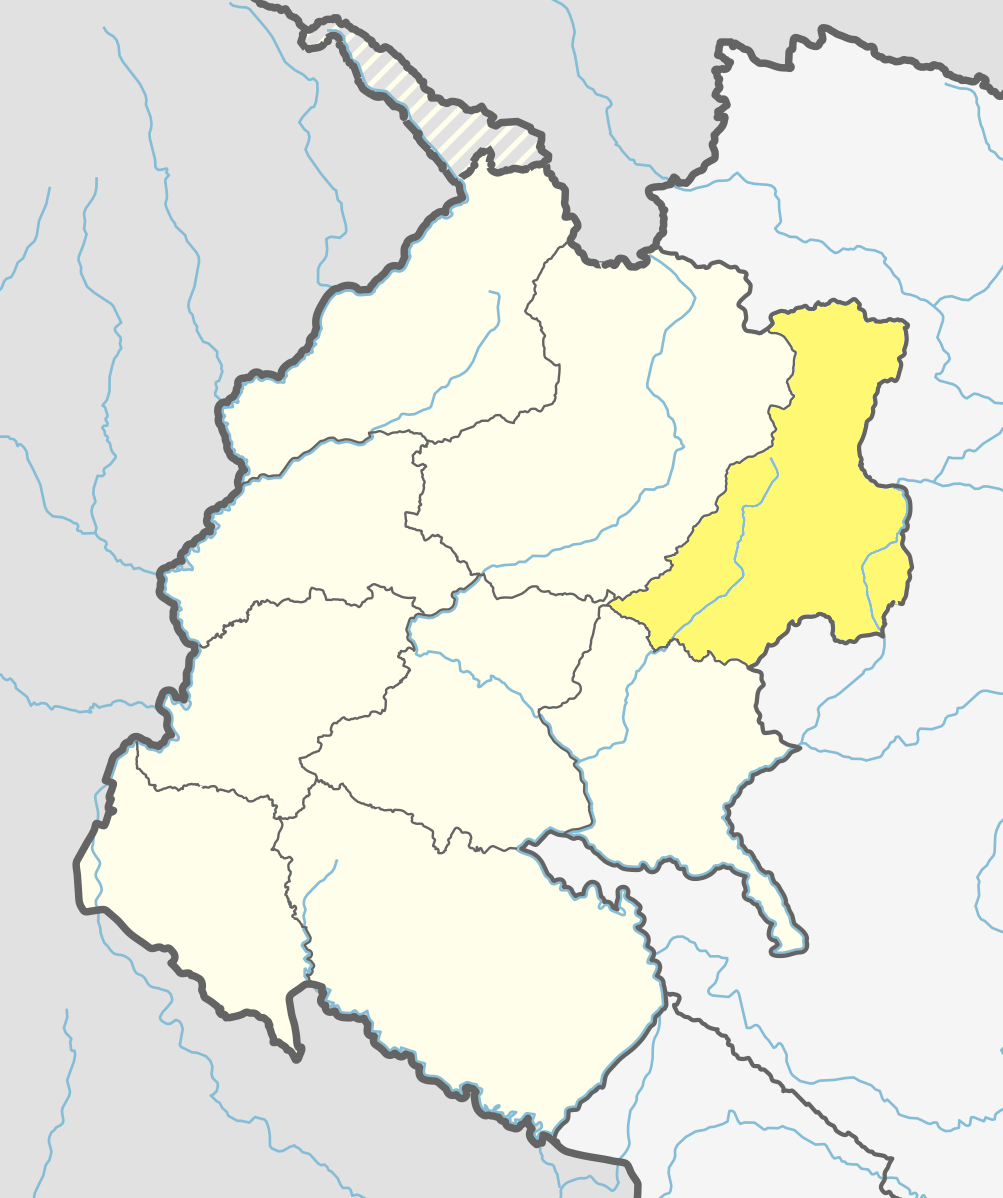
- Location of Bajura District
- Coordinates: 29°26′49″N 81°29′12″E
- Country: Nepal
- Province: Sudurpashchim Province
- Admin HQ.: Martadi (today part of Badimalika municipality)

Government
  - Type: Coordination committee
  - Body: DCC, Bajura

Area
  - Total: 2,188 km^{2} (845 sq mi)
- Elevation: 6,400 m (21,000 ft)

Population (2011)
  - Total: 134,912
  - Density: 61.66/km^{2} (159.7/sq mi)
- Time zone: UTC+05:45 (NPT)
- Postal Codes: 10600
- Telephone Code: 097
- Main Language(s): Nepali
- Website: www.ddcbajura.gov.np

Bajura District (Nepali: बाजुरा जिल्ला), a part of Sudurpashchim Province, is one of the seventy-seven districts of Nepal. The district, with Martadi (today part of Badimalika municipality) as its district headquarters, covers an area of 2,188 km^{2} (845 sq mi) and had a population of 108,781 in 2001 and 134,912 in 2011.

The annual rainfall is about 13,433 mm and temperatures vary from 0 °C to 40 °C. The livelihood of more than 80% of the district population depends on agriculture farming, mainly small scale livestock. Due to low level of agricultural production, the majority of the households face acute food shortages for a large part of the year. According to the National Census 2011, the total population of the district is 134,912 comprising 69,106 female (51%) and 65,806 male (49%) residing in 24,908 households. Bajura district has an average population density of around 62 people per square km. The average family size is 5.4. Life expectancy of the people is 58 years. The average literacy rate is about 32%. Bajura district has a multi ethnic composition with Chhetri, Kami, Thakuri, Brahman, Damai, SarkI and Sanyashi (Giri and Puri). The common language is Nepali (96%) followed by Bhote Sherpa (0.46%) and Tamang (0.42%). Although accessibility to Bajura is very poor, this is improving rapidly. The Government strategy is mainly focused on the connection of VDC headquarters with all-weather motor able roads to SRN or District headquarters. Moreover, the DDC body of Bajura district has given higher priority on rural roads.

== Geography and Climate ==
The district has nine municipalities, 9 Ilakas (administrative areas) and 1 constituency areas. The district is situated in Longitude between 81° 10′ 20″ to 81° 48′ 27″ East and Latitude 29° 16′ 21″ to 29° 56′ 56″ North. Geographically the district is divided in three distinct regions from north to south viz. Higher Himalayan Region, Higher Mountain and mid – Mountains. The Higher Himalayan region comprises Saipal Himalayan range; High Mountain region comprises Doha Lekh and Ghori Lekh. Similarly, Mid-Mountain range comprises different ranges of mountains e.g. Badimalika Temple. The District has started from 300m to 6400m in height.

Climate Zone	Elevation Range	% of Area
Upper Tropical	300 to 1,000 meters 1,000 to 3,300 ft.	0.6%
Subtropical	1,000 to 2,000 meters 3,300 to 6,600 ft.	19.7%
Temperate	2,000 to 3,000 meters 6,400 to 9,800 ft.	36.4%
Subalpine	3,000 to 4,000 meters 9,800 to 13,100 ft.	25.2%
Alpine	4,000 to 5,000 meters 13,100 to 16,400 ft.	11.2%
Nival	above 5,000 meters	6.4%
Trans-Himalayan	3,000 to 6,400 meters 9,800 to 21,000 ft.	0.5%

== Demographics ==
Historical population
Census year	Pop.	±% p.a.
1981	74,649	—
1991	92,010	+2.11%
2001	108,781	+1.69%
2011	134,912	+2.18%
2021	138,998	+0.30%
Source: Citypopulation

At the time of the 2021 Nepal census, Bajura District had a population of 138,523. 10.56% of the population is under 5 years of age. It has a literacy rate of 71.24% and a sex ratio of 1065 females per 1000 males. 76,469 (55.20%) lived in municipalities.

Castes/ethnic groups in Bajura district (2021)
1. Chhetri (59.5%)
2. Kami (16.2%)
3. Bahun (6.02%)
4. Damai (5.49%)
5. Thakuri (4.99%)
6. Sarki (4.62%)
7. Dasnami (1.44%)
8. Hill Janjati (1.50%)
9. Others (0.28%)

Khas people make up a majority of the population with 98% of the population. Chhetris make up 59% of the population, while Khas Dalits make up 26% of the population. Hill Janjatis, mainly Bhote, are 1% of the population who live in the high mountains.

Languages of Bajura district (2021)
1. Nepali (63.9%)
2. Bajureli (34.0%)
3. Others (2.10%)

At the time of the 2021 census, 63.93% of the population spoke Nepali and 33.97% Bajureli as their first language. The people of this district speak the Bajureli dialect. In 2011, 99.2% of the population spoke Nepali as their first language.

Religion in Bajura District (2021)
Religion	Percent
Hinduism	98.72%
Buddhism	1.14%
Other or not stated	0.14%

== Administration ==
The district consists of nine municipalities, out of which four are urban municipalities and five are rural municipalities. These are as follows:

- Badimalika Municipality
- Triveni Municipality
- Budhiganga Municipality
- Budhinanda Municipality
- Gaumul Rural Municipality
- Jagnnath Rural Municipality
- Swamikartik Khapar Rural Municipality
- Khaptad Chhededaha Rural Municipality
- Himali Rural Municipality

=== Former Village Development Committees ===
Prior to the restructuring of the district, Bajura District consisted of the following Village development committees:

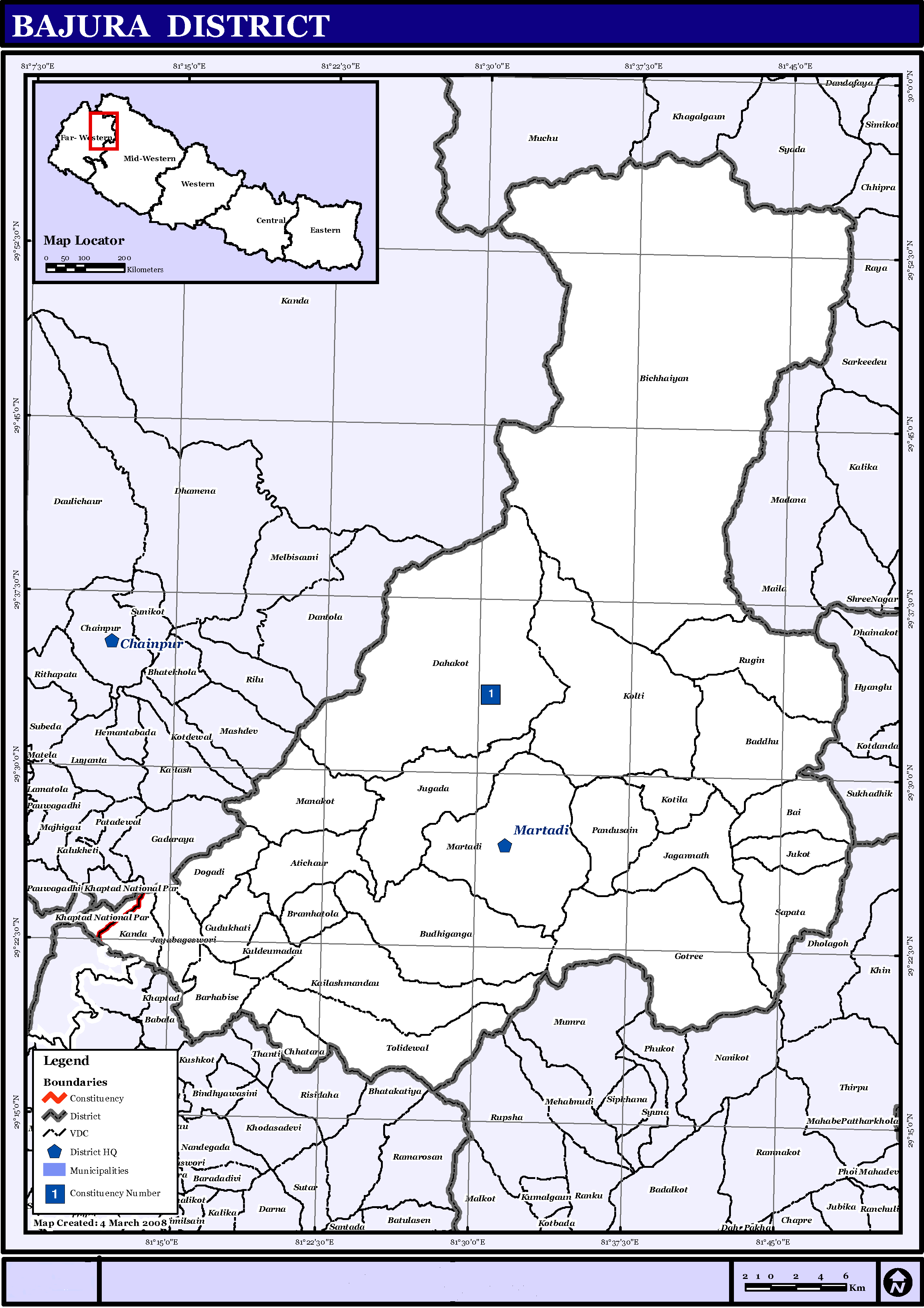
Map of the VDC/s in Bajura District

- Atichaur
- Baddhu
- Bahrabis
- Bichhiya
- Bramhatola
- Budhiganga
- Chhatara
- Dahakot
- Dogadi
- Gotri
- Gudukhati
- Jagannath
- Jayabageshwari
- Jugada
- Kailashmandau
- Kanda
- Kolti
- Kotila
- Kuldeumadau
- Manakot
- Martadi
- Pandusain
- Rugin
- Sappata
- Tolidewal
- Wai
- Jukot

== Health care ==
The small health centres in many VDCs are without Auxiliary Health Workers (AHWs), Auxiliary Nurse Midwives (ANMs) and Community Health Workers (CHWs). Primary or normal treatment can be done in the district headquarters and also in Bayalpata Hospital of neighbouring district Accham while people seeking severe cases have to travel a long distance to Kathmandu or other major cities or end up dying because of lack of treatment. Many people still believe in Dhami and Jhakri and do not always seek medical or go to the hospital for treatment. An NGO, PHASE Nepal provides many health care facilities and training programs to six VDCs: Kolti, Wai, Kotila, Pandusain, Rugin and Bandhu. Many people residing in these VDCs have benefited from the program.

Currently PHASE Nepal is working on several projects in this district including community health and education, livelihood, hygiene, sanitation and diarrhoea mitigation programmes. PHASE Nepal also conduct education programs like teacher training and girls empowerment programme.

== Colleges and School in Bajura ==
Martadi, Bajura

- Bajura Multiple Campus

It is a constituent campus of Far Western University, Nepal and has been conditioning the bachelor level and Masters Level programs Under the faculty of Humanities & Social Sciences, Education and Management

- Badimalika English Boarding School
- Shree Mosteshwori Lower Secondary School Chaurata
- Converse Academy
- Shree Malika Higher Secondary School
- Creator Zone Academy

Kolti, Bajura

- Shree Jana Prakash Higher Secondary School

Naubis, Bajura

- Shree Bhanodaya higher Secondary School
- Badimalika Multiple Campus

It is a constituent campus of Far Western University and It is conducting the Bachelor's level program BBS, BEd & B.A. Triveni, Bajura

- Ratna Higher Secondary School, Seliphal, Bajura.

It was established in 2022 BS, it recently started offering +2 level program in Humanities and Education stream.

- Masteshwori Higher Secondary School, Pandhara, Bajura.

The school is providing plus two level program in Humanities and Education stream.

- Tolidewal Danda Secondary School, Toli, Bajura.
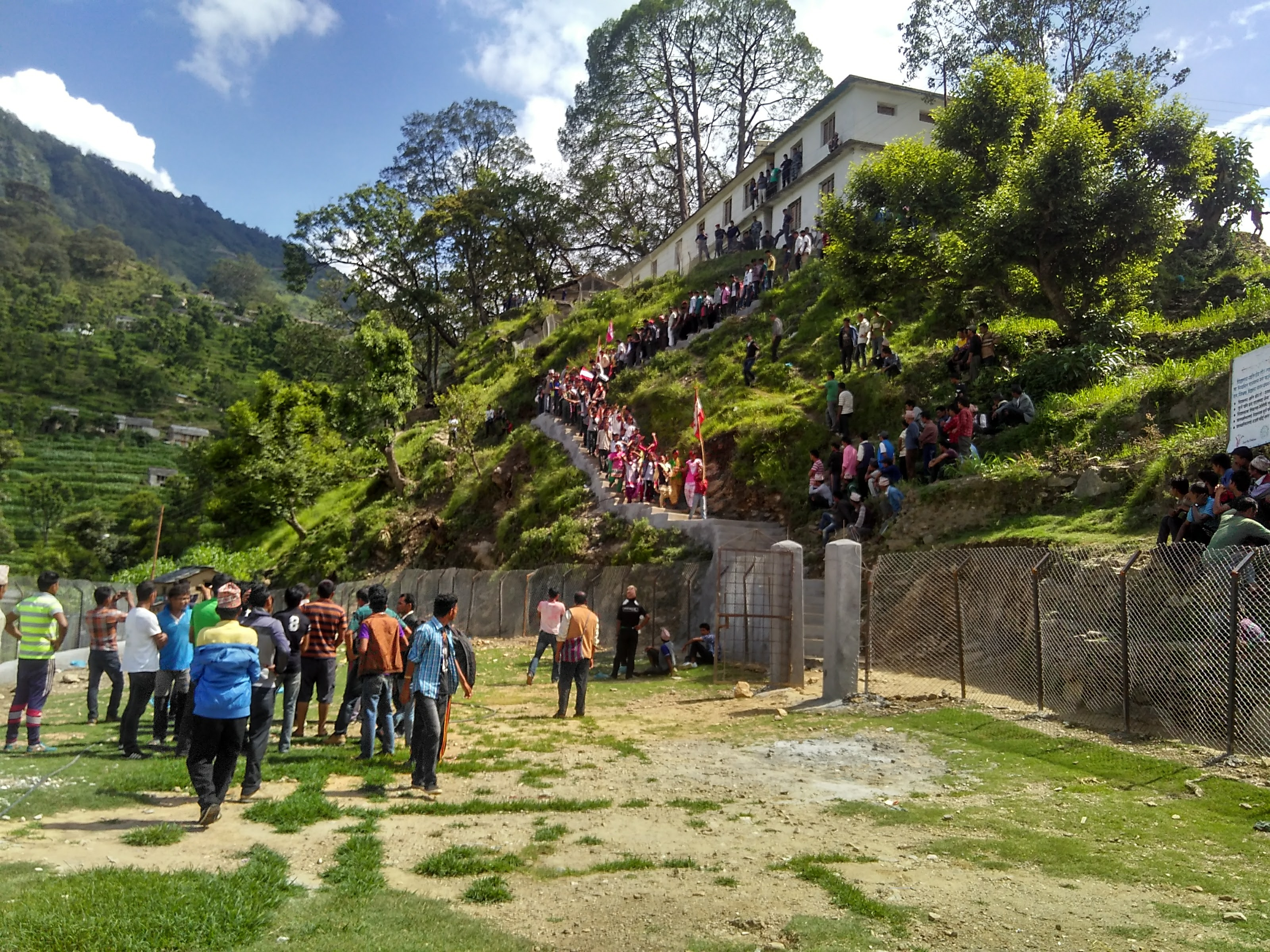
  Tolidewal School

The school is providing plus two level program in Humanities and Education stream.

- Tribhuwaneshwari Secondary School, Chhatara, Bajura.

The school is providing plus two level program in Management and Education stream.

- Shree Parvati Secondary School, Paima, Bajura
- Nateshwori Secondary School, Khripata, Bajura
- Damtha Secondary School, Kailashmandu Bajura
- Bajura Model Academy, Khirpata Bajura

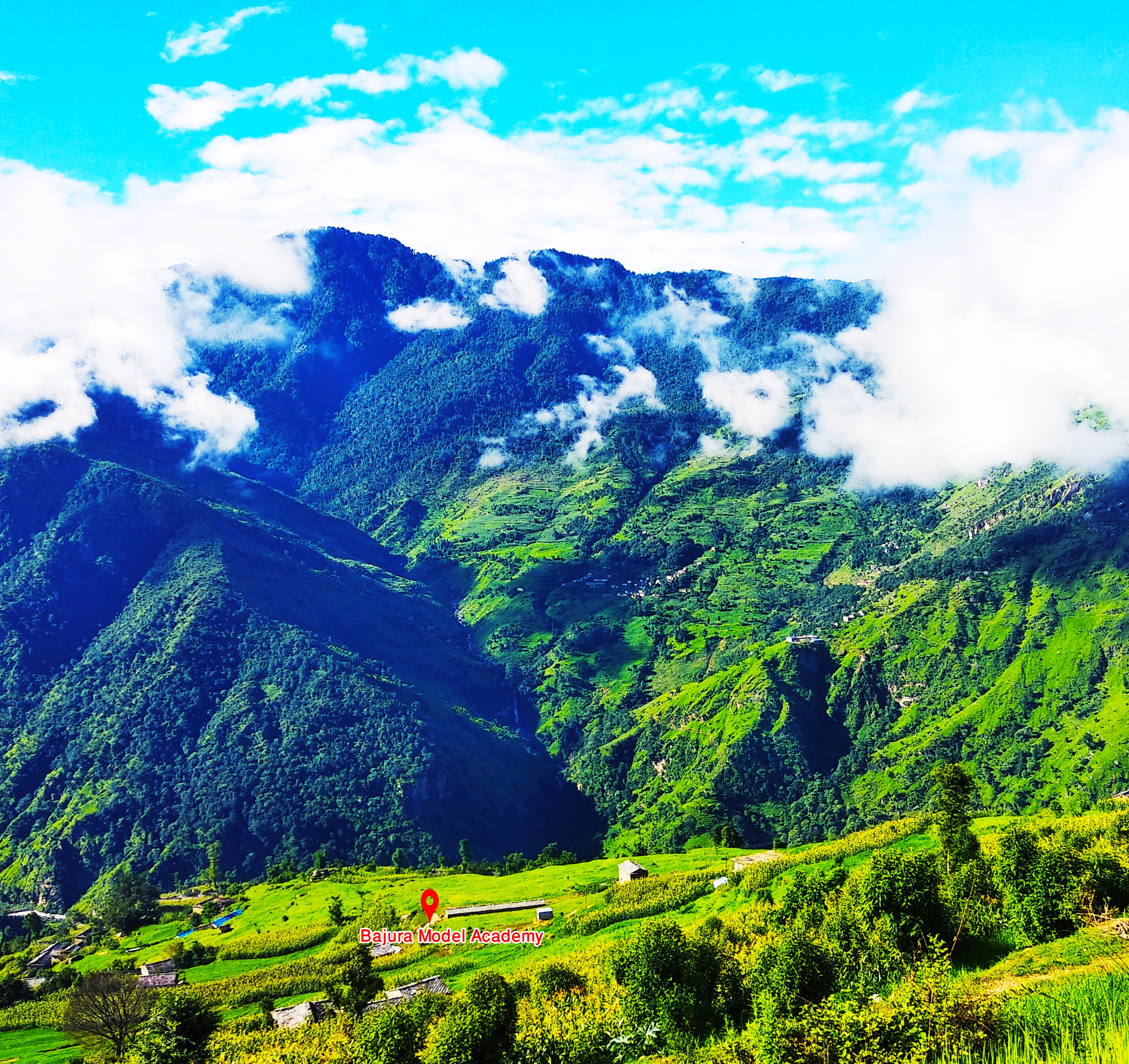
Bajura Model Academy

Bahrabis, Bajura

- Shree Trishakti Higher Secondary School, Tallakot, Bajura

The school is providing plus two level education in Management and Education faculty.

== Photos of Bajura ==
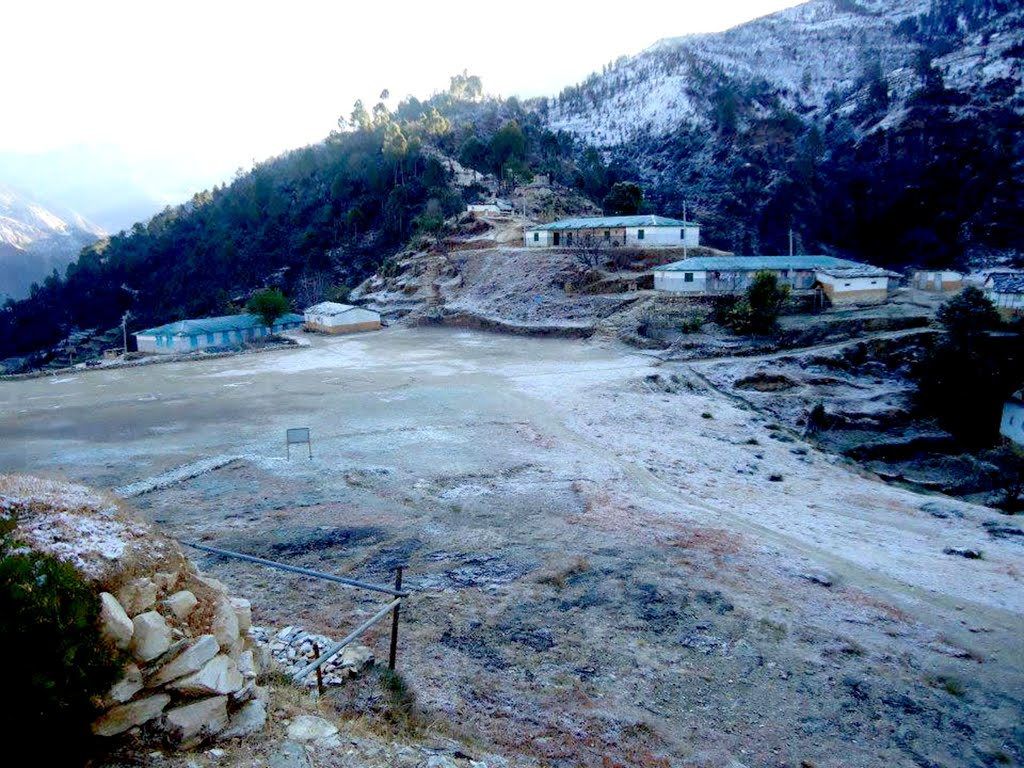
View of Army Camp

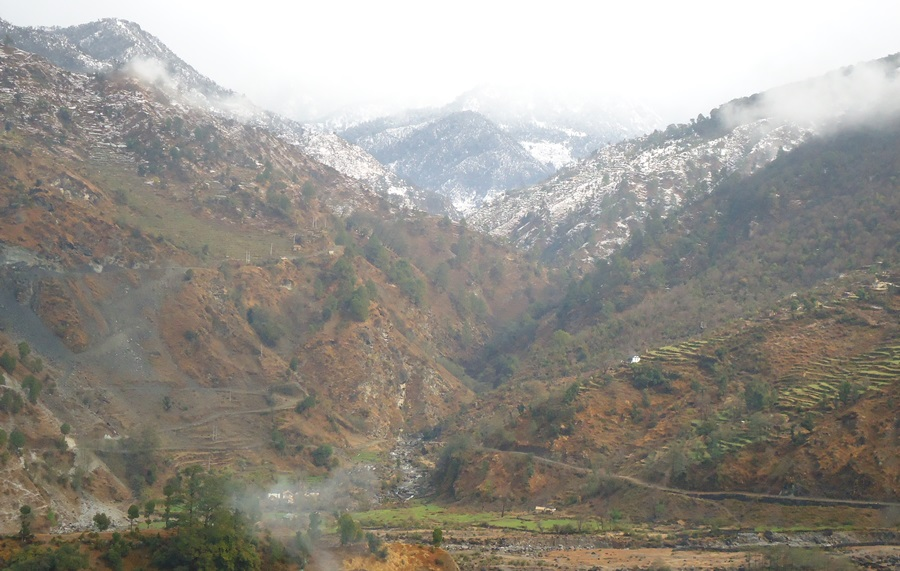
view of mountain from Martadi Bajar

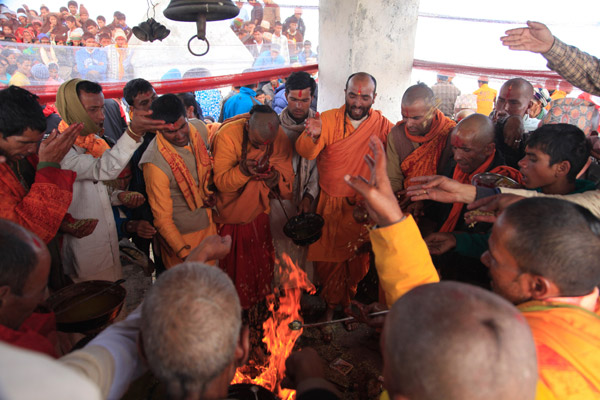
Badi Malika Temple & Patan Pooja

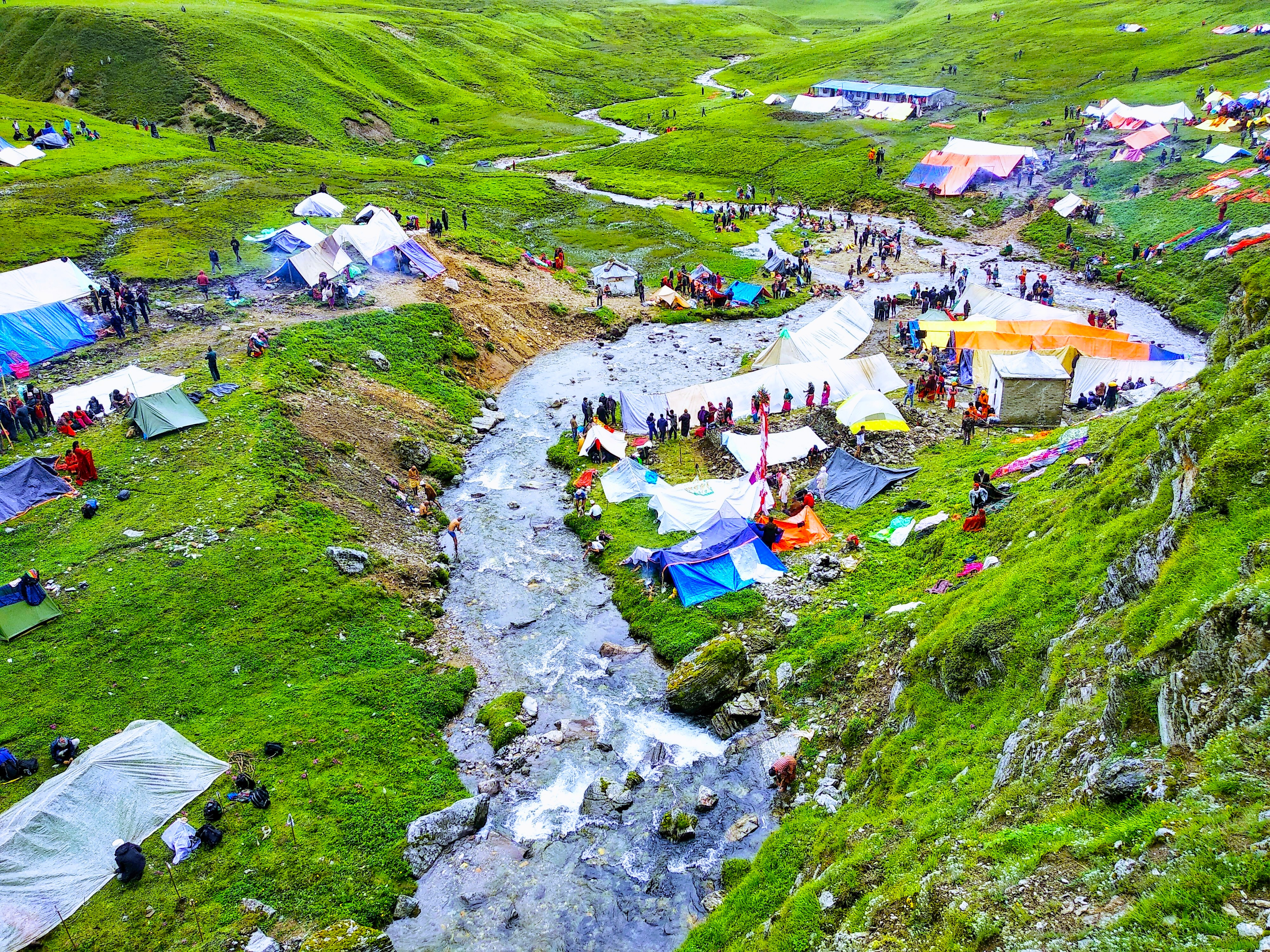
Triveni, Holy river visited before Badimalika

== See also ==
- Martadi
