= Bhimsen Thapa Rural Municipality =

Rural Municipality (Gaunpalika) in Gandaki, Nepal

Bhimsen Thapa Rural Municipality भिमसेनथापा गाउँपालिका
- Gaunpalika
- Location in Nepal Bhimsen Thapa Rural Municipality (Nepal) Bhimsen Thapa Rural Municipality (Tibet)
- Coordinates: 28°02′N 84°43′E
- Country: Nepal
- Province: Gandaki
- District: Gorkha District

Area
  - Total: 101.35 km^{2} (39.13 sq mi)

Population
  - Total: 22,033
  - Density: 217.40/km^{2} (563.05/sq mi)
- Time zone: UTC+5:45 (Nepal Time)
- Website: http://bhimsenthapamun.gov.np/

Bhimsen Thapa Municipality (Nepali: भिमसेनथापा गाँउपालिका) is a Rural Municipality a.k.a. Gaunpalika in Gorkha District in Gandaki Province of Nepal. On 12 March 2017, the government of Nepal implemented a new local administrative structure, with the implementation of the new local administrative structure, VDCs have been replaced with Urban Municipality and Rural Municipality. Bhimsen Thapa is one of these 753 local units. It represents - Masel VDC for ward number 1, Tandrang VDC for ward number 2 and 3, Dhawa VDC for ward number 4, Baguwa VDC for ward number 5, Ashrang VDC for ward number 6, and Borlang VDC for ward number 7 and 8.

== Demographics ==
At the time of the 2011 Nepal census, Bhimsen Thapa Rural Municipality had a population of 22,053. Of these, 95.1% spoke Nepali, 2.0% Urdu, 1.2% Newar, 1.0% Tamang, 0.2% Bajjika, 0.2% Gurung and 0.1% Magar as their first language.

In terms of ethnicity/caste, 40.2% were Hill Brahmin, 12.3% Newar, 10.6% Sarki, 10.1% Chhetri, 6.1% Magar, 4.5% Kami, 3.4% Brahmu/Baramo, 3.4% Kumal, 2.8% Damai/Dholi, 2.2% Musalman, 1.1% Darai, 1.1% Gurung, 1.0% Tamang, 0.6% Gharti/Bhujel, 0.1% Badi, 0.1% Gaine and 0.2% others.

In terms of religion, 95.0% were Hindu, 2.2% Muslim, 1.9% Buddhist, 0.6% Christian and 0.2% Prakriti.

In terms of literacy, 67.5% could both read and write, 3.0% could read but not write and 29.5% could neither read nor write.
