= 2026 Budhi Gandaki flood =

Flash flood disaster in Nepal

- Starting point of flood
- Date: 11 October 2026
- Time: c. 4:00 a.m. (NPT)
- Location: Gorkha District, Gandaki Province, Nepal
- Type: Flash flood, debris flow
- Cause: Landslide
- Missing: 5-6

On the morning of 11 October 2026, a flash flood occurred in the Budhi Gandaki River in Gorkha District, Gandaki Province, Nepal, which damaged settlements, bridges and infrastructure in Chumnubri and Dharche rural municipalities. The flood and debris flow swept away houses and bridges, while inundating homes in several settlements and putting others at risk. A construction camp and equipment belonging to a hydropower project were also swept away. At least five to six people were reported missing.

== Background ==
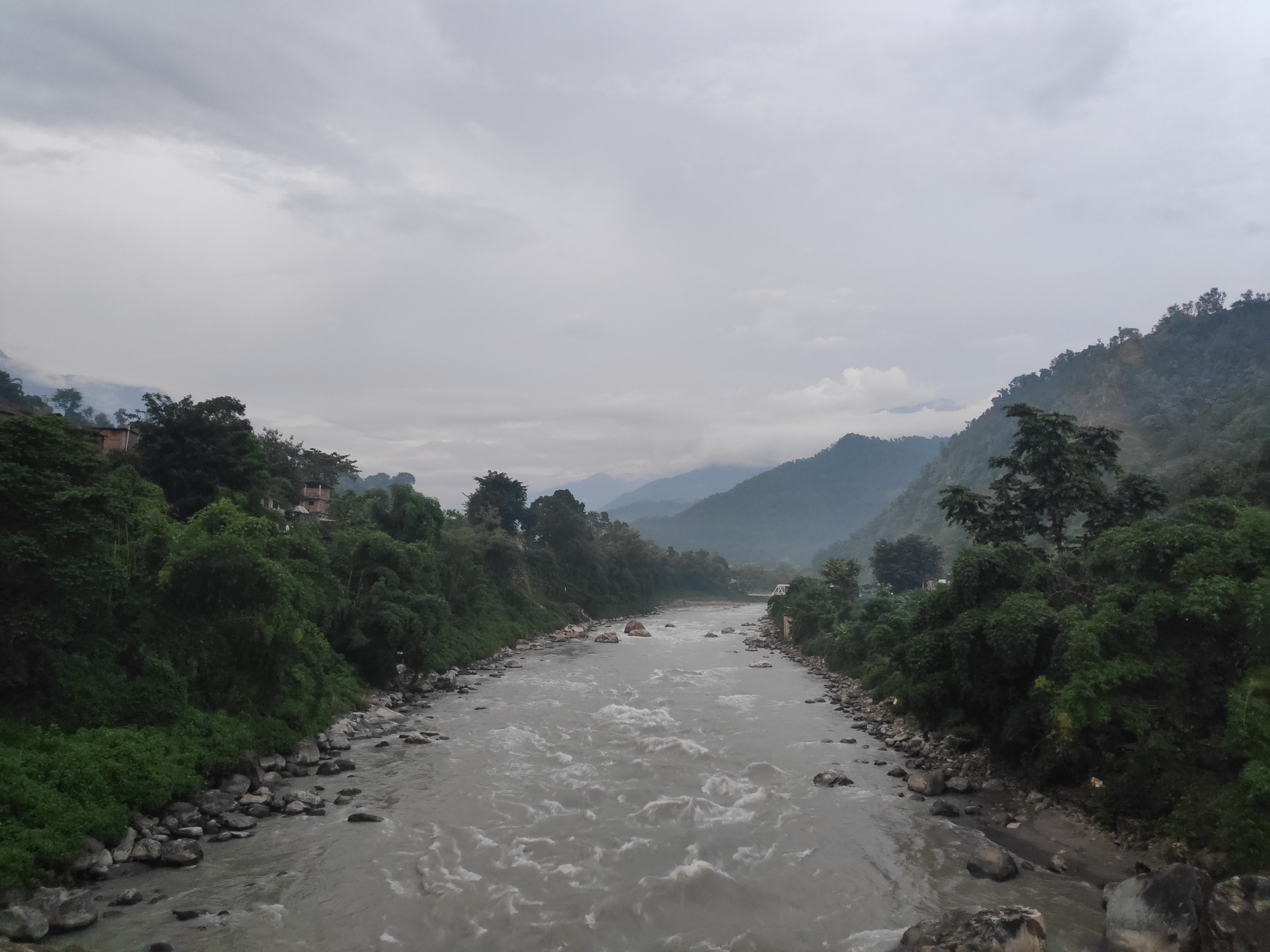
Budi Gandaki River

The Budhi Gandaki River is a tributary of the Trishuli River, downstream from another tributary where a glacier collapse caused a catastrophic flood in August that killed 1,497 people, with nearly 6,000 still missing. Following the August flooding, president Ram Chandra Paudel shortened the waiting period to declare missing victims dead from 12 years to about 1½ months.

== Description ==
Information about a major flood in the Chumchet area of Chumanubri Rural Municipality was received around 4 a.m. The flood damaged lower and upper areas. According to senior hydrologist Binod Parajuli, the first flood reached Arughat at around 6:30 a.m. The flood was relatively small. SMS alerts were sent to downstream areas around 6:40 a.m. The second flood reached at 7:50 a.m., which crossed the danger level in Arughat. After that, the water level decreased and the third flood came towards Arughat again. Parajuli stated that there is little chance of a major impact on Arughat or the lower areas immediately. Floods caused significant damage in the upper areas. The height of the flood reportedly reached a record breaking 20 metres (66 ft) in the upper areas. By 8:37 a.m., the Government of Nepal measured the water level at 8.43 metres (27.7 ft) and rising, higher than the 4.5 metres (15 ft) warning level and 5 metres (16 ft) danger level. Flood risk heightened in the area between Benighat and Muglin after the water level of the Budhi Gandaki River exceeded the danger line.

Preliminary reports suggest that a landslide may have blocked the Syar River between Lokpa and Chumling in Chumanuwri Rural Municipality-6, triggering the flood. Another possible cause is a landslide that blocked the river near the Ungilung River in Chumchet. Initial analysis suggests that the flooding is unlikely to have occurred due to the rainfall at the scene over the past 24 hours, as only sporadic rainfall was observed. The exact cause has yet to be established, and authorities are still collecting details of the damage.

== Damage ==
Satellite imagery before and after the flooding.

Floods submerged Narsingh Dham, a famous religious tourist destination in Dhading. Nearly 35 houses were swept away in Painyu and Bagar of Chumanuwri Rural Municipality-3. More than 10 houses in Salleri, Paiyun, and Jagat Bagar were swept away, according to Ram Kumar Gurung, ward chair of Chumnubri-3. One unreinforced house in Sirdibas was swept away, while floodwater entered other houses. A suspension footbridge connecting Nyakchet and Sirdibas was swept away. Home minister Sudan Gurung also reported that a bridge linking Nyakchet and Philim Bazar had been destroyed. A suspension footbridge connecting Machhakhola and Kerauja was swept away. Floodwater entered five to seven houses and five to seven temporary structures in the lower settlement, according to preliminary reports. Locals said some houses had already been swept away. Around 20 to 22 houses were reported to be at risk in Dharche-3, Salleri. A motorable iron bridge at Soti, which connects the Aarughat was swept away. Floodwaters swept away the construction camp and some equipment at the site of the 341-megawatt semi-reservoir-type Budhi Gandaki hydropower project under construction in Salleri, Chumnubri-3. The 24.5 MW Dobhan Khola Hydropower Project, the 30.59 MW Yaru Khola Hydropower Project, and the 16 MW Machha Khola Hydropower Project were also damaged. The flood swept away the major bridge at Arughat linking Dhading and Gorkha districts.

== Casualties ==
At least 10 people were initially reported missing, however, the number was later revised to five to six. Among the missing were reported to be two women and three men living in a shed on the banks of the Ungilung River in Chumchet. 95 others were rescued by five helicopters, including nine foreign nationals and six people airlifted from Jagat.

Authorities have yet to establish the full extent of the damage or confirm whether the flooding caused any deaths.

== See also ==
- 2026 Nepal Tibet floods
- List of flash floods
