= Bridge to Nowhere (Nepal) =

- Crosses: Daraudi River
- Locale: Gorkha Municipality, Gandaki Province, Nepal

Characteristics
- Design: Concrete bridge
- Material: Concrete

The Bridge to Nowhere is a concrete road bridge meant to connect Gorkha Municipality and Siranchowk Rural Municipality in Gorkha District, Gandaki Province, Nepal. It has no roads leading to it.

It is being built across the Daraudi River to provide road access to Nareshwar, Gorkha municipality-3 and Jarebar, Siranchowk rural municipality-5. The intention is to build roads to it later, but the area required to construct roads to the bridge belongs to local farmers and no plans have been initiated to acquire and compensate the farmers.

== See also ==
- List of bridges in Nepal
