= Gorkha Bridge =

Cantilever bridge in Gorkha District

Gorkha Bridge गोरखा पुल
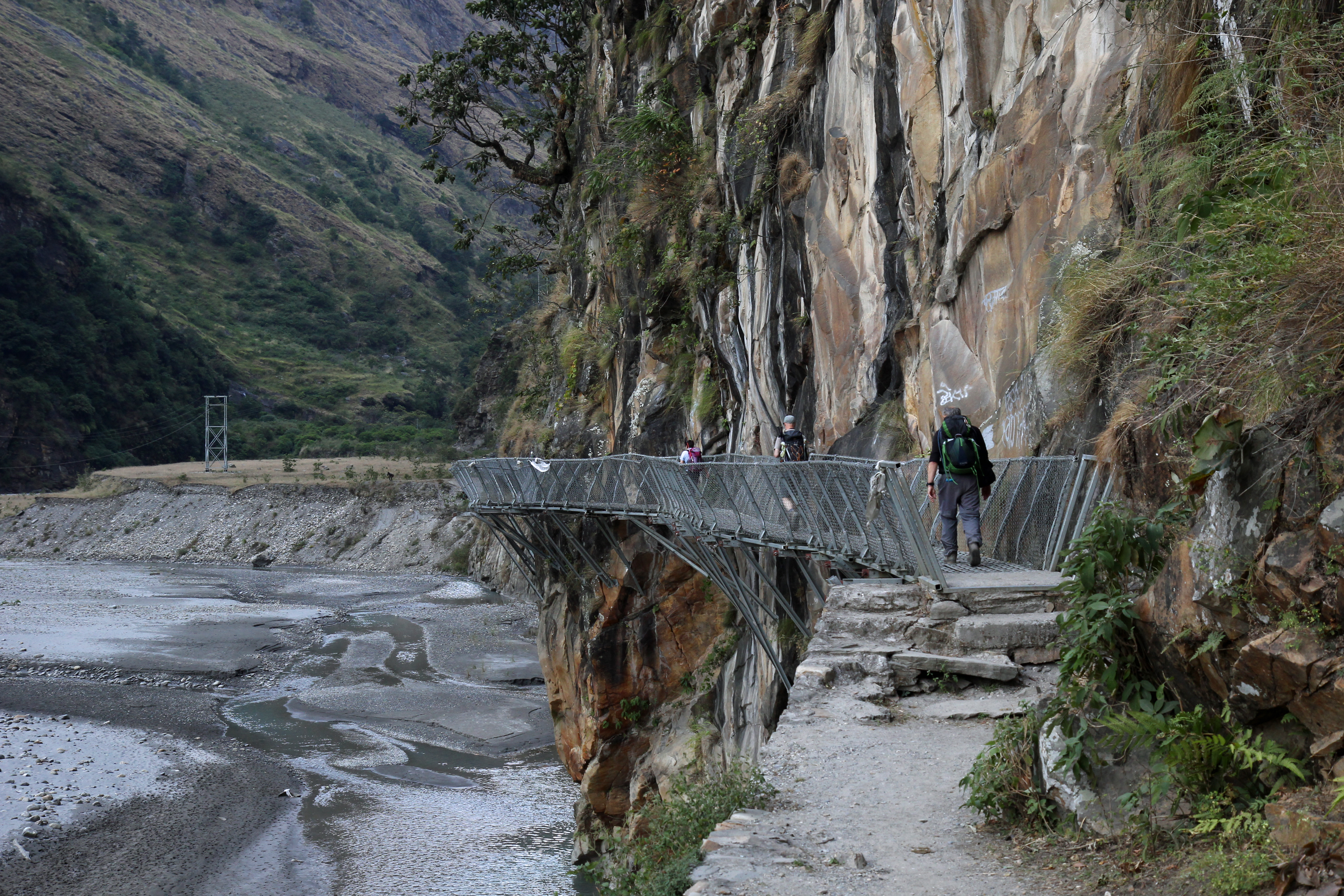
- Coordinates: 28°19′52″N 84°54′25″E
- Owner: Nepal
- Followed by: Tsum Valley Bridge

Characteristics
- Design: Department for International Development
- Total length: 195 m (640 ft)
- Traversable?: yes

The Gorkha Bridge is a 195 m-long (640 ft) cantilever footbridge connecting Sirdibas and Kerauja, Gorkha in Nepal. It was constructed with the help of the Department for International Development, engineers from Switzerland, and 400 local workers. The bridge cost approximately NPR 38 million, and was constructed by attaching the trusses to the side of a cliff.

== History ==
The April 2015 Nepal earthquake triggered a landslide which shifted the course of the Budhi Gandaki River eastwards. This shift destroyed previously used paths in Sirdibas and Kerauja. Seven villages in the northern portion of the Gorkha district were cut off from the district headquarters. These paths were critical for accessing the Aarughat, where food and other supplies were purchased. With the valley paths gone, the alternative trails went over steep and rocky hills, adding two hours to the journey which increased the price of goods. Before the earthquake, the Manaslu Circuit trail had about 5,000 people traversing it annually. The restored trail follows an ancient salt-trading route along the steep-sided river.

With the help of the Department for International Development, the bridge was constructed by 400 local residents led by a company from Switzerland. The local workers were taught mountaineering skills to be able to work on the cliff face. The bridge was built by drilling into the cliff to provide locations to attach steel trusses and a platform. The whole project cost around NPR 38 million (~ $320,000). Materials were delivered to the valley by helicopter. The cantilever bridge has been called the "first of its kind in Nepal" by the District Development Committee. The bridge is used by schoolchildren, mules, and trekkers. Upon completion of the bridge, the team started work on building another cantilever bridge in the Tsum Valley. The average lifespan of such bridges is around 50 years. The construction of the Gorkha Bridge was finished in June 2016, and DFID handed over the bridge to the local government on 17 January 2018.

== See also ==
- Kali Gandaki Gorge
