= Ghale language =

Tibeto-Burman language spoken in Nepal

Ghale
- ŋinʌ22 kɰe55
- Native to: Nepal
- Native speakers: 23,049 (2021 census)
- Language family: Sino-Tibetan: Tamangic?; Ghale languages; Ghale

Language codes
- ISO 639-3: Either: ghh – Northern ghe – Southern
- Glottolog: nucl1818 Nuclear Ghale
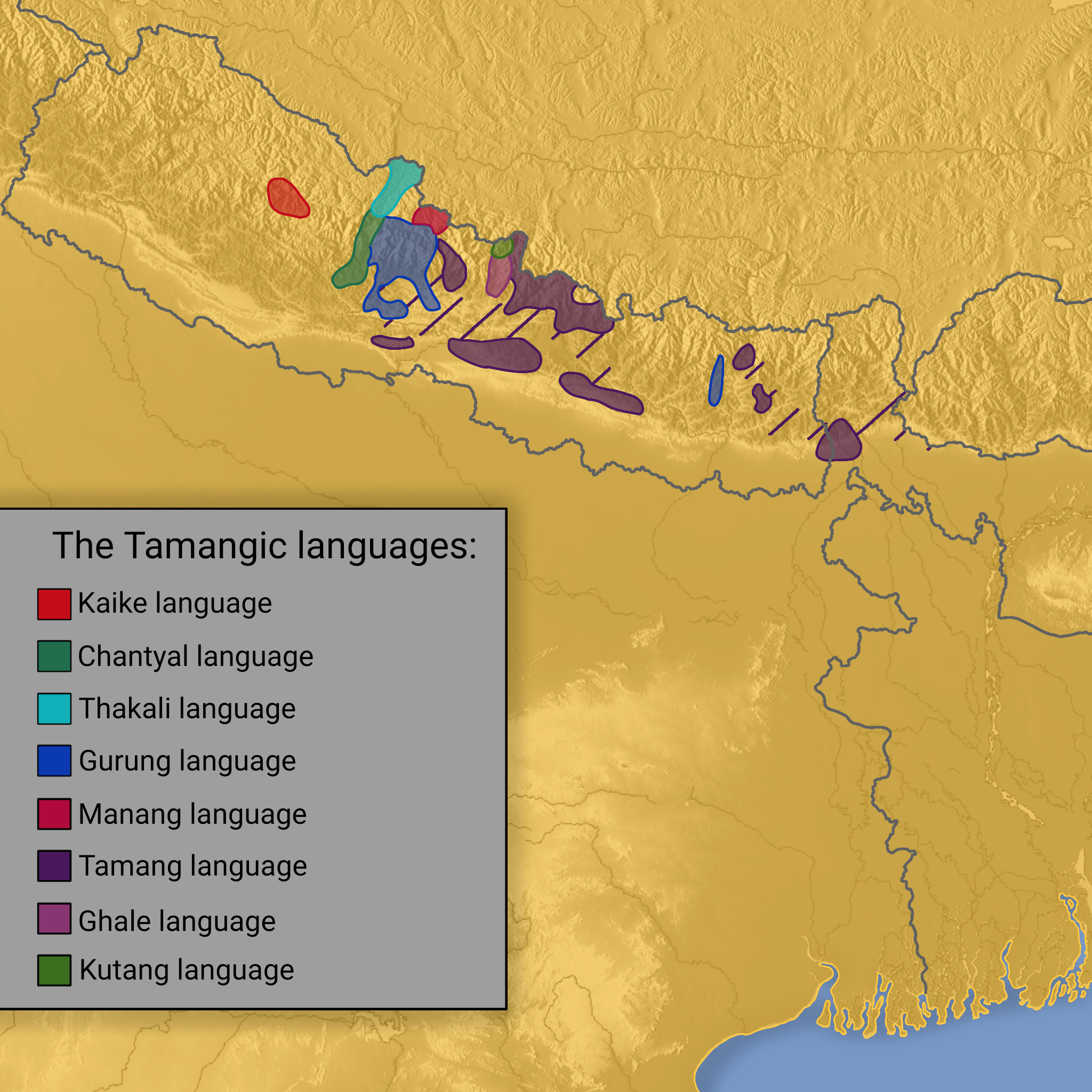

- Ghale is classified as Vulnerable by the UNESCO Atlas of the World's Languages in Danger.

Ghale is a Tibeto-Burman language of Nepal. It belongs to the group of Ghale languages. The dialects of Ghale have limited intelligibility: (south) Barpak, Kyaura, Laprak, (north) Khorla, Uiya, Jagat, Philim, Nyak. 23,049 speakers of Ghale were recorded in the 2021 Nepal census.

== Status ==
Ghale is classified as Vulnerable by the Atlas of the World's Languages in Danger. The language is learnt by children and used in domains of life except for interactions with outsiders, but it is not usually written, no standard orthography has been established, and is not used in schools. Emigration away from Ghale-speaking villages may result in depopulation of Ghale speakers, as it is sometimes not learned by those who are raised in urban areas. Attitude towards Ghale remains positive and value it as an element of their culture.

== Geographical distribution ==
Ghale is spoken in northern Gorkha District in Gandaki Province, in villages including Saurapani, Simjung, Barpak, Laprak, Gumda, Lapu, Uiya, and Sirdibas. Barpak is the most populous of the Ghale-speaking villages. The villages are inhabited by both Ghale and Gurung people, some homogeneously, while others are populated by multiple ethnicities. Gurung, a member of the Tamangic languages, is found east of Ghale, Nepali to its south, and Kutang, Tsum, and Nubri to its north.

== Name ==
Ghale is referred to natively by both Gurung and Ghale people as ŋinʌ22 kɰe55 'our language'. Ghale speakers of the language call it Ghale or lilʌ25 kɰe55 'Ghale language' when speaking with outsiders, and Gurung speakers call it Gurung in these situations.

== History ==
=== Documentation ===
Previously, a sketch grammar, a phonology, and various vocabularies constituted the documentation of Ghale. A 2026 grammar represents the first full description of Ghale.

== Dialects ==
Ethnologue divides Ghale into the Northern and Southern varieties.

- Northern Ghale (4,440 speakers as of 2006) is spoken in Buri Gandaki valley in Gorkha District, Gandaki Province. Dialects are Khorla, Uiya, Jagat, Philim, and Nyak.
- Southern Ghale (21,500 speakers as of 2006) is spoken in the hills south of Macha Khola in Gorkha District, Gandaki Province. Dialects are Barpak, Kyaura, and Laprak.

== Phonology ==
=== Consonants ===
20 or 21 consonants are phonemic in Ghale. Yoshida analyzes the /ɥ/ of Khadgi as /jw/.

		Labial	Dental/ Alveolar	Retroflex	Palatal	Velar	Glottal
Plosive	voiceless	p	t	ʈ		k	
Plosive	aspirated	pʰ	tʰ	ʈʰ		kʰ	
Affricate	voiceless		ts				
Affricate	aspirated		tsʰ				
Fricative			s				h
Nasal		m	n			ŋ	
Lateral			l				
Rhotic			r				
Approximant		w	(ɥ)		j	ɰ	
