= Warpak =

Barpak वारपाक
- Village development committee
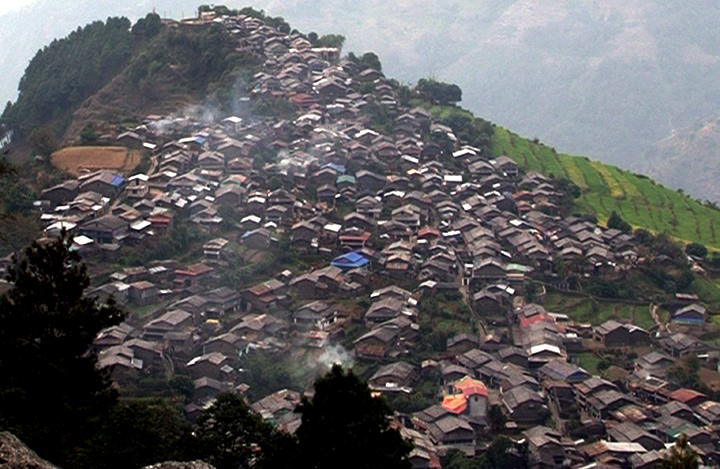
- Barpak village

- Location in Nepal Barpak (Nepal)
- Coordinates: 28.23°N 84.76°E
- Country: Nepal
- Zone: Gandaki Zone
- District: Gorkha District

Population (1991)
  - Total: 4,556
- Time zone: UTC+5:45 (Nepal Time)

Barpak is a village development committee in Gorkha District in the Gandaki Zone of northern-central Nepal. It is centered on the village of Barpak. At the time of the 1991 Nepal census it had a population of 4,556 and had 888 houses.

Being close to the epicenter and lodged on a steep hillside, Barpak was extremely hard hit by the April 2015 Nepal earthquake.
