= Takukot =

Takukot ताकुकोट
- Ward of Rural Municipality
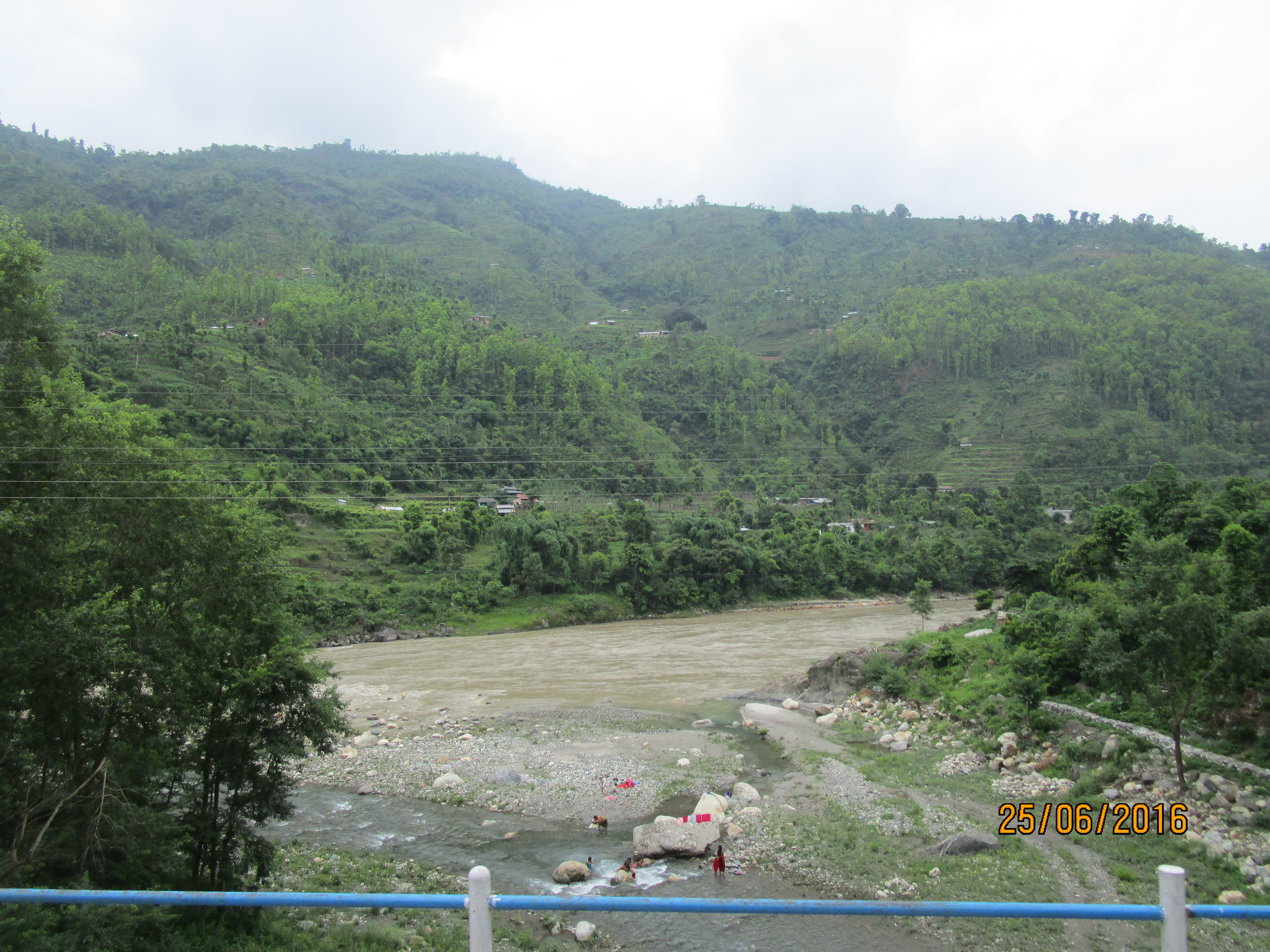
- Meeting place of Hudi khola at Daroudi River

- Location in Nepal Takukot (Nepal)
- Coordinates: 28.08°N 84.69°E
- Country: Nepal
- Zone: Gandaki Province
- District: Gorkha District

Population (1991)
  - Total: 4,234
- Time zone: UTC+5:45 (Nepal Time)

Takukot is a Ward of Barpak sulikot Rural Municipality in Gorkha District in the Gandaki Province of northern-central Nepal. At the time of the 1991 Nepal census, it had a population of 4,234 and had 801 houses in the town.

Surya Jyoti Secondary School is situated at Takukot VDC, Ward No. 4, Palkhu. Primary Schools are established at every ward of the VDC. The main transit point for trading and other purposes is Palkhu Bazar. Micro Hydro Power is implementing from the Hudi Khola as Hudi Khola Micro Hydro Project with the effort of Local peoples. Peoples of wards no. 1, 2, 3, 4, 5, and 6 are receiving advantages from hydroelectricity. Sub-Health Post is situated at Palkhu Bazar and the VDC Office is situated at Ward No. 1, Kotthok.

== History of Takukot ==
People believed Takukot was ruled by Ghale King end of 15th century.

== See also ==
- Sulikot
- Ligligkot
- Saurpani
- Ghunchok
