= Ajirkot Rural Municipality =

Place in Nepal

Ajirkot Rural Municipality अजिरकोट गाँउपालिका
- Gaunpalika
- Location in Nepal
- Coordinates: 28.164791°N 84.633159°E
- Country: Nepal
- Province: Gandaki
- District: Gorkha District

Area
  - Total: 198.05 km^{2} (76.47 sq mi)

Population
  - Total: 18,802
  - Density: 94.936/km^{2} (245.88/sq mi)
- Time zone: UTC+5:45 (Nepal Time)
- Website: http://ajirkotmun.gov.np/

Ajirkot Rural Municipality (Nepali :अजिरकोट गाँउपालिका) is a Gaunpalika in Gorkha District in Gandaki Province of Nepal. On 12 March 2017, the government of Nepal implemented a new local administrative structure, with the implementation of the new local administrative structure, VDCs have been replaced with municipal and Village Councils. Ajirkot is one of these 753 local units.

== Demographics ==
At the time of the 2011 Nepal census, Ajirkot Rural Municipality had a population of 15,602. Of these, 56.8% spoke Nepali, 30.7% Gurung, 10.5% Tamang, 1.0% Newar, 0.3% Ghale, 0.2% Sherpa, 0.1% Yolmo and 0.4% other languages as their first language.

In terms of ethnicity/caste, 34.6% were Gurung, 21.1% Hill Brahmin, 12.9% Tamang, 8.2% Sarki, 7.1% Kami, 4.0% Chhetri, 3.2% Damai/Dholi, 2.4% Magar, 2.1% Newar, 1.9% Ghale, 1.5% Gharti/Bhujel, 0.2% Sherpa, 0.1% other Dalit, 0.1% Marwari, 0.1% Musalman, 0.1% Sanyasi/Dasnami, 0.1% Tharu and 0.3% others.

In terms of religion, 60.0% were Hindu, 38.8% Buddhist, 0.9% Christian and 0.1% Muslim.

In terms of literacy, 66.7% could both read and write, 2.9% could read but not write and 30.3% could neither read nor write.
