= Aaru Arbang =

Place in Nepal

Aaru Arbang आरु अर्बाङ
- Village development committee
- Location in Nepal Aaru Arbang (Nepal)
- Coordinates: 28°5′24″N 84°48′0″E
- Country: Nepal
- Zone: Gandaki Zone
- District: Gorkha District

Population (1991)
  - Total: 5,012
- Time zone: UTC+5:45 (Nepal Time)

Aaru Arbang is a village development committee in Gorkha District in the Gandaki Zone of northern-central Nepal. At the time of the 1991 Nepal census, the total population of the village was 5,012.
