= Laprak =

Laprak लाप्राक लाप्र
- Former Village development committee
- Location in Nepal Laprak (Nepal)
- Coordinates: 28.29°N 84.78°E
- Country: Nepal
- Province: Gandaki Province
- District: Gorkha District

Government

Population (1991)
  - Total: 2,165
- Time zone: UTC+5:45 (Nepal Time)

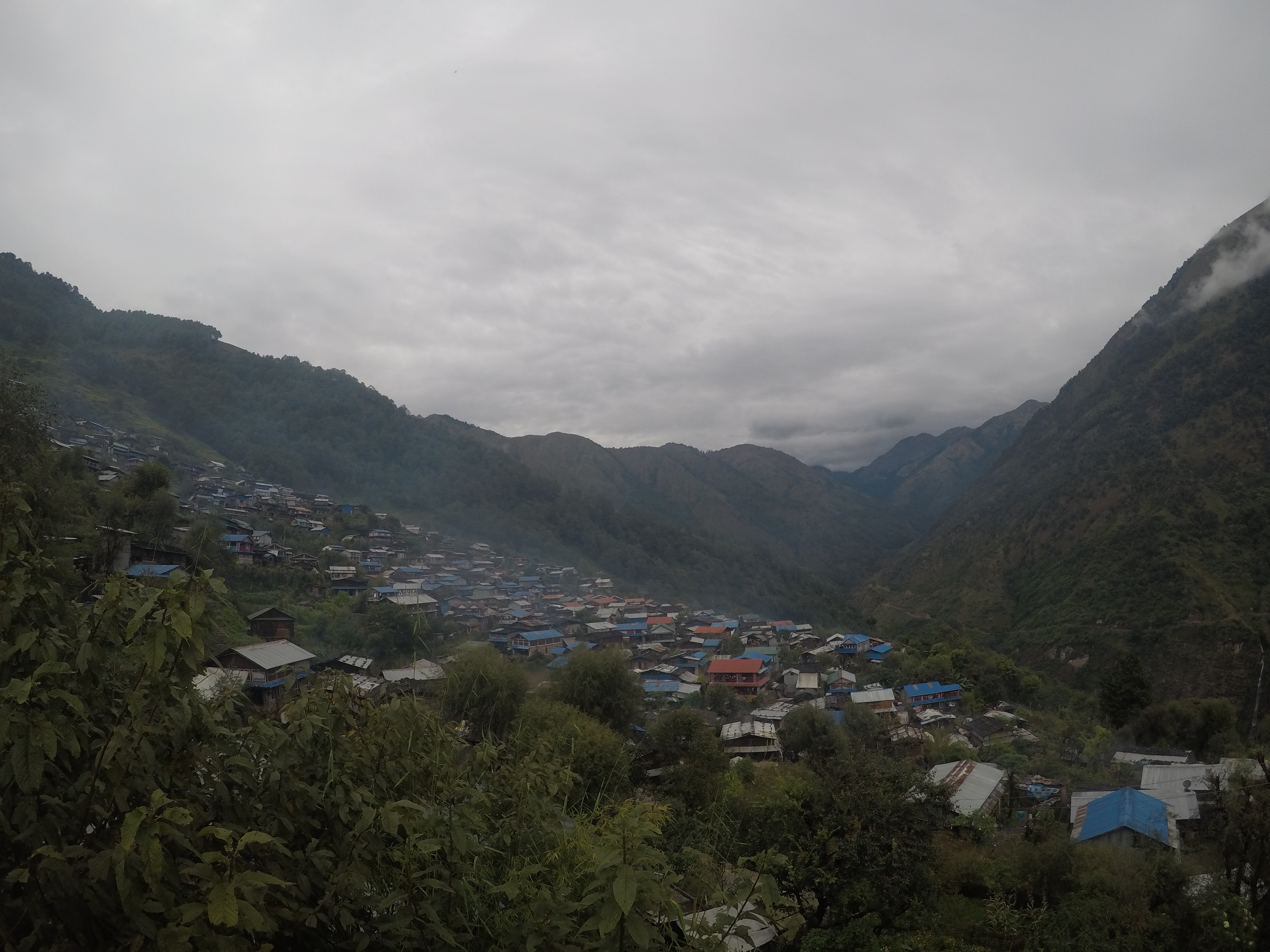
Laprak in 2021

Laprak is situated in the Dharche Rural Municipality in Gorkha District in the Gandaki Province (previously Gandaki Zone) of northern-central Nepal. Laprak is densely inhabited by Gurungs and few number of Sunars. At the time of the 1991 Nepal census it had a population of 2,165 and had 462 houses in the village.

There are more than 600 houses in this village. Laprak village can be reached by direct bus transportation from Gorkha, Kathmandu, Pokhara, Chitwan except in rainy season.

Laprak is at an elevation about 2,200 m (7,200 ft) to 2,800 m (9,200 ft) above sea level of Gorkha and approximately 70 km (43 mi) away from Gorkha Bazar.
