= Aarupokhari =

Aarupokhari आरूपोखरी Arupokhari
- Village development committee
- Location in Nepal Aarupokhari (Nepal)
- Coordinates: 28.06°N 84.78°E
- Country: Nepal
- Zone: Gandaki Zone
- District: Gorkha District
- Elevation: 917 m (3,009 ft)

Population (1991)
  - Total: 5,465
- Time zone: UTC+5:45 (Nepal Time)

Aarupokhari (आरूपोखारी), also spelled Aarupokhari, is a village development committee in Gorkha District in the Gandaki Zone of northern-central Nepal. At the time of the 1991 Nepal census it had a population of 5,465 and had 898 houses in the town.

Arupokhari sits on a foothill on top of which there is a Hindu temple. The town's water sources are springs that come out of the ground. There is electricity, but it is intermittent. From the village, one can see Manaslu in the Ganesh range to the north.

== Economy ==
Most of the citizens are farmers, and those who have other occupations still farm as well. The major crops grown there are corn, beans, and potatoes, but mangos, bananas, and other things grow there as well. Most of the houses are constructed with bricks plastered by mud, with mud used as mortar in-between the bricks. The roofs are tin, and the floors are dried mud. Most citizens own cellphones, and there is at least one cell tower in the village.

== Education ==
There are at least 2 schools in the village: one elementary and one secondary. The elementary school is called the Sarswati Peace School. The language spoken in the village is Nepali, though there are a few people who know a little bit of English as well.

== Geography ==
The village is adjacent to Satdobato, and it is a 1-2 hour walk from Arughat, which is a slightly larger town in the valley to the southeast.

The climate in the village is subtropical and the forest is mostly deciduous. The temperature in the village during the summer is usually from 80–89 °F (27–32 °C) when it is not raining and 70–79 °F (21–26 °C) when it is raining. It is always very humid in the summer. The village was hit hard by the civil war as many of its citizens went to fight.

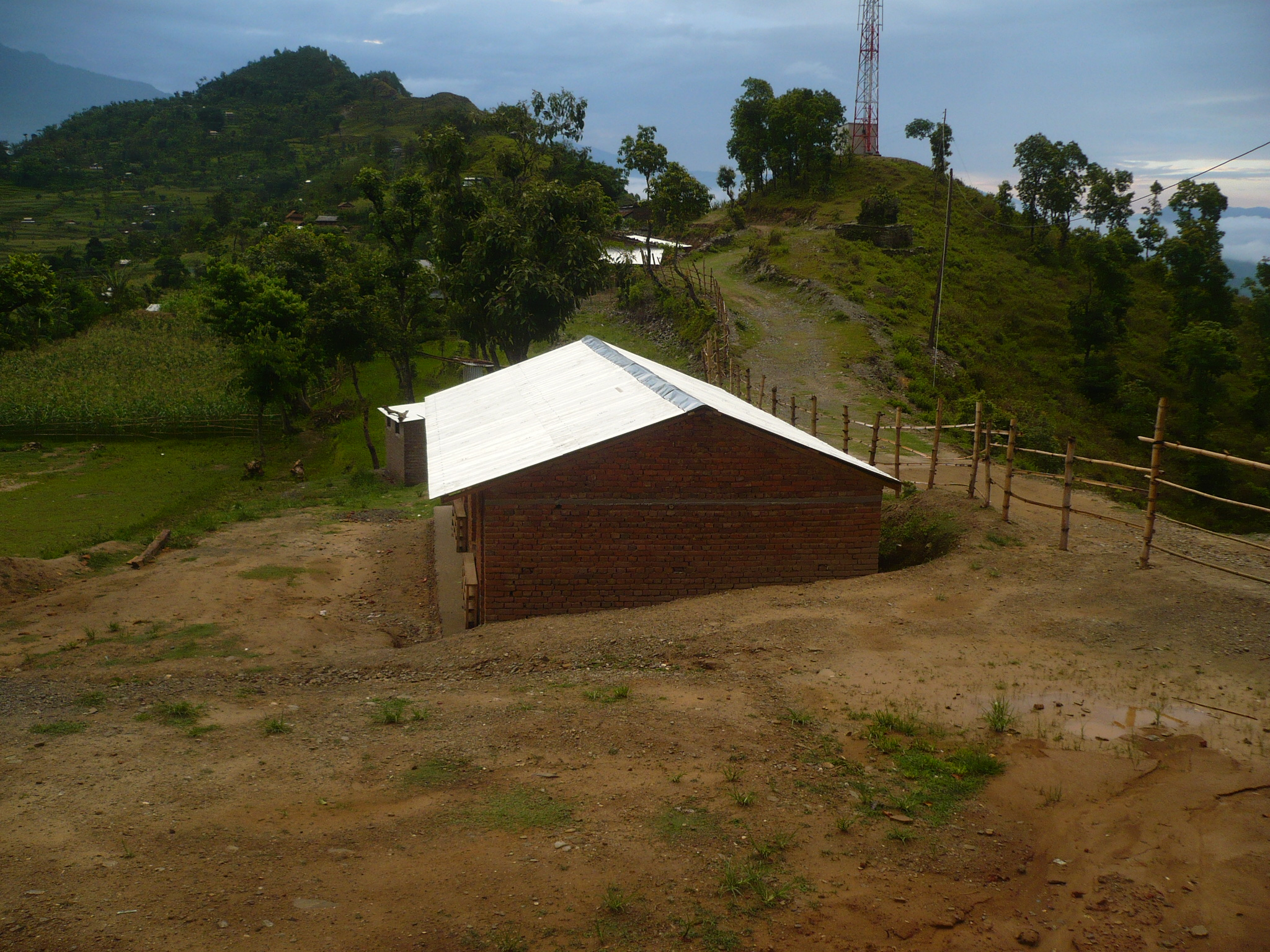
The village of Arupokhari in the background as seen from the Sarswati Peace School in the foreground
