= Harbhi =

Harmi हर्मी
- Siranchowk Rural Municipality
- Location in Nepal Harmi (Nepal)
- Coordinates: 28°5′N 84°31′E
- Country: Nepal
- Province: Gandaki Province
- District: Gorkha District
- Rural Municipality: Siranchowk Rural Municipality
- Ward: Ward No. 3

Population (2021)
  - Total: 2,570
- Time zone: UTC+5:45 (Nepal Time)

Harmi ("हर्मी") is a former village development committee (VDC) in Gorkha District of Gandaki Province, north-central Nepal. Following Nepal's local government restructuring in 2017, the former Harmi VDC was incorporated into Siranchowk Rural Municipality, primarily within Ward No. 3.

According to the 2021 Nepal census, Harmi, which is administered primarily within Ward No. 3 of Siranchowk Rural Municipality, had a total population of 2,570.

== Administrative history ==
Harmi formerly functioned as Shree Harmi Village Development Committee under Nepal's previous local administrative system. In 2017, the Government of Nepal replaced Village Development Committees and municipalities with newly structured local governments, including rural municipalities and urban municipalities.

Following this restructuring, the former Harmi VDC became part of Siranchowk Rural Municipality. Most of the former VDC area is administered under Ward No. 3.

== Demographics ==
According to the 2021 Nepal census, Harmi, which is administered primarily within Ward No. 3 of Siranchowk Rural Municipality, had a total population of 2,570. The sex ratio was 85.96 males per 100 females.

== Ethnicity ==
According to the 2021 Nepal census, the largest ethnic groups in Siranchowk Rural Municipality were Gurung (4,777), Brahman–Hill (3,071), Kshetri (2,286), Mijar (2,105), Bishwokarma (1,719), Kumal (929), Pariyar (921), Tamang (851), Magar (716), and Newar (694).
