= Namjung =

Village development committee in Gandaki Zone, Nepal

Namjung, Gorkha नामजुङ
- Village development committee
- Location in Nepal Namjung, Gorkha (Nepal)
- Coordinates: 27.94°N 84.71°E
- Country: Nepal
- Zone: Gandaki Zone
- District: Gorkha District

Population (1991)
  - Total: 3,370
- Time zone: UTC+5:45 (Nepal Time)

== Overview ==
Namjung is a village development committee in Gorkha District in the Gandaki Zone of northern-central Nepal. At the time of the 1991 Nepal census it had a population of 3,370 and had 627 houses in the town.
