= Phinam =

Phinam फिनाम
- former Village development committee
- Location in Nepal Phinam (Nepal)
- Coordinates: 28.00°N 84.65°E
- Country: Nepal
- District: Gorkha District

Population (1991)
  - Total: 2,993
- Time zone: UTC+5:45 (Nepal Time)

Phinam (Nepali: फिनाम) was a village development committee in Gorkha District in the Gandaki Zone of northern-central Nepal. It was merged into Gorkha Municipality in 2014. At the time of the 1991 Nepal census, it had a population of 2,993 and had 580 houses in the town.

== Notable people from Phinam ==
- Bhimsen Thapa, Mukhtiyar of Nepal
