= LHO =

LHO could refer to:

- Lee Harvey Oswald, U.S. Marine veteran who assassinated U.S. President John F. Kennedy
- Langho railway station, England; National Rail station code LHO.
- Live Human Organs (Cargo Code, see List of aviation, aerospace and aeronautical abbreviations)

== See also ==
- Lho, village in Nepal
- Asian name Lho
- one of the Cree syllabics
