= Asrang =

Asrang अश्राङ
- Village development committee
- Location in Nepal Asrang (Nepal)
- Coordinates: 28.00°N 84.71°E
- Country: Nepal
- Zone: Gandaki Zone
- District: Gorkha District

Population (1991)
  - Total: 3,241
- Time zone: UTC+5:45 (Nepal Time)

Asrang is a village development committee in Gorkha District in the Gandaki Zone of northern-central Nepal. At the time of the 1991 Nepal census it had a population of 3,241 and had 604 houses in the town.
