= Muchhok =

Muchchok मुच्चोक
- Village development committee
- Location in Nepal Muchchok (Nepal)
- Coordinates: 28.14°N 84.66°E
- Country: Nepal
- Zone: Gandaki Zone
- District: Gorkha District

Population (1991)
  - Total: 3,663
- Time zone: UTC+5:45 (Nepal Time)

Muchchok was a village development committee in Gorkha District in the Gandaki Zone of Northern-central Nepal. At the time of the 1991 Nepal census it had a population of 3,663 and had 727 houses in the town.
