= Darbhung =

Darbung दर्वुग
- Village development committee
- Location in Nepal Darbung (Nepal)
- Coordinates: 27.87°N 84.74°E
- Country: Nepal
- Zone: Gandaki Zone
- District: Gorkha District
- Elevation: 064 m (210 ft)

Population (2016)
  - Total: 17,850
- Time zone: UTC+5:45 (Nepal Time)

Darbhung is a village development committee in Gorkha District in the Gandaki Zone of northern-central Nepal. At the time of the 68 Nepal census it had a population of 15005 and had 3900 houses in the town.
