= Bhumlichok =

Bhumlichok भुम्लिचोक
- Gandaki rural municipal -6
- Location in Nepal Bhumlichok (Nepal)
- Coordinates: 27.85°N 84.68°E
- Country: Nepal
- Zone: Gandaki Zone
- District: Gorkha District

Population (1991)
  - Total: 2,964
- Time zone: UTC+5:45 (Nepal Time)

Bhumlichok is a village development committee in Gorkha District in the Gandaki Zone of northern-central Nepal. At the time of the 1991 Nepal census it had a population of 2,964 and had 518 houses in the town.

Bhumlichok is a village development committee of Gorkha District in the Gandaki Zone of northern-central Nepal with a distance of about 95 km on the way to Prithvi Highway from Kathmandu, then need to walk about 3 to 4 hours to get in Bhumlichok. This is an appropriate location for visitors who would like to come either from Pokhara, Chitwan, or Lumbini. At the time of the 2011 Nepal census, it had a population of 3,545 and had 685 houses in the town. The geographical location of Bhumlichok is situated in the approximate latitude of 84.696171 and longitude of 27.846639 in Bhumlichok VDC of Gorkha District. It is located at the altitude of 287m Fishling at Trishuli River to 1652m elevation at Bhairabi Tar (Pokhara Tar) from the sea level. Bhumlichok has diverse culture and religion. Magar is the main inhabitants of this VDC and Chepang/Praja, Gurung, Newar are also part of this area. So, the area has varied cultures or it can be said that the area is culturally rich which one of the most imperative also features of rural tourism. The existing culture in Bhumlichok as a product, the people of Bhumlichok can promote them for tourists international as well as domestic. The temple of Bhairabi, Bhairabi Tar, Jhanda Gade(झन्डा गाडे), Dudh Pokhari is the cultural and historical attraction in Bhumlichok. Like in another part of the country, Dashain, Tihar, Teej, Mage Sankranti, Janai Purnima, Loshar celebrate with great rejoice and pleasure. Similarly, other religious festivals such as Buddha Purnima (Chandipurnuma), Bhairavithan Mela, etc. are celebrated and enjoyed. The incredible panoramic mountains view Dhaulagiri range from west to east Gourishankar including Annapurna Range, Machhapuchhere, Lamjung Himal, Manaslu Range, Ganesh Himal, Langtang Himal Range can see from Bhumlichok.
