= Panchkhuwadeurali =

Panchkhuwadeurali पञ्चकुवा देउराली
- Village development committee
- Location in Nepal Panchkhuwadeurali (Nepal)
- Coordinates: 28.09°N 84.73°E
- Country: Nepal
- Zone: Gandaki Zone
- District: Gorkha District

Population (1991)
  - Total: 2,422
- Time zone: UTC+5:45 (Nepal Time)

VDC map of Gorkha district

Panchkhuwadeurali is a village development committee in Gorkha District in the Gandaki Zone of northern-central Nepal. At the time of the 1991 Nepal census it had a population of 2,422.
