= Chhaikampar =

Chhaikampar छैकम्पार
- Village development committee
- Location in Nepal Chhaikampar (Nepal)
- Coordinates: 28.58°N 85.12°E
- Country: Nepal
- Zone: Gandaki Zone
- District: Gorkha District

Population (1991)
  - Total: 1,270
- Time zone: UTC+5:45 (Nepal Time)

Chhaikampar is a village development committee in Gorkha District in the Gandaki Zone of northern-central Nepal. At the time of the 1991 Nepal census it had a population of 1,270 and had 244 houses in the village.
