= Aaru Chanuate =

Place in Nepal

Aaru Chanuate आरु चनौटे
- Village development committee
- Location in Nepal Aaru Chanuate (Nepal)
- Coordinates: 28.07°N 84.81°E
- Country: Nepal
- Zone: Gandaki Zone
- District: Gorkha District

Population (1991)
  - Total: 2,478
- Time zone: UTC+5:45 (Nepal Time)

Aaru Chanuate is a village development committee in Gorkha District in the Gandaki Zone of northern-central Nepal. At the time of the 1991 Nepal census it had a population of 2,478 and had 494 houses in the village.
