= Kerabari, Gorkha =

Coordinates: 28°9′N 84°36′E

Kerabari केराबारी
- City
- Location in Nepal Kerabari (Nepal)
- Country: Nepal
- Zone: Gorkha District

Population (1991)
  - Total: 2,692
- Time zone: UTC+5:45 (Nepal Time)

Kerabari is a Village Development Committee in Gorkha District in the Gandaki Zone of northern-central Nepal. At the time of the 1991 Nepal census it had a population of 2,692 and had 535 houses in the village
