= Tanglichok =

Tanglichok ताङलीचोक
- Village development committee
- Location in Nepal Tanglichok (Nepal)
- Coordinates: 27.89°N 84.68°E
- Country: Nepal
- Zone: Gandaki Zone
- District: Gorkha District

Population (1991)
  - Total: 3,632
- Time zone: UTC+5:45 (Nepal Time)

Tanglichok is a village development committee in Gorkha District in the Gandaki Zone of northern-central Nepal. At the time of the 1991 Nepal census it had a population of 3,632.
