= Pandrung =

Pandrung पान्द्रुङ
- Village development committee
- Location in Nepal Pandrung (Nepal)
- Coordinates: 28.06°N 84.72°E
- Country: Nepal
- Zone: Gandaki Zone
- District: Gorkha District

Population (1991)
  - Total: 2,803
- Time zone: UTC+5:45 (Nepal Time)

Pandrung is a village development committee in Gorkha District in the Gandaki Zone of northern-central Nepal. At the time of the 1991 Nepal census it had a population of 2,803 and had 538 houses in the town.
