= Ashrang =

Coordinates: 27°7′N 85°19′E

Ashrang अश्राङ्
- Village development committee
- Location in Nepal Ashrang (Nepal)
- Country: Nepal
- Zone: Gandaki Zone
- District: Gorkha District

Population (1991)
  - Total: 3,241
- Time zone: UTC+5:45 (Nepal Time)

Ashrang is a village development committee in Gorkha District in the Gandaki Zone of central Nepal. At the time of the 1991 Nepal census it had a population of 3241 in 604 individual households.
