= Bihi =

Bihi बिही
- Village development committee
- Location in Nepal Bihi (Nepal)
- Coordinates: 28.52°N 84.88°E
- Country: Nepal
- Zone: Gandaki Zone
- District: Gorkha District

Population (1991)
  - Total: 890
- Time zone: UTC+5:45 (Nepal Time)

Bihi is a village development committee in Gorkha District in the Gandaki Zone of northern-central Nepal. At the time of the 1991 Nepal census it had a population of 890 and had 247 houses in the village.
