= Swara, Nepal =

Swara, Nepal स्वारा
- Village development committee
- Location in Nepal Swara, Nepal (Nepal)
- Coordinates: 28.12°N 84.76°E
- Country: Nepal
- Zone: Gandaki Zone
- District: Gorkha District

Population (1991)
  - Total: 3,291
- Time zone: UTC+5:45 (Nepal Time)

Swara is a village development committee in Gorkha District in the Gandaki Zone of northern-central Nepal. At the time of the 1991 Nepal census it had a population of 3,291 and had 652 houses in the town.
