= Taple =

Taple ताप्ले
- Village development committee
- Nickname: गाईखोर
- Location in Nepal Taple (Nepal)
- Coordinates: 28.026°N 84.688°E
- Country: Nepal
- Zone: Gandaki Zone
- District: Gorkha District

Population (2021)
  - Total: 4,398
- Time zone: UTC+5:45 (Nepal Time)

Taple (ताप्ले) was a village development committee in Gorkha District in the Gandaki Zone of northern-central Nepal. At the time of the 1991 Nepal census, it had a population of 4,398 and had 1000 houses in the town.

Taple VDC is currently merged with Gorkha Municipality and allotted as ward no 01 & 02. Ward no 06 to 09 of Taple VDC is allotted as ward no 01 of Gorkha Municipality whereas 01 to 05 of Taple VDC is allotted to ward no 02 of Gorkha Municipality. Chhapthok (छाप्थोक) is the biggest village of the ward no 01 of Gorkha Municipality.
