= Prok, Nepal =

Prok, Nepal प्रोक
- Village development committee
- Location in Nepal Prok, Nepal (Nepal)
- Coordinates: 28.53°N 84.79°E
- Country: Nepal
- Zone: Gandaki Zone
- District: Gorkha District

Population (1991)
  - Total: 739
- Time zone: UTC+5:45 (Nepal Time)

VDC Map of Gorkha District

Prok is a village development committee in Gorkha District in the Gandaki Zone of northern-central Nepal. At the time of the 1991 Nepal census it had a population of 739 and had 219 houses in the village.
