= Char-Jaat =

Char-Jaat, Char meaning "four" and Jaat meaning "caste" in Nepali, comprises four prominent high castes amongst the Tamu people (also known as "Gurung" in nepali language): Kle, Lam, Kon, and Lem which are called Ghale, Lama, Ghotaney and Lamichane in nepali language.

Kle (Ghales) who were known to be the Kings of the Tamu (Gurung) tribe and they married. The Lam (Lama) were the priest of Tamu (Gurung) tribe which were further classified as Meghi Lam, Pangi Lam, Krogi Lam and Fiuro Lam.

They are from South india
