= Tara Nagar =

Coordinates: 28°19′N 81°20′E

Tara Nagar तारानगर
- Village development committee
- Location in Nepal Tara Nagar (Nepal)
- Country: Nepal
- Zone: Gandaki Zone
- District: Gorkha District

Population (1991)
  - Total: 5,698
- Time zone: UTC+5:45 (Nepal Time)

Tara Nagar is a village development committee in Gorkha District in the Gandaki Zone of northern-central Nepal. At the time of the 1991 Nepal census it had a population of 5,698 and had 1066 houses.
