= Gakhu =

Gakhu गाखु
- Village development committee
- Location in Nepal Gakhu (Nepal)
- Coordinates: 28.06°N 84.62°E
- Country: Nepal
- Zone: Gandaki Zone
- District: Gorkha District

Population (1991)
  - Total: 2,870
- Time zone: UTC+5:45 (Nepal Time)

Gakhu is a village development committee in Gorkha District in the Gandaki Zone of northern-central Nepal. At the time of the 1991 Nepal census it had a population of 2,870 and had 572 houses in the town.
