= Makaising =

Makaising मकैसिङ
- Village development committee
- Location in Nepal Makaising (Nepal)
- Coordinates: 27°53′N 84°41′E
- Country: Nepal
- Zone: Gandaki Zone
- District: Gorkha District

Population (1991)
  - Total: 2,231
- Time zone: UTC+5:45 (Nepal Time)

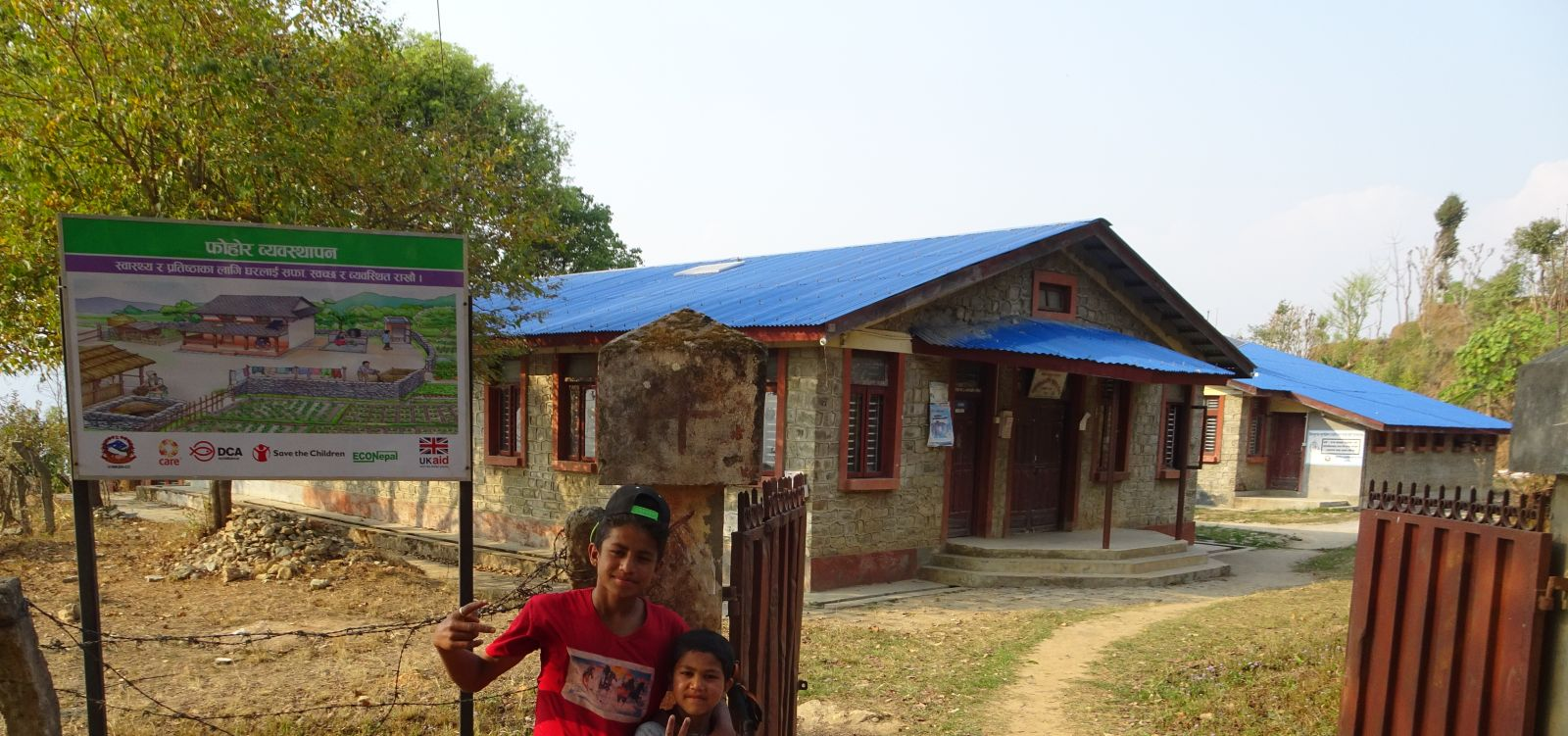
Primary health center in Makaising

Makaising is a village development committee in Gorkha District in the Gandaki Zone of northern-central Nepal. At the time of the 1991 Nepal census it had a population of 2,231 and had 416 houses in the village.

The village is connected by an unpaved road with Prithvi Highway.

It has a primary health center.
