= Kashigaun =

Kashigaun काशीगाउँ
- Village development committee
- Location in Nepal Kashigaun (Nepal)
- Coordinates: 28.20°N 84.91°E
- Country: Nepal
- Zone: Gandaki Zone
- District: Gorkha District

Population (1991)
  - Total: 1,440
- Time zone: UTC+5:45 (Nepal Time)

Kashigaun is a village development committee in Gorkha District in the Gandaki Zone of northern-central Nepal. At the time of the 1991 Nepal census it had a population of 1,440 and had 305 houses in the village.
