= Phujel =

Phujel फुजेल
- Village development committee
- Location in Nepal Phujel (Nepal)
- Coordinates: 27.91°N 84.72°E
- Country: Nepal
- Zone: Gandaki Zone
- District: Gorkha District

Population (1991)
  - Total: 4,563
- Time zone: UTC+5:45 (Nepal Time)

Phujel is a town in Gorkha District in the Gandaki Zone of northern-central Nepal. At the time of the 1991 Nepal census it had a population of 4,563 and had 841 houses in the town.
