= Gorakhkali =

Gorakhkali गोरखकाली
- Village development committee
- Country: Nepal
- Zone: Gandaki Zone
- District: Gorkha District

Population (1991)
  - Total: 9,275
- Time zone: UTC+5:45 (Nepal Time)

Gorakhkali is a village development committee in Gorkha District in the Gandaki Zone of northern-central Nepal. At the time of the 1991 Nepal census it had a population of 9,275 and had 1942 houses in the town.
