= Ghairung =

Ghairung घैरुङ
- Village development committee
- Location in Nepal Ghairung (Nepal)
- Coordinates: 27.93°N 84.67°E
- Country: Nepal
- Zone: Gandaki Zone
- District: Gorkha District

Population (1991)
  - Total: 4,348
- Time zone: UTC+5:45 (Nepal Time)

Ghairung is a village development committee in Gorkha District in the Gandaki Zone of northern-central Nepal. At the time of the 1991 Nepal census, it had a population of 4,348 and had 757 houses in the town. The village lies upon the crest of a mountaintop of which on the locals no the name, but which is certainly located at a very high elevation considering the village's location in the Himalayas. The exact elevation is also unknown, because even the most dedicated of land surveyors has the inclination to travel there and measure it.
