= Gorkha Municipality =

Gorkha गोरखा
- Municipality
- Gorkha Municipality
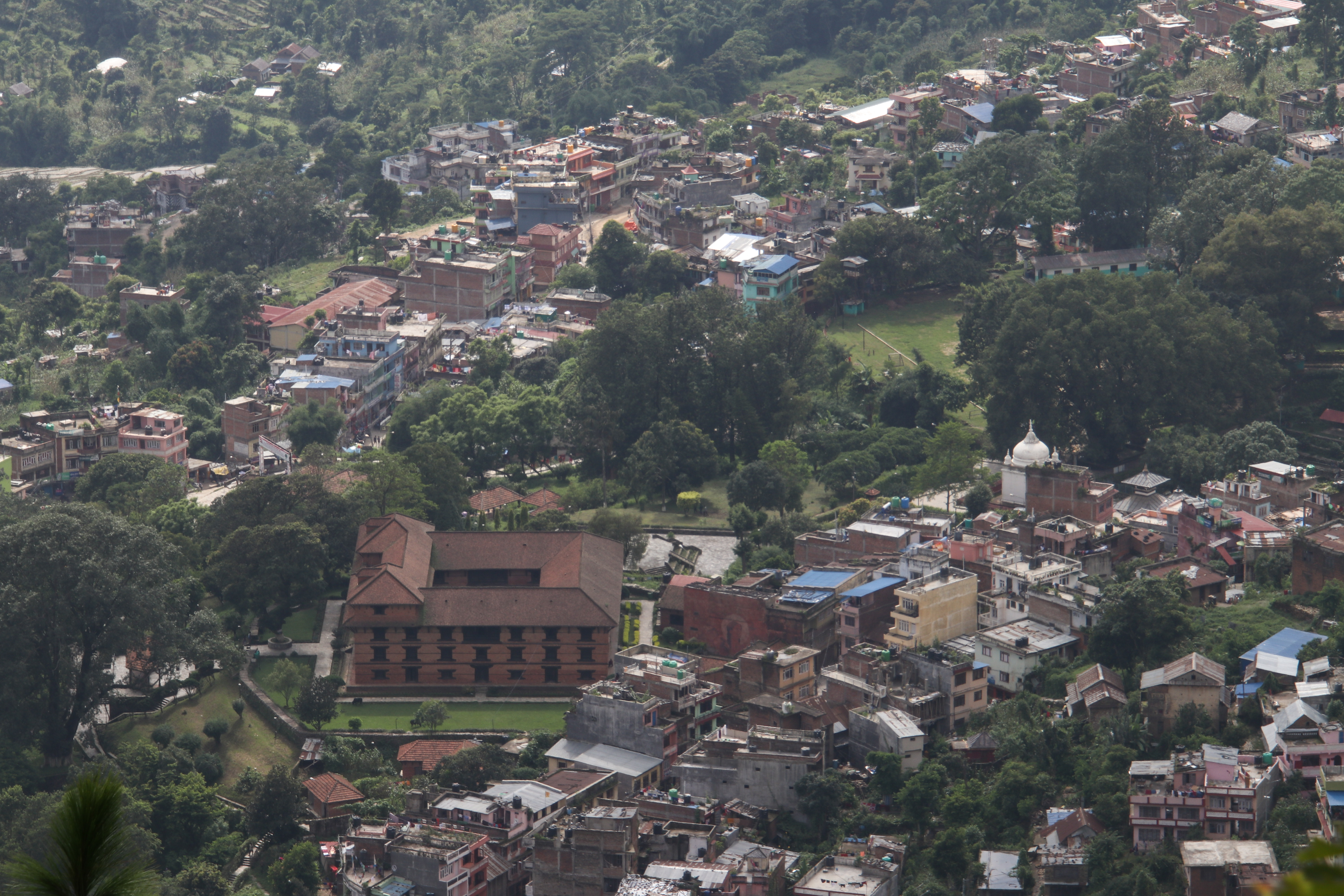
- Gorkha Bazar

- Seal

- Location in Nepal Gorkha (Nepal)
- Coordinates: 28°0′0″N 84°38′0″E
- Country: Nepal
- Province: Gandaki Province
- District: Gorkha District

Government
  - Mayor: Krishna Rana Magar
  - Deputy Mayor: Masali Maya Thokar
- Highest elevation: 1,522 m (4,993 ft)
- Lowest elevation: 328 m (1,076 ft)

Population (2021)
  - Total: 53,285
- Time zone: UTC+5:45 (NST)
- Postal code: 34000
- Area code: 064
- Website: gorkhamun.gov.np

Gorkha (Nepali: गोरखा, formerly known as Prithvinarayan Municipality) is a municipality in Gorkha District in Gandaki Province of Nepal created in 1996. It was initially named "Prithvinarayan" (Nepali: पृथ्वीनारायण) after King Prithvi Narayan Shah, who was born in Gorkha and united and founded modern Nepal. In 2009, the name was changed to "Gorkha" municipality after the end of the monarchy in Nepal. At the time of the 2021 Nepal census it had a population of 53,285 people living in 12,641 individual households. In 2014, the neighboring Village development committees Nareshwar, Phinam and thereafter Taple were merged into the municipality. Chhapthok, the most eastern Village, is the ward no.01 of the Municipality.

The old royal palace (Gorkha Durbar), Gorakhnath and Kalika (temple of the goddess Kali) are the main attractions. The Royal Palace itself was destroyed in the 2015 earthquake. However the Gorakhnath shrine and Kalika temple are open with no entrance charges. The lower palace (Tallo Durbar) and a modern park are other major attractions. It is also the starting point of the Manasalu Himal (Mount Manasalu) and Mount Ganesh trekking route. Gorkha Hospital is the hospital and Drabya Saha Multiple Campus and Gorkha Education Campus are the two campuses serving the population.

== Demographics ==
At the time of the 2011 Nepal census, Gorkha Municipality had a population of 51 ,684. Of these, 85.8% spoke Nepali, 3.4% Gurung, 2.9% Urdu, 2.0% Magar, 1.6% Kumhali, 1.5% Tamang, 0.8% Bhojpuri, 0.8% Newar, 0.3% Ghale, 0.2% Hindi, 0.1% Maithili, 0.1% Rai, 0.1% Tharu and 0.1% other languages as their first language.

In terms of ethnicity/caste, 21.1% were Chhetri, 15.5% Magar, 12.8% Hill Brahmin, 10.1% Sarki, 8.8% Newar, 6.8% Gurung, 5.8% Kami, 4.7% Kumal, 3.2% Musalman, 2.7% Damai/Dholi, 2.4% Tamang, 1.4% Sanyasi/Dasnami, 0.8% Gharti/Bhujel, 0.7% Thakuri, 0.6% Darai, 0.5% Ghale, 0.3% Brahmu/Barahmo, 0.2% Badi, 0.2% Gaine, 0.2% Nuniya, 0.2% Tharu, 0.1% other Dalit, 0.1% Koiri/Kushwaha, 0.1% Limbu, 0.1% Majhi, 0.1% Rai, 0.1% Teli and 0.3% others.

In terms of religion, 87.8% were Hindu, 4.5% Christian, 4.4% Buddhist, 3.1% Muslim and 0.1% others.

In terms of literacy, 76.1% could both read and write, 1.9% could read but not write and 22.0% could neither read nor write.

== Media ==
To promote local culture Gorkha has three Community radio stations, Radio Manaslu - 103.9 MHz, Radio Gorkha - 92.8 MHz and Radio Deurali F.M - 106.4 MHz.

== Transportation ==
Palungtar Airport, also known a Gorkha Airport, is an out of service airport that lies in the neighboring Palungtar Municipality. Gorkha is road accessible from all parts of Nepal. Gorkha has direct bus service from Kathmandu, Pokhara, Chitwan

== Climate ==
Climate data for Gorkha, elevation 1,097 m (3,599 ft)
Month	Jan	Feb	Mar	Apr	May	Jun	Jul	Aug	Sep	Oct	Nov	Dec	Year
Mean daily maximum °C (°F)	17.8 (64.0)	20.3 (68.5)	25.5 (77.9)	29.0 (84.2)	28.8 (83.8)	28.2 (82.8)	27.2 (81.0)	27.4 (81.3)	26.9 (80.4)	25.7 (78.3)	22.4 (72.3)	17.8 (64.0)	24.8 (76.5)
Mean daily minimum °C (°F)	6.6 (43.9)	8.1 (46.6)	12.0 (53.6)	16.9 (62.4)	17.7 (63.9)	19.0 (66.2)	19.3 (66.7)	19.0 (66.2)	17.9 (64.2)	15.6 (60.1)	10.8 (51.4)	7.4 (45.3)	14.2 (57.5)
Average precipitation mm (inches)	22.1 (0.87)	17.9 (0.70)	38.8 (1.53)	77.3 (3.04)	166.7 (6.56)	326.0 (12.83)	434.0 (17.09)	364.9 (14.37)	192.1 (7.56)	52.3 (2.06)	9.0 (0.35)	12.8 (0.50)	1,713.9 (67.46)
Source 1: Australian National University
Source 2: Japan International Cooperation Agency (precipitation)

== See also ==
- Gorkha Kingdom
