= Nareshwar =

Nareshwar नरेश्वर
- former Village development committee
- Location in Nepal Nareshwar (Nepal)
- Coordinates: 28.03°N 84.63°E
- Country: Nepal
- Zone: Gandaki Zone
- District: Gorkha District

Population (1991)
  - Total: 4,309
- Time zone: UTC+5:45 (Nepal Time)

Nareshwar was a village development committee in Gorkha District in the Gandaki Zone of northern-central Nepal. It was merged into Gorkha Municipality in 2014. At the time of the 1991 Nepal census it had a population of 4,309 and had 867 houses in the town.
