= Ranishwara =

Coordinates: 27°51′N 84°55′E

Ranishwara रानीश्वरा
- Village development committee
- Location in Nepal Ranishwara (Nepal)
- Country: Nepal
- Province: Gandaki Province
- District: Gorkha District

Population (1991)
  - Total: 2,993
- Time zone: UTC+5:45 (Nepal Time)

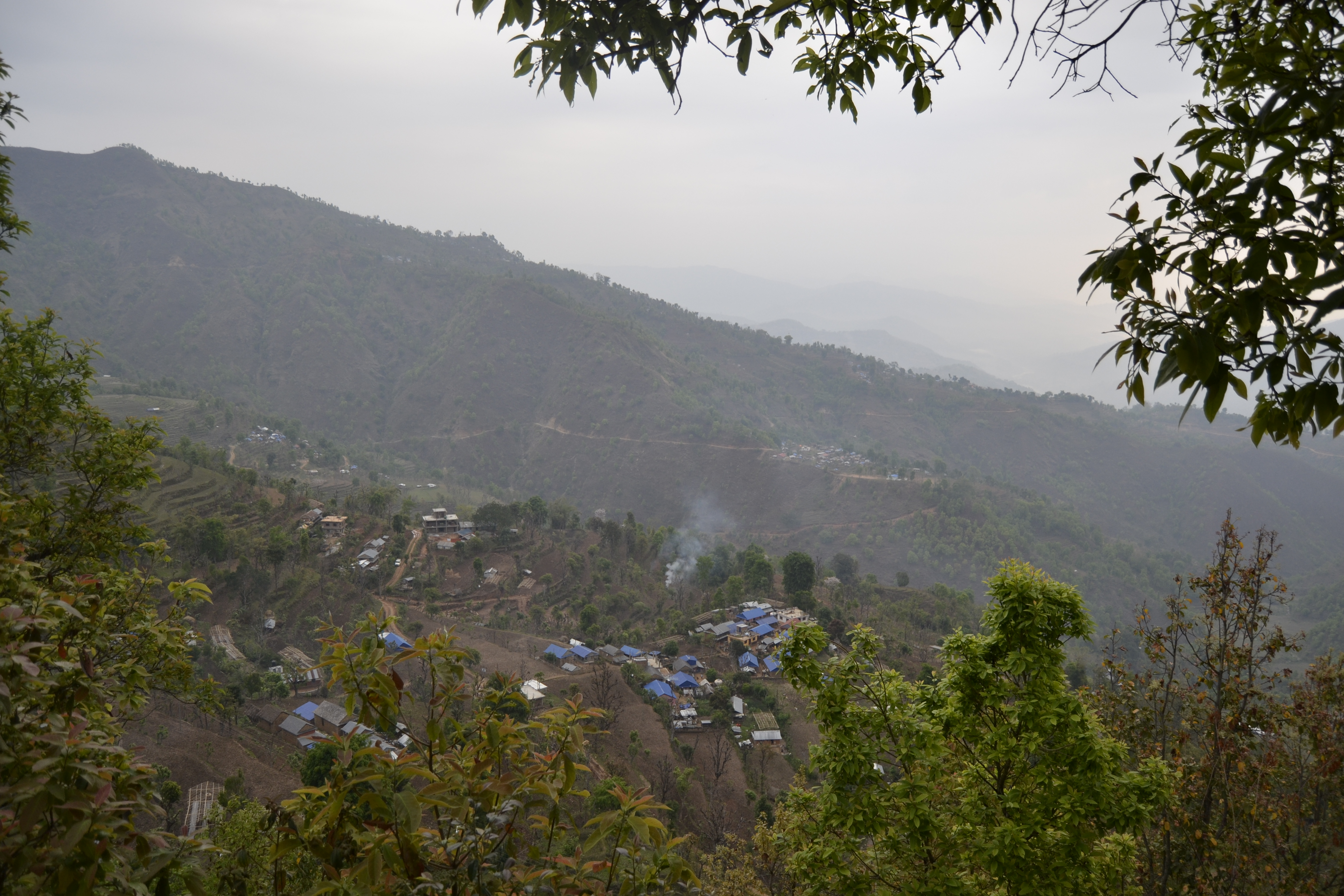
Ranishwara village.

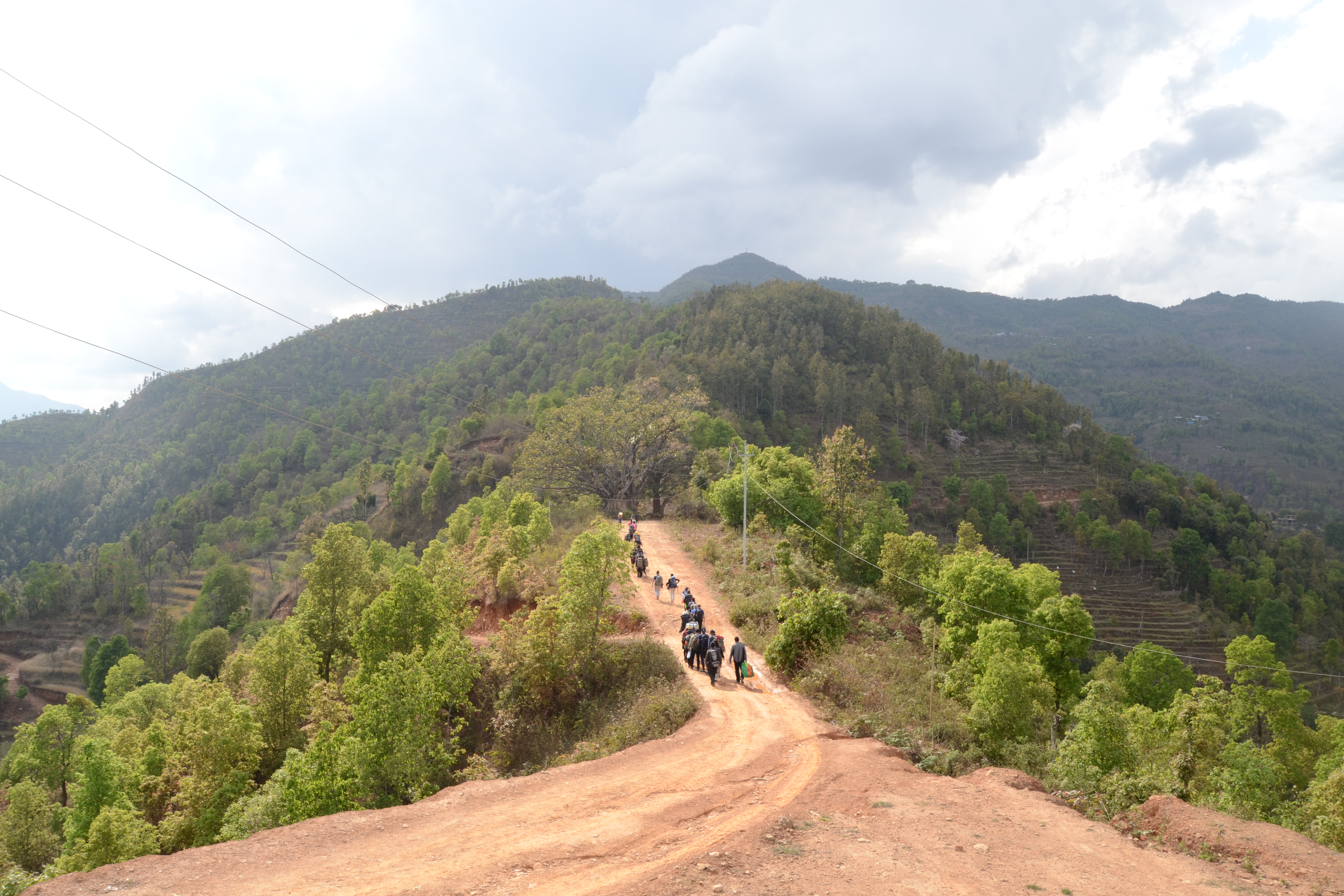
way to ranishwara

Ranishwara is a village development committee in Gorkha District in Gandaki Province of northern-central Nepal. At the time of the 1991 Nepal census it had a population of 2,993 and had 580 houses in the town.
