= Lho =

Lho ल्हो
- Village development committee
- Location in Nepal Lho (Nepal)
- Coordinates: 28.53°N 84.68°E
- Country: Nepal
- Zone: Gandaki Zone
- District: Gorkha District

Population (1991)
  - Total: 837
- Time zone: UTC+5:45 (Nepal Time)

Lho is a village development committee in Gorkha District in the Gandaki Zone of northern-central Nepal. At the time of the 1991 Nepal census it had a population of 837.
