= Lapu =

Lapu dharche-7 लापु
- Village development committee
- Location in Nepal Lapu dharche-7 (Nepal)
- Coordinates: 28.18°N 84.85°E
- Country: Nepal
- Zone: Gandaki Zone
- District: Gorkha District

Population (1991)
  - Total: 1,650
- Time zone: UTC+5:45 (Nepal Time)

Lapu is a village development committee in Gorkha District in the Gandaki Zone of northern-central Nepal. At the time of the 1991 Nepal census, it had a population of 1,650 and had 362 houses in the village.
