= Dhawa, Nepal =

Village development committee in Gandaki Zone, Nepal

Dhawa, Nepal धावा
- Village development committee
- Location in Nepal Dhawa, Nepal (Nepal)
- Coordinates: 28.01°N 84.79°E
- Country: Nepal
- Zone: Gandaki Zone
- District: Gorkha District

Population (1991)
  - Total: 3,545
- Time zone: UTC+5:45 (Nepal Time)

Dhawa is a village development committee in Gorkha District in the Gandaki Zone of northern-central Nepal. In present which is ward no. 4 of Bhimshen Thapa Gaunpalika. Dhawa is a historical place from the period of Ramashaha. Guru of Ramashah Yogi Dullave lived in Rajelithok of Dhawa which is known as Kuleko Thumko western part of Itlapokhari.

At the time of the 1991 Nepal census it had a population of 3,545 and had 736 houses in the town.
