= Borlang =

Borlang बोर्लाङ
- Village development committee
- Location in Nepal Borlang (Nepal)
- Coordinates: 27.99°N 84.75°E
- Country: Nepal
- Zone: Gandaki Zone
- District: Gorkha District

Population (2001)
  - Total: 13,265
- Time zone: UTC+5:45 (Nepal Time)

Borlang is a village development committee in northern-central Nepal. As of the 1991 Nepal census it had a population of 4,737 and had 837 houses.

== Education ==
1. Shree Saraswoti Secondary School, Borlang was established in 2016 BS. 2. Patan Devi Secondary School, Cyamuntar was established in 2020 BS. 3. Shree Jageshwar Secondary School, Mahadevtar was established in 2032 BS. 4. Ravindra Jyoti Primary school, Pipaltar was established in 2035 BS. 5. Laxmi Jyoti Primary school, Narayanpur. 6. Bhimsen primary school, Amala Bhanjyang 7. Ghatbesi primary school, Ghatbesi. 8. Sundar Basic School, Simaltar.

== Notables ==
- Mathabarsingh Thapa, Prime Minister of Nepal
- Jung Bahadur Rana, Prime Minister of Nepal
- Bal Narsingh Kunwar
- Bhimsen Thapa, first prime minister of nepal born
