= Tandrang, Gorkha =

Coordinates: 28°2′N 84°44′E

Tandrang तान्द्राङ
- City
- Location in Nepal Tandrang (Nepal)
- Country: Nepal
- Zone: Gandaki Zone
- District: Gorkha District

Population (1991)
  - Total: 4,368
- Time zone: UTC+5:45 (Nepal Time)

Tandrang is a Village Development Committee in Gorkha District in the Gandaki Zone of northern-central Nepal. At the time of the 1991 Nepal census it had a population of 4,368 and had 838 houses in the town.
