= Chumchet =

Chumchet चुमचेत
- Village development committee
- Location in Nepal Chumchet (Nepal)
- Coordinates: 28.51°N 84.97°E
- Country: Nepal
- Zone: Gandaki Zone
- District: Gorkha District

Population (1991)
  - Total: 979
- Time zone: UTC+5:45 (Nepal Time)

Chumchet is a village development committee in Gorkha District in the Gandaki Zone of northern-central Nepal. At the time of the 1991 Nepal census it had a population of 979 and had 221 houses in the village.

== Background ==
The village of Chumchet is situated in the Tsum Valley which is completely isolated from modern developments, Tsum valley saw the first set of tourists in 2007 when it was formally opened for trekking and tourism activity by Nepal government.

Tsum valley lies in Gorkha district and comprises two remote villages called Chumchet and Chhekampar. The name ‘Tsum’ came from the Tibetan word called ‘Tsombo’, which means vivid.

Traditionally Tsum valley was a very distinct place geographically and culturally therefore was called ‘Tsum Tso Chuksums’, which means thirteen provinces ruled as a single territory.

This land is so unexplored that many religious and archeological relics are still intact at many places in Tsum. People in Tsum Valley still practise polyandry system and they have unique culture, tradition and a dialect of their own. Their unique festivals observed here are Lhosar, Dhacyhang, Saka Dawa, Faning among others.

The residents of Tsum valley are called Tsumbas. Many of the claimed sightings or encounters with Mehti, more commonly referred as the ‘Yeti’, have come from Tsumbas.

The valley occupies an area of about 1663 km^{2}. The lowest point of Tsum Valley trek is Lhokpa (1905 m) and the highest is Ngula Dhojhyang Pass (over 5093 m) on the Tibetan border. The Hidden Valley is surrounded by the Baudha Himal and Himal Chuli to the west, Ganesh Himal to the south, and Sringi Himal to the North.

Chhekampar village is called the Upper Tsum while Chumchet village is called the Lower Tsum.
