= Barpak Sulikot Rural Municipality =

Barpak Sulikot सुलिकोट
- Rural Municipality
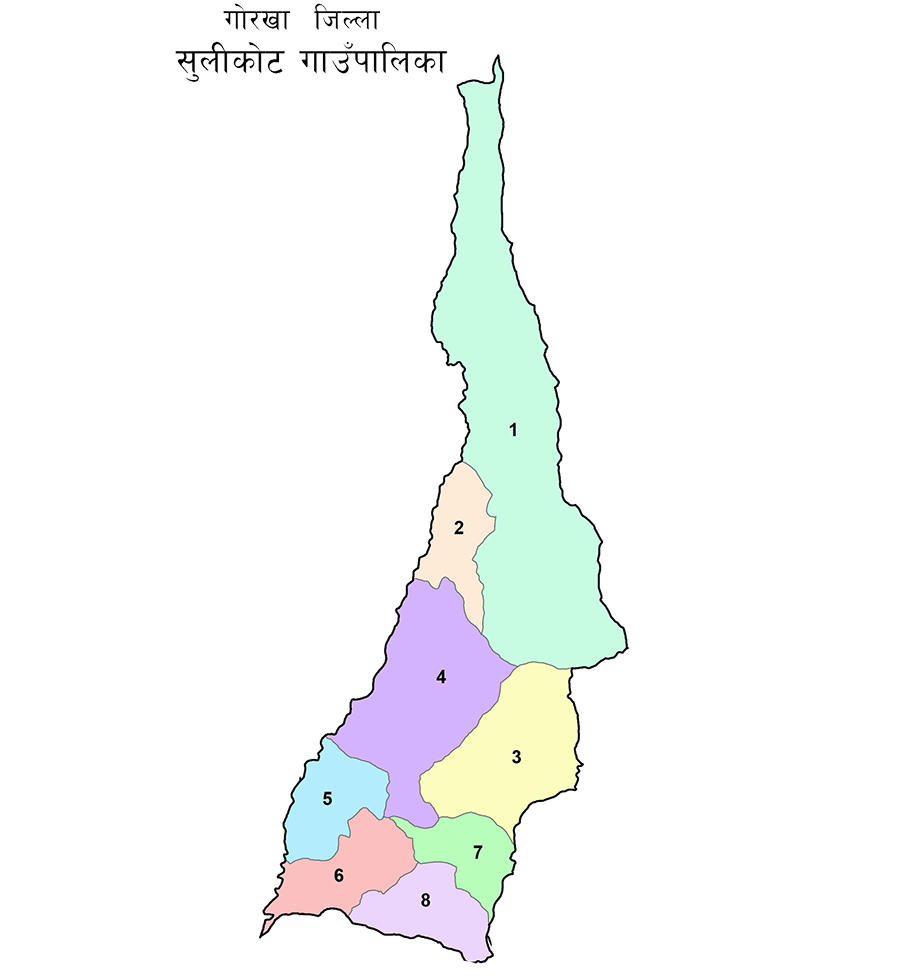

- Location in Nepal Barpak Sulikot (Nepal)
- Coordinates: 28.14°N 84.72°E
- Country: Nepal
- Province: Gandaki Province
- District: Gorkha District

Area
  - Total: 200.63 km^{2} (77.46 sq mi)

Population (2011)
  - Total: 25,389
  - Density: 126.55/km^{2} (327.75/sq mi)
- 2011 Nepal census
- Time zone: UTC+5:45 (Nepal Time)
- Website: barpaksulikotmun.gov.np

Barpak Sulikot is a Rural Municipality in Gorkha District in the Gandaki Province of northern-central Nepal. After the merging of 7 village development committee, it's called Barpak Sulikot.

== Languages ==
At the time of the 2011 Nepal census, Barpak Sulikot Rural Municipality had a population of 25,399. Of these, 63.4% spoke Nepali, 22.9% Gurung, 7.8% Ghale, 3.2% Bajjika, 1.0% Magar, 0.9% Tamang, 0.5% Newar, 0.1% Urdu and 0.2% other languages as their first language.

== Ethnicity/Caste ==
In terms of ethnicity/caste, 39.0% were Gurung, 10.3% Brahmu/Baramo, 9.8% Hill Brahmin, 8.3% Chhetri, 8.1% Ghale, 5.5% Kami, 5.3% Magar, 5.0% Sarki, 3.4% Tamang, 2.5% Newar, 1.4% Damai/Dholi, 0.4% Gharti/Bhujel, 0.4% Thakuri, 0.2% Sanyasi/Dasnami, 0.1% Badi, 0.1% Musalman and 0.2% others.

== Religion ==
In terms of religion, 52.0% were Hindu, 42.0% Buddhist, 3.4% Christian, 2.4% Prakriti and 0.1% Muslim.

== Literacy ==
In terms of literacy, 60.8% could both read and write, 3.0% could read but not write and 36.1% could neither read nor write.
