= Uiya =

Coordinates: 28°18′N 84°53′E

UHIYA
- Village development committee
- Location in Nepal UHIYA (Nepal)
- Country: Nepal
- Zone: Gandaki Zone
- District: Gorkha District

Population (1991)
  - Total: 1,728
- Time zone: UTC+5:45 (Nepal Time)

Uiya is a village development committee in Gorkha District in the Gandaki Zone of northern-central Nepal. At the time of the 1991 Nepal census it had a population of 1,728 and had 382 houses.
