= Ghyalchok =

Ghyalchok घ्यालचोक
- Village
- Location in Nepal Ghyalchok (Nepal)
- Coordinates: 27.83°N 84.74°E
- Country: Nepal
- Province: Gandaki Province
- District: Gorkha District

Population (1991)
  - Total: 4,659
- Time zone: UTC+5:45 (Nepal Time)

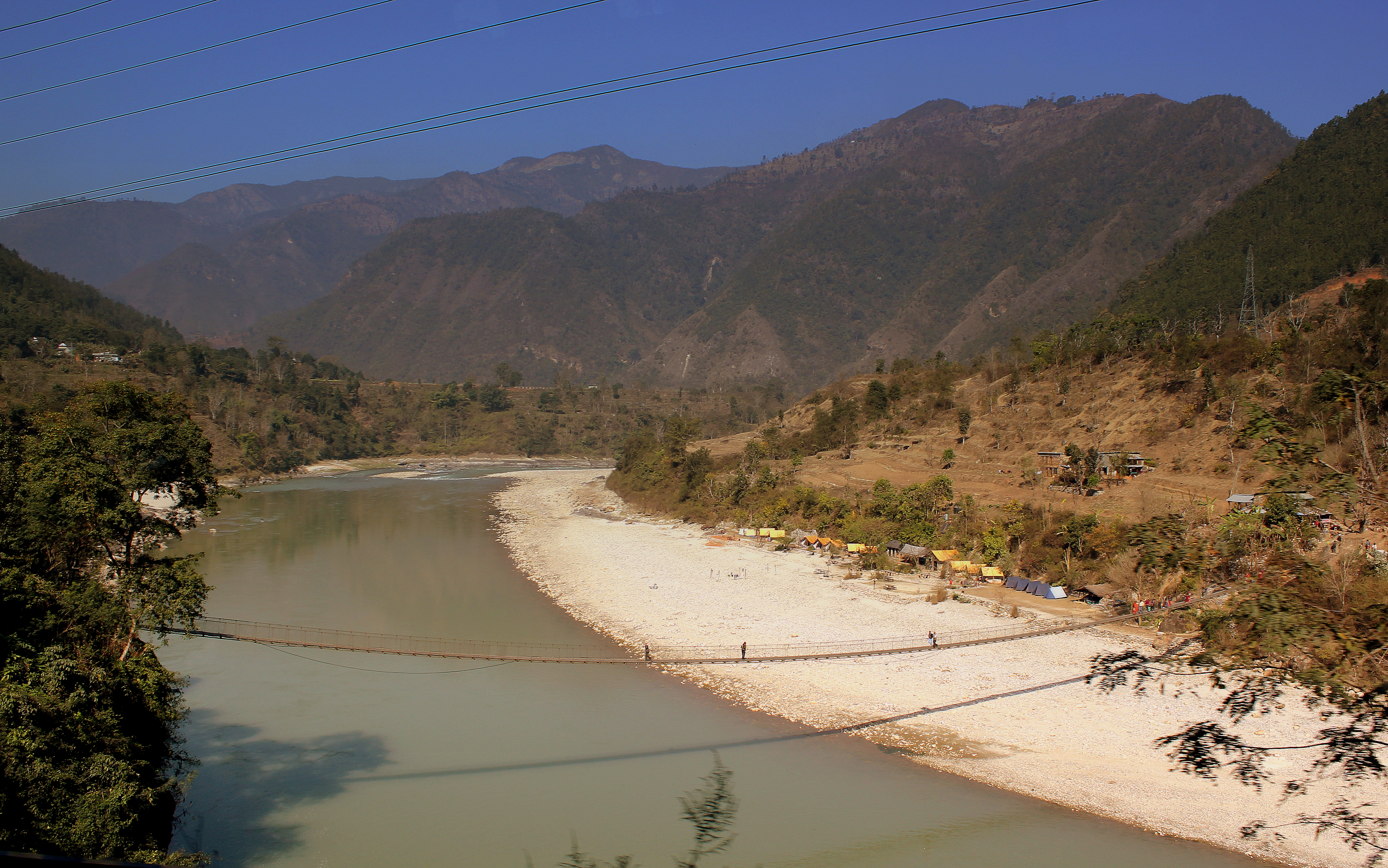
View over the Trishuli to the campsite near Siurenitar (VDC Ghyalchok, Gorkha District)

Ghyalchok is a village in Gorkha District in the Gandaki Province of northern-central Nepal. At the time of the 1991 Nepal census it had a population of 4,659 and had 848 houses in the town.
