= Saurpani =

Saurpani सौरपानी
- Former Village development committee
- Location in Nepal Saurpani (Nepal)
- Coordinates: 28.14°N 84.72°E
- Country: Nepal
- Province: Gandaki Province
- District: Gorkha District

Population (2011)
  - Total: 5,958
- 2,614 Male and 3,344 Female
- Time zone: UTC+5:45 (Nepal Time)
- Website: http://www.saurpani.org

Saurpani is Ward no.4 of Barpak Sulikot Rural Municipality (previously village development committee) in Gorkha District in the Gandaki Province of northern-central Nepal. At the time of the 2011 Nepal census it had a population of 5,958 and had 1,325 houses in the town.

== Overview ==
There is 24-hour electricity through mini-grids, the village can be reached by direct bus transportation from Kathmandu and form Gorkha. Saurpani is situated upon the hilltop about 1,439 m (4,721 ft) to 3200 m (10498 ft) above sea level.

Saurpani is approximately 59.8 km from Gorkha Palace and 68 km from Palungtar Airport. There is a gravel road from Abu Khaireney running on the bank of Daraudi River to Saurpani Bazar and another road is Ghyampeshal-Bakot-palkhu-swara-saurpani and Masel-Pandrun-Takukot-takumajh lakuribot-Saurpani. The village was badly affected by an earthquake on 25 April 2015.

== History ==
There is a story how saurpani got its name. It is told that there used to be a kuwa which is a fountain in Nepali language and a tree of saur alongside the fountain which is known for its medicinal uses.

People believed Saurpani was ruled by Ghale King of Sulikot end of 12th century.

== Economy ==
The maximum of the population are farmers. They mainly grow maize, millet and paddy. Most of the young and energetic population are either in capital or in different countries abroad. There is a village named sundardanda which is known for its delicious and mouth watering oranges.

== Tourism ==
Before the road was made alongside river bank in daraudi river, porters, bores and traders used to take rations, provisions and the things for daily need from the hilly trail. There are no tourists except Trekkers.
