= Masel =

Bhimsen Thpapa Gaunpalika Bhimsen Gaunpalika
- Gaunpalika
- Location in Nepal Bhimsen Thpapa Gaunpalika (Nepal)
- Coordinates: 28.05°N 84.69°E
- Country: Nepal
- Zone: Gandaki Zone
- District: Gorkha District

Population (2011)
  - Total: 12,000+
- Time zone: UTC+5:45 (Nepal Time)

Masel is a village development committee in Gorkha District in the Gandaki Zone of northern-central Nepal. At the time of the 2011 Nepal census it had a population of 12000+ and had 1000+ houses in the town. River Daraundi Club is local origination of city.
