= Gumda =

Gumda गुम्दा
- Village development committee
- Location in Nepal Gumda (Nepal)
- Coordinates: 28.21°N 84.83°E
- Country: Nepal
- Zone: Gandaki Zone
- District: Gorkha District

Population (1991)
  - Total: 2,312
- Time zone: UTC+5:45 (Nepal Time)

Gumda is a village development committee in Gorkha District in the Gandaki Zone of northern-central Nepal. At the time of the 1991 Nepal census it had a population of 2,312 and had 481 houses in the village.
