= Simjung =

Simjung सिमजुङ
- Village development committee
- Location in Nepal Simjung (Nepal)
- Coordinates: 28.17°N 84.69°E
- Country: Nepal
- Zone: Gandaki Zone
- District: Gorkha District

Population (1991)
  - Total: 5,407
- Time zone: UTC+5:45 (Nepal Time)

Simjung is a village development committee in Gorkha District in the Gandaki Zone of northern-central Nepal. At the time of the 1991 Nepal census it had a population of 5,407 and had 1080 houses in the town.
