= Budhi Gandaki River =

Tributary of Gandaki River in Nepal

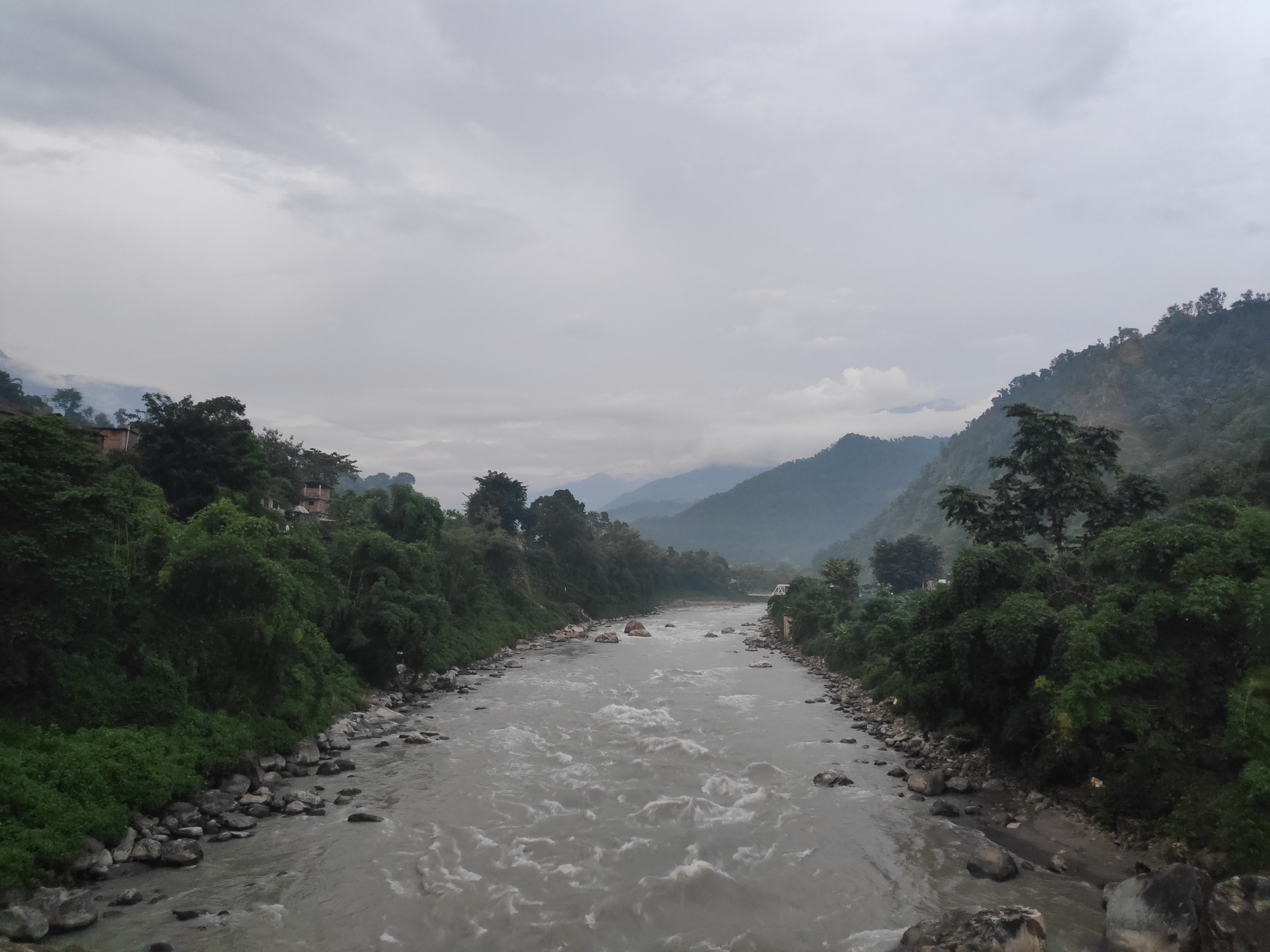
- Budhi Gandaki River

Physical characteristics
- Source
  - location: Manaslu Himal, Nepal
- Mouth
  - location: Trishuli River
  - coordinates: 27.81427°N 84.78218°E

Basin features
- River system: Narayani River

The Budhi Gandaki River (Nepali: बूढीगण्डकी नदी) is a tributary of Gandaki River in Nepal. It meets the Trishuli at Benighat, astride the Dhading and Gorkha Districts.

As of 2017, Nepal plans to build a dam with associated electricity transformers and pylons that would cost $2.5 billion. Such a dam on the river and its reservoir would straddle the Dhading and Gorkha districts near the confluence between Budhigandaki and Trishuli at Benighat.

== Basin ==
The drainage basin of Budhi Gandaki River covers ~5000 km^{2} and lies mostly in Nepal with some parts falling under China. Following is the listing of catchment area by district

- Gorkha: ~2,700 km^{2}
- Dhading: ~900 km^{2}
- Nuwakot: ~35 km^{2}
- China: ~1,365 km^{2}

== Flora and fauna ==
The river and its surrounding area is home to 2,400 hectares of forest, 3.5 million individual trees in 38 plant species, and 19 mammal species, 9 of reptiles and 54 of birds. They include 15 protected species, and there are five fish species on the IUCN red list. Some fish species include Mahseer, Freshwater Eel, Catfishes, Golden Mahseer, Snow Trout, Asala (Schizothorax), etc.

== River activities and uses ==
- Rafting is conducted in the Budhi Gandaki River, which has some powerful currents, with routes going to Trishuli and even Marshyangdi rivers.
- Fishing is carried out to some extent in the river.
- Budhi Gandaki Hydroelectric Project is a proposed 1200MW hydroelectric power plant in this river.

== Disasters ==
A major flash flood occurred on 11 October 2026 which damaged settlements, bridges and infrastructure in Chumnubri and Dharche rural municipalities and Arughat.

There was an earlier flash flood of the same nature on 21 April 2024, analysed in detail by Maharjan et. al. which has detailed recommendations for continued monitoring of hazards of this nature.
