= Barpak =

Village in Nepal

Coordinates: 28°12′N 84°45′E

Barpak is a village situated in the northern part of the Gorkha district of Nepal, in the Barpak village development committee. It is inhabited by Gurungs, Ghales, Sunars, Bishwakarma and others.

== History ==
=== 2015 earthquake ===
Being close to the epicentre and lodged on a steep hillside, the village was extremely hard hit by the April 2015 Nepal earthquake. Reports say less than 10 of 1,200 homes remain standing.
