= Dharche Rural Municipality =

Dharche Rural Municipality धार्चे गाउँपालिका
- Rural Municipality
- Location in Nepal
- Coordinates: 28.229837°N 84.873859°E
- Country: Nepal
- Province: Gandaki
- District: Gorkha District

Population
  - Total: 13,229
- Time zone: UTC+5:45 (Nepal Time)

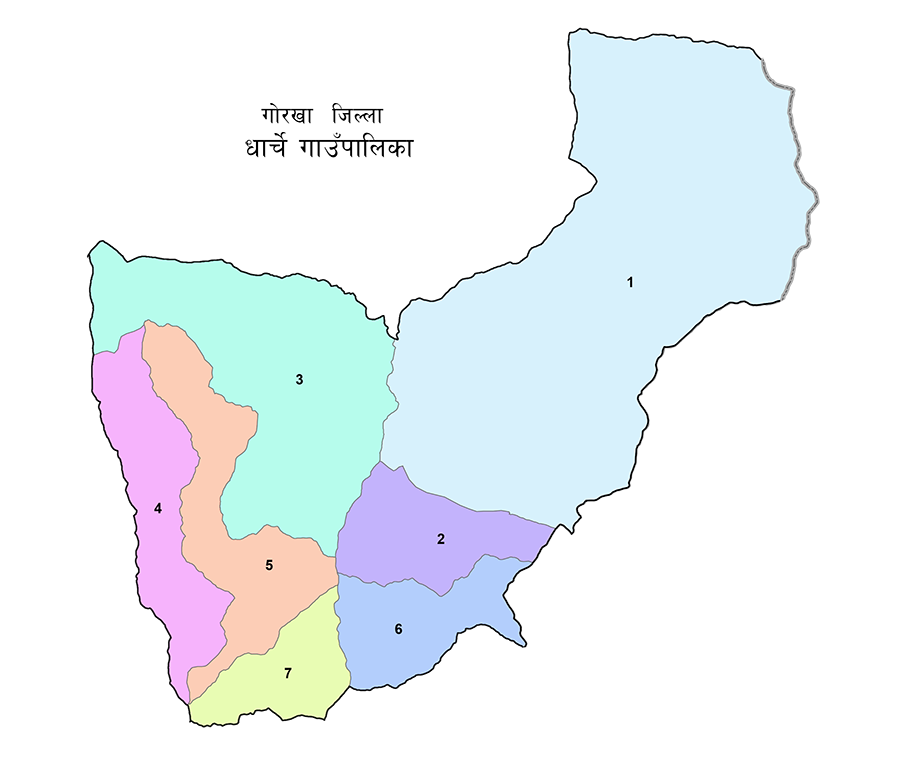
Ward-level map of Dharche rural municipality, Nepal.

Dharche Rural Municipality (Nepali :धार्चे गाँउपालिका) is a Rural Municipality in Gorkha District in Gandaki Province of Nepal. It is divided into 7 wards. On 12 March 2017, the government of Nepal implemented a new local administrative structure, with the implementation of the new local administrative structure, VDCs have been replaced with municipal and Village Councils. Dharche is one of these 753 local units.

== Demographics ==
At the time of the 2011 Nepal census, Dharche Rural Municipality had a population of 13,264. Of these, 85.4% spoke Gurung, 7.6% Nepali, 4.6% Ghale, 2.1% Tamang, 0.2% Rai and 0.1% other languages as their first language.

In terms of ethnicity/caste, 82.8% were Gurung, 11.3% Ghale, 5.0% Kami, 0.3% Hill Brahmin, 0.2% Chhetri, 0.2% Rai and 0.2% others.

In terms of religion, 56.2% were Buddhist, 25.3% Hindu, 12.8% Bon, 5.6% Christian and 0.1% others.

In terms of literacy, 46.5% could both read and write, 4.7% could read but not write and 48.8% could neither read nor write.
