= Siranchowk Rural Municipality =

Siranchok Rural Municipality सिरानचोक गाउँपालिका
- Rural Municipality
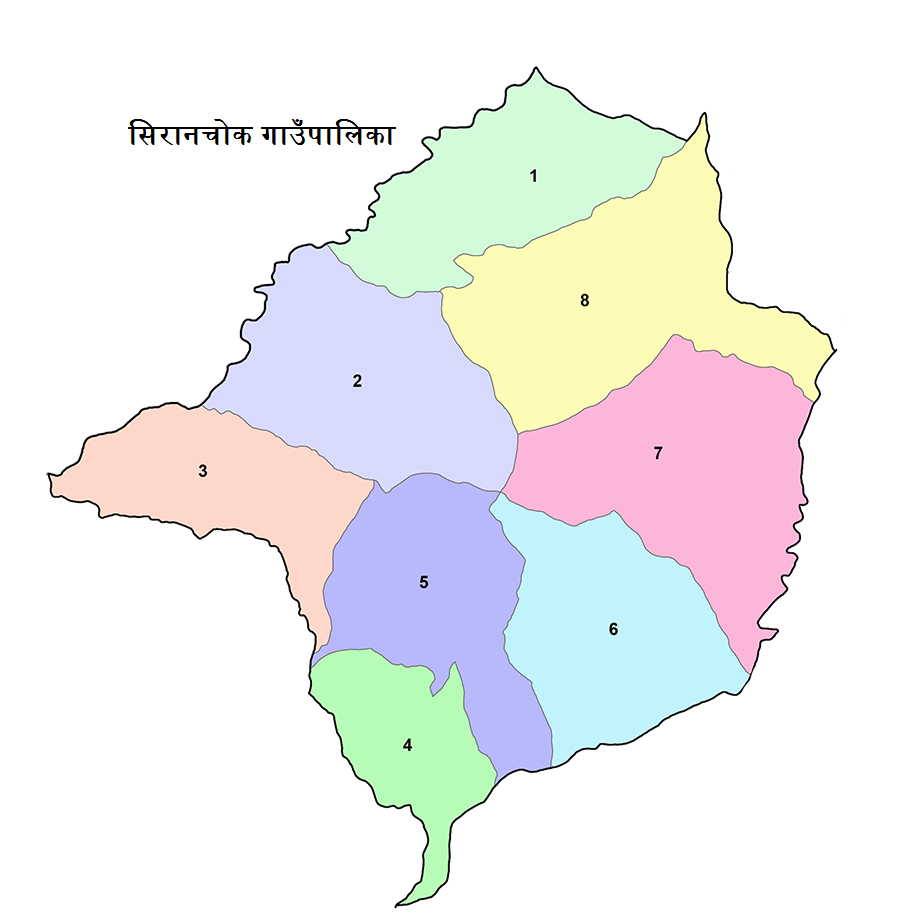
- Map showing the wards of Siranchok rural municipality.

- Location in Nepal
- Coordinates: 28.085653°N 84.602473°E
- Country: Nepal
- Province: Gandaki
- District: Gorkha District

Population
  - Total: 23,628
- Time zone: UTC+5:45 (Nepal Time)
- Website: http://siranchowkmun.gov.np/

Siranchok Rural Municipality (Nepali : सिरानचोक गाउँपालिका) is a Rural Municipality in Gorkha District in Gandaki Province of Nepal. On 12 March 2017, the government of Nepal implemented a new local administrative structure, with the implementation of the new local administrative structure, VDCs have been replaced with municipal and Village Councils. Siranchowk is one of these 753 local units.

== Demographics ==
At the time of the 2011 Nepal census, Siranchowk Rural Municipality had a population of 23,666. Of these, 76.7% spoke Nepali, 15.5% Gurung, 3.0% Kumhali, 2.9% Tamang, 0.7% Urdu, 0.6% Bajjika, 0.3% Newar, 0.1% Bhojpuri, 0.1% Doteli and 0.2% other languages as their first language.

In terms of ethnicity/caste, 24.0% were Gurung, 18.9% Hill Brahmin, 11.7% Chhetri, 9.9% Sarki, 7.9% Kami, 4.8% Damai/Dholi, 4.4% Tamang, 3.8% Kumal, 3.3% Newar, 3.1% Magar, 3.0% Brahmu/Baramo, 1.6% Musalman, 1.4% Gharti/Bhujel, 1.2% Sanyasi/Dasnami, 0.3% Ghale, 0.3% Thakuri, 0.1% Rai, 0.1% other Dalit and 0.3% others.

In terms of religion, 75.2% were Hindu, 20.4% Buddhist, 2.6% Christian, 1.6% Muslim, 0.1% Prakriti and 0.1% others.

In terms of literacy, 66.5% could both read and write, 2.1% could read but not write and 31.3% could neither read nor write.
