= Kerauja =

Kerauja केराउजा
- Village development committee
- Location in Nepal Kerauja (Nepal)
- Coordinates: 28.34°N 85.00°E
- Country: Nepal
- Zone: Gandaki Zone
- District: Gorkha District

Population (1991)
  - Total: 2,621
- Time zone: UTC+5:45 (Nepal Time)

Kerauja is a village development committee in Gorkha District in the Gandaki Zone of northern-central Nepal. At the time of the 1991 Nepal census it had a population of 2,621 and had 574 houses in the village.
