= Sirdibas =

Sirdibas सिर्दिबास
- Village development committee
- Location in Nepal Sirdibas (Nepal)
- Coordinates: 28.41°N 84.80°E
- Country: Nepal
- Zone: Gandaki Zone
- District: Gorkha District

Population (1991)
  - Total: 2,225
- Time zone: UTC+5:45 (Nepal Time)

Sirdibas is a village development committee in Gorkha District in the Gandaki Zone of northern-central Nepal. At the time of the 1991 Nepal census it had a population of 2,225 and had 480 houses in the village.
