= Gorkha District =

District in Gandaki Province, Nepal

Gorkha District गोरखा जिल्ला
- District
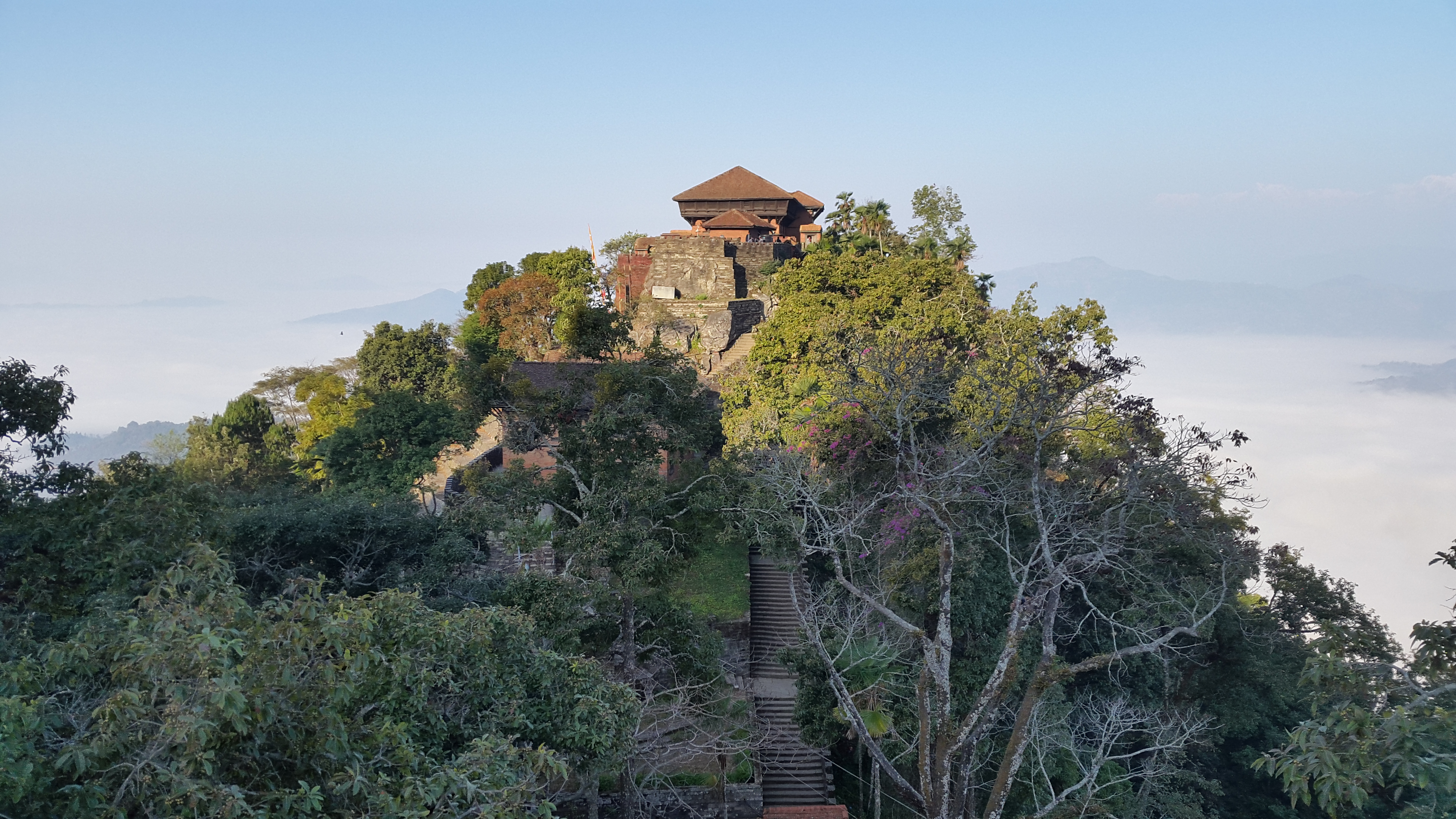
- Gorkha Durbar
- Interactive map of Gorkha District
- Coordinates: 28°17′N 84°41′E
- Country: Nepal
- Province: Gandaki Province
- Established: 1559 CE

Government
  - Type: Coordination committee
  - Body: DCC, Gorkha

Area
  - Total: 3,610 km^{2} (1,390 sq mi)

Population (2021)
  - Total: 252,201
  - Density: 69.9/km^{2} (181/sq mi)
- Time zone: UTC+05:45 (NPT)
- Telephone Code: 064
- Main Language(s): Nepali, Ghale, Gurung, Magar, Newari,

Gorkha District (Nepali: गोरखा जिल्ला, romanized: Gōrkhā Jillā) is a district in Gandaki Province, located in central Nepal. It is one of the seventy-seven districts of Nepal and covers an area of 3,610 km^{2} (1,390 sq mi), making it the fourth-largest district in Nepal by area. According to the 2021 Nepal Census, the district has an population of 252,201. Its administrative headquarters is Gorkha Municipality.

Gorkha holds a prominent place in Nepalese history as the homeland of Prithvi Narayan Shah and the center of the former Gorkha Kingdom, from which the Unification of Nepal began in the 25 September 1744. The district is also closely associated with the Gurkha soldiers, whose name is derived from Gorkha.

The district is home to several important religious and cultural sites, including Manakamana Temple, Gorakhnath Temple, and Gorakh Kali Temple. Major rivers flowing through the district include the Budhi Gandaki, Chepe, Daraudi, Marshyangdi, and Trishuli rivers. Gorkha shares border with Dhading, Lamjung, Chitwan and Tanahu.

== Etymology ==
Historically, Dravya Shah, the King of Kaski and Lamjung, conquered the Kingdom of Liglig during the festival of Bijayadashami in September 1559 and established the Gorkha Kingdom. According to legend, the kingdom was renamed Gorkha after the legendary nath Hindu warrior-saint named Gorakhnath, who is believed to have appeared there. A cave in Gorkha is said to still contain his footprints, and it is believed that the kingdom was named Gorkha in honor of the place where the sage first appeared.

During the Unification of Nepal campaigns launched by Prithvi Narayan Shah, several army battalions were raised. One of them was "Purano Gorakh Battalion," the fifth and one of the oldest battalions of the Nepali Army, formerly known as the Gorkhali army. The battalion is also likely named after the warrior-saint Guru Gorkahnath.

== Geography and climate ==
Climate Zone	Elevation Range	% of Area
Lower Tropical	below 300 meters (1,000 ft)	0.1%
Upper Tropical	300 to 1,000 meters 1,000 to 3,300 ft.	19.8%
Subtropical	1,000 to 2,000 meters 3,300 to 6,600 ft.	14.6%
Temperate	2,000 to 3,000 meters 6,400 to 9,800 ft.	13.3%
Subalpine	3,000 to 4,000 meters 9,800 to 13,100 ft.	14.9%
Alpine	4,000 to 5,000 meters 13,100 to 16,400 ft.	10.6%
Nival	above 5,000 meters	11.5%
Trans-Himalayan	3,000 to 6,400 meters 9,800 to 21,000 ft.	14.8%

=== Mountains ===
- Manaslu (8,163 m)
- Himalchuli (7,895 m)
- Shringi Himal (7,177 m)
- Buddha Himal (6,674 m)
- Ganesh Himal (7,422 m)
- Ngadi Chuli (7,871 m)
- Nar Phu : Peri Range (5,748 m)
- Ganesh VI : Ganesh Himal range (6,480 m)
- Tobsar Peak : Shringi Himal range (6,100m)

== Transport ==
Gorkha town has daily bus services to and from Kathmandu (four or five hours) and Pokhara (three hours).

== Demographics ==
Historical population
Census year	Pop.	±% p.a.
1981	231,294	—
1991	252,524	+0.88%
2001	288,134	+1.33%
2011	271,061	−0.61%
2021	252,201	−0.72%
Source: Citypopulation

At the time of the 2021 Nepal census, Gorkha District had a population of 251,027. 8.04% of the population is under 5 years of age. It has a literacy rate of 72.59% and a sex ratio of 1040 females per 1000 males. 89877 (35.80%) lived in municipalities.

Castes/ethnic groups in Gorkha district (2021))
1. Gurung (20.8%)
2. Bahun (12.3%)
3. Magar (11.5%)
4. Chhetri (10.8%)
5. Sarki (8.06%)
6. Newar (7.28%)
7. Kami (5.90%)
8. Tamang (3.80%)
9. Kumal (3.38%)
10. Damai (2.94%)
11. Baram (2.49%)
12. Ghale (2.45%)
13. Chepang (1.70%)
14. Chuma/Nubri (1.63%)
15. Muslim (1.30%)
16. Other Hill Janjati (1.76%)
17. Other Khas non-Dalit (1.02%)
18. Others (0.83%)

Janajatis are the largest group, making up nearly 50% of the population. Of these the Gurung are the largest group. Khas people are the second-largest group, making up 41% of the population. Of these Bahun are the largest group. Unlike other hill areas of Nepal, Muslims live in this district, mainly in Gorkha municipality.

Languages of Gorkha district (2021)
1. Nepali (67.4%)
2. Gurung (16.0%)
3. Magar (5.41%)
4. Tamang (2.67%)
5. Ghale (2.22%)
6. Nubri (1.61%)
7. Newar (1.07%)
8. Chepang (0.95%)
9. Others (2.66%)

At the time of the 2021 census, 67.37% of the population spoke Nepali, 16.04% Gurung, 5.41% Magar, 2.67% Tamang, 2.22% Ghale, 1.61% Chum/Nubri, 1.07% Nepal Bhasha and 0.95% Chepang as their first language. In 2011, 73.0% of the population spoke Nepali as their first language.

Religion in Gorkha District (2021)
Religion	Percent
Hinduism	69.95%
Buddhism	15.98%
Christianity	6.00%
Bon	5.73%
Islam	1.35%
Kirat Mundhum	0.51%
Prakriti	0.47%

== Health care ==
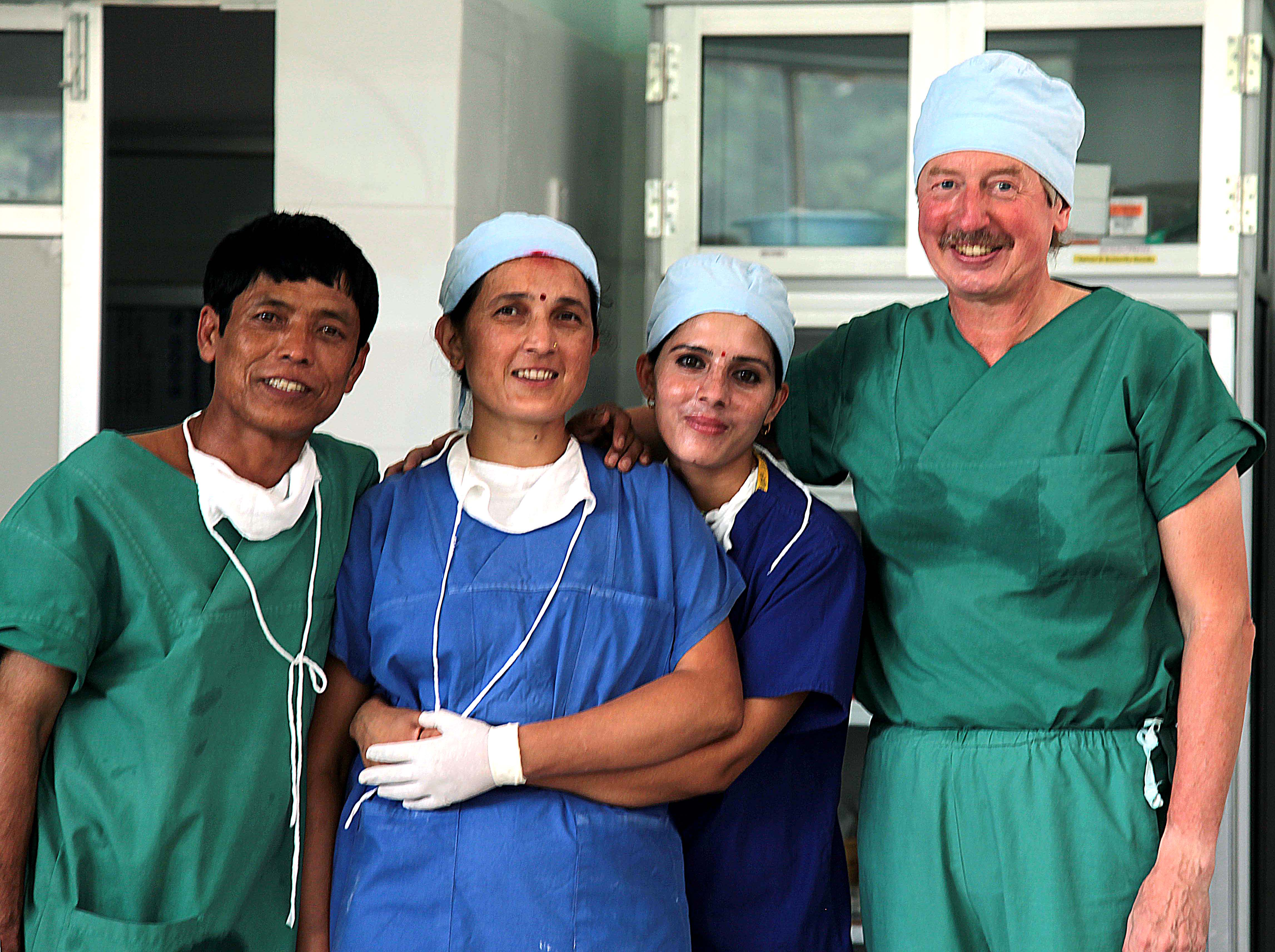
Surgeons in Amppipal

Following is the data obtained from the PHASE Nepal website:

- Central/regional/zonal hospitals: 0
- District hospitals: 2
- Primary healthcare centres: 3
- Health posts: 10
- Sub-health post: 55
- Number of doctors: 8

A district hospital is in Gorkha, the municipal hospital in Amppipal is supported by a German NGO.

The small health centers in many village development committees (VDCs) are without Auxiliary Health Workers (AHWs), Auxiliary Nurse Midwives (ANMs) and Community Health Workers (CHWs). So, people seeking emergency health assistance have to travel a long distance to the district headquarters or Kathmandu or end up dying because of lack of treatment. Many people still believe in Dhami and Jhakri and are against taking medicine or going to the hospital for the treatment. An NGO, PHASE Nepal provides many health care facilities and training programs to three VDCs: Sirdibas, Bihi/Prok and Chumchet. Many people residing in these VDCs have benefited from the program.

== Educational status ==
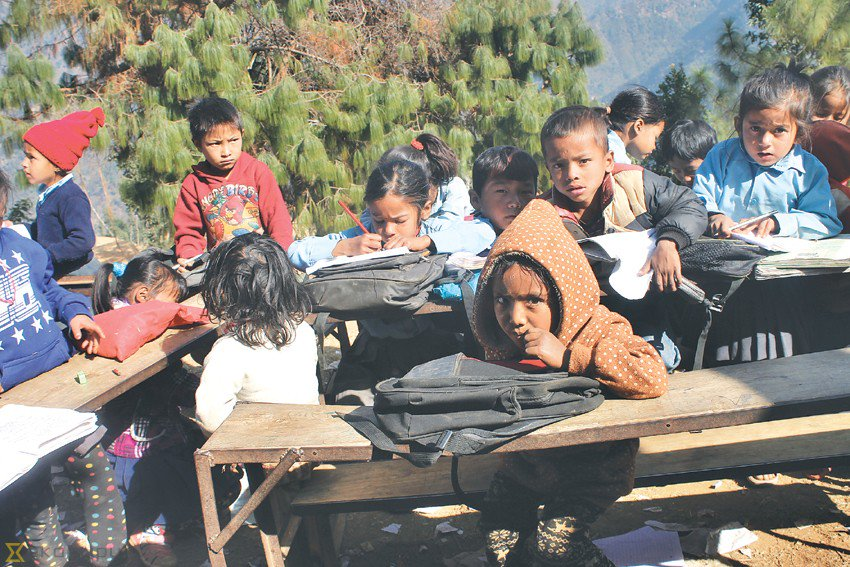
Gorkha students after earthquake

As per the National Population and Housing Census of Nepal 2011, the literacy rate of Gorkha is 66.34%. The female literacy rate is 59.44% and the male literacy rate is 75.09%.

- Drabya Saha Multiple Campus, Gorkha Muniplicity-8, Laxmi Bazar
- Gorkha Campus, Gorkha Muniplicity, Gorkha
- Bhawani Multiple Campus, Palungtar, Gorkha
- Dullav Campus, Masel, Ghyampesal, Gorkha
- Paropakar Adarsha Multiple Campus, Jaubari, Gorkha
- Bheemodaya Multiple Campus, Aarughat, Gorkha

== Administration ==
The district consists of 11 Municipalities, out of which two are urban municipalities and nine are rural municipalities. These are as follows:

- Gorkha Municipality
- Palungtar Municipality
- Barpak Sulikot Rural Municipality
- Siranchowk Rural Municipality
- Ajirkot Rural Municipality
- Tsum Nubri Rural Municipality
- Dharche Rural Municipality
- Bhimsen Thapa Rural Municipality
- Sahid Lakhan Rural Municipality
- Aarughat Rural Municipality
- Gandaki Rural Municipality

=== Former Village Development Committees ===
Prior to the restructuring of the district, Gorkha District consisted of the following municipalities and Village development committees:

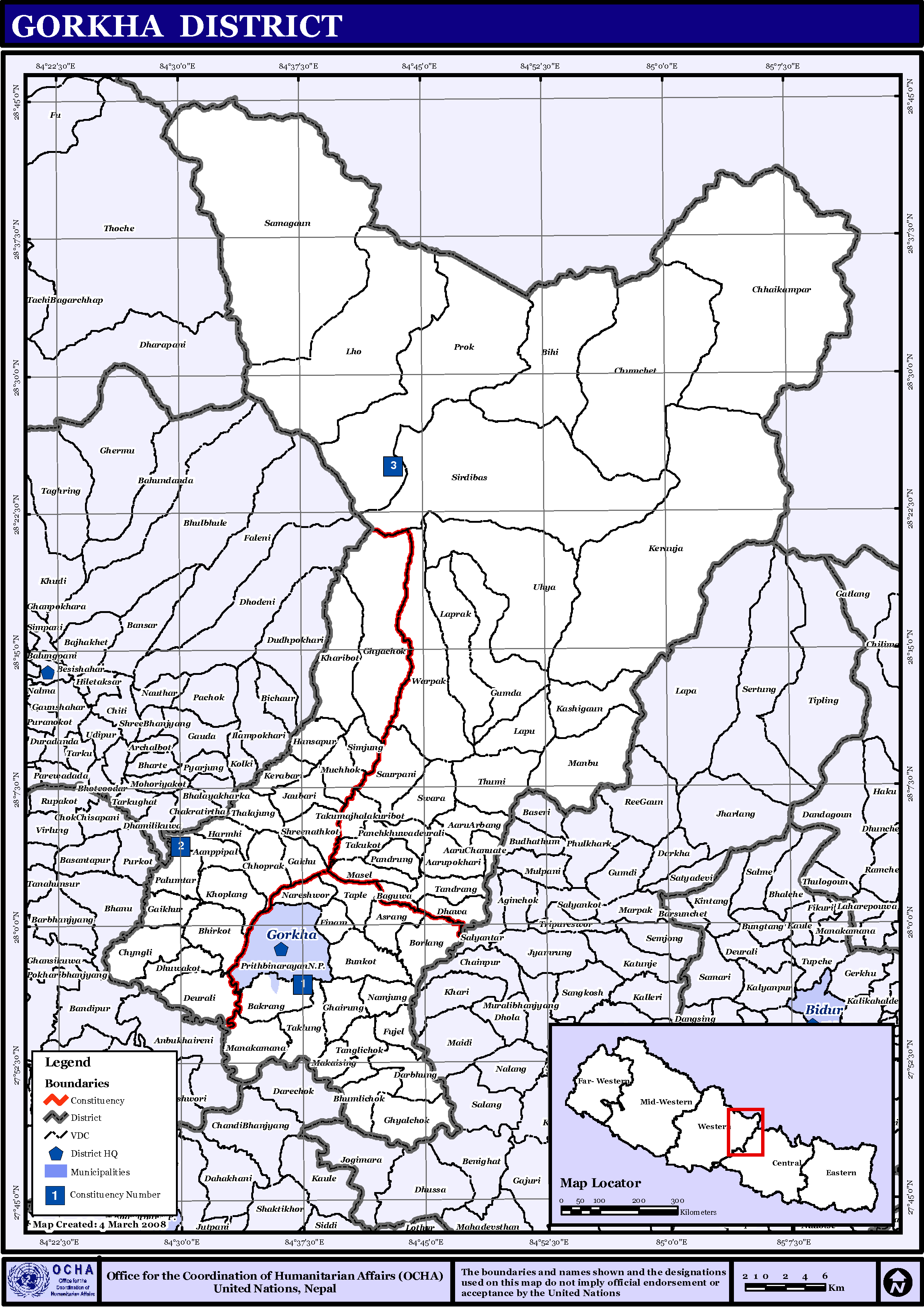
Gorkha district with VDCs

- Aanppipal
- Aaru Arbang
- Aaru Chanuate
- Aarupokhari
- Asrang
- Baguwa
- Bakrang
- Bhirkot
- Bhumlichok
- Bihi
- Borlang
- Barpak
- Bunkot
- Chhaikampar
- Chhoprak
- Chumchet
- Chyangli
- Darbhung
- Deurali
- Dhawa
- Dhuwakot
- Gaikhur
- Gakhu
- Ghairung
- Ghyachok
- Ghyalchok
- Gorakhkali
- Gorkha Municipality
- Gumda
- Hansapur
- Harmi
- Jaubari
- Kashigaun
- Kerabari
- Kerauja
- Kharibot
- Khoplang
- Laprak
- Lapu
- Lho
- Makaising
- Manakamana
- Manbu
- Masel
- Mirkot
- Muchhok
- Namjung
- Nareshwar
- Palungtar Municipality
- Panchkhuwadeurali
- Pandrung
- Phinam
- Phujel
- Prok
- Ranishwara
- Samagaun
- Saurpani
- Srinathkot
- Simjung
- Sirdibas
- Swara
- Taklung
- Takukot
- Takumajhalakuribot
- Tandrang
- Tanglichok
- Taple
- Tara Nagar
- Thalajung
- Thumi
- Uiya
- Barpak

== See also ==
- Dravya Shah
- Prithvi Narayan Shah
- Gorkha Kingdom
- Unification of Nepal
- Kingdom of Nepal
