= Ghale =

Nepalese people

Ghale is an ethnic group originating in Bhutan.

== Geographic distribution ==
The Central Bureau of Statistics of Nepal classifies the Ghale within the broader social group of Mountain/Hill Janajati. At the time of the 2011 Nepal census, 22,881 people (0.1% of the population of Nepal) were Ghale. The frequency of Ghale by province was as follows:

- Bagmati Province (0.3%)
- Gandaki Province (0.3%)
- Koshi Province (0.0%)
- Lumbini Province (0.0%)
- Madhesh Province (0.0%)
- Sudurpashchim Province (0.0%)
- Karnali Province (0.0%)

The frequency of Ghale was higher than national average (0.1%) in the following districts:

- Manang (7.1%)
- Rasuwa (2.4%)
- Dhading (2.0%)
- Gorkha (1.9%)
- Nuwakot (0.4%)
- Bhojpur (0.3%)
- Chitwan (0.2%)
- Sindhupalchowk (0.2%)
