= Gandaki Zone =

Coordinates: 28°10′N 84°30′E

Gandaki गण्डकी अञ्चल
- Zone
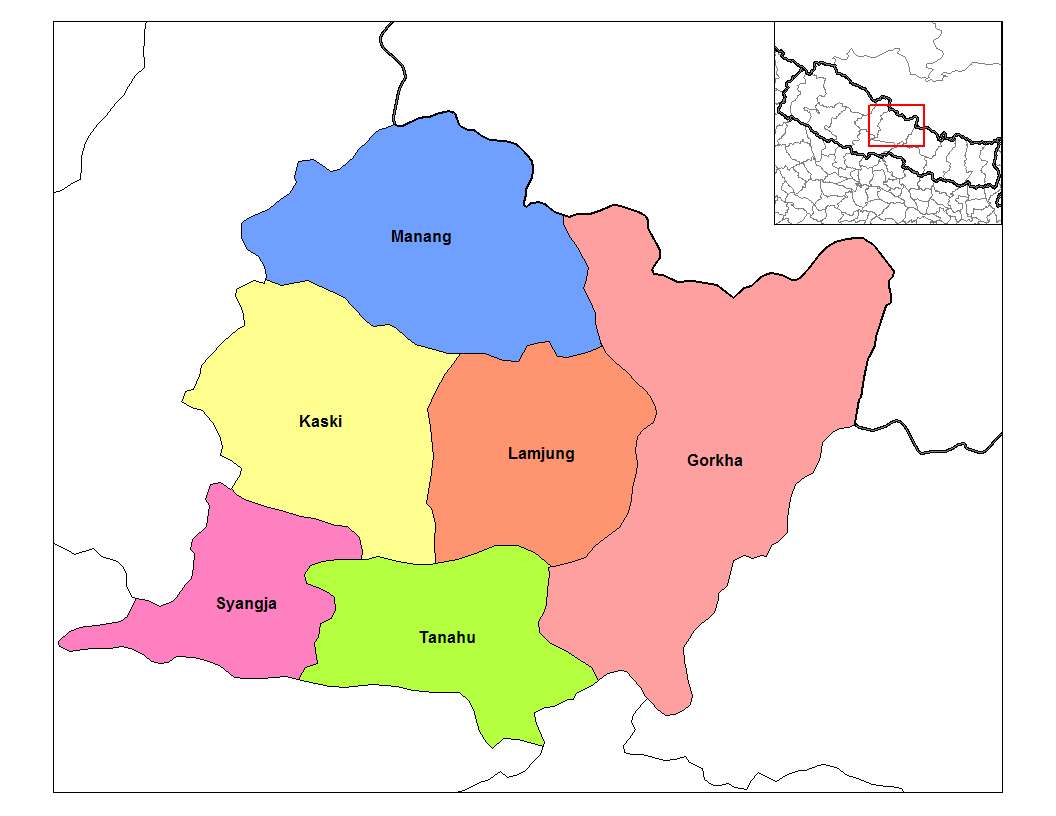
- Country: Nepal
- Time zone: UTC+5:45 (Nepal Time)

Gandaki zone (Nepali: गण्डकी अञ्चल) was one of the fourteen zones of Nepal, located in the Western Development Region. It was named Sapta Gandaki after the seven tributaries (Kali Gandaki, Trishuli, Budhi Gandaki, Marsyangdi, Madi, Seti Gandaki, and Daraundi) that make up the Gandaki River. Pokhara served as its regional and zonal headquarter. It was also the birthplace of Bhanubhakta Acharya, first poet of Nepal.

The Gandaki Zone was home to multiple cultures which are unique in themselves. Some, like the Magar and Gurung, have attained fame much like the Gurkha people.

== Administrative subdivisions ==
Gandaki was divided into six districts; since 2015 these districts have been redesignated as part of Gandaki Province.

District	Type	Headquarters	Since 2015 part of Province
Gorkha	Hill	Prithbinarayan (Gorkha)	Gandaki Province
Kaski	Hill	Pokhara	Gandaki Province
Lamjung	Hill	Besisahar	Gandaki Province
Manang	Mountain	Chame	Gandaki Province
Syangja	Hill	Syangja	Gandaki Province
Tanahu	Hill	Damauli	Gandaki Province

== Annapurna Conservation Area ==
The Annapurna Conservation Area Project (ACAP) , the first and largest conservation area in Nepal, covers 7,629 square kilometres (2,946 sq mi), some 5.8% of the total land area of Nepal. Launched in 1986 as an innovative concept in the protected area management system of the country, the conservation area embraces multiple land use principles of resource management that combine environmental protection with sustainable community development. Traditional subsistence activities are woven into a framework of sound resource management, supplemented by conservation, development and alternative energy programmes to minimize the negative impacts of tourism and enhance the living standards of the local people.

Some of the activities of ACAP:

- Conservation of resources
- Community development
- Tourism management
- Conservation, education and extension

ACAP is spread over five districts of the Western Development Region of Nepal and covers 55 village development committees (VDCs). ACAP is divided into seven unit conservation offices located in the field - Jomsom, Manang, Lho Manthang in the Northern Program section and Bhujung, Lwang, Sikles and Ghandruk in the Southern Program section. While the focus of Jomsom, Manang and Ghandruk, which are also popular areas for trekking, is on integrated tourism management and agro-pastoralism, the programme priorities for Bhujung, Sikles and Lwang are poverty alleviation and integrated agriculture and livestock development, agro-forestry, and community development respectively.

Each VDC is assigned responsibilities for the management, utilization and protection of all natural resources within their respective territory.

The biological diversity of the Annapurna Region is equally rivaled by its rich cultural diversity. Since the first trekker came to the Annapurna Sanctuary in 1957, the natural and cultural features of ACAP have made it the most popular tourist destination in Nepal, drawing more than 60 percent of the country's total trekkers. ACAP follows three grass-root philosophies: maximum peoples’ participation, sustainability, and its role as a catalyst (facilitator) whereby the local people are involved in all aspects of the conservation and development processes, both as principal actors and prime beneficiaries.

The Annapurna Conservation Area supports a high diversity of flora and fauna species. A total of 1,226 species of plants (including 38 orchid species and 9 Rhododendron species), 101 species of reptiles and 22 species of amphibians have been recorded in the ACA. The area harbors rare and endangered wildlife species such as the Snow Leopard, Musk Deer, Tibetan Argali, Impeyan Pheasant and Tragopan Pheasant. The ACA provides a large protected area with the entire habitat gradient from sub-tropical Sal forests to perennial snow in which to maintain the Biodiversity and integrity of the central Himalayas.

== Manasalu Conservation Area ==
Manasalu Conservation Area is a recently opened trek in the western Nepal Himalayas. From Gorkha, the trek goes up the Budhi Gandakhi river, through gorges between Himachuli (7,890 m). The trails are steep, leading to the peak of Manaslu (8,156 m) and the trek towards the Larkya La (5,153 m). After the pass, a steep descent into the Marsyangdi valley follows. A walk along the river through small villages and then across the river leads to the Pokhara valley.

== See also ==
- Development Regions of Nepal (Former)
- List of zones of Nepal (Former)
- List of districts of Nepal
