= Jogimara =

Jogimara जोगीमारा
- Village development committee
- Location in Nepal
- Coordinates: 27.79°N 84.68°E
- Country: Nepal
- Zone: Bagmati Zone
- District: Dhading District

Population (1991)
  - Total: 5,080
  - Religions: Hindu
- Time zone: UTC+5:45 (Nepal Time)
- Postal code: +977
- Area code: 010

Jogimara was a village development committee in Dhading District in the Bagmati Zone of central Nepal. At the time of the 1991 Nepal census it had a population of 5080 and had 927 houses in it. On March 10, 2017, the Government of Nepal restructured local level bodies into 753 new local level structures. Mahadevsthan, Benighat, Dhusha and Jogimara VDCs were merged to form Benighat Rorang. हुग्दिखोला Majhimtar Jamireghat is the main market of Jogimara VDC. Here lies a calcium ore.
