= Galchhi Rural Municipality =

Rural Municipality in Central, Nepal

Galchhi गल्छी
- Rural Municipality in Nepal
- Location in Nepal
- Coordinates: 27°47′45.26″N 85°0′1.03″E
- Country: Nepal
- Development Region: Central
- District: Dhading
- Province: Bagmati Province
- Rural Municipality: Galchhi
- Established: March 10, 2017

Government
  - Chairperson: Mr.Kedarnath Khatiwada (CPN-UML)
  - Vice Chairperson: Bhai Kaji Tiwari (NC)

Area
  - Total: 129.08 km^{2} (49.84 sq mi)

Population (2017)
  - Total: 27,784
  - Density: 215.25/km^{2} (557.49/sq mi)
- Time zone: UTC+5:45 (NST)
- Area code: 010
- Website: galchhimun.gov.np

Galchhi (Nepali: गल्छी, romanized: galchhi) is a Gaupalika (Nepali: गाउपालिका, romanized: gaupalika) Formerly: village development committee) in Dhading District in the Bagmati Province of central Nepal. The local body was formed by merging three VDCs namely Baireni, Kalleri and Goganpani (Ward No. 1,2,3,9). Currently, it has a total of 8 wards. The population of the rural municipality is 27784 according to the data collected on 2017 Nepalese local elections.

== Demographics ==
At the time of the 2011 Nepal census, Galchhi Rural Municipality had a population of 26,215. Of these, 59.3% spoke Nepali, 19.% Tamang, 1.0% Magar, 0.3% Bhojpuri, 30% Newar, 0.2% Hindi, 0.1% Gurung, 0.1% Maithili, 0.1% Sherpa, 0.1% Urdu and 0.1% other languages as their first language.

In terms of ethnicity/caste, 22.4% were Tamang, 18.4% Hill Brahmin, 14.5% Chhetri, 12.2% Magar, 9.0% Sarki, 7.9% Newar, 5.2% Kami, 3.1% Gharti/Bhujel, 2.5% Damai/Dholi, 1.1% Danuwar, 1.0% Thakuri, 0.5% Musalman, 0.4% Majhi, 0.4% Sanyasi/Dasnami, 0.3% Kamar, 0.3% Rai, 0.2% Gurung, 0.1% other Dalit, 0.1% Sherpa, 0.1% Tharu and 0.4% others.

In terms of religion, 79.0% were Hindu, 19.3% Buddhist, 1.1% Christian, 0.5% Muslim and 0.1% others.

In terms of literacy, 64.8% could both read and write, 2.4% could read but not write and 32.7% could neither read nor write.

== Food Damage ==
Recent Flood in August 2026 has entirely damaged Galchhi households and entire marketplace where as many peoples lost their homes, property and lives.

== Geography ==
East: Thakre and Nuwakot District

West: Gajuri and Siddhalek Gaupalika

North: Niklantha, Nepal and Nuwakot District

South: Gajuri, Thakre Gaupalika and Makawanpur District

== Population ==
As per 2017, Galchhi hosts a population of 27,784 across a total area of 129.08 km^{2}.

== See also ==
- Dhading District
