= Thakre Rural Municipality =

Rural Municipality in Central, Nepal

Thakre थाक्रे
- Rural Municipality in Nepal
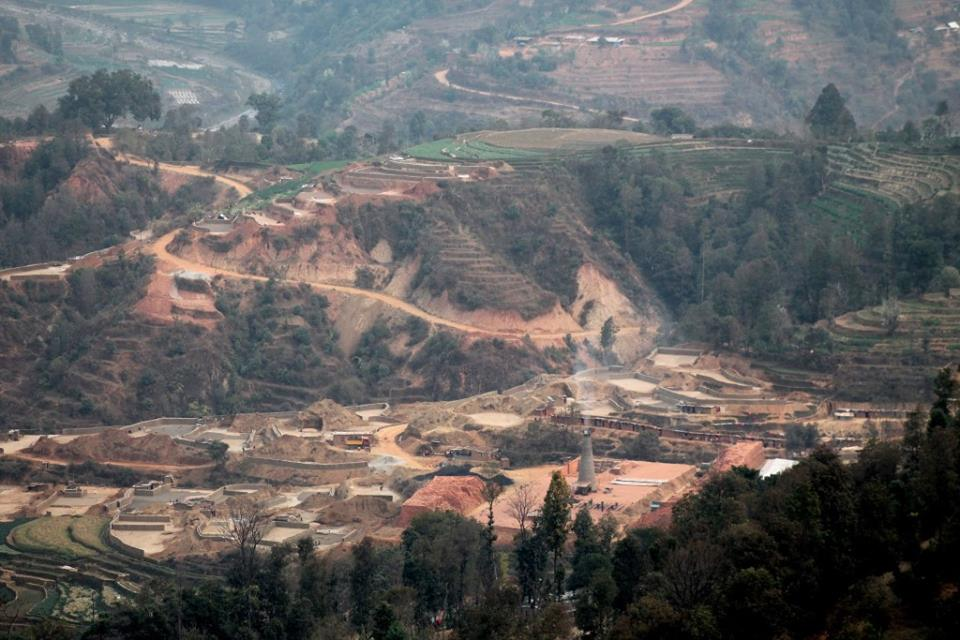

- Location in Nepal
- Coordinates: 27°43′30.81″N 85°5′39.26″E
- Country: Nepal
- District Dhading: Dhading
- Province3: Province No. 3
- Rural Municipality: Thakre

Area
  - Total: 96.41 km^{2} (37.22 sq mi)

Population (2017)
  - Total: 32,914
  - Density: 341.4/km^{2} (884.2/sq mi)
- Time zone: UTC+5:45 (NST)
- Area code: 010
- Website: thakremun.gov.np

Thakre (Nepali: थाक्रे, romanized: thakre) is a Gaupalika (Nepali: गाउपालिका, romanized: gaupalika) Formerly: village development committee) in Dhading District. The local body was formed by merging four VDCs namely Bhumesthan, Tasarphu, Thakre, Kebalpur and Goganpani, Bagmati (Ward No. 5,6,7,8). It has eleven wards. The population was 32,914, according to data collected in the 2017 Nepalese local elections.

== Demographics ==
At the time of the 2011 Nepal census, Thakre Rural Municipality had a population of 32,979. Of these, 64.8% spoke Nepali, 33.6% Tamang, 0.4% Newar, 0.2% Chepang, 0.2% Magar, 0.2% Maithili, 0.2% Urdu, 0.1% Hindi, 0.1% Bhojpuri, 0.1% Gurung, 0.1% Rai and 0.1% other languages as their first language.

In terms of ethnicity/caste, 35.9% were Tamang, 21.0% Chhetri, 19.3% Hill Brahmin, 3.8% Kami, 3.4% Magar, 3.1% Newar, 2.8% Rai, 2.2% Damai/Dholi, 2.1% Gharti/Bhujel, 1.5% Chepang/Praja, 0.9% Kamar, 0.9% Sarki, 0.7% Sanyasi/Dasnami, 0.7% Thakuri, 0.4% Musalman, 0.3% Badi, 0.3% Gurung, 0.1% Kalwar, 0.1% Ghale, 0.1% Limbu and 0.3% others.

In terms of religion, 65.7% were Hindu, 31.7% Buddhist, 1.9% Christian, 0.4% Muslim, 0.1% Prakriti and 0.1% others.

In terms of literacy, 65.2% could both read and write, 2.9% could read but not write and 31.8% could neither read nor write.

== Geography ==
East: Dhunibesi Municipality

West: Galchhi Gaupalika

North: Galchhi Gaupalika and Nuwakot District

South: Makawanpur District

== Population ==
As per 2017, Thakre hosts a population of 32,914 across a total area of 96.41 km^{2}.

== See also ==
- Dhading District
