= Khaniyabas Rural Municipality =

Rural Municipality in Central Nepal

Khaniyabas खनियाबास
- Rural Municipality in Nepal
- Location in Nepal
- Coordinates: 28°4′12.31″N 85°0′31.98″E
- Country: Nepal
- Development Region: Central
- Zone: Bagmati Province
- District: Dhading
- Rural Municipality: Khaniyabas
- Established: 10 March 2017

Government
  - Chairperson: Mr. Rana Bahadur Tamang (NC)
  - Vice-chairperson: Sekkerong Tamang (CpN)

Area
  - Total: 120.80 km^{2} (46.64 sq mi)

Population (2017)
  - Total: 12,749
- Time zone: UTC+5:45 (NST)
- Area code: 010
- Literacy Rate: ▲59.22%
- Website: khaniyabasmun.gov.np

Khaniyabas (Nepali: खनियाबास, romanized: khaniyabas) is a Gaupalika (Nepali: गाउपालिका, romanized: gaupalika) Formerly: village development committee) in Dhading District in the Bagmati Zone of central Nepal. It has a literacy rate of 59.22% . The local body was formed by merging three VDCs namely Jharlang, Darkha and Satyadevi. The population of the rural municipality is 12,749 according to the data collected on 2017 Nepalese local elections.

== Demographics ==
At the time of the 2011 Nepal census, Khaniyabas Rural Municipality had a population of 12,749. Of these, 86.8% spoke Tamang, 12.2% Nepali, 0.5% Gurung, 0.1% Newar and 0.2% other languages as their first language.

In terms of ethnicity/caste, 88.2% were Tamang, 4.2% Kami, 2.8% Magar, 1.1% Hill Brahmin, 0.9% Damai/Dholi, 0.9% Gurung, 0.8% Chhetri, 0.4% Gharti/Bhujel, 0.4% Newar, 0.1% Sarki and 0.3% others.

In terms of religion, 51.6% were Buddhist, 37.4% Christian, 10.8% Hindu and 0.2% others.

In terms of literacy, 59.8% could both read and write, 1.9% could read but not write and 38.2% could neither read nor write.

== Geography ==
East: Nuwakot District and Rasuwa District

West: Gangajamuna Gaupalika and Rubi Valley Gaupalika

North: Ruby Valley Gaupalika

South: Netrawati Gaupalika and Nuwakot District

== Population ==
As per 2017, Khaniyabas hosts a population of 12,749 across a total area of 120.80 km^{2}.

== See also ==
Dhading District

खनियाबास गाउँपालिकाको website
