= Netrawati Dabjong Rural Municipality =

Rural Municipality in Province No. 3, Nepal

Netrawati Dabjong
- Netrawati Dabjong Rural Municipality
- Location in Nepal
- Coordinates: 28°3′46.19″N 84°55′7.54″E
- Country: Nepal
- Province: Bagmati Province
- District: Dhading
- Time zone: UTC+5:45 (NST)
- Website: netrawatimun.gov.np

Netrawati Dabjong is a rural municipality in Dhading District of central Nepal. The local body was formed by merging 3 VDCs namely Katunje, Semjong and Marpak. It has a total of five wards.

== Demographics ==
At the time of the 2011 Nepal census, Netrawati Dabjong Rural Municipality had a population of 12,870. Of these, 56.8% spoke Nepali, 41.3% Tamang, 0.8% Ghale, 0.8% Gurung, 0.2% Newar and 0,1% other languages as their first language.

In terms of ethnicity/caste, 48.9% were Tamang, 11.5% Chhetri, 8.8% Gurung, 7.4% Newar, 5.9% Hill Brahmin, 5.8% Magar, 5.6% Kami, 2.8% Damai/Dholi, 2.8% Ghale, 0.1% Badi and 0.3% others.

In terms of religion, 54.9% were Buddhist, 44.0% Hindu, 1.0% Christian and 0.1% others.

In terms of literacy, 62.4% could both read and write, 1.6% could read but not write and 35.9% could neither read nor write.

== Geography ==
East: Nuwakot District

West: Gangajamuna Gaupalika

North: Ruby Valley Gaupalika

South: Nilkhantha
