= Siddhalek Rural Municipality =

Siddhalek सिद्धलेक गाउँपालिका
- Rural Municipality
- Location of rural council Siddhalek (Nepal)
- Coordinates: 27.84°N 84.81°E
- Country: Nepal
- Province: Bagmati
- District: Dhading
- Wards: 7
- Established: 10 March 2017

Government
  - Type: Rural Council
  - Chairperson: Mr. Parshuram Khatiwada
  - Vice-chairperson: Mrs. Sabita Aryal

Area
  - Total: 106.09 km^{2} (40.96 sq mi)

Population (2011)
  - Total: 23,729
  - Density: 223.67/km^{2} (579.30/sq mi)
- Time zone: UTC+5:45 (Nepal Standard Time)
- Headquarter: Salang
- Website: siddhalekmun.gov.np

Siddhalek is a rural municipality located within the Dhading District of the Bagmati Province of Nepal. The rural municipality spans 106.09 square kilometres (40.96 sq mi), with a total population of 23,729 according to a 2011 Nepal census.

On March 10, 2017, the Government of Nepal restructured the local level bodies into 753 new local level structures. The previous Nalang, Salang, and Kumpur VDCs were merged to form Siddhalek. Siddhalek is divided into 7 wards, with Salang declared the administrative center of the rural municipality.

== Demographics ==
At the time of the 2011 Nepal census, Siddhalek Rural Municipality had a population of 23,729. Of these, 86.4% spoke Nepali, 10.8% Magar, 1.3% Tamang, 0.8% Gurung, 0.2% Ghale, 0.2% Majhi, 0.2% Newar, 0.1% Urdu and 0.1% other languages as their first language.

In terms of ethnicity/caste, 19.6% were Magar, 18.3% Hill Brahmin, 16.5% Newar, 9.5% Sarki, 7.1% Chhetri, 6.2% Ghale, 5.0% Kami, 4.2% Sanyasi/Dasnami, 3.8% Damai/Dholi, 3.2% Gurung, 1.6% Gharti/Bhujel, 1.5% Tamang, 1.3% Majhi, 0.9% Thakuri, 0.6% Brahmu/Baramo, 0.1% Chepang/Praja,, 0.1% Gaine, 0.1% Limbu, 0.1% Musalman, 0.1% Rai, 0.1% other Terai and 0.2% others.

In terms of religion, 94.4% were Hindu, 4.0% Buddhist, 1.4% Christian, 0.1% Muslim and 0.1% others.

In terms of literacy, 64.4% could both read and write, 3.1% could read but not write and 32.5% could neither read nor write.
