= Tripurasundari Rural Municipality, Dhading =

Tripurasundari Rural Municipality त्रिपुरासुन्दरी गाउँपालिका
- Rural Municipality
- Location in Bagmati Province Tripurasundari Rural Municipality (Nepal)
- Coordinates: 27.99°N 84.81°E
- Country: Nepal
- Province: Bagmati Province
- District: Dhading District
- Established: 10 March 2017

Government
  - Type: Rural Council
  - Chairperson: Mr. Raju Upreti
  - Vice-Chairperson: Dev Raj Dharel

Area
  - Total: 271.23 km^{2} (104.72 sq mi)

Population (2011)
  - Total: 22,960
  - Density: 84.65/km^{2} (219.2/sq mi)
- Time zone: UTC+5:45 (Nepal Standard Time)
- Headquarter: Salyantar
- Website: tripurasundarimundhading.gov.np

Tripurasundari is a rural municipality located within the Dhading District of the Bagmati Province of Nepal. The rural municipality spans 271.23 square kilometres (104.72 sq mi), with a total population of 22,960 according to a 2011 Nepal census.

On March 10, 2017, the Government of Nepal restructured the local level bodies into 753 new local level structures. The previous Salyantar, Mulpani, Salyankot, Aginchok and Tripureshwar VDCs were merged to form Tripurasundari. Tripurasundari is divided into 7 wards, with Salyantar declared the administrative center of the rural municipality.

== Demographics ==
At the time of the 2011 Nepal census, Tripurasundari Rural Municipality had a population of 22,992. Of these, 95.2% spoke Nepali, 1.3% Tamang, 1.2% Kumhali, 0.6% Ghale, 0.6% Gurung, 0.5% Newar, 0.1% Bhojpuri, 0.1% Hindi, 0.1% Magar, 0.1% Urdu and 0.1% other languages as their first language.

In terms of ethnicity/caste, 26.5% were Chhetri, 13.2% Hill Brahmin, 12.2% Magar, 9.9% Newar, 9.8% Kumal, 6.3% Sarki, 4.2% Kami, 3.6% Damai/Dholi, 3.5% Darai, 3.1% Sanyasi/Dasnami, 2.5% Thakuri, 2.0% Gurung, 1.5% Tamang, 0.8% Ghale, 0.3% Musalman, 0.2% Majhi, 0.1% Rai, 0.1% Terai Brahmin and 0.3% others.

In terms of religion, 96.5% were Hindu, 1.6% Christian, 1.4% Buddhist, 0.3% Muslim and 0.2% others.

In terms of literacy, 64.0% could both read and write, 2.6% could read but not write and 33.4% could neither read nor write.

== Educational Institutions ==
- Salyantar Campus सल्यानटार क्याम्पस and Netrawati Campus located at Khahare Bazar.
- Ranipauwa Secondary School
- Salyantar Secondary School
- Mahendrodaya Secondary School, Mulpani, Pokhara
