= Benighat Rorang Rural Municipality =

Benighat Rorang वेनिघट रोराङ गाउँपालिका
- Rural Municipality
- Location of rural council Benighat Rorang (Nepal)
- Coordinates: 27°49′N 84°47′E
- Country: Nepal
- Province: Bagmati Province
- District: Dhading
- Wards: 10
- Established: 10 March 2017

Government
  - Type: Rural Council
  - Chairperson: Mr. Krishna Bahadur Thapaliya
  - Vice-chairperson: Mr. Tap Bahadur Shrestha

Area
  - Total: 29.17 km^{2} (11.26 sq mi)

Population (2011)
  - Total: 31,475
  - Density: 1,079/km^{2} (2,795/sq mi)
- Time zone: UTC+5:45 (Nepal Standard Time)
- Headquarter: Benighat
- Website: benighatrorangmun.gov.np

Benighat Rorang is a rural municipality located within the Dhading District of the Bagmati Province of Nepal. The rural municipality spans 206.52 square kilometres (79.74 sq mi), with a total population of 33,854 according to a 2021 Nepal census.

On March 10, 2017, the Government of Nepal restructured the local level bodies into 753 new local level structures. The previous Mahadevsthan, Benighat, Dhusha and Jogimara VDCs were merged to form Benighat Rorang. Benighat Rorang is divided into 10 wards, with Benighat declared the administrative center of the rural municipality.

== Demographics ==
At the time of the 2011 Nepal census, Benighat Rorang Rural Municipality had a population of 31,475. Of these, 58.0% spoke Nepali, 26.3% Chepang, 9.4% Tamang, 3.0% Magar, 1.1% Gurung, 0.6% Newar, 0.3% Bhojpuri, 0.3% Ghale, 0.2% Hindi, 0.2% Maithili, 0.2% Urdu, 0.1% Bhujel, 0.1% Rai, 0.1% Tharu and 0.1% other languages as their first language.

In terms of ethnicity/caste, 31.6% were Chepang/Praja, 11.2% Hill Brahmin, 10.5% Chhetri, 10.2% Tamang, 8.4% Magar, 7.0% Newar, 4.9% Kami, 4.0% Gurung, 2.9% Damai/Dholi, 2.6% Sarki, 1.7% Ghale, 1.7% Thakuri, 0.8% Sanyasi/Dasnami, 0.7% Musalman, 0.5% Gharti/Bhujel, 0.2% Brahmu/Baramo, 0.1% other Dalit, 0.1% Nuniya, 0.1% Rai, 0.1% Teli, 0.1% other Terai, 0.1% Tharu and 0.3% others.

In terms of religion, 75.6% were Hindu, 13.2% Buddhist, 8.0% Christian, 2.2% Prakriti, 0.7% Muslim and 0.2% others.

In terms of literacy, 62.9% could both read and write, 3.0% could read but not write and 34.0% could neither read nor write.
