= Khanikhola =

Coordinates: 28°32′N 81°55′E

Khanikhola खानीखोला
- Village development committee
- Interactive map of Khanikhola
- Country: Nepal
- Zone: Bagmati Zone
- District: Dhading District

Population (1991)
  - Total: 3,127
- Time zone: UTC+5:45 (Nepal Time)

Khanikhola is a village development committee in Surkhet District in the Bheri Zone of mid-western Nepal. At the time of the 1991 Nepal census it had a population of 3127 people living in 512 individual households.
