= Murali Bhanjyang =

Coordinates: 27°55′N 84°52′E

Murali Bhanjyang मुरलीभञ्ज्याङ
- Interactive map of Murali Bhanjyang
- Country: Nepal
- Zone: Bagmati Zone
- District: Dhading District

Population (1991)
  - Total: 5,709
  - Religions: Hindu
- Time zone: UTC+5:45 (Nepal Time)

== Geography and Climate ==
Murali Bhanjyang is a suburb in Nilkantha Municipality in Dhading District in the Bagmati Zone of central Nepal. The formerly Village development committee was merged to form municipality on 18 May 2014 merging along with Nilkantha, Sunaula Bazar, Murali Bhanjyang, Sangkosh Village development committees.

== Population ==
At the Census of 2011, this Village Development Committee has 7,253 inhabitants and 1,673 households. Among them there are 3,277 males and 3,976 females.

== Religious and touristic attractions ==
This Village Development Committee has many places for religious purposes as well as for tourism.
