= Katunje, Dhading =

Coordinates: 27°59′N 84°55′E

Katunje कटुन्जे Katunje Bazar
- Village Executive
- Interactive map of Katunje
- Country: Nepal
- Zone: Bagmati Zone
- District: Dhading District

Population (2011)
  - Total: 5,906
  - Religions: Hindu Buddhism
- Time zone: UTC+5:45 (Nepal Time)

Katunje is a village development committee in Dhading District in the Bagmati Zone of central Nepal. At the time of the 2011 Nepal census it had a population of 5906 and had 1425 houses in it.

The village is accessible from Dhading by dirt road (closed during monsoon season) and it takes around 1–2 hours to get to the village. In the monsoon season the road is closed and it is a 5–6 hour trek to the village.

There are at least 3-5 schools in the village. There is also an education initiative called Future Village (a 2-storey cottage) for education of students.
