= Pabil =

Mountain in Nepal

- Ganesh IV
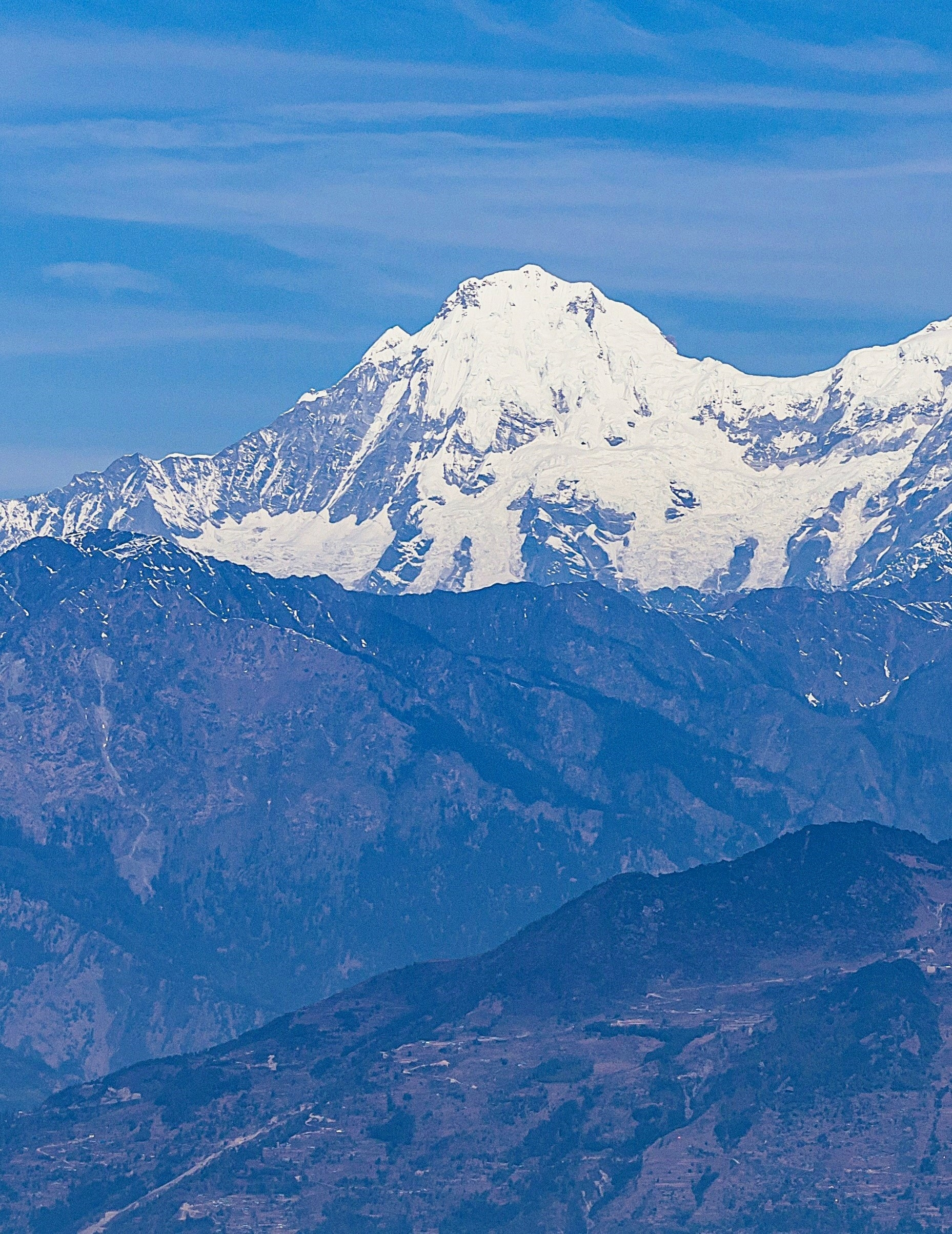
- South aspect

Highest point
- Elevation: 7,104 m (23,307 ft)
- Prominence: 964 m (3,163 ft)
- Parent peak: Ganesh NW
- Isolation: 4.33 km (2.69 mi)
- Coordinates: 28°20′45″N 85°04′49″E

Geography
- Location within Nepal
- Interactive map of Pabil
- Country: Nepal
- Province: Bagmati / Gandaki
- District: Dhading / Gorkha
- Parent range: Himalayas; Ganesh Himal

Climbing
- First ascent: October 1978

Pabil, also known as Ganesh IV, is a mountain in Nepal.

== Description ==
Pabil is a 7,104-metre (23,307-foot) glaciated summit in the Ganesh Himal subrange of the Himalayas. It is situated 70 kilometres (43 mi) north-northwest of Kathmandu on the common boundary shared by Bagmati Province and Gandaki Province. The peak ranks as the highest point in Dhading District and the 69th-highest in Nepal. Precipitation runoff from the mountain's slopes drains into tributaries of the Budhi Gandaki River. Topographic relief is significant as the west face rises 1,100 metres (3,609 ft) in one kilometre (0.62 mi), the northeast slope rises 2,300 metres (7,546 ft) in two kilometres (1.2 mi), and the south slope rises 3,900 metres (12,800 ft) in six kilometres (3.7 mi). The first ascent of the summit was achieved on October 20, 1978, via the south face and southeast ridge by T. Tomita, H. Yoshio, K. Aoyagi, M. Hashimoto, Y. Hashimoto, Y. Okuma, T. Shimoji, T. Suzuki, I. Yasuda, Yogendra Thapa, Kamal Bhandari, Mingma Tenzing Sherpa, and Sonan Wolang Sherpa.

== Climate ==
Based on the Köppen climate classification, Pabil is located in a tundra climate zone with cold, snowy winters, and cool summers. Weather systems coming off the Bay of Bengal are forced upwards by the Himalaya mountains (orographic lift), causing heavy precipitation in the form of rainfall and snowfall. Mid-June through early-August is the monsoon season. The months of April, May, September, and October offer the most favorable weather for viewing or climbing this peak.

== Gallery ==
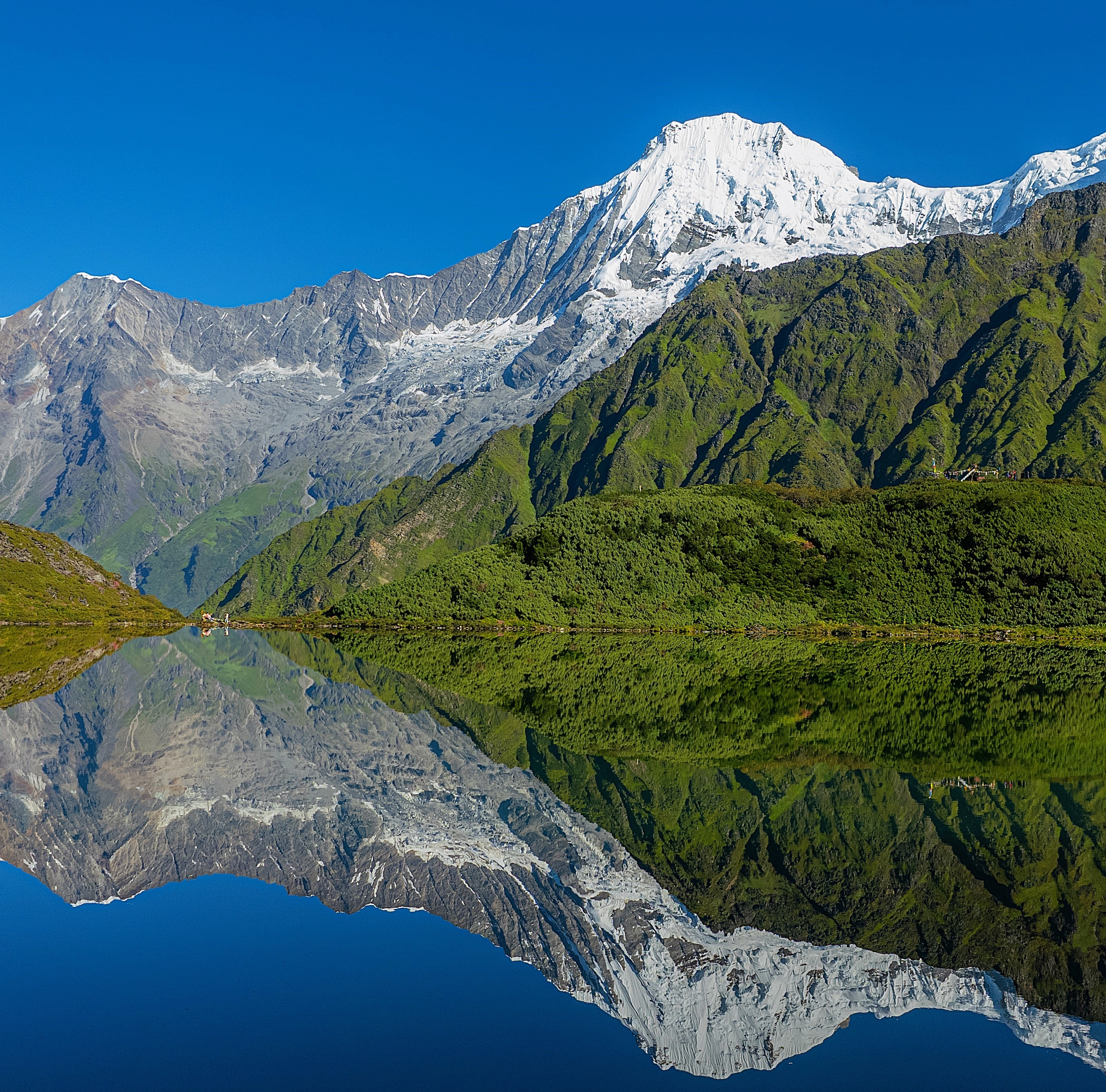
South aspect of Pabil reflected in Kalo Daha Lake

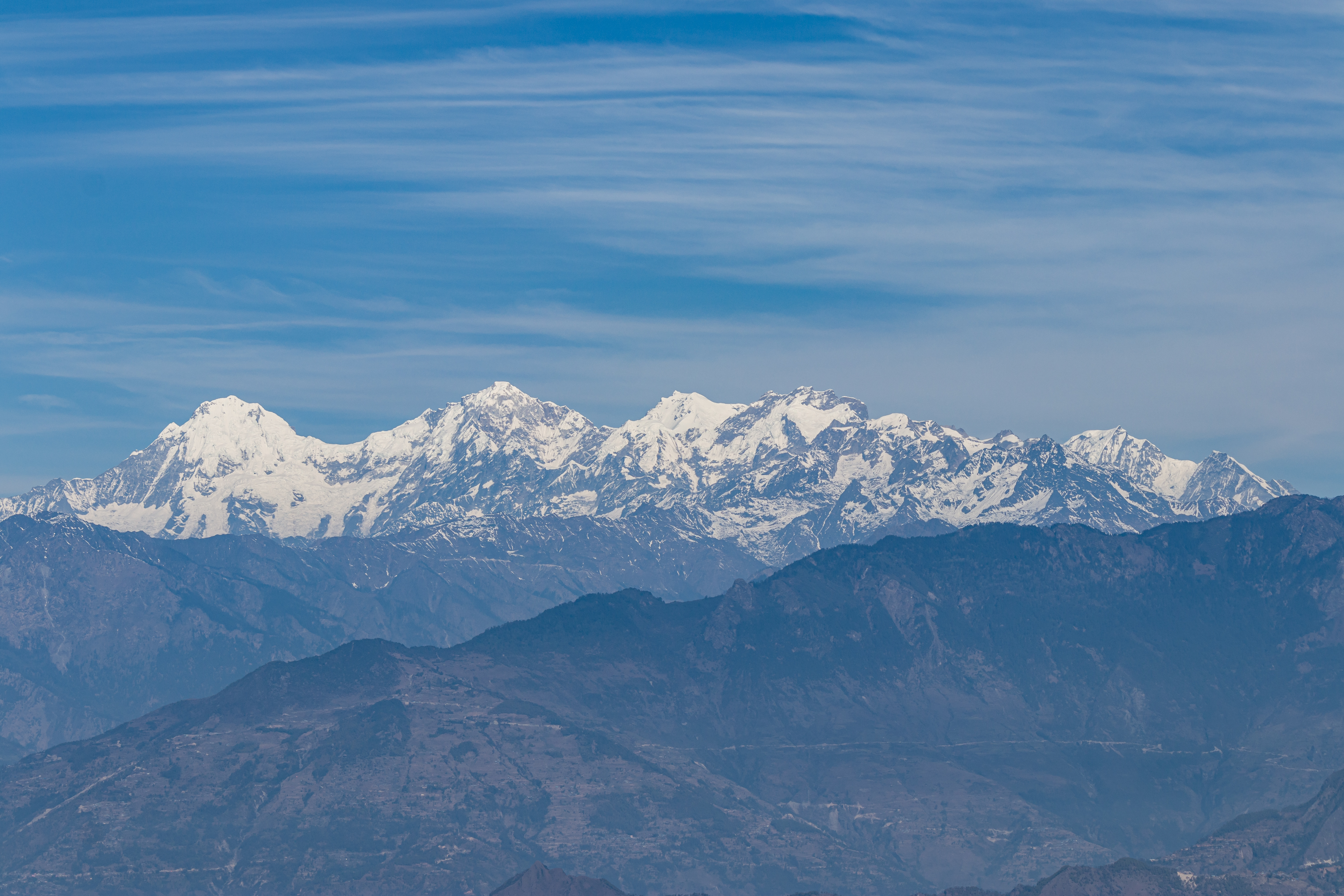
The Ganesh Himal with Pabil furthest to left

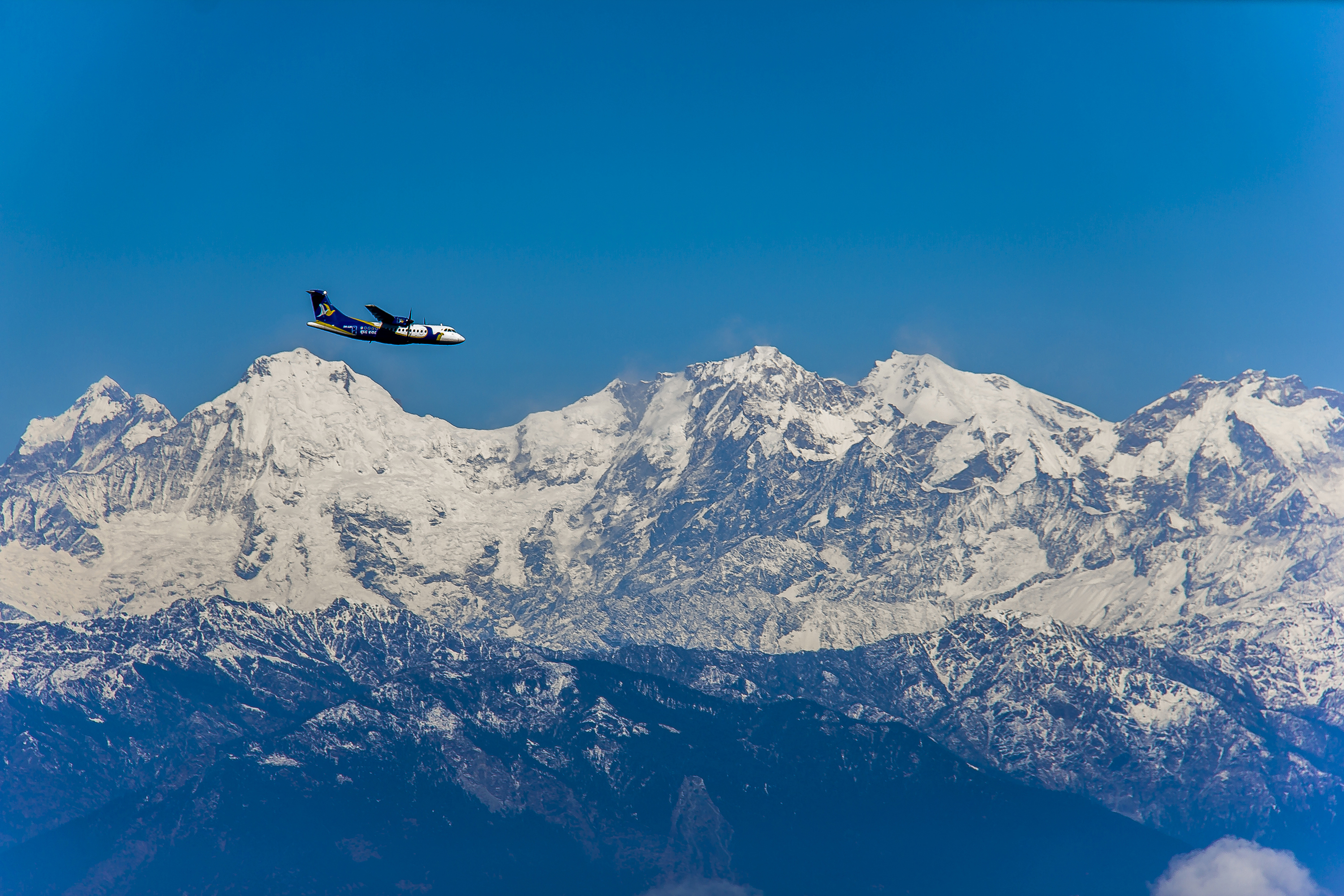
Pabil to left (under aircraft)

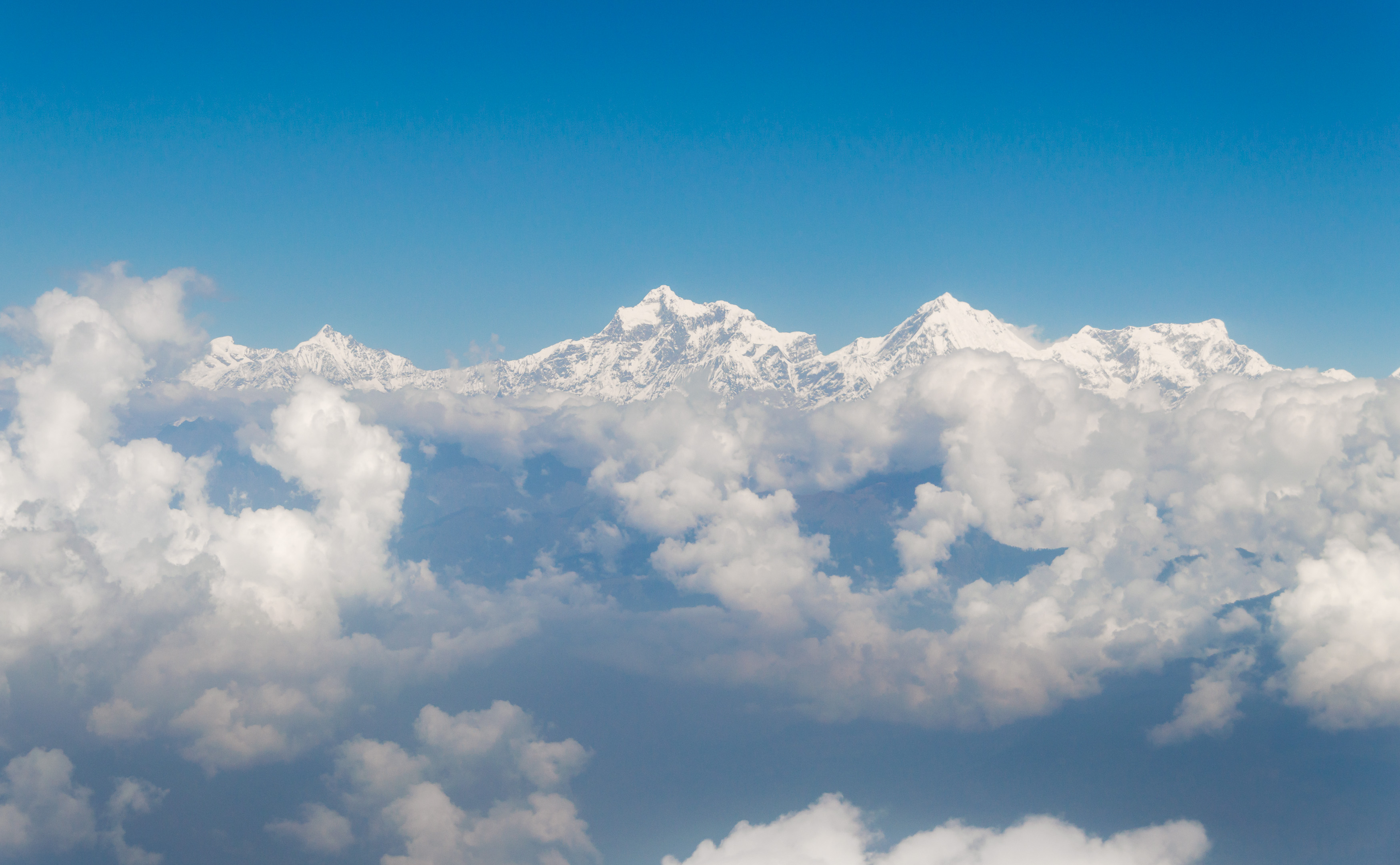
Pabil to right of center (Ganesh NW centered)

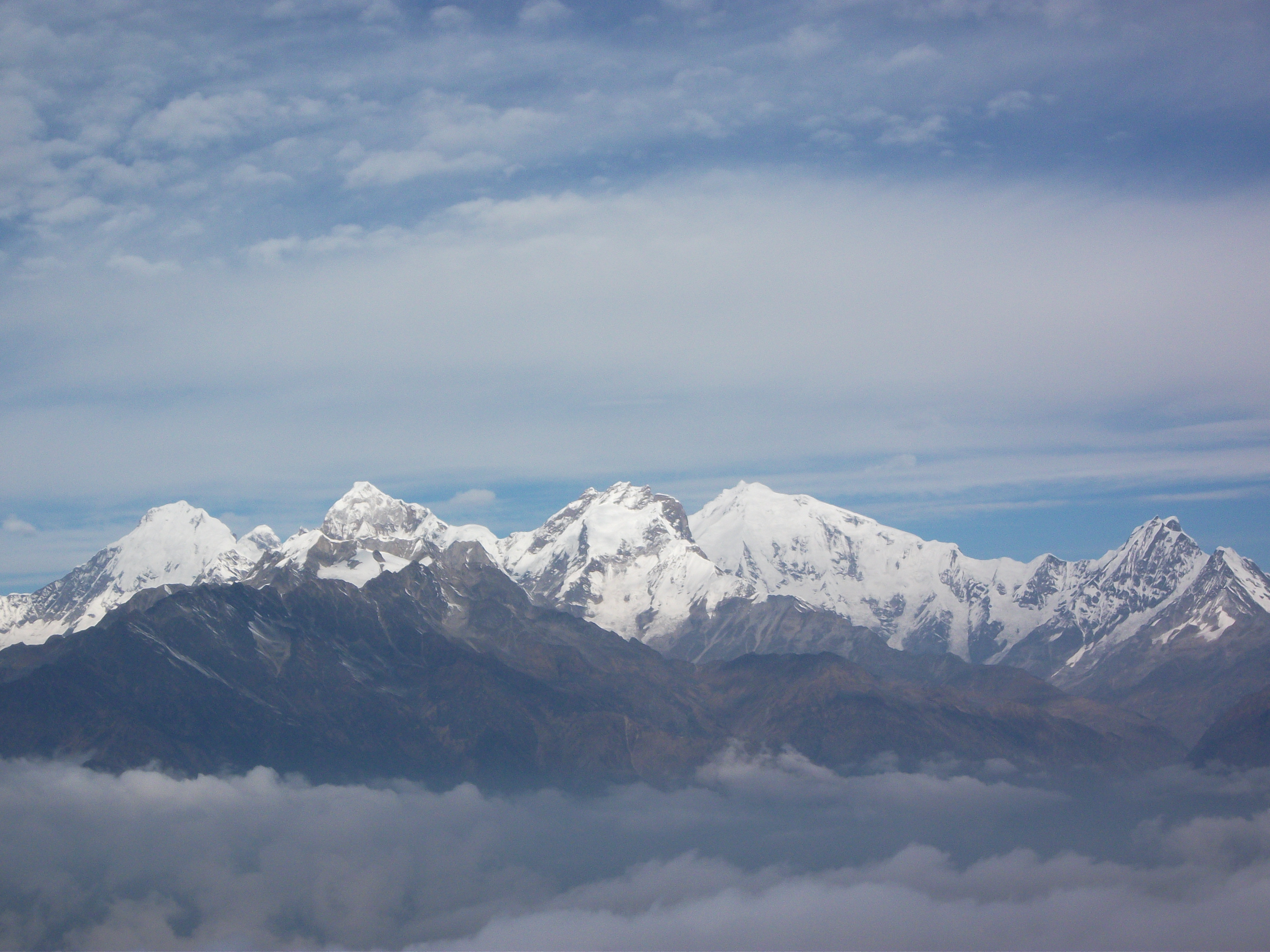
Pabil furthest to left

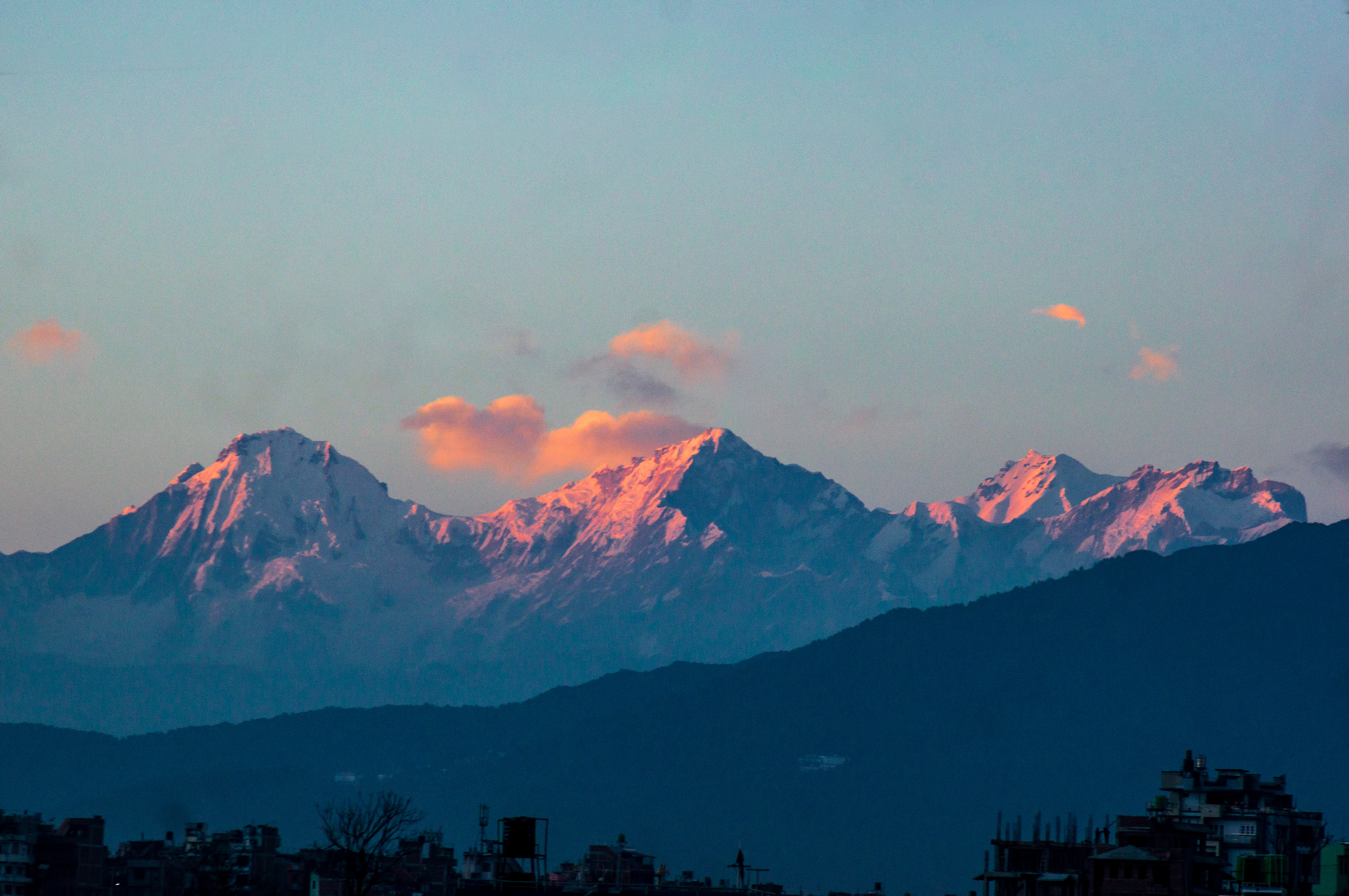
Pabil to left

== See also ==
- Geology of the Himalayas
