= Gajuri Rural Municipality =

Rural Municipality in Central, Nepal

Gajuri गजुरी (Nepali)
- Gaupalika
- Rural Municipality in Nepal
- Location in Nepal
- Coordinates: 27.77°N 84.85°E
- Country: Nepal
- Development Region: Central
- Zone: Bagmati
- District: Dhading
- Province: Province No. 3
- Rural Municipality: Gajuri

Government
  - Chairperson: Mr. Ganesh Lal Shrestha (CPN (Maoist Center))
  - Vice-chairperson: Mrs. Sarmila Bishural (Nepali Congress)

Area
  - Total: 138.66 km^{2} (53.54 sq mi)

Population (2017)
  - Total: 27,084
  - Density: 195.33/km^{2} (505.89/sq mi)
  - Religions: Hindu Muslim Buddhist

Languages
  - Local: Nepali, Newar language, Tamang, Gurung, Magar
- Time zone: UTC+5:45 (NST)
- Postal Code: 45112
- Area code: 010
- Literacy Rate: ▲64.28% High
- Website: http://gajurimun.gov.np

Gajuri (Nepali: गजुरी, romanized: gajuri) is a Gaupalika (Nepali: गाउपालिका, romanized: gaupalika) (Formerly: village development committee) in Dhading District in the Bagmati Zone of central Nepal. It has a literacy rate of 64.28% (70.30% male and 58.41% female). The city hosts as one of the city with highest literacy rate in the Dhading district. The local body was formed by merging three VDCs namely Gajuri, Pida, Nepal, Kiranchok.

At the time of the 2011 Nepal census it had a population of 10,035 including 4,968 males and 5,067 females, being one of the most populated city in the district. The average household size was 4.51. Besides, it had 2,223 houses in this area. According to the report, out of 2,223 houses, around 1,884 had at least one facility like Radio, Television, Internet, etc.

During the collection of voters data for 2017 Nepalese local elections, the population of Gajuri was calculated to be 27,084.

== Rural Municipality ==
Gajuri was declared as Rural Municipality on March 10, 2017. The formation of Rural Municipality led to local level elections on May 14, 2017. Out of a population of 27,084, there were 14,169 total eligible voters. CPN (UML) won positions for both Chairperson and Vice-Chairperson with a vote count of 4,336 and 4,214 respectively.

== Transportation ==
Gajuri is connected to Kathmandu to the east and Malekhu to the west by Prithvi Highway.

== Geography ==
Gajuri lies at the North-Western part of Dhading District to the south of Trishuli River and covers an area of 138.66 km^{2}. The average altitude of Gajuri is 547 metres (1796 ft) above sea level.

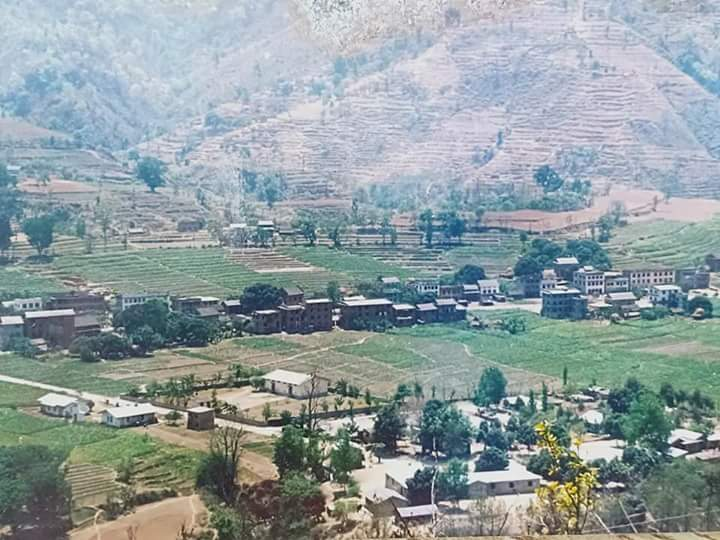
Gajuri in 1989 AD (2046 B.S)

== Demographics ==
Per 2011 Census, the total population of Gajuri was 10,035 out of which 4,968 were male and 5,067 female in 2,223 households. Average family size was 4.51

== Population ==
=== By Age ===
Sex	Total	00 - 04	05 - 09	10 - 14	15 - 19	20 - 24	25 - 29	30 - 34	35 - 39	40 - 44	45 - 49	50 - 54	55 - 59	60 - 64	65 - 69	70 - 74	75 +
Both Sex	10,035	1,001	1,261	1,346	1,148	878	796	604	556	533	408	399	286	245	184	146	244
Male	4,968	507	645	677	545	382	365	290	269	273	212	217	149	131	95	79	132
Female	5,067	494	616	669	603	496	431	314	287	260	196	182	137	114	89	67	112

=== By Literacy Rate ===
Sex	Pop. aged 5 and 5+	Who can Read & Write	Who can Read only	Who can't read & write	Not Stated	Literacy Rate
Both Sex	9,034	5,807	329	2,893	5	64.28
Male	4,461	3,136	171	1,152	2	70.30
Female	4,573	2,671	158	1,741	3	58.41

=== By Caste ===
Caste/Ethnicity	Total	Male	Female
All Caste	10,035	4,968	5,067
Chhetree	1,301	620	681
Brahman - Hill	1,776	878	898
Magar	525	244	281
Tharu	23	13	10
Tamang	2,229	1,120	1,109
Newar	646	315	331
Musalman	75	52	23
Kami	597	298	299
Gurung	101	46	55
Damai/Dholi	375	195	180
Thakuri	18	8	10
Sarki	591	288	303
Sanyasi/Dashnami	74	41	33
Gharti/Bhujel	44	20	24
Majhi	17	10	7
Chepang/Praja	1,405	711	694
Ghale	181	80	101
Others	57	29	28

=== Hospitals ===
- Gajuri Primary Health Centre
- Gajuri Hospital Pvt. Ltd

=== Schools ===
- Adarsha Secondary School
- Munal Academy
- Pawil Himal Academy

=== College ===
- Adarsha Multiple Campus

== See also ==
- Dhading District
