= Mulpani, Dhading =

Mulpani मूलपानी
- Village development committee
- Location in Nepal
- Coordinates: 28.05°N 84.87°E
- Country: Nepal
- Zone: Bagmati Zone
- District: Dhading District

Population (1991)
  - Total: 3,344
  - Religions: Hindu
- Time zone: UTC+5:45 (Nepal Time)

Mulpani was a village development committee in Dhading District in the Bagmati Zone of central Nepal. At the time of the 1991 Nepal census it had a population of 3344 and had 643 houses in it. Now it is a village of Tripurasundari Rural Municipality, Dhading.
