= Sirtung =

Sertung सेर्तुङ
- Village development committee
- Country: Nepal
- Zone: Bagmati Zone
- District: Dhading District

Population (1991)
  - Total: 3,621
  - Religions: Buddhist
- Time zone: UTC+5:45 (Nepal Time)

Sertung is a village development committee in Dhading District in the Bagmati Zone of central Nepal. At the time of the 1991 Nepal census it had a population of 3621 and had 695 houses in it.
