= Gangajamuna Rural Municipality =

Rural Municipality in Central Nepal

Gangajamuna गंगाजमुना
- Rural Municipality in Nepal
- Location in Nepal
- Coordinates: 28°3′46.19″N 84°55′7.54″E
- Country: Nepal
- Development Region: Central
- District: Dhading
- Province: Bagmati Province
- Rural Municipality: Gangajamuna

Government
  - Chairperson: Bhakta Lama
  - Vice Chairperson: Rameshwor Simkhada

Area
  - Total: 154.72 km^{2} (59.74 sq mi)

Population (2017)
  - Total: 21,784
  - Density: 140.80/km^{2} (364.66/sq mi)
- Time zone: UTC+5:45 (NST)
- Area code: 010
- Website: gangajamunamun.gov.np

Gangajamuna (Nepali: गंगाजमुना, romanized: gangajamuna) is a Gaupalika (Nepali: गाउपालिका, romanized: gaupalika) Formerly: village development committee) in Dhading District in the Bagmati Province of central Nepal. The local body was formed by merging five VDCs namely Rigaun, Gumdi, Phulkharka, Baseri and Budhathum. Currently, it has a total of 7 wards, larger VDCS Gumdi, and Rigaun are divided in 2 wards each whereas other VDCs are divided into only one ward. The population of the rural municipality is 21,784 according to the data collected on 2017 Nepalese local elections.

== Demographics ==
At the time of the 2011 Nepal census, Gangajamuna Rural Municipality had a population of 21,784. Of these, 49.0% spoke Nepali, 30.0% Tamang, 11.4% Gurung, 9.2% Ghale, 0.2% Newar and 0.2% other languages as their first language.

In terms of ethnicity/caste, 30.0% were Tamang, 18.9% Chhetri, 13.7% Gurung, 11.4% Ghale, 6.7% Hill Brahmin, 4.9% Newar, 4.4% Kami, 4.3% Magar, 2.9% Sarki, 1.9% Damai/Dholi, 0.4% Gharti/Bhujel, 0.3% Rai, 0.1% Musalman and 0.1% others.

In terms of religion, 48.6% were Hindu, 32.7% Buddhist, 18.6% Christian and 0.1% Muslim.

In terms of literacy, 59.7% could both read and write, 1.6% could read but not write and 38.8% could neither read nor write.

== Population ==
As per 2017, Gangajamuna hosts a population of 21,784 across a total area of 152.72 km^{2} (58.97 sq mi). total area of 7 wards are not recognized yet .

== See also ==
- Dhading District
