= Ghussa =

Ghussa घुसा
- Village development committee
- Country: Nepal
- Zone: Bagmati Zone
- District: Dhading District

Population (1991)
  - Total: 4,881
  - Religions: Hindu
- Time zone: UTC+5:45 (Nepal Time)

Ghussa is a village development committee in Dhading District in the Bagmati Zone of central Nepal. At the time of the 1991 Nepal census it had a population of 4881 and had 860 houses in it.
