= Rigaun =

Ree gaun रिगाउँ ( Nepali Language)
- Village development committee
- Location in Nepal
- Coordinates: 28.11°N 84.97°E
- Country: Nepal
- Zone: Bagmati Zone
- District: Dhading District
- Province: Province No. 3
- Rural Municipality: Gangajamuna

Government
  - Asst. Secy. GRM: Enjeela Tamang
  - ward no 1 Secy.: Bahadur Tamang
  - Ward no.2 Secy.: Phaising Tamang

Population (1991)
  - Total: 5,218
  - Religions: Christian Bon and Buddhist
- Time zone: UTC+5:45 (Nepal Time)
- Postal code: 45100

Rigaun or Ree gaun is a village development committee in Dhading District in the Bagmati Zone of central Nepal. At the time of the 1991 Nepal census it had a population of 5218 and had 875 houses in it. Ree Gaun is located in the Northern part of Dhading. It consists of wards no 1 & 2 of Gangajamuna Rural Municipality, State 3, Dhading Nepal. There are 90% people of the Tamang ethnic group, and some are Gurung, Kami (BK), Damai. The main occupation of this area is agriculture.

== Village's name list in Ree ==
- Tawal Village & Tawal Bensi
- Dhuseni Village
- Latab Village
- Kutal Village
- Saleri & Teshyapho Village
- Shyaktali Village
- Gangmrang Village
- Ree gaun. Choke Village
- Epi Village Village
- Richet Village
- Tajimrang Village
- Kichet, Annar Cheprang, & Karang Village

=== Ward no.1 ===
The ward no.1 is combined with 4 local wards.

1. Ree gaun
2. Choke Village
3. Epi Village Village
4. Richet Village
5. Tajimrang Village
6. Kichet Village
7. Annar Cheprang
8. Karang Village

=== Ward no.2 ===
There are more than six local villages has been combined in ward no.2 after the new local governance of GRM.

1. Latab Village
2. Dhuseni Village
3. Tawal Village & Tawal Bensi
4. Kutal Village
5. Saleri & Teshyapho Village
6. Shyaktali Village
7. Gangmrang Village

== Tourist destination ==
- Longarchet Valley: a place where earthquake victims lived for two years as temporary place.
- Shyanchet Dada
- Pasangchowk
- Palang-Naang

== Economy ==
The main occupation of Ree Gaun is farming. The recent local business here is knitting baskets, selling local products like baskets and meats.

== Administration ==
Ree Gaun VDC consists of two wards.

1. Ward 1 – Office: Tajimrang
2. Ward 2 – Office: Tawal Mele Dada

== Earthquake 2015 ==
In Ree Gaun the earthquake of 2015 killed more than 78 people, and 99% of houses and buildings were completely destroyed.

== Rivers ==
The main river of the Ree is Kutal-Chhumrung Khola which comes from Ganesh Himal and passes through Ringne and Lapang and meets Kutal-Chhumrung Khola separates the Ree and Dark, Jharlang. There are 5 small rivers, the main being Kutal-Chhumrung Khola, Chimchok Khola, Kalshyong Khola, Saleri Khola. Besides these, there are over 10 smaller rivers, springs and seasonal streams.
