= Jyamaruk =

Jyamrung ज्यामरुङ
- Village development committee
- Interactive map of Jyamrung
- Location in Nepal
- Coordinates: 28°00′N 84°54′E
- Country: Nepal
- Zone: Bagmati Zone
- District: Dhading District

Population (1991)
  - Total: 6,888
  - Religions: Hindu
- Time zone: UTC+5:45 (Nepal Time)

Jyamaruk is a village development committee in Dhading District in the Bagmati Zone of central Nepal. At the time of the 1991 Nepal census it had a population of 6888 and had 1285 houses in it.
