= Sangkosh =

Sangkosh साङकोष
- Location in Nepal
- Coordinates: 27.94°N 84.91°E
- Country: Nepal
- Zone: Bagmati Zone
- District: Dhading District

Population (1991)
  - Total: 4,391
  - Religions: Hindu
- Time zone: UTC+5:45 (Nepal Time)

Sangkosh is a town in Nilkantha Municipality in Dhading District in the Bagmati Province of central Nepal. The formerly Village development committee was merged to form municipality on 18 May 2014 merging along with Nilkantha, Sunaula Bazar, Murali Bhanjyang, Sangkosh Village development committees. At the time of the 1991 Nepal census it had a population of 4391 and had 847 houses in it.
