= Sunaula Bazar =

Coordinates: 27°51′N 84°57′E

Sunaula Bazar सुनौलाबजार
- Interactive map of Sunaula Bazar
- Country: Nepal
- Zone: Bagmati Zone
- District: Dhading District

Population (1991)
  - Total: 6,480
  - Religions: Hindu
- Time zone: UTC+5:45 (Nepal Time)

Sunaula Bazar is a town in the Nilkantha Municipality in the Dhading District in the Bagmati Zone of central Nepal. The former Sunaula Bazar village development committee was merged into Nilkantha Municipality on 18 May 2014, along with the Murali Bhanjyang and Sangkosh Village development committees. At the time of the 1991 Nepal census, it had a population of 6480, comprising 1233 houses. It was formerly the head of the Dhading District.

== Education ==
Altogether it has two higher secondary schools, Bhairabi Higher Secondary School is the first secondary school in the Dhading District. Yearly, about 500 students attend school. Bhuwan Adhikari is the all-time top scorer in SLC from Sunaula Bazar with 91.125%.

== Climate ==
Climate data for Sunaula Bazar (Dhading), elevation 1,420 m (4,660 ft)
Month	Jan	Feb	Mar	Apr	May	Jun	Jul	Aug	Sep	Oct	Nov	Dec	Year
Mean daily maximum °C (°F)	15.9 (60.6)	17.8 (64.0)	21.8 (71.2)	26.4 (79.5)	27.1 (80.8)	26.9 (80.4)	25.7 (78.3)	25.8 (78.4)	25.1 (77.2)	24.2 (75.6)	20.6 (69.1)	17.2 (63.0)	22.9 (73.2)
Mean daily minimum °C (°F)	4.1 (39.4)	5.3 (41.5)	9.1 (48.4)	13.5 (56.3)	15.8 (60.4)	17.9 (64.2)	18.4 (65.1)	18.1 (64.6)	17.0 (62.6)	13.8 (56.8)	8.2 (46.8)	4.7 (40.5)	12.2 (53.9)
Average precipitation mm (inches)	22.3 (0.88)	24.5 (0.96)	43.0 (1.69)	74.4 (2.93)	175.0 (6.89)	357.3 (14.07)	535.2 (21.07)	520.4 (20.49)	294.7 (11.60)	59.7 (2.35)	8.2 (0.32)	10.4 (0.41)	2,125.1 (83.66)
Source 1: Australian National University
Source 2: Japan International Cooperation Agency (precipitation)
