= Salasungo =

Mountain on the China–Nepal border

- Ganesh III/IV, Ganesh SE, Sangjing Ri, Tsala Sungo, Chaglasumgo, Kang Lombo
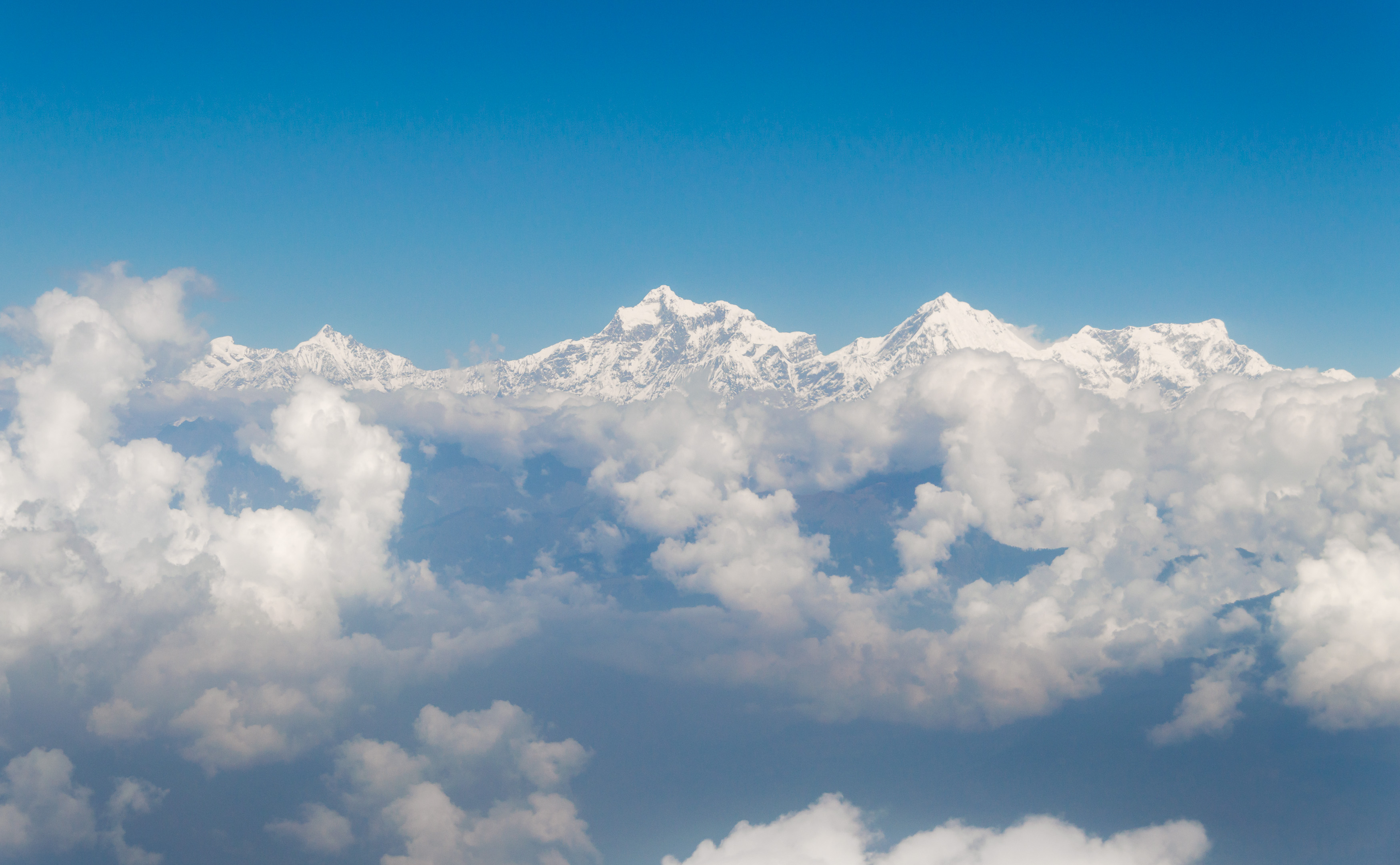
- Ganesh Himal massif. Salasungo is on the right side of the range

Highest point
- Elevation: 7,043 m (23,107 ft)
- Prominence: 641 m (2,103 ft)
- Coordinates: 28°20′06″N 85°07′18″E

Geography
- Location within Nepal
- Location: Nepal/China (Tibet)
- Parent range: Ganesh Himal, Himalaya

Climbing
- First ascent: 19 October 1979 by hideo Ogura (Japan, Pemba Tshering Sherpa and Dawa Norbu Sherpa (Nepal)
- Easiest route: rock/snow/ice climb

Salasungo (also known as Ganesh III/IV, Ganesh SE, Sangjing Ri, Tsala Sungo, Chaglasumgo or Kang Lombo) is a peak of the Ganesh Himal, on the border between Nepal and Tibet (China).

Salasungo, and the entire Ganesh Himal, lie between the Burhi Gandaki and Trisuli Gandaki valleys, about 70 km northwest of Kathmandu. Salasungo lies about 6 km south of Yangra (Ganesh I). The name "Salasungo" is also often used to refer to another peak located 4 km further west, Ganesh NW.

== Nomenclature and altitude ==
Nomenclature for this peak is ambiguous and confusing, and varies between sources. The mountain was previously known as Ganesh II till resurveyed in the early 1990s. Elder map source give an altitude of 7150m and 7110m, but the altitude of 7043m given by the Finnmap is currently the most widely accepted.

== Sources ==
- The Himalayan Database
- 8000ers.com
