= Budhathum =

Budhathum बुढाथुम
- Village development committee
- Location in Nepal
- Coordinates: 28.08°N 84.85°E
- Country: Nepal
- Zone: Bagmati Zone
- District: Dhading District

Population (1991)
  - Total: 3,946
  - Religions: Hindu
- Time zone: UTC+5:45 (Nepal Time)

Budhathum is a Ward in Gangajamuna Gaupalika in Dhading District in the Bagmati Province of central Nepal. At the time of the 1991 Nepal census it had a population of 3946 and had 693 houses in it. It is 40 kilometers away from the district headquarter Dhadingbesi. The main occupation of the people here is agriculture. However running local business, joining government service and going abroad have also become common these days.
