= Phulkharka =

Phulkharka फुलखर्क
- Village development committee
- Ganga Jamuna Falls

- Location in Nepal
- Coordinates: 28.06°N 84.92°E
- Country: Nepal
- Zone: Bagmati Zone
- District: Dhading District

Population (2011)
  - Total: 4,125
  - Religions: Hindu
- Time zone: UTC+5:45 (Nepal Time)

Phulkharka was one of the village development committees in Dhading District of central Nepal. But since 2017 it lies in ward number 5 of Ganga Jamuna Gaupalika (Rural Municipality) of Dhading District. This ward lies in northern part of district. In 2011, it had a population of around 4,125 with 920 households. Of 4,125 total population, women population was 2,356. Chhetree, Tamang, Gurung, Magar, Ghale, Kami, Brahmin, Damai, Sarki, Bhujel, Newar caste etc. live in this village. This village has famous Ganga Jamuna falls and Tinsure danda viewpoint. Phulkharka village is good source of freshwater which are currently used for drinking water, and irrigation. As listed below, there are 12 primary and secondary schools in this village:

1. Mandali Higher Secondary School, Phulkharka
2. Hile Pokhari Lower Secondary School, Shuka Bhanjyang
3. Annapurna Primary School, Kalleri
4. Saraswati Primary School, Majuwa
5. Dhandkharka Primary School, Dhandkharka
6. Sundar Primary School, Sadan
7. Sitala Primary School, Phulkharka
8. Jalkanya Primary School, Kattike
9. Balauta Primary School, Lapsibot
10. Kuwapani Primary School, Painyukharka
11. Gangajamuna Primary School, Dangsing
12. Kalika Primary School, Mahabhir
