= Ranibari, Thakre-3, Dhading =

Ranibari
- Village
- Interactive map of Ranibari
- Coordinates: 27°44′19″N 85°06′18″E
- Country: Nepal

Ranibari is a village located at Thakre Gaupalika ward number 6 of Dhading District, Nepal. It is 36 kilometers west from Kathmandu, the capital city of Nepal. It is located at Latitude 27°44'19″ North and longitude 85°06'18″ East. The village can be reached in about two hours of driving from Kalanki, Kathmandu. There are approximately 300 households and two public schools, Shree Setidevi Secondary School (SSSS) and Shree Janajagriti Higher Secondary School. Temple of Setidevi is situated at the top of the village from which the school derives its name.
