= Marpak =

Marpak मार्पाक
- Village development committee
- Location in Nepal
- Coordinates: 28.02°N 84.96°E
- Country: Nepal
- Zone: Bagmati Zone
- District: Dhading District

Population (1991)
  - Total: 3,987
  - Religions: Hindu
- Time zone: UTC+5:45 (Nepal Time)

Marpak is a village development committee in Dhading District in the Bagmati Zone of central Nepal. At the time of the 1991 Nepal census it had a population of 3987 and had 718 houses in it.
