= Tasarphu =

Tasarpu तसर्पु
- Village development committee
- Location in Nepal
- Coordinates: 27.72°N 85.08°E
- Country: Nepal
- Zone: Bagmati Zone
- District: Dhading District

Population (1991)
  - Total: 4,321
  - Religions: Hindu
- Time zone: UTC+5:45 (Nepal Time)

Tasarphu is a village development committee in Dhading District in the Bagmati Zone of central Nepal. At the time of the 1991 Nepal census it had a population of 4321 and had 787 houses in it.
