= Salang, Nepal =

Salang, Nepal सलाङ
- Village development committee
- Location in Nepal
- Coordinates: 27.84°N 84.81°E
- Country: Nepal
- Zone: Bagmati Zone
- District: Dhading District

Population (1991)
  - Total: 4,751
  - Religions: Hindu
- Time zone: UTC+5:45 (Nepal Time)

Salang, Nepal is a village development committee in Dhading District in the Bagmati Zone of central Nepal. At the time of the 1991 Nepal census it had a population of 4751 and had 832 houses in it.
