= Salyantar =

Salyantar सल्यानटार
- Village development committee
- Location in Nepal
- Coordinates: 27.99°N 84.81°E
- Country: Nepal
- Zone: Bagmati Zone
- District: Dhading District

Population (1991)
  - Total: 6,196
  - Religions: Hindu
- Time zone: UTC+5:45 (Nepal Time)

Salyantar is a village development committee in Dhading District in the Bagmati Zone of central Nepal.It is the biggest as well as longest tar of Nepal. At the time of the 1991 Nepal census it had a population of 6196 and had 1110 houses in it. Hinduism is the major religion. The literacy rate is roughly 55% for males and 35% for females.

The major castes living in Salyantar are Kumal and Darai. Millet and pulses are the major products of Salyantar. There is a health facility in Salyantar called as Salyantar Primary Health Care Centre. Salyantar is surrounded by four rivers viz. Budhigandaki in the west, Netrawoti(aankhu khola) in the south, Hyapinge in the east and Kaste in the north but Salyantar is a table like place.

Salyantar is famous for Mas Dhal, longest and second largest Tar in Nepal and Sri Nrsimha Dham Kshetra, a religious and educational hub for followers of the Vedic Sanatan Hindu religion, where Jagannath Foundation - Sri Rupanuga Para Vidyapeeth, Bimala Devi temple, Shesa Temple, Sada Shiva and the ancient Nrsimha Deva temple are the main attractions.
