= Semjong =

Semjong सेमजोङ
- Village development committee
- Location in Nepal
- Coordinates: 27.99°N 84.99°E
- Country: Nepal
- Zone: Bagmati Zone
- District: Dhading District

Population (1991)
  - Total: 4,068
  - Religions: Buddhism
- Time zone: UTC+5:45 (Nepal Time)

Semjong is a village development committee in Dhading District in the Bagmati Zone of central Nepal. At the time of the 1991 Nepal census it had a population of 4068. Caste (Gurung, Dalits, Tamang and others).
