= Gumdi =

Gumdi गुम्दी
- Village development committee
- Location in Nepal
- Coordinates: 28.05°N 84.95°E
- Country: Nepal
- Zone: Bagmati Zone
- District: Dhading District

Population (1991)
  - Total: 5,091
  - Religions: Hindu
- Time zone: UTC+5:45 (Nepal Time)

Gumdi is a village development committee in Dhading District in the Bagmati Zone of central Nepal. At the time of the 1991 Nepal census it had a population of 5091 and had 898 houses in it.

== See also ==
- Gumdi.com - Daily New GazabPost
