= Nalang =

Nalang नलाङ
- Village development committee
- Location in Nepal
- Coordinates: 27.87°N 84.84°E
- Country: Nepal
- Zone: Bagmati Zone
- District: Dhading District

Population (2011)
  - Total: 8,067
  - Religions: Hindu
- Time zone: UTC+5:45 (Nepal Time)

Nalang is a village development committee in Dhading District in the Bagmati Zone of central Nepal. At the time of the National Population and Housing Census 2011 it had a population of 8067 and had 1876 houses in it.
