= Satyadevi =

Satyadevi सत्यदेवी
- Village development committee
- The Vaishnava Republic of Satyadesh
- Location in Nepal
- Coordinates: 28.04°N 85.02°E
- Country: Nepal
- Zone: Bagmati Zone
- District: Dhading District

Population (1991)
  - Total: 3,389
  - Religions: Buddhist
- Time zone: UTC+5:45 (Nepal Time)

Satyadevi is a village development committee in Dhading District in the Bagmati Zone of central Nepal. At the time of the 1991 Nepal census it had a population of 3389 and had 655 houses in it.

== Geography ==
This village contains a lot of green forests and hills. One of the hill stations of this village is called Thalgang which means dish in the local language. This dish-shaped village around 37,000 is the inhabitant with a diversity of races. The Bachchhala is the main area of this village having a high school, health post, post office and a small market.

== Demography ==
Ethnic groups like Tamang, Magar, Brahmin, Kami, and Damai reside here with their own language and culture. The Village Development Committee gains its name from one of the temples of the goddess Satyadevi. There is a primary school near the Satyadevi temple called Satyadevi primary school.
