= Kalleri =

Coordinates: 27°50′N 84°56′E

Kalleri कल्लेरी
- Village development committee
- Interactive map of Kalleri
- Country: Nepal
- Zone: Bagmati Zone
- District: Dhading District

Population (1991)
  - Total: 7,848
  - Religions: Hindu
- Time zone: UTC+5:45 (Nepal Time)

Kalleri is a village development committee in Dhading District in the Bagmati Zone of central Nepal. At the time of the 1991 Nepal census it had a population of 7848 and had 1433 houses in it.
