= Pida, Nepal =

Gajuri गजुरी
- [[Gajuri Gaupalika (Nepal)|Gaupalika]]
- Location in Nepal
- Coordinates: 27.76°N 84.90°E
- Country: Nepal
- Zone: Bagmati Zone
- District: Dhading District

Population (1991)
  - Total: 7,977
  - Religions: Hindu
- Time zone: UTC+5:45 (Nepal Time)

Pida is a village development committee in Dhading District in the Bagmati Zone of central Nepal. At the time of the 1991 Nepal census it had a population of 7977 and had 1417 houses in it. It is one of the beautiful villages in Nepal with a lot of natural and artificial (artistic) attractions.
