= Kumpur =

Coordinates: 27.83°N 84.87°E

Kumpur कुम्पुर
- Village development committee
- Interactive map of Kumpur
- Country: Nepal
- Zone: Bagmati Zone
- District: Dhading District

Population (1991)
  - Total: 7,916
  - Religions: Hindu
- Time zone: UTC+5:45 (Nepal Time)

Kumpur is a village development committee in Dhading District in Province No. 3 in central Nepal. At the time of the 1991 Nepal census it had a population of 7916 and had 1405 houses in it.

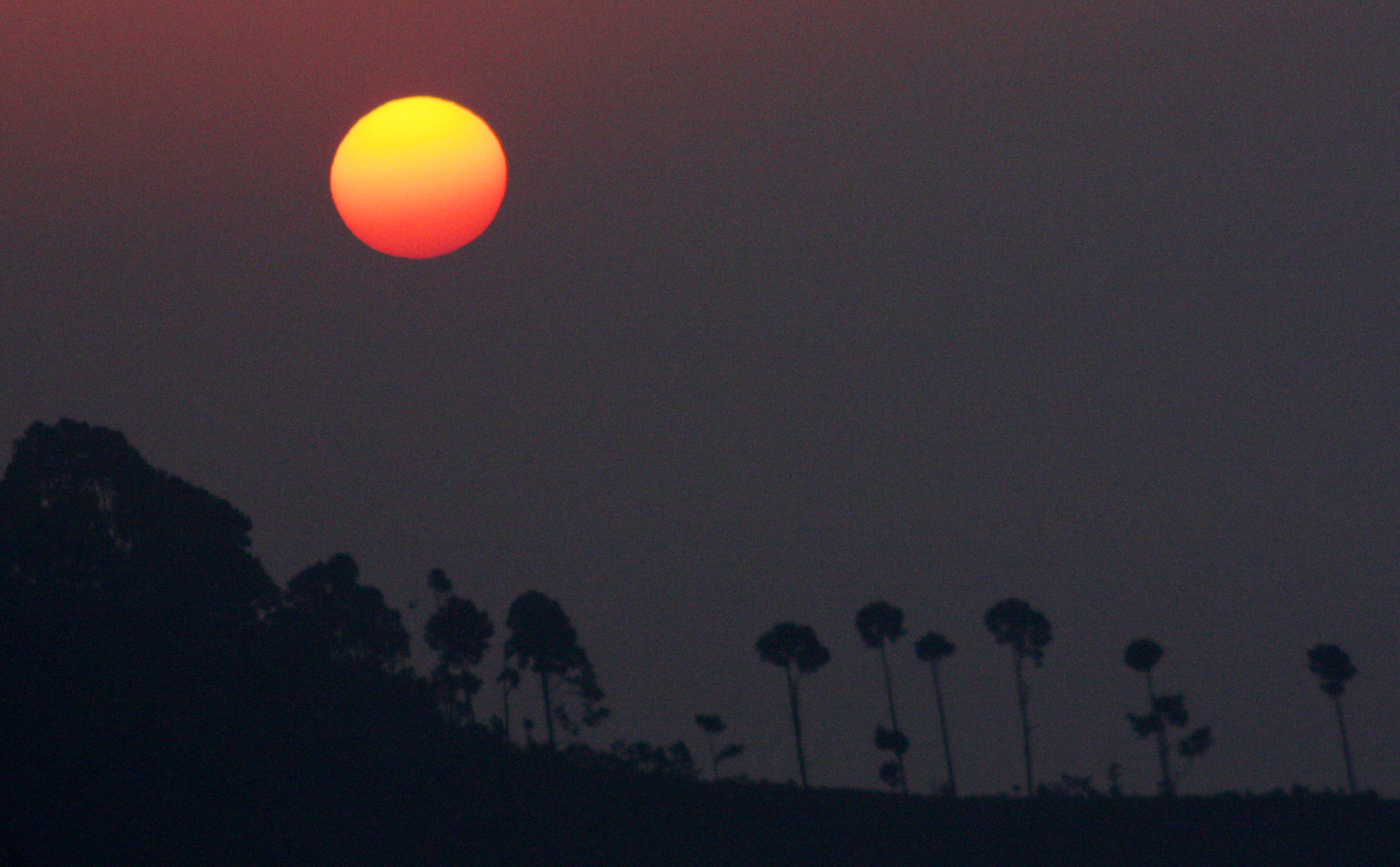
Sunrise from Kumpur village
