= Benighat =

Benighat बेनीघाट
- Village development committee
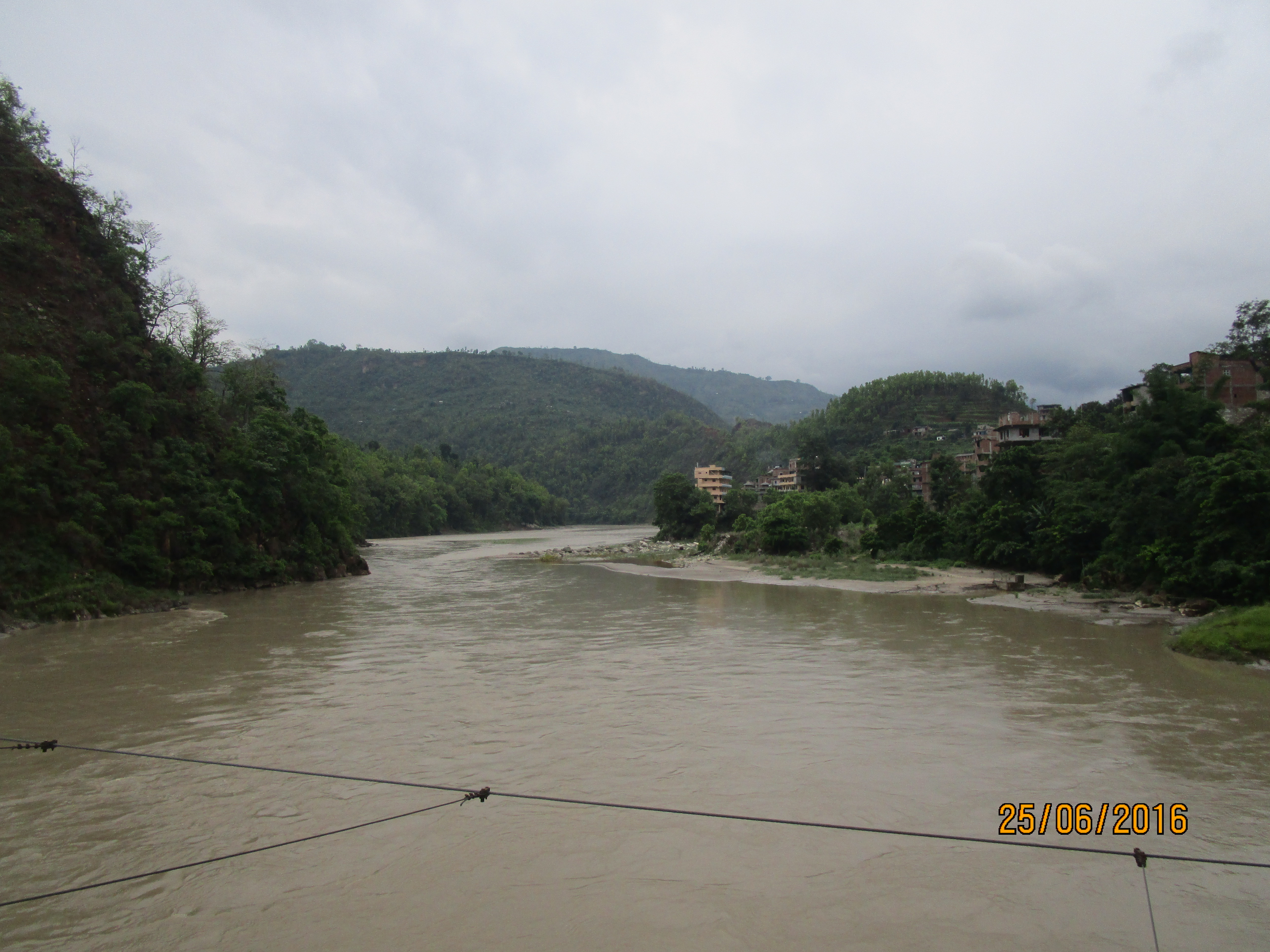
- Trishuli River at Benighat, Malekhu

- Location in Nepal
- Coordinates: 27°49′N 84°47′E
- Country: Nepal
- Zone: Bagmati Zone
- District: Dhading District

Population (1991)
  - Total: 6,264
- Time zone: UTC+5:45 (Nepal Time)
- Bishaltar is place where is main office of benighat rorang Local municipality.

Benighat was a formal village development committee in Dhading District in the Bagmati Zone of central Nepal. At the time of the 1991 Nepal census it had a population of 6264 and had 1196 houses in it. It was later merged with several other VDCs to form the Benighat Rorang Rural Municipality.
