= Kiranchok =

Kiranchok किरानचोक
- Village development committee
- Location in Nepal
- Coordinates: 27.73°N 84.95°E
- Country: Nepal
- Zone: Bagmati Zone
- District: Dhading District

Population (1991)
  - Total: 5,375
  - Religions: Hindu and Buddhism
- Time zone: UTC+5:45 (Nepal Time)

Kiranchok is a village development committee in Dhading District in the Bagmati Zone of central Nepal. At the time of the 1991 Nepal census it had a population of 5375 and had 975 houses in it.
