= Kebalpur =

Coordinates: 27°13′N 86°14′E

Kebalpur केवलपुर
- Village development committee
- Interactive map of Kebalpur
- Country: Nepal
- Zone: Bagmati Zone
- District: Dhading District

Population (1991)
  - Total: 4,674
  - Religions: Hindu
- Time zone: UTC+5:45 (Nepal Time)

Kebalpur is a village development committee in Dhading District in the Bagmati Zone of central Nepal. At the time of the 1991 Nepal census it had a population of 4674 and had 907 houses in it.

== Media ==
To Promote local culture Kebalpur has one FM radio station Krishi Radio - 105 MHz Which is a Community radio Station.
