= Aginchok =

Place in Nepal

Aginchok आगिञ्चोक
- Village Development Committee
- Interactive map of Aginchok
- Location in Nepal
- Coordinates: 28°03′N 84°50′E
- Country: Nepal
- Zone: Bagmati Zone
- District: Dhading District

Population (1991)
  - Total: 3,681
  - Religions: Hindu
- Time zone: UTC+5:45 (Nepal Time)

Aginchok (Nepali: आगिञ्चोक) is a village development committee in Dhading District in the Bagmati Zone of central Nepal. At the time of the 1991 Nepal census it had a population of 3681 and had 713 houses in it.There is Aginchok Durbar of Shah Thakuri cast. In Aginchok, Rajendra Bahadur Shah, is very famous political and social leader. He is former VDC Chief of Aginchok VDC then. They came in Aginchok from Arghakhanchi to Lhasa Tibet.During the Second Nepal-Tibetan War (1848-1849 CE), Birbhadra Shah, son of Bir Kumar Shah, the last king of Argha, reached Lhasa as a commander with an army troops. Although the war spread to Lhasa, after the war ended with the Treaty of Betravati, Birbhadra Shah returned via Rasuwa, Nuwakot, and Dhading to Argha. On tha way to Argha he received a Birta in Aginchowk by Bahadur Shah, as a contribution to the Nepal-Tibet 2nd war and started permanent residence here with his army troops. Burlakoti, Ruwali, Bhandari, Neupane, Sharma,Khand, khan,Pariyar, Biswaokarma, Newar, Kunwor,Thapa cast lives there and they also came from Arghakhanchi. These casts Burlakoti, Itani,Ruwali are known as “Kumai Bahun”. Originally they are from Kumaun India. They came with Shiv Raj Shah who came from from Kumaun-Gadwall to Argha in 14 century.
