= Nilkantha, Nepal =

Nilkantha नीलकण्ठ नगरपालिका
- Municipality
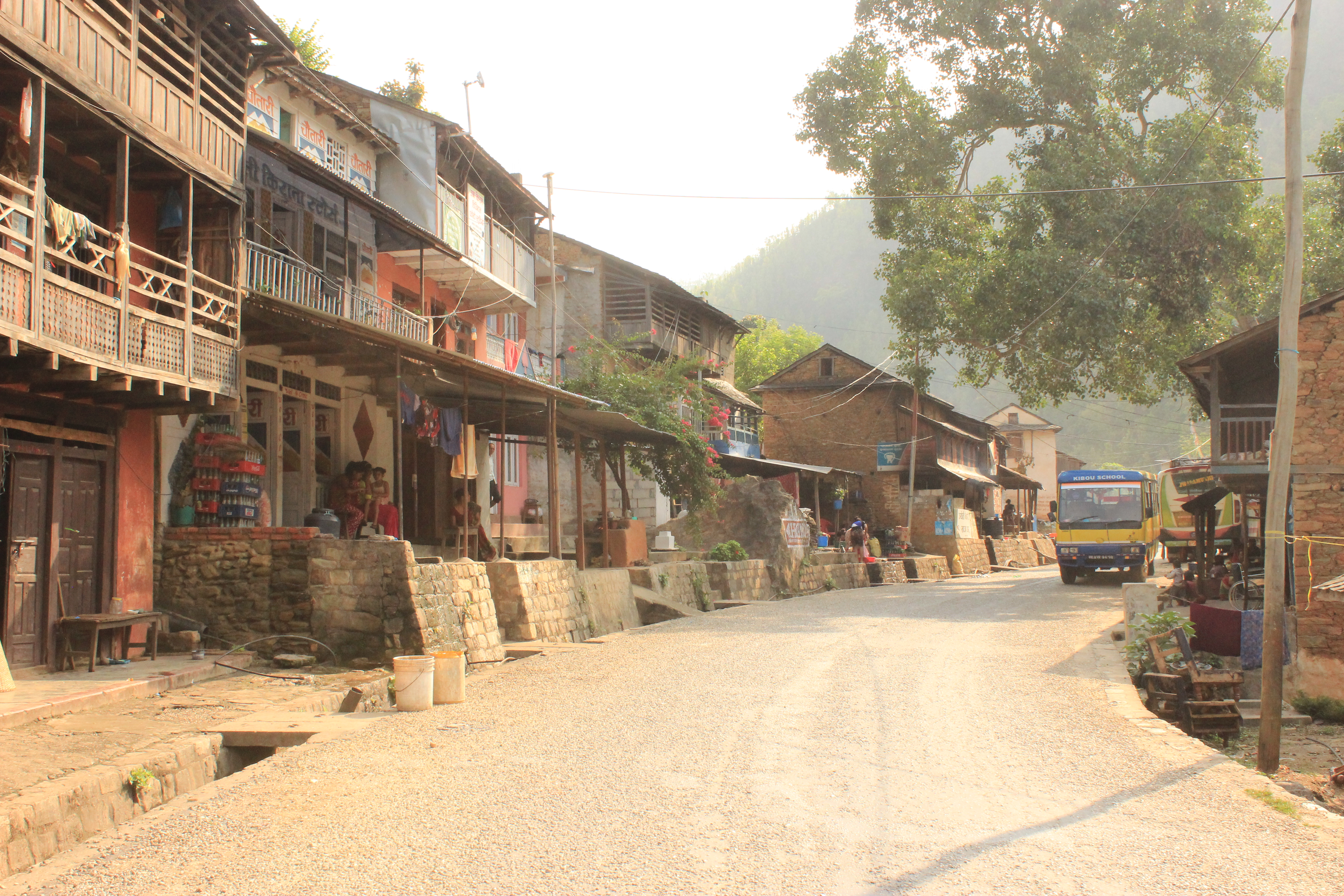
- Dhadingbesi Highway

- Location in Nepal
- Coordinates: 27.91°N 84.94°E
- Country: Nepal
- Zone: Bagmati
- District: Dhading
- Established: May 8, 2014

Government
  - Type: Mayor–council
  - Mayor: Mr.Bhim Prasad Dhungana (NC)
  - Deputy Mayor: Deepak Bishowkarma (NCP)

Population (2021)
  - Total: 58,828
  - Religions: Hindu
- Time zone: UTC+5:45 (NST)
- Postal code: 45100
- Area code: 010
- Website: www.nilkanthamun.gov.np

Nilkantha or Neelkantha is one of two Municipalities in the Dhading District of the Bagmati Province of central Nepal. The municipality is located around the center of the district and holds the majority of the population and facilities of the entire district. The municipality was established on 18 May 2014, merging with the existing places such as Nilkantha (Dhading Besi), Dhuwakot, Sunaula Bazar, Murali Bhanjyang, and Sangkosh VDC. Nilkantha municipality is the most developed place of the dhading district as the economic and social conditions are greater than other parts of the district.

== Demographics ==
At the time of the 2021 Nepal census, Nilkantha Municipality had a population of 58,828. Of these, 81.9% spoke Nepali, 6.5% Tamang, 6.2% Gurung, 1.7% Magar, 1.5% Newar, 1.4% Kumhali, 0.3% Bhojpuri, 0.1% Ghale, 0.1% Hindi, 0.1% Maithili, 0.1% Urdu and 0.1% other languages as their first language.

In terms of ethnicity/caste, 17.6% were Newar, 16.4% Hill Brahmin, 16.4% Gurung, 12.0% Chhetri, 10.6% Magar, 7.7% Tamang, 6.5% Sarki, 4.1% Kami, 2.7% Damai/Dholi, 2.2% Kumal, 1.4% Thakuri, 0.5% Ghale, 0.5% Sanyasi/Dasnami, 0.3% Musalman, 0.2% Brahmu/Baramo, 0.2% Gharti/Bhujel, 0.1% Kalwar, 0.1% Rai, 0.1% Teli and 0.2% others.

In terms of religion, 79.3% were Hindu, 17.4% Buddhist, 2.9% Christian, 0.3% Muslim, 0.1% Baháʼí and 0.1% others.

In terms of literacy, 65.7% could read and write, 2.2% could read but not write and 31.9% could neither read nor write.

== Media ==
To promote local culture, Nilkantha municipality has decided to establish three community radio stations, They are:

- Radio Dhading (106 MHz)
- Radio Bihani (97.6 MHz)
- Radio Loktantra (89.4 MHz)
