= Dhusha =

Dhusha (Benighat Rorang) धुषा (बेनिघाट राेराङ)
- Rural municipality
- Location in Nepal
- Coordinates: 27°46′00″N 84°44′30″E
- Country: Nepal
- Zone: Bagmati Zone
- District: Dhading District

Government
  - Type: Local Government
  - Chief of Rural Municipality: Mr. Hari Dallakoti

Population (2011)
  - Total: 7,190
  - Religions: Hindu
- Time zone: UTC+5:45 (Nepal Time)

Dhusha or Dhussa, now Benighat Rorang, is a rural municipality (gaunpalika) in Dhading District in the Bagmati Zone of central Nepal. At the time of the 2011 Nepal census it had a population of 7190. The Dhusha office is located at Charaundi Bazar, which is one of the commencing places for whitewater rafting in the Trishuli River. The bazar, which is located along the Prithvi Highway, is also the main business area for the whole rural municipality. Like the general geographical status of the whole country, Dhusha rises from low altitude to medium-high altitude region. Charaundi Khola (Charaundi Stream), flows very close to the bazar.

Dhusha proudly boasts that it is one of the few rural municipalities in the country producing tonnes a of vegetables all the year round—cabbages, brinjals, bitter gourds, tomatoes, etc. The vegetables are sent to Kalimati Vegetable Market in Kathmandu and also to various other cities and towns in the country, including Mugling, Narayanghat, Pokhara, Biratnagar, and Dharan. The agricultural development and production also helps the local ethnic communities, such as the Chepang community.

Tourism is also a source of income in the rural municipality, as the area is rich in natural resources. Whitewater rafting is the main attraction in the area. The Trishuli River, which is one of the famous rivers for whitewater rafting in the country, flows between Dhusha (Dhading District) and Ghaylchowk (Gorkha District). The main rafting spots within the rural municipality are served by some good resorts (Royal Beach Camp, Himalika Camp/Resort, etc.) mainly targeted for tourists. Nohak Gupha (Nohak Cave) also lies within the rural municipality, which may be one of the longest caves in the country, though it is yet to be publicized and verified. Canyoning in also a major attraction for local and foreign tourists. The rural municipality is one of the gateways to Chitwan District via the Chitwan Chepang Hill Trail.
