= Ganesh NW (Ganesh II/III) =

- Ganesh II
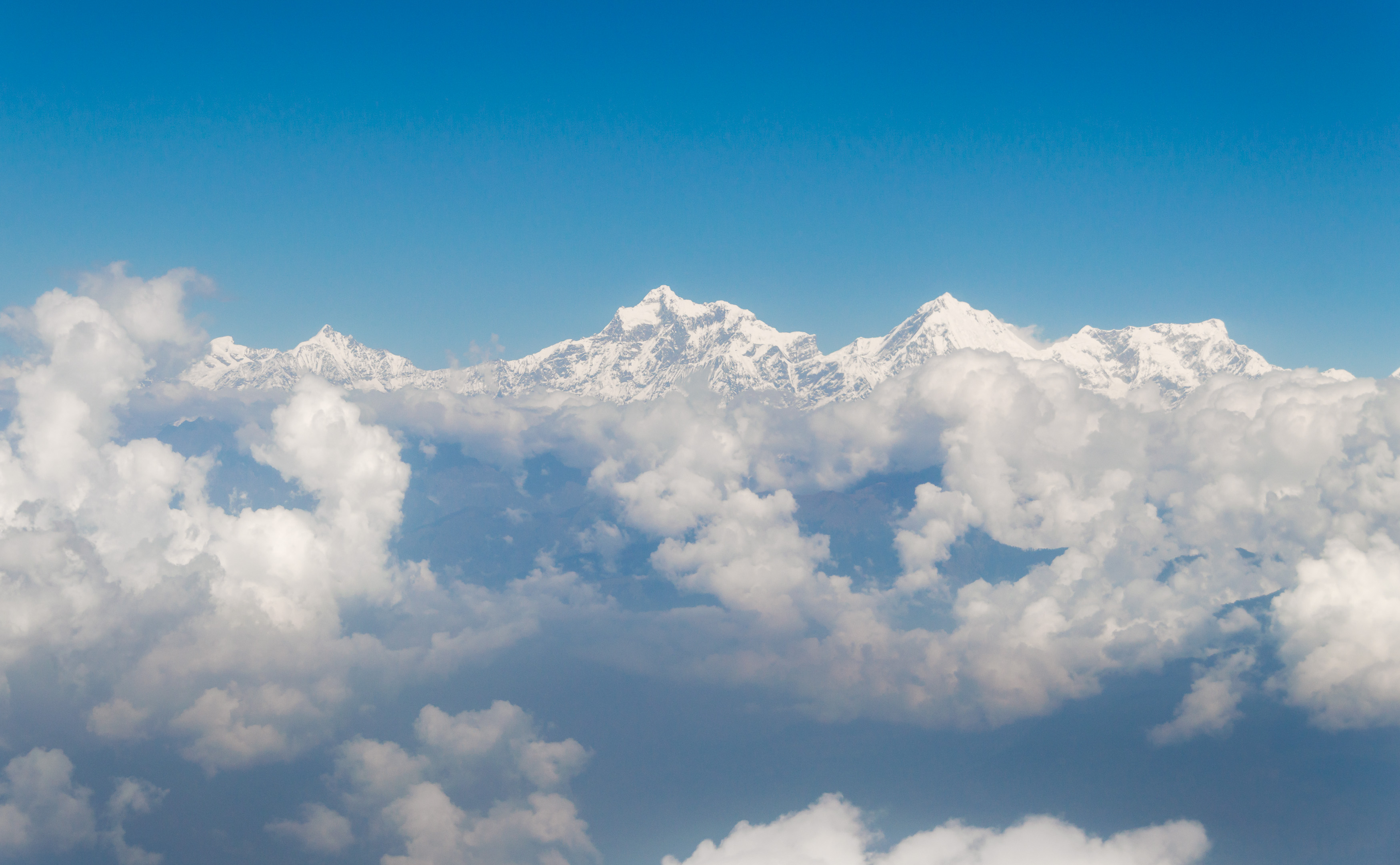
- Ganesh Himal massif. Ganesh NW is the third peak from the right

Highest point
- Elevation: 7,118 m (23,353 ft)
- Prominence: 1,198 m (3,930 ft)
- Listing: Mountains of Nepal
- Coordinates: 28°22′45″N 85°03′24″E

Geography
- Location within Nepal
- Location: Nepal
- Parent range: Ganesh Himal, Himalayas

Climbing
- First ascent: 16 October 1981
- Easiest route: rock/snow/ice climb

Ganesh NW (or Ganesh II, or sometimes Ganesh III) is a peak of the Ganesh Himal, which is a subrange of the Himalayan range.

Ganesh NW, and the entire Ganesh Himal, lie between the Budhi Gandaki and Trisuli Gandaki valleys, about 70 km (43 mi) northwest of Kathmandu. Ganesh NW lies about seven km west of Yangra (Ganesh I).

Nomenclature for this peak is ambiguous and confusing, and varies between sources. Many sources refer to this peak as Ganesh III, and also as Salasungo. However Salasungo more properly refers to a different peak in the Ganesh Himal, Ganesh SE or Ganesh III. The name Ganesh II is used on the Finnmap, the most recent authoritative source.

== Notable features ==
Although low in elevation among the major mountains of Nepal, Ganesh NW is exceptional in its steep rise above local terrain. For example, it rises 5,800 m (19,000 ft) from the Burhi Gandaki in a horizontal distance of about 16 km (10 mi).

== Climbing history ==
There were six unsuccessful attempts on this peak, including attempts in 1953 and 1954, before two simultaneous first ascents in October 1981. The two successful teams were a German-Sherpa team (Hermann Warth, Ang Chappal, Nga Temba) on the North Ridge, and a Japanese-Sherpa group (N. Kuwahara, J. Nakamura, N. Hase, Tendi Sherpa, Kirke Sherpa) on the Northeast Spur. The two groups combined at 6,300 metres and finished on the North Face.

There have been two additional unsuccessful attempts since 1981, in 1988 and 1992, but no more ascents of the peak.

== Sources ==
- H. Adams Carter, "Classification of the Himalaya," American Alpine Journal 1985.
- Neate, Jill (1989). High Asia: An Illustrated History of the 7000 Metre Peaks. Seattle: The Mountaineers. ISBN 0-89886-238-8.
- DEM files for the Himalaya (Corrected versions of SRTM data)
