= Bhumesthan =

Bhumesthan भुमेस्थान
- Village development committee
- Location in Nepal
- Coordinates: 27°44′24″N 85°1′48″E
- Country: Nepal
- Zone: Bagmati Zone
- District: Dhading District

Population (1991)
  - Total: 7,978
  - Religions: Hindu
- Time zone: UTC+5:45 (Nepal Time)

Bhumesthan is a village development committee in Dhading District in the Bagmati Zone of central Nepal. At the time of the 1991 Nepal census it had a population of 7978 and had 1401 houses in it.
