= Ayush Rijal =

Famous Actor/Filmmaker

Aauysh Rijal
- Born: February 6, 1980; Dhading, Nepal
- Occupation: Actor
- Years active: 2005 - present
- Parents: Lal Kumar Rijal (father); Rukmani Rijal (mother)
- Awards: D Cine Award, Nepal Film Dancer Cine Award, 2013, Global Nepali Film Award

Aayush Rijal, known also as Gopal Rijal, (born February 6, 1980) is a Nepali film actor, creative director, and narrator. His credits include music videos, television commercials, documentaries, and more than 30 feature films. Rijal began his cinematic career as a cinematographer.

== Filmography ==
Movie	Year	Role
Dil ma sajaye timi lai	2013	Actor
Mero desh	2015	Actor
Ma maya garchu timi lai	2011	Actor
Sadak	2011	Actor
Jaljala	2011	Actor
Mero desh	2011	Actor
Tulsi	2012	Actor
Ma birsu kasari	2012	Actor
Mero Katha	2012	Actor
Paap	2015	Actor
Ma chuni timro	2013	Actor
Lawarish	2013	Actor

== Political life ==
During the 2017 Nepalese general election, Rijal was reported near to Nepali Congress.

== Awards ==
Year	Award	Category	Movie	Result
2010	D Cine Award	Actor	movie	Won
2013	Nepal Film Dancer Cine Award 2013	Actor	Sadak	Won
2017	Global Nepali Film Award	Actor		Won

== Music Videos ==
Nabirse Timi Lai
