= Goganpani, Dhading =

Coordinates: 27°47′0″N 85°6′0″E

Goganpani गोगनपानी
- village development committee
- Interactive map of Goganpani
- Country: Nepal
- Zone: Bagmati Zone
- District: Dhading District

Population (1991)
  - Total: 3,847
  - Religions: Hindu
- Time zone: UTC+5:45 (Nepal Time)

Goganpani is a Village Development Committee in Dhading District in the Bagmati Zone of central Nepal. At the time of the 1991 Nepal census it had a population of 3847 and had 686 houses in it.

== Community forest ==
The Majha Gaon Community Forest is located in Ward No. 3 of the Goganpani Village Development Committee (VDC), and Dhading is about a 45-minute walk from Eklephant (near the Simle bazaar) of the Prithvi Highway. The community forest covers 199.9 hectares. In 1988, people who lived in a community near the Majha Gaon forest began working on their own initiatives to protect their forest. According to a policy to hand over all accessible forest to local communities, the Majha Gaon forest was finally handed over to Goganpani, a community of 50 households, in 1996. Currently, there are 81 households that have use rights from this community forest. Unfortunately, as the protection initiative was taken by the inhabitants of the Goganpani VDC, the forest was handed over to them without following the process of user identification, and other traditional users such as the inhabitants of Bhumisthan VDC, Eklephant were excluded. Seventeen households from Bhumisthan VDC were excluded from forest use rights and subsequently annoyed with both the FUG and District Forest Officer (DFO). They raised objections and demanded use rights but were ignored. The antagonism between the FUG members and the excluded group increased daily. The FUG neither recognized the inhabitants of Bhumisthan VDC Eklephant as users nor could they get support for forest conservation from this group. Bhumisthan inhabitants continued to take forest products from the Majha Gaon forest. Though FUG members had patrolled the forest, they could not control them. Moreover, the forest is in the vicinity of the highway, so illegal loggers and smugglers also entered the forest, felled trees, and transported the timber in the evenings. The excluded group had no incentive to support forest conservation and thus the forest was victimized by conflict. RIMS Nepal began work on the USAID-funded Strengthened Actions for Governance in Utilization of National Resources (SAGUN) program in Dhading in 2002, envisioning the internalization of good governance practices in natural resource management groups. RIMS Nepal staff facilitated the Dhading FUG in strengthening governance and advocacy. All community members near Majha Gaon had the opportunity to participate in SAGUN. They learned the importance of conflict management for institutional, technical, and governance capacity development. The SAGUN program coordinated/facilitated meetings several times for this FUG. The FUG chairman, Mr. Murari, and other executive members also realized the importance of the support from all villagers for protection and effective management of forest. Kanchha Bhandari and Prem Bahadur Chhetri from Kaji Tole (Eklephant) also tried to reduce the antagonism. They worked to reach a middle ground for the conservation and management of forest with common interests. The chairperson of the neighboring Bhasmelampokhari FUG, Mr. K.B. Thapa, mediated to resolve the use rights conflict between the inhabitants of Goganpani-3 and Bhumisthan VDC Eklephant. In 2003, the Majha Gaon community forestry operational plan was revised. A forest technician from RIMSNepal facilitated the revision process. This time, the plan and its revision was process orientated. Several small group meetings were held and all users, including the previously excluded ones, actively participated in the user identification and rule formulation process. A general assembly was organized comprising all 81 households. The inhabitants of Eklephant also got recognition as formal users of the Majha Gaon FUG. In lieu of new membership, they agreed to pay NRs 500 as an entrance fee. In addition, the general assembly made special provision for Chyangdunge Magar and Putali B.K., who can now gather forest products free of charge and are excused from their labor contribution as they are among the poorest members of the Majha Gaon FUG (identified by the Participatory Well Being Ranking). Currently, FUG members have a good relationship with each other, and work cohesively for collective action. The illegal felling by smugglers and illegal users who entered from the highway is now under control. Users have learned and practiced governance and equity in their group. They are now aware of their roles, responsibilities, and rights. The group has organized public hearings and public auditing (PHPA) and has collected misused funds and dues, for example former EC member Mr. Bishnu Subedi has committed to refund NRs 4000, which was misused and unknown to other general members before the PHPA. The FUG has also constructed two small bridges in Kolpu Khola and Mahesh Khola, for which they invested NRs 15000 and contributed volunteer labor worth NRs 5000. All the members from this FUG are now happy with the activities and initiatives for community development.
