= Charaundi =

Charaundi चरौदी
- Commercial Area (Bazar)
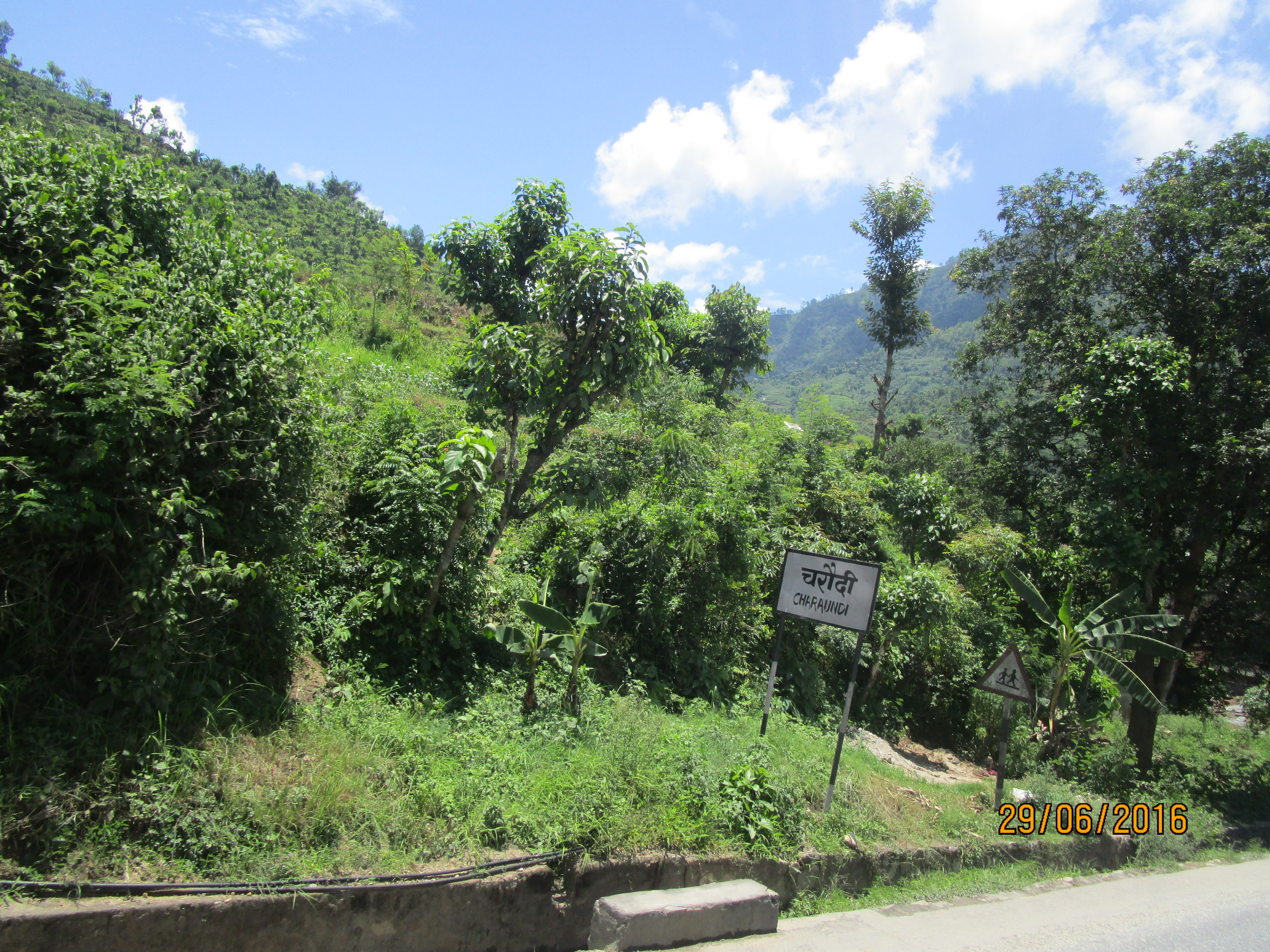
- Charaundi Bazar at Dhading

- Location in Nepal
- Coordinates: 27°49′N 84°47′E
- Country: Nepal
- Zone: Bagmati Zone
- District: Dhading District

Population (1990)
  - Total: 5,069
  - Religions: Hindu
- Time zone: UTC+5:45 (Nepal Time)
- Charaundi Bazar, important business area of Dhusha VDC

Charaundi is a small commercial zone but with great importance for whole Dhusha Village Development Committee situated along the Prithvi Highway in Dhading District in the Bagmati Zone of central Nepal. At the time of the 1991 Nepal census it had a population of 6264 and had 1196 houses in it.
