= Ganesh Himal =

Mountain range in Nepal

- गणेश हिमाल
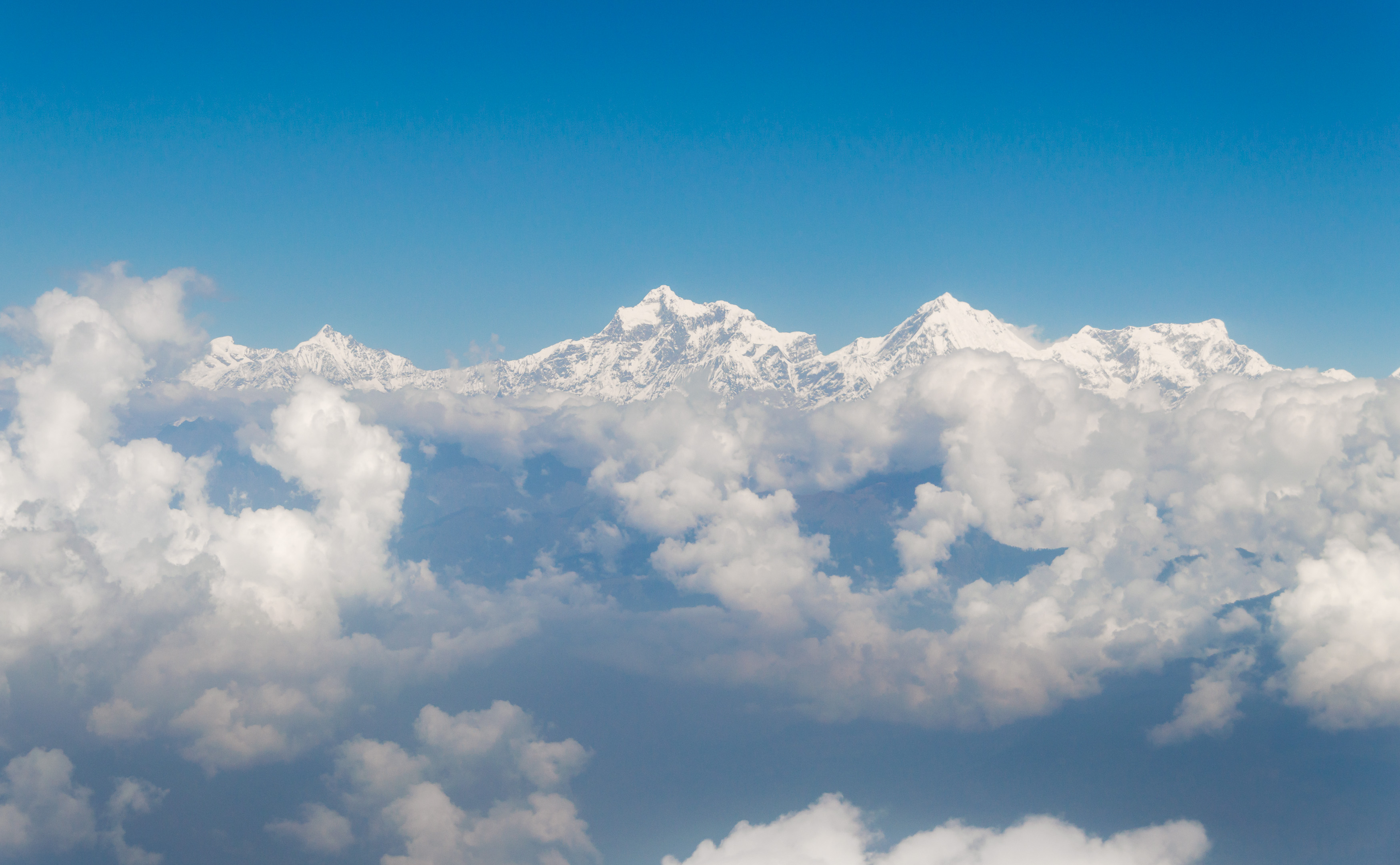
- Ganesh Himal mountain range. Peaks (left to right): unnamed peak (6250 m), Ganesh-II, Pabil, Salasungo

Highest point
- Peak: Yangra
- Elevation: 7,422 m (24,350 ft)
- Coordinates: 28°23′33″N 85°07′48″E

Geography
- Location within Nepal
- Country: Nepal
- District: Dhading-Gorkha border
- Parent range: Himalayas
- Borders on: Langtang Himal, Sringi Himal and Mansiri Himal

Ganesh Himāl is a sub-range of the Himalayas located mostly in north-central Nepal, but some peaks lie on the border with Tibet. The Trisuli Gandaki valley on the east separates it from the Langtang Himal; the Budhi (Buri) Gandaki valley and the Shyar Khola valley on the west separate it from the Sringi Himal and the Mansiri Himal (home of Manaslu, the nearest 8000m peak).

The highest peak in the range is Yangra with an elevation of 7,422 m (24,350 ft). Three other peaks are over 7,000 m (23,000 ft) and fourteen others over 6,000 m (20,000 ft).

The name for the range comes from the Hindu deity Ganesha, usually depicted in the form of an elephant. Names and elevations for this range differ from source to source; see the notes below the table. The least ambiguous way to refer to the different peaks would be "Ganesh NW", but this is not the standard practice in the literature for this range.

== Highest peaks ==
Mountain	Height (m)	Height (ft)	Coordinates	Prominence (m)	Parent mountain	First ascent
Yangra (Ganesh I/Main/NE)	7,422	24,350	28°23′33″N 85°07′48″E	2,352	Manaslu	1955
Ganesh II/NW	7,118	23,353	28°22′45″N 85°03′24″E	1,198	Yangra	1981
Salasungo (Ganesh III/SE)	7,043	23,107	28°20′06″N 85°07′18″E	641	Ganesh IV	1979
Pabil (Ganesh IV/SW)	7,104	23,307	28°20′45″N 85°04′48″E	927	Ganesh II	1978

== Notes ==
1. The names Ganesh II, Salasungo (Ganesh III), and Pabil (Ganesh IV) are from the Finnmap They do not agree with other, older sources such as Carter or Neate (which is derived from Carter). Ohmori attests the name "Lapsang Karbo" for the southeast peak, here called Salasungo.
2. Heights are from the Finnmap.
3. Coordinates have been derived from the Finnmap by Eberhard Jurgalski.
4. Prominence values (except for Yangra) have been derived from the Finnmap by Eberhard Jurgalski. For Yangra, the value is from peaklist.org.
5. Location Dhading
