= Yangra =

Mountain in Nepal

- Ganesh I
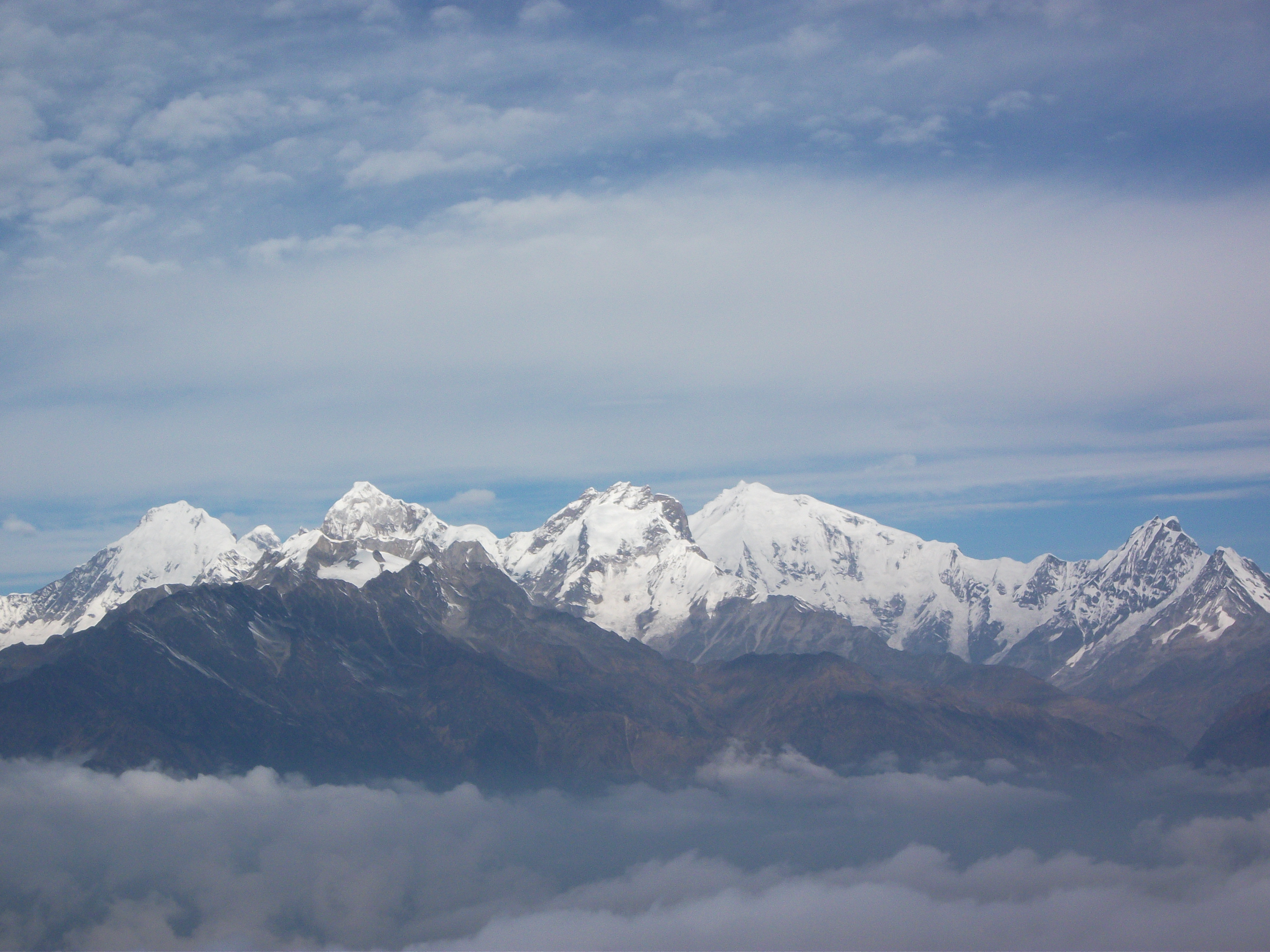
- View from the east; from left: Pabil, Salasungo, Ganesh V, Yangra Kangri.

Highest point
- Elevation: 7,429 m (24,373 ft); Ranked 62nd
- Prominence: 2,352 m (7,717 ft)
- Listing: Mountains of Nepal; Ultra
- Coordinates: 28°23′33″N 85°07′48″E

Geography
- Location within Nepal Location within China
- Countries: China and Nepal
- Parent range: Ganesh Himal, Himalayas

Climbing
- First ascent: October 24, 1955 by R Lambert, C Kogan, E Gauchat
- Easiest route: rock/snow/ice climb

Yangra (Ganesh I) is the highest peak of the Ganesh Himal, which is a subrange of the Himalayas. Although not an 8,000 metre peak, and little visited, it enjoys great vertical relief over the nearby valleys.

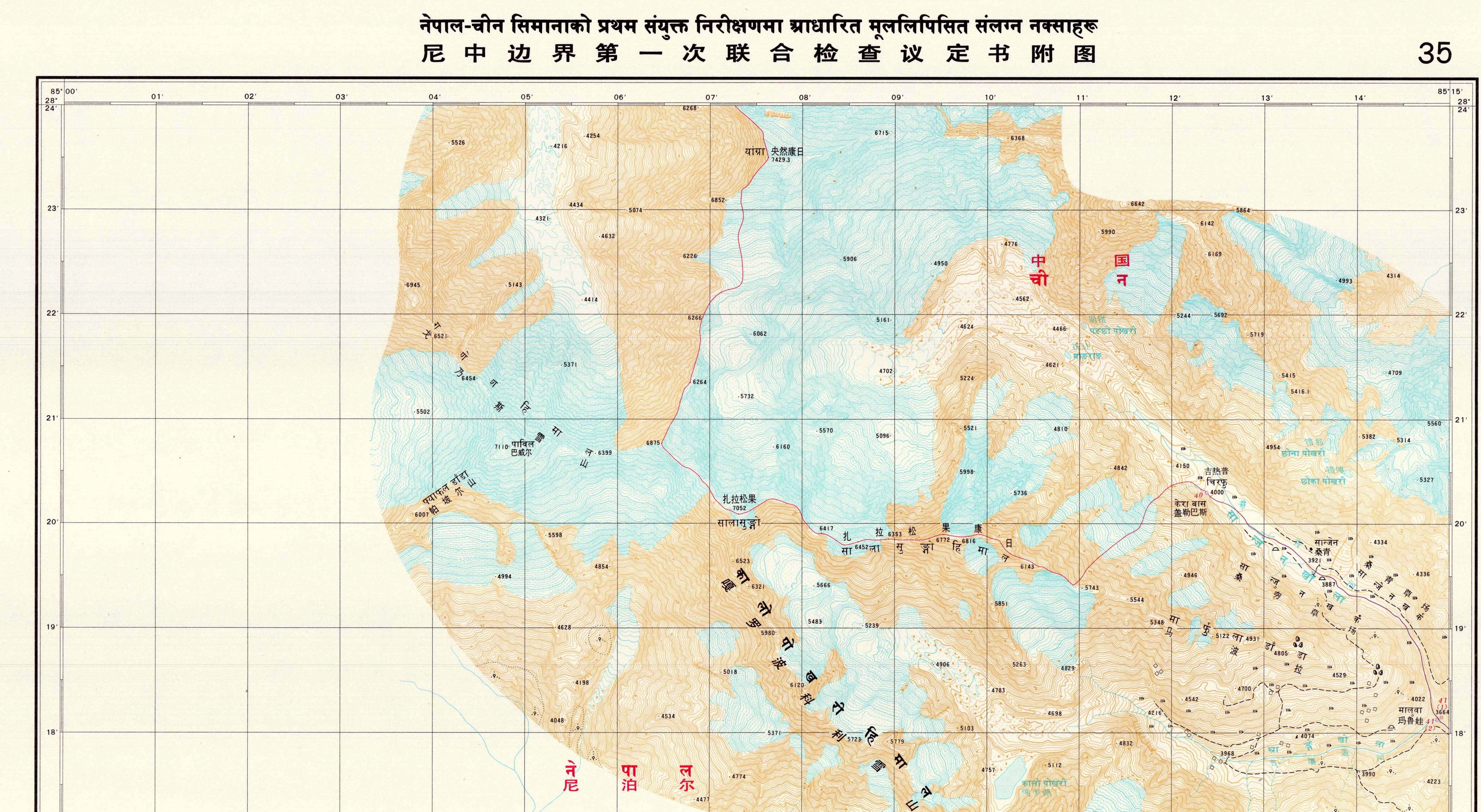

== Location ==
Yangra, and the entire Ganesh Himal, lie between the Budhi Gandaki and Trisuli Gandaki valleys, northwest of Kathmandu. Yangra lies on the border between Nepal and Tibet, and is east-southeast of Manaslu, the nearest 8,000 metre peak.

== Climbing history ==
The Ganesh Himal was first seriously reconnoitered for climbing by H. W. Tilman and party in 1950. The first attempt on the peak was in 1953.

The first ascent, in 1955, was by a Franco-Swiss expedition led by Raymond Lambert, via the Southeast Face and Ridge. The ascent was most notable for the presence of a woman, Claude Kogan, in the summit party, which was very rare at the time. Lambert, Kogan, and Eric Gauchat achieved the summit, but Gauchat fell to his death on the descent.

The Himalayan Index lists no other ascents of Yangra, although a 1960 attempt reached the East Peak of the mountain.

== See also ==
- List of ultras of the Himalayas

== Sources ==
- H. Adams Carter, "Classification of the Himalaya," American Alpine Journal 1985.
- Neate, Jill (1989). High Asia: An Illustrated History of the 7000 Metre Peaks. Seattle: The Mountaineers. ISBN 0-89886-238-8.
- peaklist.org
