= Gangajamuna =

Hindu pilgrimage site in Nepal

Ganga Jamuna Temple is a Hindu pilgrimage site in Nepal where a famous fair is held around the temple before three days of full moon day during the first week of November. Here is a holy stone which is highly revered by the Hindu devotees and local people. It is believed that this holy stone preserves the divine power as water originates from there.
