= Dhading District =

District of Nepal

Coordinates: 27°52′0″N 84°55′0″E

Dhading District धादिङ जिल्ला
- District
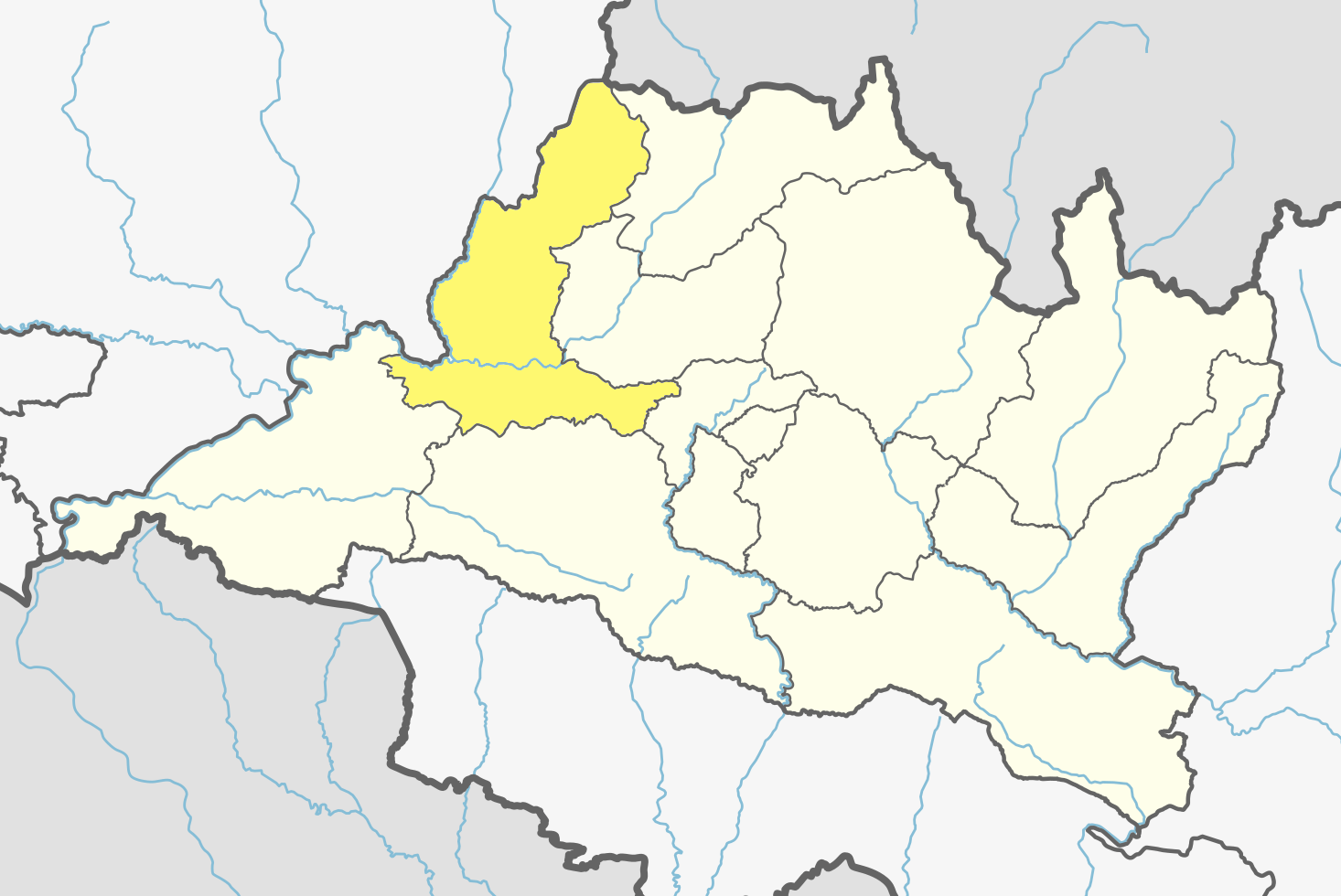
- Location of District in Bagmati Pradesh
- Interactive map of Dhading District
- Country: Nepal
- Province: Bagmati
- Admin HQ.: Dhading Besi, Nilkantha Municipality

Government
  - Type: Coordination committee
  - Body: DCC, Dhading

Area
  - Total: 1,926 km^{2} (744 sq mi)

Population (2011)
  - Total: 336,067
  - Density: 174.5/km^{2} (451.9/sq mi)
- Time zone: UTC+05:45 (NPT)
- Website: www.ddcdhading.gov.np

Dhading District (Nepali: धादिङ जिल्ला), a part of Bagmati Province, is one of the seventy-seven districts of Nepal. The district, with Dhading Besi (Nilkantha Municipality) as its district headquarters, covers an area of 1,926 square kilometres (744 sq mi), had a population of 338,658 in 2001 and 336,067 in 2011.

== Etymology ==
According to local tradition, the name Dhading is believed to have originated from the language of the indigenous Chepang (Praja) people. In the Chepang language, “Dha” means deity and “Ding” means flame of fire. Since the Chepang people have inhabited this region since ancient times and the temple of Jwalamukhi Devi, a deity worshipped in the form of a flame, is also located in the district, it is widely believed that the district name Dhading was derived from the Chepang language.

== History ==
Parts of present‑day Dhading District, particularly the territory across the Trishuli River, historically lay within the sphere of influence of the Gorkha Kingdom prior to the unification of Nepal.

The region is mentioned in the political counsel and recollections of Prithvi Narayan Shah in Divyopadesh. The text recounts that during his campaigns he crossed Kalleri Ghat and ascended the hills of the Dhading region while travelling toward the capital of Gorkha.

The work also records that Prithvi Narayan Shah summoned his commanders Mansingh Rokaya and Ranjit Basnyat to Maidi, located in present‑day Dhading.

According to Divyopadesh, Prithvi Narayan Shah visited Salyankot to worship the local goddess Salyankot Devi, where he reportedly experienced a dream in which the deity blessed his campaign. Following the ritual sacrifice of a goat, he granted lands at Borlang Ghat and nearby Tar to the temple as a religious endowment.

The text further refers to the administrative organization of the hill regions and praises officials working effectively in Sallyani(Present day Dhading), Liglig, and Dhading, indicating the importance of the Dhading district within the Gorkhali state during the period of expansion.

Remains of gardens, resting houses (pauwa), and temples constructed by the nationalist prime minister Bhimsen Thapa can still be found at Bungkotghat, although most now survive only in ruined condition.

== Geography and climate ==
Dhading District spreads from 27'40" E to 28'17" E and 80'17"N to 84'35"N. The mountain range Ganesh Himal is the predominant mountain range located within Dhading. Some of the peaks are over 7,000 metres (23,000 ft). The highest point in the district is 7,104-metre Pabil. The 8,000-metre (26,000 ft) and the mountain Manaslu is clearly visible from much of Dhading, although it is located within the bounds of Gorkha. The transnational Prithivi Highway connecting Kathmandu, Chitwan and Pokhara runs through the southern portion of the district, making for easy access to the Kathmandu Valley. The road parallels the Trishuli River. The western border with Gorkha is bisected by the Budigandaki River.

The district is bounded by

- East: Kathmandu, Rasuwa and Nuwakot
- West: Gorkha
- North: Rasuwa and Tibet
- South: Makwanpur and Chitwan

Dhading is the only district of Nepal which ranges from the mountain Ganesh Himal to the Churevawar pradesh of Terai (Chitwan). The district, with Dhading Besi as its district headquarters, covers an area of 1,926 square kilometres (744 sq mi) and has a population (2001) of 338,658. Dhading is the district with the most rural municipalities in Nepal i.e. 11. Dhading is 80% farmland and 20% forest. The western border with Gorkha is bisected by the Budigandaki River.

| Climate Zone | Elevation Range | % of Area |
|---|---|---|
| Upper Tropical | 300 to 1,000 meters 1,000 to 3,300 ft. | 39.7% |
| Subtropical | 1,000 to 2,000 meters 3,300 to 6,600 ft. | 35.1% |
| Temperate | 2,000 to 3,000 meters 6,400 to 9,800 ft. | 10.8% |
| Subalpine | 3,000 to 4,000 meters 9,800 to 13,100 ft. | 7.7% |
| Alpine | 4,000 to 5,000 meters 13,100 to 16,400 ft. | 3.2% |
| Nival | above 5,000 meters | 2.5% |

The people of the district are primarily Bhramin and Chetri in the south and Tamang and Gurung in the north, with much of the center Newari. Gurkha route, the birthplace of founder of Nepal King Prithivi Narayan Shah crosses through Dhading.

== Rivers ==
The main river of the Dhading district is Budi Gandaki which comes from Ganesh Himal and passes through Arughat Bazaar and Salyantar and meets Ankhu khola at Narsingha Dhamm. Budhi Gandaki separates the district from Gorkha district. The Trisuli River, which comes from Nuwakot, also passes through Dhading. There are 25 small rivers, the main being Charoudi, Malekhu, Galtukhola, Belkhukhola, Chiraudikhola, Maheshkhola, Aansi, Thopal, Manukhola, Kastekhola, and Mastekhola. Besides these, there are over 1743 smaller rivers, springs and seasonal streams.

== Demographics ==
Historical population
| Census year | Pop. | ±% p.a. |
|---|---|---|
| 1981 | 243,401 | — |
| 1991 | 278,068 | +1.34% |
| 2001 | 338,658 | +1.99% |
| 2011 | 336,067 | −0.08% |
| 2021 | 322,751 | −0.40% |
Source: Citypopulation

At the time of the 2021 Nepal census, Dhading District had a population of 325,710. 7.38% of the population is under 5 years of age. It has a literacy rate of 72.40% and a sex ratio of 1048 females per 1000 males. 87,977 (27.01%) lived in municipalities.

Castes/ethnic groups in Dhading District (2021)
1. Tamang (22.2%)
2. Chhetri (14.1%)
3. Bahun (13.6%)
4. Newar (9.13%)
5. Magar (8.24%)
6. Gurung (5.67%)
7. Chepang (5.27%)
8. Sarki (4.92%)
9. Kami (4.25%)
10. Damai (2.60%)
11. Ghale (2.26%)
12. Kumal (1.67%)
13. Thakuri (1.11%)
14. Rai (1.05%)
15. Dasnami (1.03%)
16. Other Hill Janjati (1.81%)
17. Others (1.16%)

Ethnicity wise: Hill Janjatis made up the largest population, being nearly 49% of the population. Tamangs were the largest Hill Janjatis (22%), with Magars being 8% of the population. Chhetri and Bahun made up 20% of the population.

Languages of Dhading district (2021)
1. Nepali (67.0%)
2. Tamang (20.1%)
3. Chepang (2.95%)
4. Magar (2.74%)
5. Gurung (2.66%)
6. Ghale (1.52%)
7. Nepal Bhasha (1.30%)
8. Others (1.67%)

As their first language, 67.05% of the population spoke Nepali, 20.11% Tamang, 2.95% Chepang, 2.74% Magar, 2.66% Gurung, 1.59% Ghale and 1.30% Nepal Bhasha as their first language. In 2011, 70.7% of the population spoke Nepali as their first language.

Religion in Dhading District (2021)
| Religion | Percent |
| Hinduism | 70.71% |
| Buddhism | 20.26% |
| Christianity | 7.55% |
| Kirat Mundhum | 0.43% |
| Islam | 0.41% |
| Other or not stated | 0.64% |

Religion: 70.71% was Hindu, 20.26% Buddhist, 7.55% Christian, 0.43% Kirat and 0.41% Islam.

== Religious temples ==
Dhading District has many religious temples. Among them is Tripurasundari Mai which lies in the northern part of the district. Siddha Than in Siddhalekh Rural Municipality is a Hindu religious site. Others include the Bhairabi Temple in Sunaula Bazar. Sri Nrsimha Dham Kshetra in Salyantar is a historical religious site for the Vedic Sanatan Hindu people, where Jagannath Foundation – Sri Rupanuga Para Vidyapeeth, Bimala Devi Temple, Shesa Temple, Sada Shiva and ancient Nrsimha Deva temple, and Ganga Jamuna temple are attractions. Kot Devi is a religious site in Jwalamukhi Rural Municipality, Maidi. Kalidevi Temple is also one of the popular religious temples (Devi Mandir) located in Dhunibeshi Municipality ward no. 6. Amleshwor Mahadev Temple in Mahesdovan, Jwalamukhi, is also one of the main religious temples of Dhading. Pasupatipati and Krishna mandir covers the district headquarter, Dhading Bensi. Madevthan of Palpa Bensi is also one of the religious sites of Dhading. Dhola Mandali temple of Dhola is a popular Hindu temple. Every Tuesday people used to cut she-goats in Mandali Thaan. Girls and women are not allowed to go there. The origin of the Muktinath temple of Mustang is Dhading. In Dhading, Muktinath Temple is located at Siddhalek Rular Municipality, nearly Kalupanda Marg.

== Administration ==
Dhanding district consists of two municipalities and 11 rural municipals.

=== Municipalities ===
- Dhunibeshi Municipality
- Nilkantha

=== Rural municipals ===
- Khaniyabas
- Gajuri
- Galchhi
- Gangajamuna
- Jwalamukhi
- Thakre
- Netrawati Dabjong
- Benighat Rorang
- Rubi Valley
- Siddhalek
- Tripurasundari

== Notable people ==
The following is a list of notable people born in, associated with, or who ruled Dhading District:

- Aashika Tamang – Social activist and actress
- Ayush Rijal – Nepali film actor
- Bhumi Tripathi – Politician and Member of the House of Representatives
- Bimala Tamang – Karateka and Asian Games bronze medalist
- Biraj Maharjan – Former captain of the Nepal national football team
- Dol Prasad Aryal – Politician and former Minister for Labour, Employment and Social Security
- Naba Raj Lamsal – Poet, radio journalist, and Madan Puraskar winner
- Phanindra Prasad Lohani – First Nepalese M.Sc. (Physics) degree holder, academician, and Founding Principal of the Amrit Campus
- Prem Pariyar – Playback singer and child artist
- Prithvi Narayan Shah – Unifier of modern Nepal and former ruler of the region
- Rabindra Pratap Shah – Former Chief of Nepal Police (IGP) and politician
- Rajendra Prasad Pandey – Politician and former Chief Minister of Bagmati Province
- Ram Nath Adhikari – Politician and Former Minister of Agriculture and Livestock Development
- Rishi Dhamala – Media personality and journalist
- Rudra Pandey – Entrepreneur and software engineer
- Santoshi Shrestha – Long-distance runner and South Asian Games gold medalist
- Surendra Pandey – Politician and former Finance Minister of Nepal
- Sushma Shimkhada – Sculptor and recipient of the Mahakavi Devakota Award
- Yuddha Prasad Neupane – Progressive farmer and winner of the Krishi Tara Award; his model farm was visited by the Israeli Ambassador in 2025

== See also ==
- Charaundi (Commercial zone)
- Zones of Nepal
