= National Highway 25 (Nepal) =

Highway in Nepal

Bhanubhakta Acharya Highway भानुभक्त आचार्य राजमार्ग
- राष्ट्रिय राजमार्ग २५
- National Highway 25
- NH25 in red

Route information
- Maintained by MoPIT (Department of Roads)
- Length: 108.41 km (67.36 mi)

Major junctions
- North end: Chame
- South end: Dumre

Location
- Country: Nepal
- Provinces: Gandaki Province
- Districts: Tanahu District, Lamjung District, Manang District

Highway system
- Roads in Nepal
← NH24	→ NH26

National Highway 25 (Dumre-Besishahar-Chame) or Bhanubhakta Acharya Highway is National Highway of Nepal, located in Gandaki Province. The total length of the highway is 108.41 kilometres (67.36 mi). The highway passes through three districts of Gandaki Province: Tanahu District, Lamjung District and Manang District.

== Details ==
NH25 (details)
	Point	Municipality / rural municipality	District
Starts	NH17	Bandipur Rural Municipality	Tanahu
Passes through	Bais Jagir	Bhanu Municipality	Tanahu
Passes through		Sundarbazar Municipality	Lamjung
Passes through	Besishahar	Besishahar Municipality	Lamjung
Passes through	Ghermu, Jital	Marsyangdi Rural Municipality	Lamjung
Passes through	Tal, Odar	Nason Rural Municipality	Manang
Ends	Chame	Chame Rural Municipality	Manang
