= Thulagi glacier =

Glacier in Nepal

Thulagi
- Location within Nepal Location within Tibet
- Interactive map of Thulagi
- Type: Valley glacier
- Location: Nepal
- Coordinates: 28°31′15″N 84°32′25″E

Thulagi glacier is located in the catchment area of the Marshyangdi River basin in Nepal. A study by KfW, Frankfurt and the BGR (Federal Institute for Geosciences and Natural Resources, Germany), in cooperation with the Department of Hydrology and Meteorology of Nepal have identified it as a potentially dangerous glacier due to possibility of outburst of the lake created by the glacier.

Thulagi glacier feeds the Thulagi and Dona lakes. Thulagi Lake is located southwest of Mt. Manaslu at an altitude of 4,044m. The volume of Thulagi lake is about 35.3 million cu.m as of 2009 an increase from 31.75 million cu.m in 1995. From 1991 to 2016, the glacier has retreated at a rate of 30 m/year.

== Risks ==
- An outburst of flooding from the lake could cause a loss of US$406.73 million. The estimated maximum flood flow is 1400 to 5400 m^{3}/second. About 165,068 people are estimated to be directly affected by flooding.
- The hydropower projects in the Marsyangdi such as Marsyangdi Hydropower Station (69MW) and the Middle Marsyangdi Hydropower Station (70MW) are in immediate threat to flooding.

== See also ==
- Imja Glacier
- List of glaciers in Asia
- Glacial lake outburst flood
