= Paungda Danda =

Mountain

- Swarga Dwar
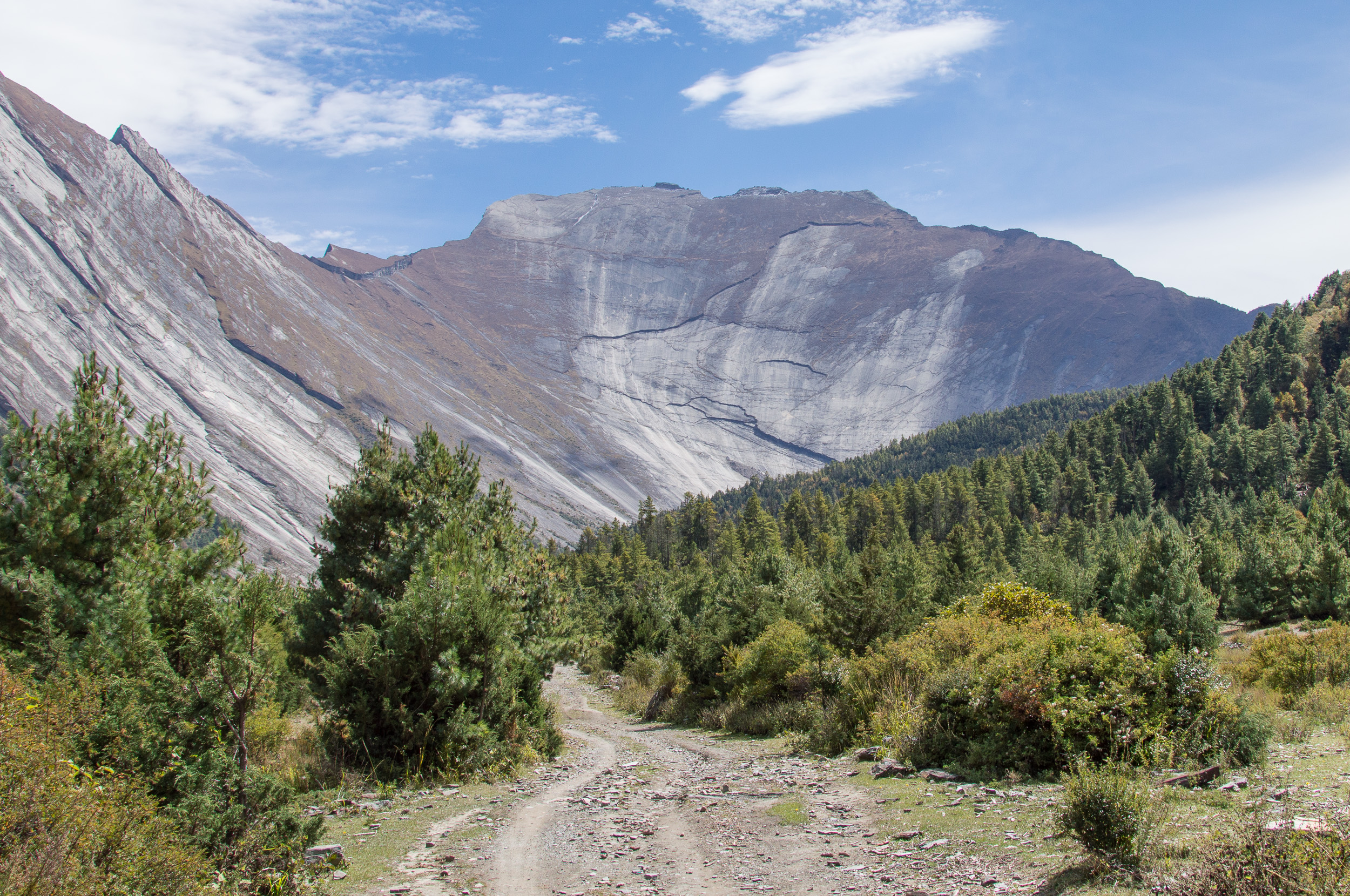
- Paunda Danda's western rock face

Highest point
- Elevation: 4,755 m (15,600 ft)
- Parent peak: Pisang Peak
- Coordinates: 28°35′10″N 84°13′06″E

Geography
- Location within Nepal
- Location: Gandaki Zone, Nepal

Paungda Danda is a Himalayan mountain located in Manang District, Western Region, Nepal. The mountain is not significantly prominent, and is a subsidiary peak to the southeast of Pisang Peak. Paungda Danda is notable for its western rock face that rises dramatically 1,700 m (5,600 ft) above the Marshyangdi River. The mountain's smooth western face, also known as the Great Wall of Pisang, is composed of slate rock and formed as a result of an ancient lakebed being uplifted during the creation of the Himalayas. Today, the mountain is a recognizable feature along the Annapurna Circuit, a popular trekking route.

The Paungda Danda is locally referred to as Swarga Dwar. Swarga meaning Heaven, Dwar meaning Gate. The local people believe that the spirits of the deceased must ascend the wall after leaving their bodies to reach the heavens. There is an absolute taboo on climbing to the top of this cliff.
