= Tanki =

Tanki may refer to:

- Tanki Online, an MMO game launched by AlternativaPlatform
- Tanki X, a discontinued browser game by AlternativaPlatform
- Tanki Manang, a village development committee in Nepal

== See also ==
- Tanky (disambiguation)
