= Kang La Pass =

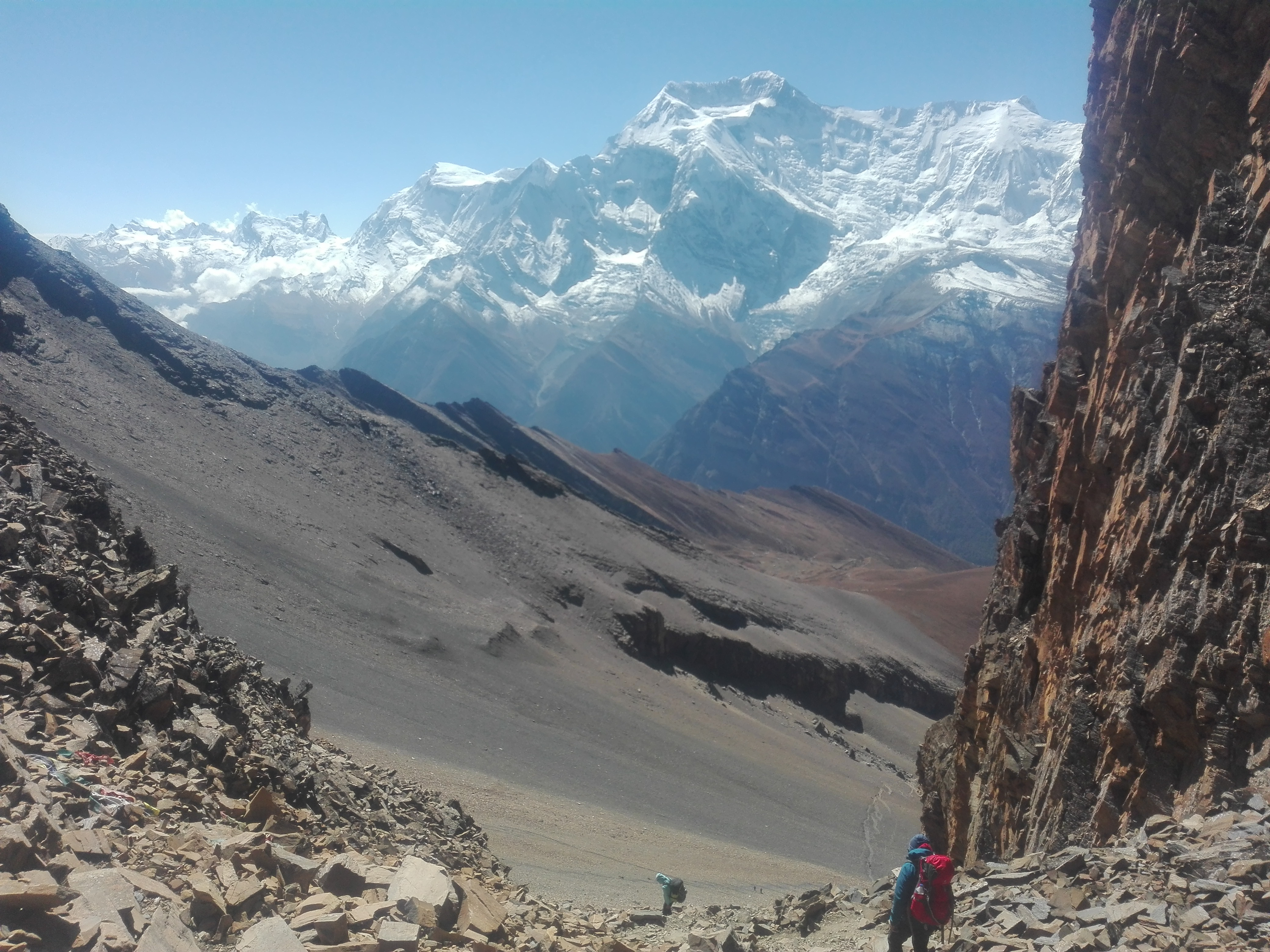
- Kang La Pass. The route to Manang is to the north, and view of Annapurna Range from Kang la pass
- Elevation: 5,306 metres (17,408 ft)

Third Approach
- Location: Nepal
- Range: Himalayas

Kang La Pass or Kang La is a mountain pass in the Manang District of Gandaki Province of Nepal. The path starts in Nar village.

The Kang La Pass, standing at an elevation of 5,320 meters (17,454 ft), serves as the high-altitude bridge between the hidden Nar Phu Valley and the traditional Annapurna Circuit. The pass is the defining highlight of the region, offering a dramatic transition from the stark, wind-sculpted canyons of the "Lost Valley" to the lush, expansive vistas of the Manang Valley.
