= Nar Phu =

Valley in Tibet

Nar Phu Valley is located in Nepal, south of Tibet border and north of main Annapurna Circuit. The valley starts at an elevation of 3000 meters and ranges up to 7,140 meters. Most of the valley consists of barren and rugged topography, similar to Upper Mustang region of Nepal. It is home to many popular mountains including Kang Guru, Pisang Peak, Himlung, Nemjung and Gyaji Kyang. The most notable geographical feature of the valley is its brown rocky towering hills above 5000 meters, including Chhomchomo hill and Yongmoso hill.

== History ==
There are no official records of when the first inhabitants arrived in this valley. The villagers claim that they arrived here at least one thousand years ago from Tibet. The government reports state that they arrived here in the 17th century or the 18th century after fleeing Tibet.

The villagers describe their ancestors as ruthless and brave warriors. Before their ancestors turned into Buddhist, they followed Bon religion. Previously, there were traditions of human sacrifice among the inhabitants of valley. Later as the village population began shrinking, they stopped this tradition and instead sacrificed calves. When the villagers found out the calf's mother was searching for her calf, they decided to stop this tradition.

Nar and Phu villages were/are the two most prominent villages of the valley. As the valley is surrounded by mountains and rocky hills from all sides, it was inaccessible for most of the travelers. This is one of the reasons it has remained remote and less explored compared to other neighboring villages: Ngawal, Chame, Koto, Bhakra etc.

== Villages ==
=== Nar Village ===
Nar village lies at an elevation of 4,150 meters. This village still retains the traditional architecture of Himalayan houses. These are made of stones and muds, with prayers flags fluttering among each house. It houses three monasteries of the Nyingmapa sect, all of which are located in the field close to the village.

=== Phu Village ===
Phu village lies at an altitude of 4,050 meters. It occupies fortress-like a high hill whose vertical east side drops in the Phu river. Yul Gompa is situated at the top of this hill, looking after the whole village.

=== Meta Village ===
Meta was previously used as a winter settlement and farming land for Nar villagers. Later as trekkers began arriving in this valley, some villagers from Nar moved to Meta to take benefit of the economic opportunity.

=== Chyakhu Village ===
Chyakhu village was another seasonal winter settlement for Nar villagers. Even now there are only about 4 houses in the village. It houses the head office of Narpa Bhumi Rural Municipality.

=== Kyang Village ===
Kyang village was used as a farming land by Phu villagers because of its arable land. Now a few lodges have been established there to serve the trekkers.

== Tashi Lhakhang Monastery ==
Tashi Lhakhang Monastery is one of the revered monasteries which lies on the northern hill of Phu village. It is believed to be the last monastery built by great Buddhist master, Lama Karma Sonam Rinpoche in the 13th century. Today, a new monastery has been built above the old monastery.
