= Upper Marsyangdi A Hydroelectric Station =

- Location within Nepal
- Official name: Upper Marsyangdi A Hydroelectric Station
- Country: Nepal
- Coordinates: 28.283°N 84.36063°E
- Purpose: Power
- Status: Operational
- Construction began: 8 Jan 2013
- Owners: Joint venture of Power China Resources Ltd and Sino-Sagarmatha Power Company

Dam and spillways
- Type of dam: Gravity
- Impounds: Marshyangdi River

Upper Marsyangdi A Hydroelectric Station
- Coordinates: 28.283°N 84.36063°E
- Commission date: 2076-06-20 BS
- Type: Run-of-the-river
- Turbines: 2 x 25 MW Francis-type
- Installed capacity: 50 MW

Upper marsyangdi A Hydroelectric Station is a run-of-river hydro-electric plant located in Bhulbhule of Lamjung district of western Nepal. The flow from Marshyangdi River is used to generate 50 MW electricity. The energy is evacuated by a 25 km long, 132 kv single circuit transmission line from Bhulbhule (powerhouse) to Middle Marsyangdi Hydropower Project.

The project construction started in October 2012 and was expected to be completed in December 2015, but it was delayed due to the earthquake and the Indian blockade in 2015. First turbine was installed on 25 September 2016. The second turbine was added on 23 December 2016. It is the first project to use a vortex type settling basin.

== Funding ==
It is the first project in Nepal built with foreign direct investment from China. The project was developed by Joint venture of Power China Resources Ltd and Sino-Sagarmatha Power Company Nepal. Sino-Sagarmatha owns 10% share. Power China Resources Ltd, which holds 90% share, used 75% loan and 25% equity for the project. The project's payback period is 10 years. Nepal Electricity Authority buys the energy at 0.05999 USDollars per unit from this project.

== Environment concerns ==
- Since the Marshyangi river is popular for rafting, the construction of the dam has dried up the downstream stretch that has disrupted the rafting and fishing in this area.

== See also ==
- Marsyangdi Hydropower Station (another 69 MW station in the same river)
- Middle Marsyangdi Hydropower Station (70 MW)
