= Bagarchhap =

Bagarchhap बगरछाप
- Village development committee
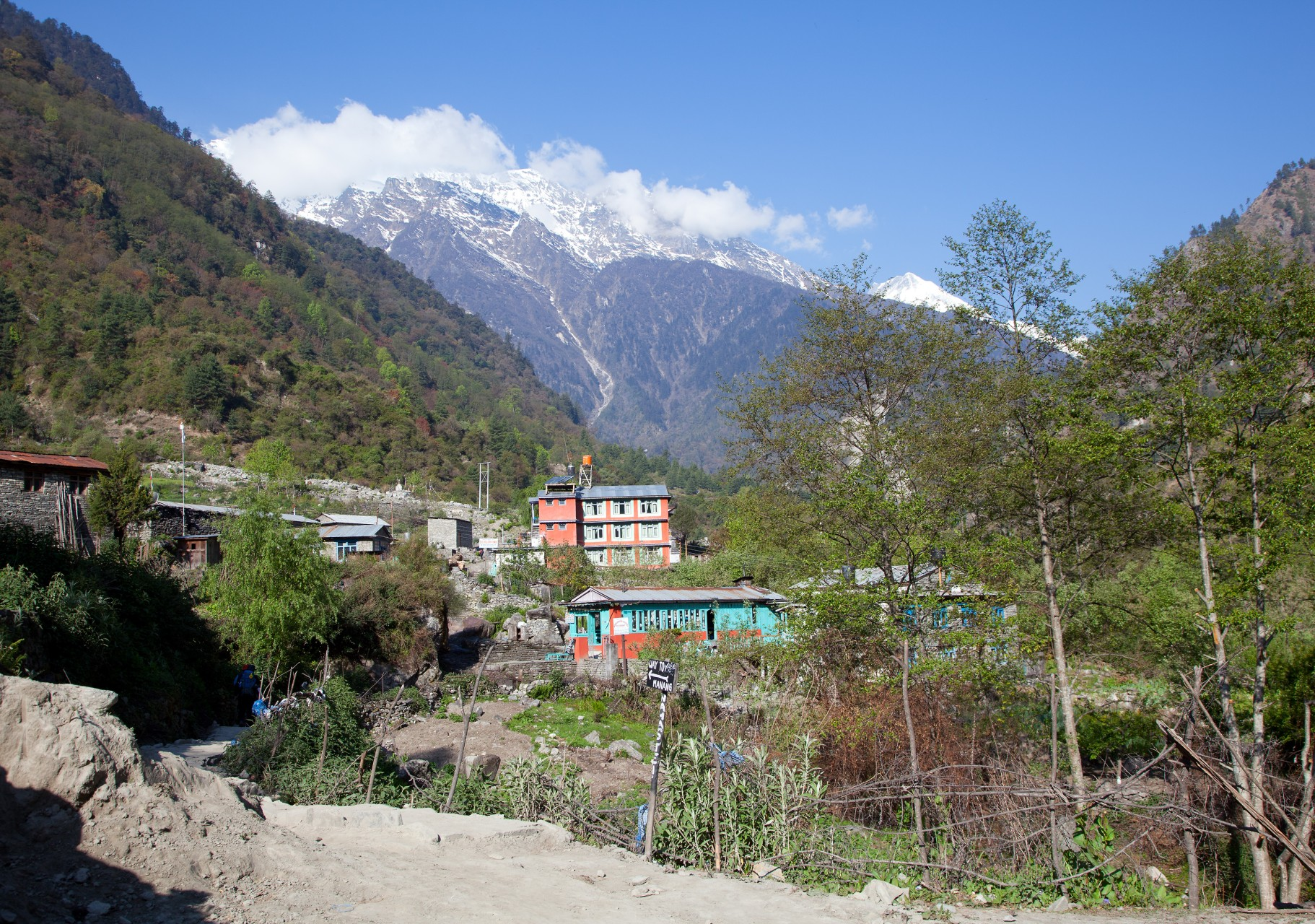
- Bagarchhap

- Location in Nepal Bagarchhap (Nepal)
- Coordinates: 28°32′N 84°20.3′E
- Country: Nepal
- Zone: Gandaki Zone
- District: Manang District

Population (1991)
  - Total: 534
- Time zone: UTC+5:45 (Nepal Time)

Bagarchhap is a village development committee in Manang District in the Gandaki Zone of northern Nepal. At the time of the 1991 Nepal census it had a population of 534 people living in 116 individual households.

On 10 November 1995 most of Bagarchap (around 80%) was destroyed by a landslide, which killed 11 villagers and 9 trekkers. Many villagers relocated to Danaque to the west and Bagarchhap is now much smaller than it was prior to the landslide.
