= Daraudi A Hydropower Plant =

Daraundi A Hydropower Station
- Location within Nepal
- Official name: Daraundi A Hydropower Project
- Country: Nepal
- Location: Gorkha District
- Coordinates: 28.134106°N 84.686519°E
- Purpose: Power
- Status: Operational
- Owner: Daraundi Kalika Hydro

Dam and spillways
- Type of dam: Gravity
- Impounds: Daraundi River

Power Station
- Commission date: 2073-08-12 BS
- Type: Run-of-the-river
- Installed capacity: 6 MW

Daraundi A Hydropower Station (or Daraudi A; Nepali: दरौदी A जलविद्युत आयोजना) is a 6 MW run-of-river hydro-electric plant located on the Daraundi River in the Gorkha District of Nepal.

== Location and water source ==
The project is located in the former Muchok, Takumajh Lakuribot and Saurpani VDCs of Gorkha District. The flow from Daraundi River is used to generate 6 MW electricity. It has a catchment area upstream from the intake of 224 square kilometres (86 sq mi), and long-term annual average flow at this point of 17.7 cubic metres per second (630 cu ft/s). Lower down the Daraundi Khola joins the Marshyangdi river at Abun Khaireni about 3 kilometres (1.9 mi) upstream from the tailrace of the Marshyangdi dam.

== Construction ==
Nil Tara Pvt. Ltd. conducted the feasibility study for the Daraudi-A Hydroelectric project. Orient Consult Pvt. Ltd. reviewed and revised the study, including changing the headrace canal to a tunnel and revisions to the layout. The revised design would give installed capacity of 6.5 MW and would deliver 35.51 GWh per year.

Kalika Construction began work in July 2013. In December 2013 the project director reported that work had begun on the intake structure, sedimentation site and office camp, and expected completion within one and a half years. About 200 people were employed on the project. The target for completion was July 2015, but delays were caused by earthquakes and blockages. On 8 September 2016 the project began trial electricity generation. The plant started delivering electricity from 2073-08-12 BS (28 October 2016). It was inaugurated by Pushpa Kamal Dahal (Prachanda), former prime minister of Nepal.

== Technical ==
The project has two trapezoidal coffer dams, with lengths of 185 metres (607 ft) and 130 metres (430 ft) and a height of 2.5 metres (8 ft 2 in) above the bed of the river. A concrete under-sluice dam has one bay with a vertical lift gate, a 6 metres (20 ft) long weir with a maximum height from foundation to crest of 3.3 metres (11 ft). A 60 metres (200 ft) long concrete weir has a maximum height from foundation to crest of 7.3 metres (24 ft). The desander has four intake bays with vertical lift gates and is 75 metres (246 ft) long, 8 metres (26 ft) wide and 4.5 metres (15 ft) deep. It was designed to discharge 12.45 cubic metres per second (440 cu ft/s).

From the desander there is a 3,578 metres (11,739 ft) reinforced concrete canal with a slope of 1:1000 and cross section of 2.5 by 25 metres (8 ft 2 in by 82 ft 0 in). There is a 201 metres (659 ft) canal siphon at Sota/Jhyalla Khola and a 173 metres (568 ft) pipe siphon at Chainage. The forebay has a surface area of 830 cubic metres (29,000 cu ft) and capacity of 2,490 metres (8,170 ft), with an 80 metres (260 ft) spillway to Syangdi Khola.

The powerhouse is in Chanaute. A 300 metres (980 ft) penstock pipe with diameter 2.1 metres (6 ft 11 in) leads from the forebay to the powerhouse. The gross head from the forebay is 66 metres (217 ft). The power station holds two horizontal axis Francis turbines with rated capacity 5.66 cubic metres (200 cu ft) connected to two generators with capacity 3.2 MW. From the switch yard the power is transmitted over a 14 kilometres (8.7 mi) 33kV single circuit line to the Gorkha substation.

== Impact ==
It was assumed that the Daraundu hydropower project and dam would obstruct migration of fish and severely reduce their population. The project required acquisition of about 6 hectares (15 acres) of land, and including improving 27 kilometres (17 mi) of road and building a 0.5 kilometres (0.31 mi) road to the dam site. Three households were relocated. The project reduced water available for irrigation at some sites, causing much resentment by farmers. The farmers at Daraundi A expected road improvements and an electricity supply from the project, but received neither. The project developers stated that these things were the responsibility of the government.

== Ownership and finance ==
The plant is developed and partially owned by Daraundi Kalika Hydro, an Independent Power Producer. As of 2018 the company was listed in a World Bank report as being one of the hydropower companies operating after 2010 that had not issued local shares. The main investor is Global IME Bank.

The project cost Rs 1.30 billion. Pricing would be Rs8.4 per kilowatt hour in the dry season, and Rs4.8 per kilowatt hour in the wet season. A ten-year payback was expected. The generation licence will expire in 2104-02-15 BS, after which the plant will be handed over to the government. The power station is connected to the national grid and the electricity is sold to Nepal Electricity Authority.

== See also ==
- List of power stations in Nepal

== Sources ==
- Arica Crootof (2019), Nepal's Hydropower Boom and its Implications for Water Resources: Challenges and Opportunities at the Intersection of Food and Energy Production in the Gandaki River Basin (Thesis), University of Arizona, Bibcode:2019PhDT.......108C
- Asian Development Bank (1 December 2018), Impact of Dam on Fish in the Rivers of Nepal, Asian Development Bank, ISBN 978-92-9261-433-1
- Daraudi-'A' Hydroelectric Project (6MW), Kalika Group, archived from the original on 2020-10-31
- "Daraundi A hydropower project takes speed", Nepal Energy Forum, 14 December 2013
- "Inauguration of Daraudi Hydropower Project, generating electricity from tomorrow (दरौदी जलविद्युत आयोजनाको उद्घाटन, भोलिबाट विजुली उत्पादन गर्ने)", Online Khabar (in Nepali)
- Local Shares: An In-depth Examination of the Opportunities and Risks for Local Communities Seeking to Invest in Nepal's Hydropower Projects, International Finance Corporation, 2018
- "Trial Production of Daraundi A Hydropower Project Started (दरौँदी ए जलविद्युत आयोजनाको परीक्षण उत्पादन सुरु)", Nepali Headlines, 2016-10-17
