= Phu, Nepal =

Phu, Nepal फू
- Village development committee
- Location in Nepal Phu, Nepal (Nepal)
- Coordinates: 28.80°N 84.32°E
- Country: Nepal
- Zone: Gandaki Zone
- District: Manang District

Population (2011)
  - Total: 176
- Time zone: UTC+5:45 (Nepal Time)

Phu, Nepal is a village located in Narpa Bhumi Rural Municipality in Manang District in the Gandaki Zone of northern Nepal. It is a prominent village of Nar Phu Valley, along with Nar Village. At the time of the 2011 Nepal census it had a population of 176 people living in 36 individual households.
