= Narpa Bhumi Rural Municipality =

Narpa Bhumi Rural Municipality नार्पा भुमी गाउँपालिका
- Gaunpalika
- Location in Nepal
- Coordinates: 28.699028°N 84.255998°E
- Country: Nepal
- Province: Gandaki
- District: Manang District

Government
  - Chairman: Konjo Tshering Lama (NC)

Area
  - Total: 837.5 km^{2} (323.4 sq mi)

Population
  - Total: 538
  - Density: 0.642/km^{2} (1.66/sq mi)
- Time zone: UTC+5:45 (Nepal Time)
- Website: http://narpabhumimun.gov.np/

Narpa Bhumi Rural Municipality (Narpa Bhumi Gaupalika) (Nepali: नार्पा भुमी गाउँपालिका) is a Gaunpalika in Manang District in Gandaki Province of Nepal. It administers the villages in Nar Phu Valley, such as Nar, Phu, Kyang, Chyakhu and Meta.On 12 March 2017, the government of Nepal implemented a new local administrative structure, in which VDCs have been replaced with municipal and Village Councils. Narpa Bhumi is one of these 753 local units. Its population is 538.
