= Dharapani, Gandaki =

Dharapani धारापानी
- Village development committee
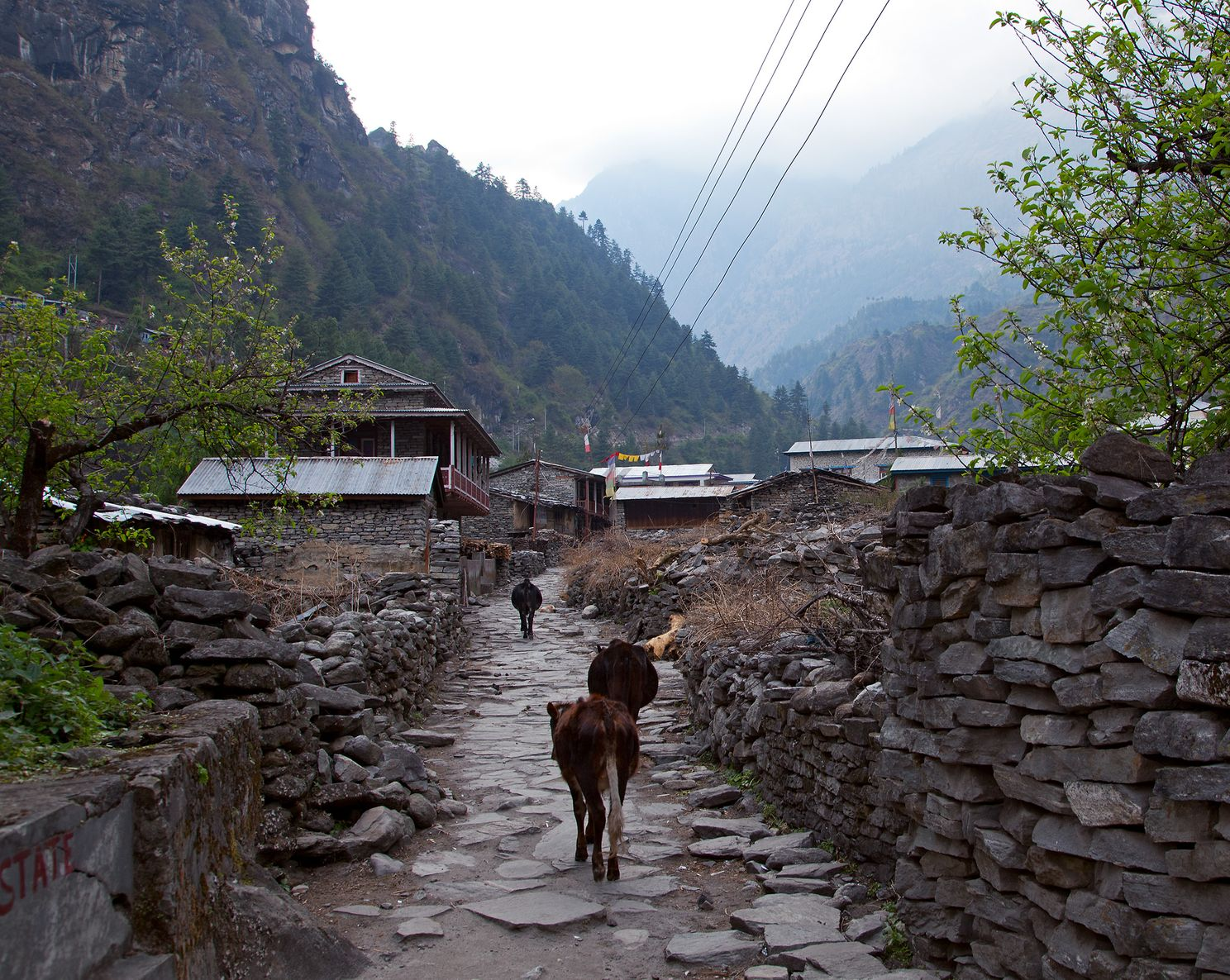
- Dharapani village

- Location in Nepal Dharapani (Nepal)
- Coordinates: 28.5177876°N 84.3584478°E
- Country: Nepal
- Zone: Gandaki
- District: Manang
- Elevation: 1,860 m (6,100 ft)

Population (2011)
  - Total: 1,012
- Time zone: UTC+5:45 (Nepal Time)

Dharapani is a village development committee in Manang District in the Gandaki Zone of northern Nepal. The village development Community has 21 administrative ward, ranging from 2,300 meters to 3,900 meters above sea level. At the time of the 2001 Nepal census it had a population of 1012 people living in 232 individual households.
