= Khangsar =

Khangsar खाङसार
- Village development committee
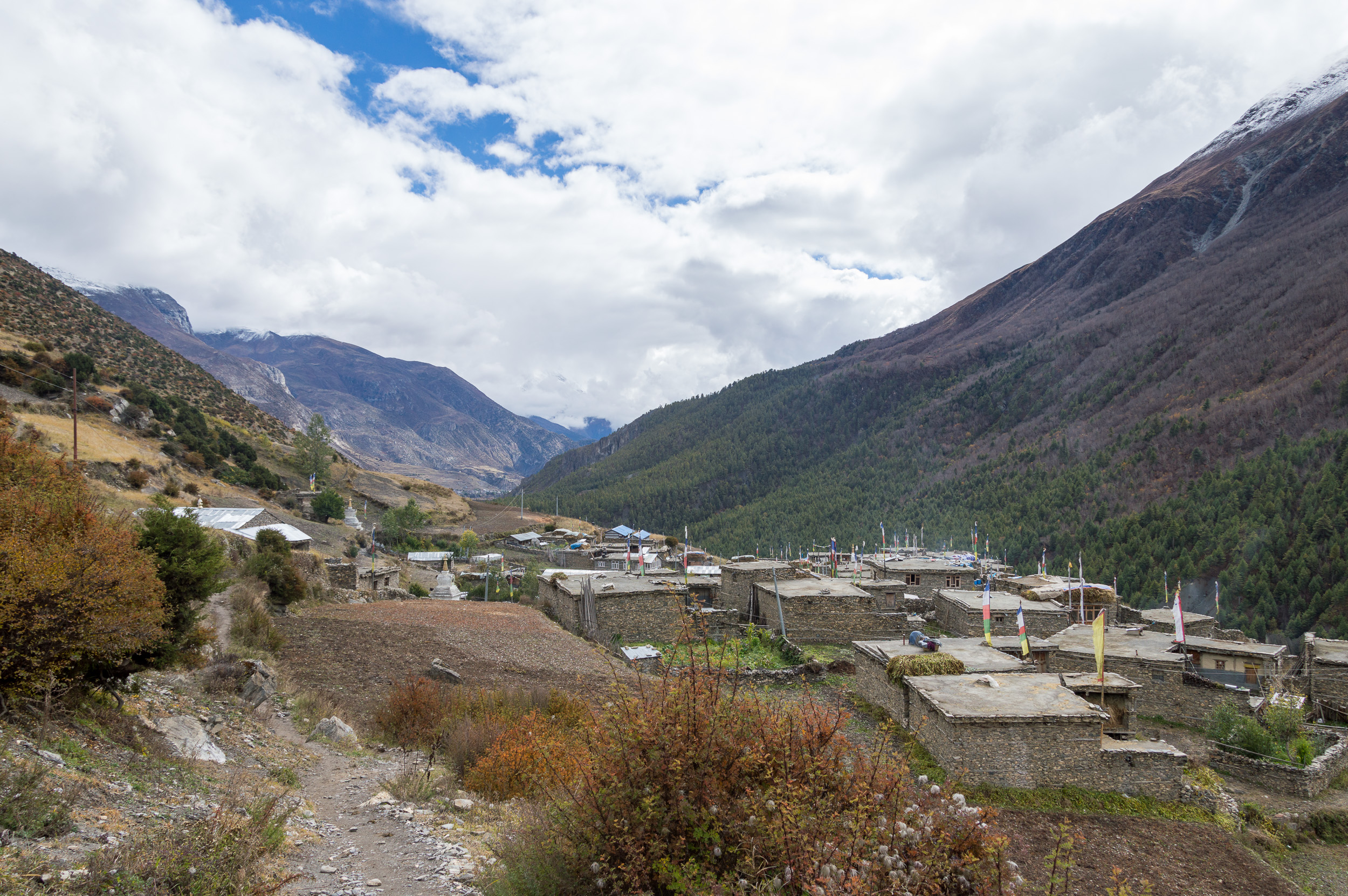
- Khangsar

- Location in Nepal Khangsar (Nepal)
- Coordinates: 28.669722°N 83.973333°E
- Country: Nepal
- Zone: Gandaki Zone
- District: Manang District

Population (2011)
  - Total: 257
- Time zone: UTC+5:45 (Nepal Time)
- Area code: +977-66
- Website: http://www.ddcmanang.gov.np

Khangsar is a village development committee in Manang District in the Gandaki Zone of northern Nepal. At the time of the 2011 Nepal census it had a population of 257 people in 58 individual households.

Khangsar village is located in north central Nepal 3756 meters above sea level. There are more than 300 inhabitants.
