= Tachi Bagarchhap =

Tachi Bagarchhap ताची बगरछाप
- Village development committee
- Location in Nepal Tachi Bagarchhap (Nepal)
- Coordinates: 28.59°N 84.30°E
- Country: Nepal
- Zone: Gandaki Zone
- District: Manang District

Population (2011)
  - Total: 544
- Time zone: UTC+5:45 (Nepal Time)

Tachi Bagarchhap is a village development committee in Manang District in the Gandaki Zone of northern Nepal. At the time of the 2011 Nepal census it had a population of 544.
