= Thoche =

Thoche थोचे
- Village development committee
- Starting Point To The Manaslu Along Dudh Khola

- Location in Nepal Thoche (Nepal)
- Coordinates: 28.64°N 84.44°E
- Country: Nepal
- Zone: Gandaki Zone
- District: Manang District

Population (2011)
  - Total: 382
- Time zone: UTC+5:45 (Nepal Time)

Thoche is a village development committee in Manang District in the Gandaki Zone of northern Nepal. At the time of the 2011 Nepal census it had a population of 382 people living in 102 individual households.
