= Rural municipality (Nepal) =

Nepalese administrative subdivisions

A gaunpalika (Nepali: गाउँपालिका, romanized: Gāum̐pālikā, lit. 'rural municipality' Nepali pronunciation: [ɡãũ̯palika]) is an administrative division in Nepal. The Ministry of Federal Affairs and Local Development dissolved the existing village development committees and announced the establishment of this new local body. It is a sub-unit of a district. There are currently 481 rural municipalities.

== History ==
The village development committee was the previous governing body of villages in Nepal. They were replaced on 10 May 2017 by the rural municipalities which were formed by combining different VDCs. The decision was taken by the cabinet of Nepal after modifications in the report proposed by the Local Level Restructuring Commission. Initially 481 rural municipalities were formed but it was later changed to 481 municipalities. According to the Ministry of Federal Affairs and Local Development the new bodies were to be called "rural municipality" and not "village council" which was the literal translation of the word "gaunpalika".

== Structure and responsibilities ==
As defined by Part 17 of the Constitution of Nepal, the rural municipalities are governed by a village executive headed by a chairperson. The village executive consists of the deputy chairperson, ward chairpersons elected from each ward in the rural municipality, and four women members elected from among members of the Village Assembly and two members from the Dalit or other minority communities. Part 18 of the Constitution of Nepal states that the Village Assembly hold all legislative powers of the rural municipality. It consists of the chairperson, deputy chairperson, ward chairpersons and four ward members elected from each of the wards in the rural municipality out of which at least two must be women The members of the Dalit or minority community nominated to the Village Executive is also a member of the Village Assembly. Part 17 also includes provisions for a Judicial Committee which is headed by the deputy chairperson and consists of two other members elected by the Village Assembly among themselves. Schedule 8 and Schedule 9 of the constitution deals with powers that the local executive can execute either on its own or concurrently with the federal and the provincial governments.

Some of the authorities that the rural municipalities have include collecting various taxes like the entertainment tax, business tax and residential tax at the local level. The rural municipalities have an annual budget of at least Rs 10 million. The rural municipalities are also members of the National Association of Rural Municipalities (NARMIN), an umbrella organisation of the 460 rural municipalities in Nepal.

== List of gaunpalikas ==
Largest Gaunpalikas (2017)
Gaunpalika	District	Province	Population
Raptisonari	Banke	Lumbini	59,946
Baijanath	Banke	Lumbini	54,418
Khajura	Banke	Lumbini	50,961
Janaki	Kailali	Sudurpashchim	48,540
Mayadevi	Kapilvastu	Lumbini	48,218
Kailari	Kailali	Sudurpashchim	47,987
Badhaiyatal	Bardiya	Lumbini	47,868
Gaidhawa	Rupandehi	Lumbini	47,565
Mayadevi	Rupandehi	Lumbini	47,196
Suddodhan	Kapilvastu	Lumbini	45,201

Smallest Gaunpalikas (2017)
Gaunpalika	District	Province	Population
Narpa Bhumi	Manang	Gandaki	538
Chame	Manang	Gandaki	1,129
Lo-Ghekar Damodarkunda	Mustang	Gandaki	1,423
Chharka Tangsong	Dolpa	Karnali	1,451
Lomanthang	Mustang	Gandaki	1,899
Nason	Manang	Gandaki	1,899
Dolpo Buddha	Dolpa	Karnali	2,126
Saipal	Bajhang	Sudurpashchim	2,182
Manang Disyang	Manang	Gandaki	2,222
Jagadulla	Dolpa	Karnali	2,273

== See also ==
- Municipalities of Nepal
- Village development committee (Nepal)
- Local government in Nepal
