= Pisang =

Pisang पिसाङ
- Village development committee
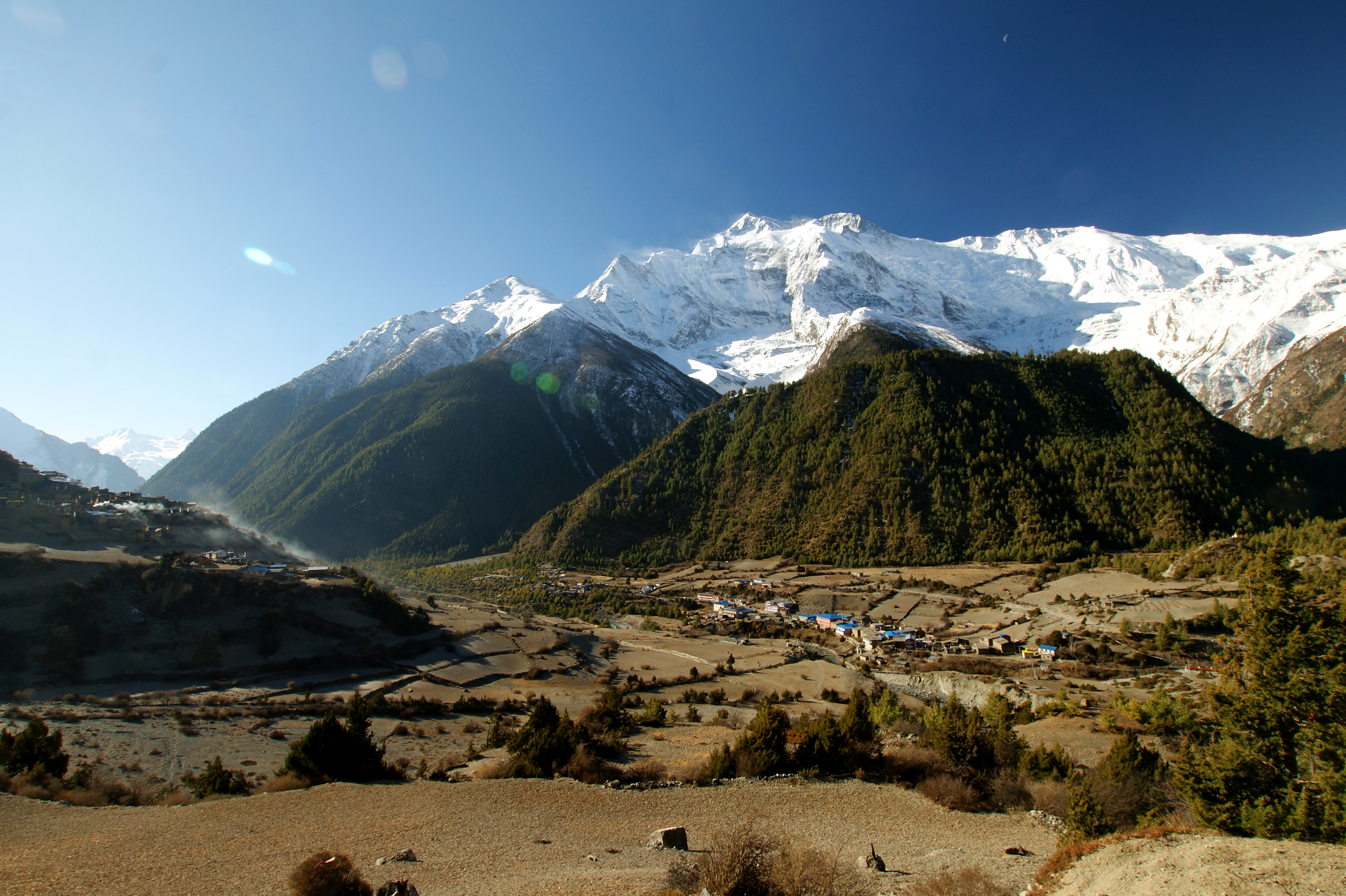
- Pisang

- Location in Nepal Pisang (Nepal)
- Coordinates: 28.61673°N 84.14991°E
- Country: Nepal
- Zone: Gandaki
- District: Manang
- Elevation: 3,250 m (10,660 ft)

Population (2011)
  - Total: 307
- Time zone: UTC+5:45 (Nepal Time)

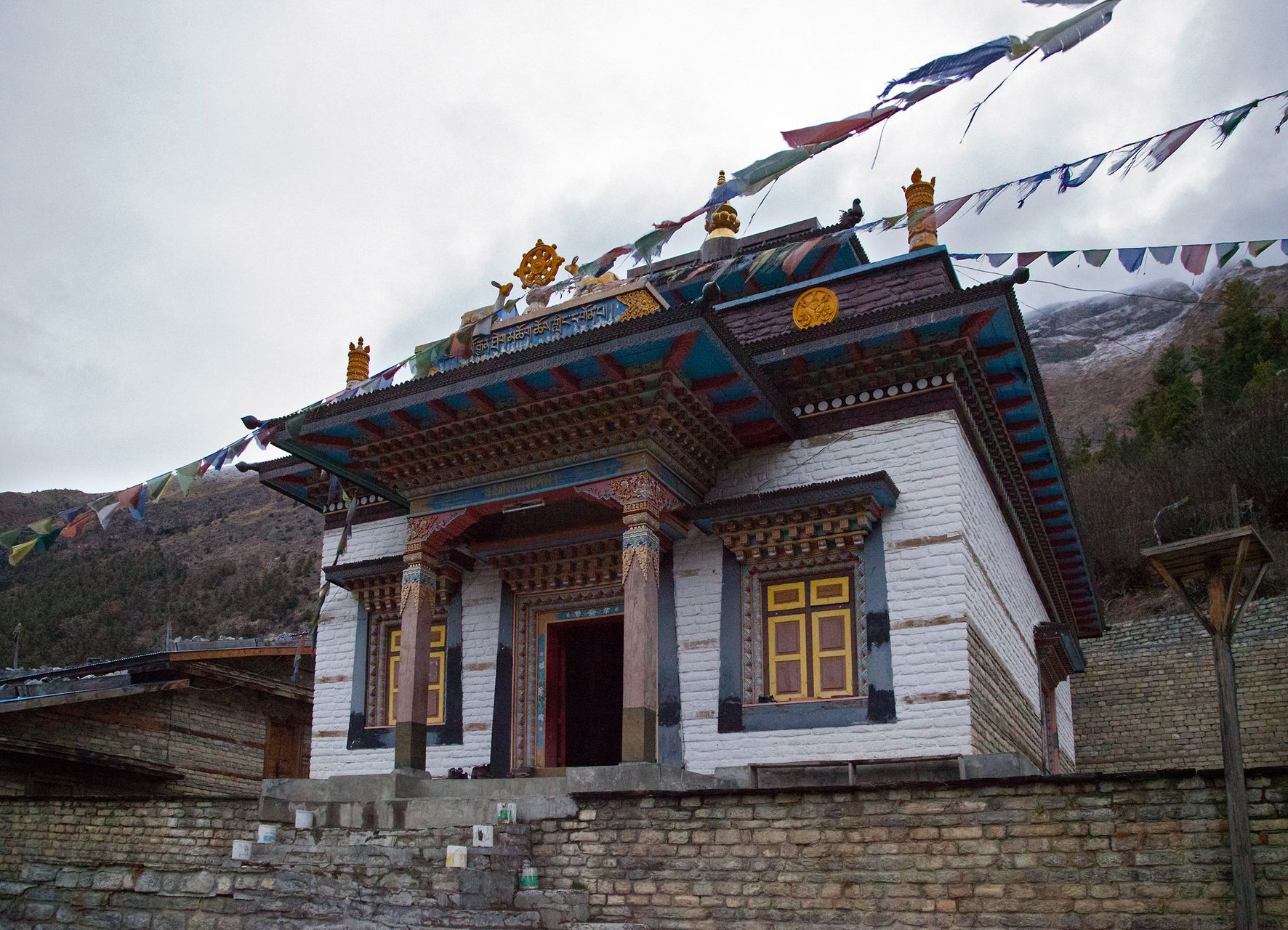
Buddhist temple in Pisang

Pisang is a village development committee in Manang District in the Gandaki Zone of northern Nepal. At the time of the 2011 Nepal census it had a population of 307 people living in 105 individual households. The village is located in the Marshyangdi River valley, directly south of Pisang Peak, north of Annapurna II, and west of Paungda Danda.
