= Daraudi River =

- Location within Nepal
- Native name: Daraundi Khola (Nepali)

Physical characteristics
- Mouth: Marshyangdi river
  - location: Abun Khaireni
  - coordinates: 27.90555°N 84.54641°E

The Daraudi River (or Daraundi Khola) is a river in Nepal. It is a left tributary of the Marshyangdi river, which in turn joins the Trishuli River.

== Hydroelectricity ==
The flow from the Daraudi River is used to generate 6 MW electricity at the Daraudi A Hydropower Plant located in the former Muchok, Takumajh Lakuribot and Saurpani VDCs of Gorkha District. The plant has a catchment area upstream from the intake of 224 square kilometres (86 sq mi), and long-term annual average flow at this point of 17.7 cubic metres per second (630 cu ft/s). It was assumed that the Daraundu hydropower project and dam would obstruct migration of fish up the river and severely reduce their population.

== Lower section ==
Rainfall station No. 441 is at Naya Sanghu in the Daraundi basin, with a catchment area of 376 metres (1,234 ft). The runoff-rainfall ratio is 1.03. The Daraundi Khola joins the Marshyangdi river at Abun Khaireni about 3 kilometres (1.9 mi) upstream from the tailrace of the Marshyangdi dam.

== Sources ==
- Asian Development Bank (1 December 2018), Impact of Dam on Fish in the Rivers of Nepal, Asian Development Bank, ISBN 978-92-9261-433-1
- Bhusal, Jagat K.; Bajracharya, Om Ratna; Bagale, Lekh Nath (1–4 September 2008), Assessment of Water Availability in Major River Basins of Western Nepal (PDF), Montpellier, France: XIIIth World Water Congress
- Daraudi-'A' Hydroelectric Project (6MW), Kalika Group, archived from the original on 31 October 2020
