= Tanky =

Tanky may refer to:

- "Tanky" Challenor (1922–2008), British police officer and former soldier prosecuted for corruption
- A storage tank, especially a water tank ("water tanky"), in the Indian subcontinent variety of English
- Tankie, a pejorative label for authoritarian communists

== See also ==
- Ranky Tanky, an American musical ensemble based in Charleston, South Carolina
- Tanki (disambiguation)
