= Ghyaru =

Ghyaru घ्यारु
- Village development committee
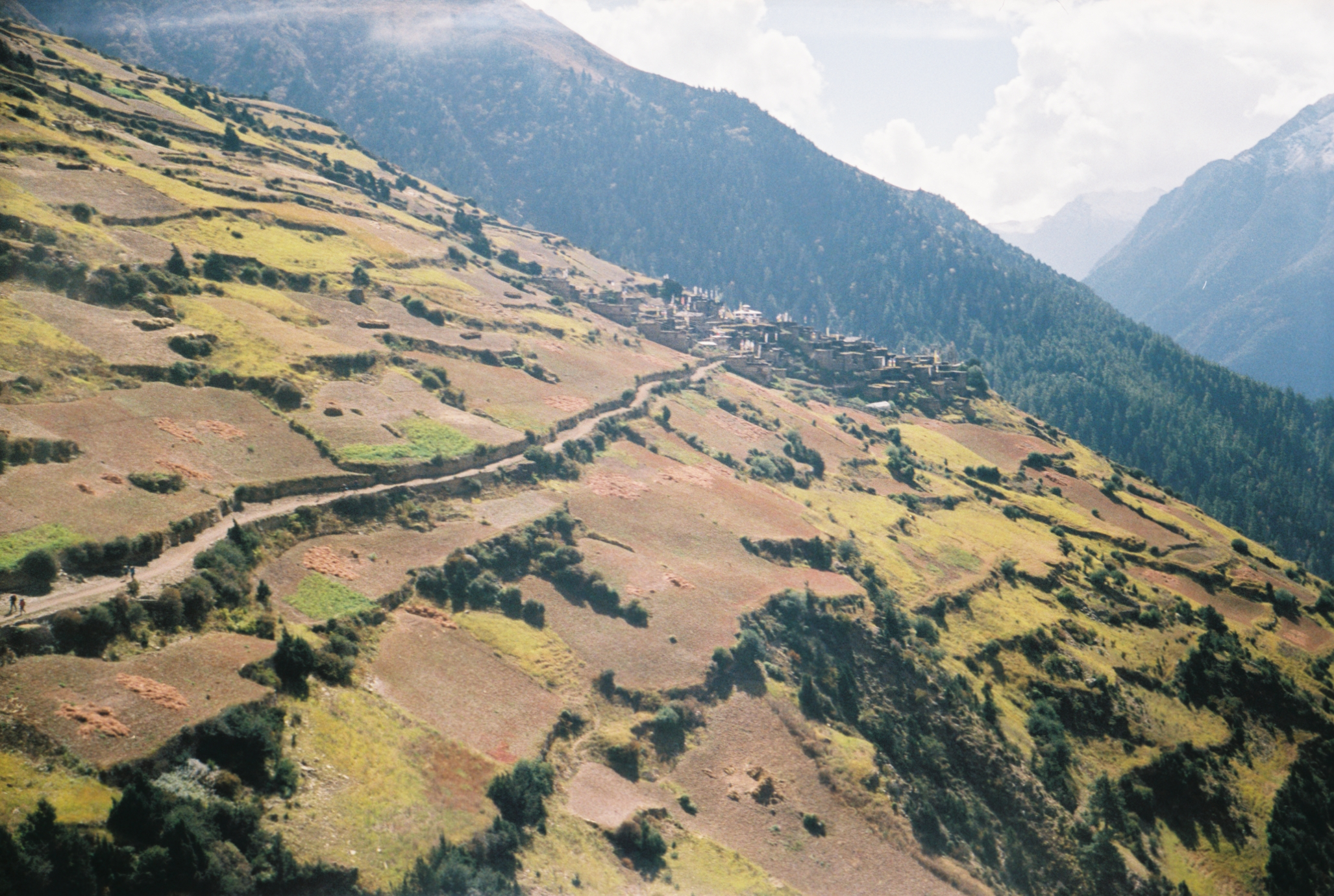

- Location in Nepal
- Coordinates: 28.66°N 84.15°E
- Country: Nepal
- Zone: Gandaki Zone
- District: Manang District
- Elevation: 3,730 m (12,240 ft)

Population (2011)
  - Total: 71
- Time zone: UTC+5:45 (Nepal Time)

Ghyaru is a village development committee in Manang District, located in the Gandaki Zone of northern Nepal. At the time of the 2011 Nepal census, it had a population of 71 people living in 33 individual households.

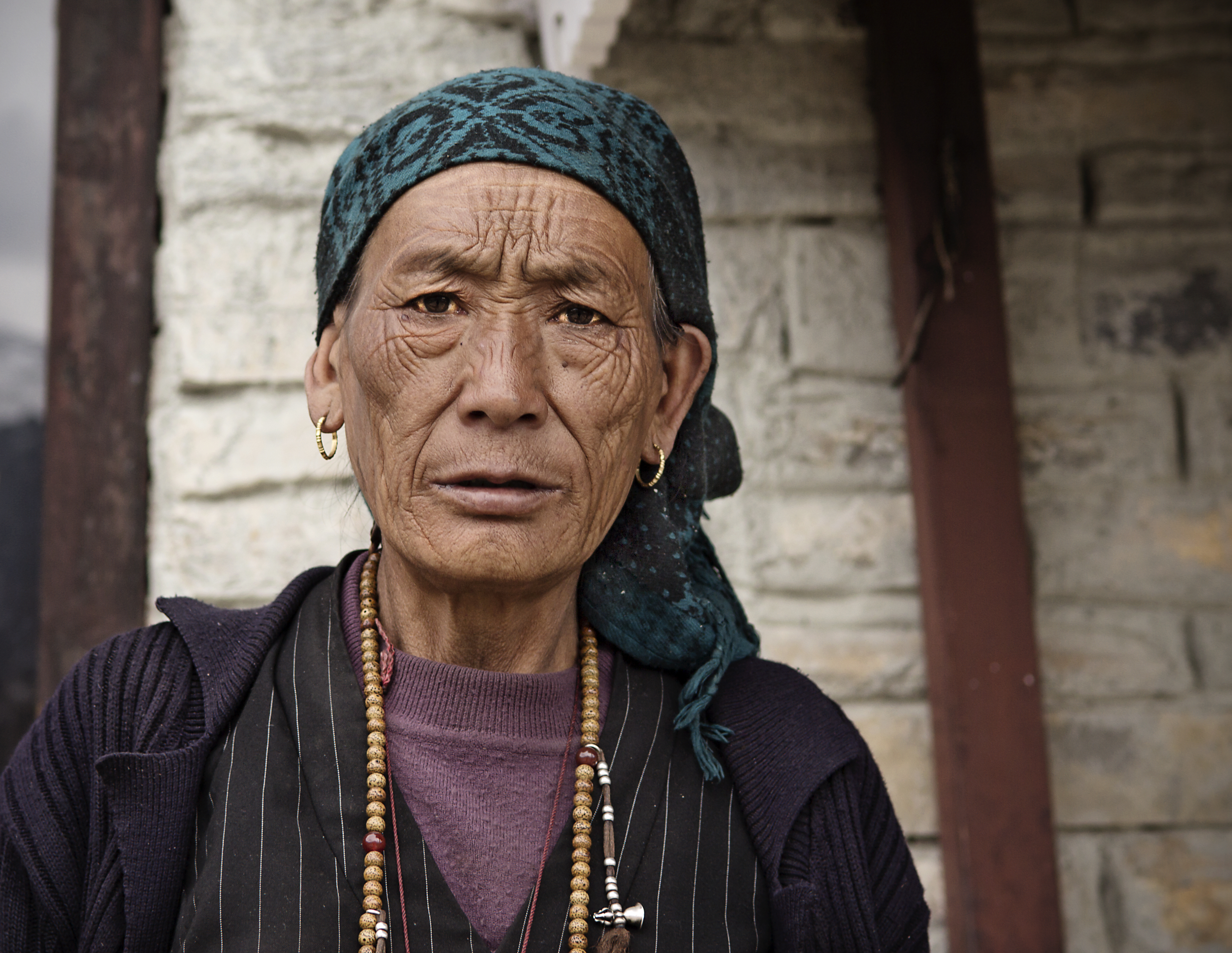
Nepali woman photographed on the Annapurna Circuit in Ghyaru.
