= Nesyang Rural Municipality =

Nesyang Rural Municipality ङिस्याङ गाउँपालिका
- Gaunpalika
- Location in Nepal
- Coordinates: 28.637394°N 84.0912568°E
- Country: Nepal
- Province: Gandaki
- District: Manang District
- Time zone: UTC+5:45 (Nepal Time)
- Website: http://nesyangmun.gov.np/

Nesyang Rural Municipality (Nepali: ङिस्याङ गाउँपालिका) is a Gaunpalika in Manang District in Gandaki Province of Nepal. On 12 March 2017, the government of Nepal implemented a new local administrative structure, in which VDCs have been replaced with municipal and Village Councils. Manang Ngisyang is one of these 753 local units.
