= Tanki Online =

Massive multiplayer online game

- Developer: AlternativaPlatform
- Platforms: HTML5 (2020–present); Adobe Flash (2009–2020); Android IOS; Nintendo Switch
- Release: June 4, 2009
- Genres: Vehicular combat Action; MMOG
- Mode: Multiplayer

Tanki Online (TO) (Russian: Танки Онлайн) is a browser-based multiplayer free-to-play video game created and published by AlternativaPlatform. It was released on June 4, 2009.

== History ==
=== Early days ===
Tanki Online's history began in the late 90s - a prototype called Tanks for Two was developed on floppy disks, only to die out as technology moved from floppy disks to CDs and the developers lost their source code. Later, in 2008, the developers would work together again on a demo called Tanks. The developers began working on a full-scale MMO action game based on this demo in 2009, which became Tanki Online.

The game was presented in May 2009 at the Russian Game Developers Conference 2009 conference, where it won "Best Non-Publisher Game" and "Best Technology" awards.Tanki Online used the company's own game engine, Alternativa3D, which ran on the Adobe Flash platform. The release took place in the same year.

In 2012, Update 1.100 was released, which gave the game's graphics got a major overhaul, along with a new battle mode: Control Points. While the new battle mode was liked by players, the new graphics received mixed feedback.

In 2013 and 2014, the project became the winner of the "Runet Prize" in the "Popular Vote" category.

=== Further development ===
In the late 2009 work on a new game - Tanki 2.0 began, however the project was eventually cancelled. Step by step, the ideas planned for Tanki 2.0 would instead be implemented in the existing game.

A new version of Tanki Online called Tanki X was created, made by the same developers. In this case, the developers used the Unity game engine instead of their own. Work on the game began in mid-2014. Tanki X was being developed in parallel with Tanki Online. In late 2019, it was announced that Tanki X was closing. The game shut down in early 2020, but some features were transferred to Tanki Online.

=== Client change ===
Due to the discontinuation of Adobe Flash Player, the game engine was changed from Flash to HTML5, making it another client for the game. The new version had an updated interface and some other visual components. On 20 August 2021, the Flash version of Tanki Online was discontinued, leaving HTML5 as the only playable version.

=== Conversion to keys ===
On 21 September 2023, it was announced that Containers would be converted into Keys. This change was made in order to stop Containers from turning into "Old Containers" after rewards from Containers were changed. This meant that players could save up Keys and then open up-to-date Containers at any time. Before Containers were converted, players had the option to convert them to Keys (1 key per 10 containers). If you didn't choose to convert them, all Containers would be automatically opened after the conversion. On 22 December 2023, the conversion took place.

== Gameplay ==
The gameplay of Tanki Online has some parallels with the 1985 game Battle City. Unlike Battle City, the basis of the gameplay of Tanki Online is a player versus player system. Players compete with each other: every destroyed tank counts a frag and the player who made the frag receives experience points.

The game has several battle modes (including teamplay-based modes), a system of military ranks and a lot of options for tank customization. Instead of choosing a tank from a pre-made list, players are encouraged to assemble their own battle machine, combining turrets, hulls, protective modules, drones, and decorative paints, according to their preferences.

When the player is finished with customizing their tank, they can enter into a battle with other players, where, in addition to experience points, they can earn one of the game's currencies - crystals. Moving up the career ladder, they open up access to new options and products.

The players can strengthen their tank on the battlefield with the help of supply drop boxes: boosted damage, boosted armor, speed boost and the repair kit. The fifth drop box is the “Nuclear Energy”, which when picked up recharges the Overdrive – a unique hull ability. Players also can purchase the supplies in the garage and use them on the battlefield anytime.

There is also a sixth drop box, called "Crystal Box", that gives 10 crystals upon collecting it, but they only show up in battles from Recruit to Master Sergeant and in event modes.

There are four currencies in the game: Crystals, Rubies, Tankoins and Stars.

Crystals are used to purchase equipment (turrets, hulls, protective modules and drones) in the garage, augments for turrets and supplies. Crystals are earned by playing in battles, completing challenges, opening containers, opening coinboxes, taking Gold Boxes (drop boxes that contain 1000 crystals), taking Megagolds (drop boxes that contain 10000 crystals), using promocodes, participating in contests from the game helpers and developers and by buying them in the shop.

Players can buy keys to open containers, crystals, skins, paints, the ability to change their nickname, a clan license, and Gold Boxes for Rubies. Rubies are earned by completing challenges and missions, catching Ruby Megagolds (drop boxes that contain 10 rubies), or by buying them in the shop from exclusive offers. Tankoins are earned by opening coinboxes, purchasing them with real money. Both currencies can be earned by using promocodes, and participating in contests from the game helpers and developers.

Stars are needed to complete Challenges. It can be earned by finishing battles, completeing missions and by buying them in the shop.

There are also special currencies, but they are only used for in-game events and minigames.
