= Tanki Manang =

Tanki Manang टंकीमनाङ
- Village development committee
- Location in Nepal Tanki Manang (Nepal)
- Coordinates: 28.75°N 83.96°E
- Country: Nepal
- Zone: Gandaki Zone
- District: Manang District

Population (2011)
  - Total: 377
- Time zone: UTC+5:45 (Nepal Time)

Tanki Manang is a village development committee in Manang District in the Gandaki Zone of northern Nepal. At the time of the 2011 Nepal census it had a population of 377 people living in 110 individual households.
