= Pisang Peak =

Mountain in Nepal

- Jong Ri
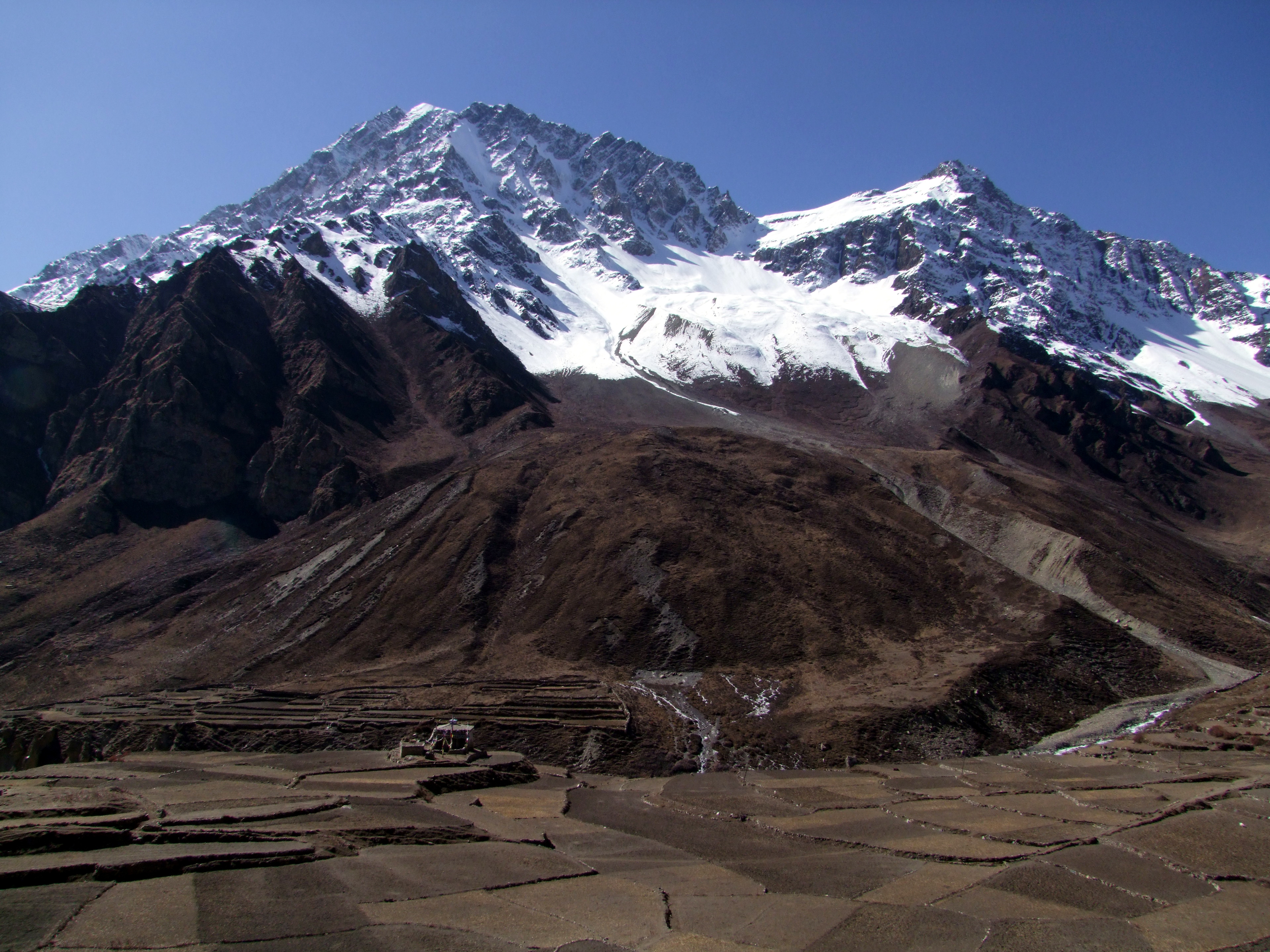
- Pisang Peak from Naar village

Highest point
- Elevation: 6,091 m (19,984 ft)
- Prominence: 887 m (2,910 ft)
- Listing: Mountains of Nepal
- Coordinates: 28°38′46″N 84°11′18″E

Geography
- Location within Nepal
- Location: Manang District, Nepal
- Parent range: Damodar Himalaya

Climbing
- First ascent: 1955 by a German team
- Easiest route: Scramble/glacier/ice climb

Pisang Peak (Jong Ri) is a pyramidal trekking peak above Pisang, a village on the Annapurna Circuit, within the Manang District, northern Nepal. It was first climbed by a German Expedition in 1955.

In 1994, Pisang Peak became the site of what has been called the "Pisang Tragedy", one of Nepal's worst climbing disasters. On November 13, 1994, 11 people, including nine Germans, one Swiss and one Nepalese died in an avalanche. After reaching the summit, the climbing party started a windslab avalanche, which swept the group over 600 meters to their deaths. The entire expedition party was killed in the accident. One week later, a rescue team found the bodies of the climbers huddled together on the snowfield.
