= Bhakra, Nepal =

Bhraka, Nepal भ्राका
- Village development committee
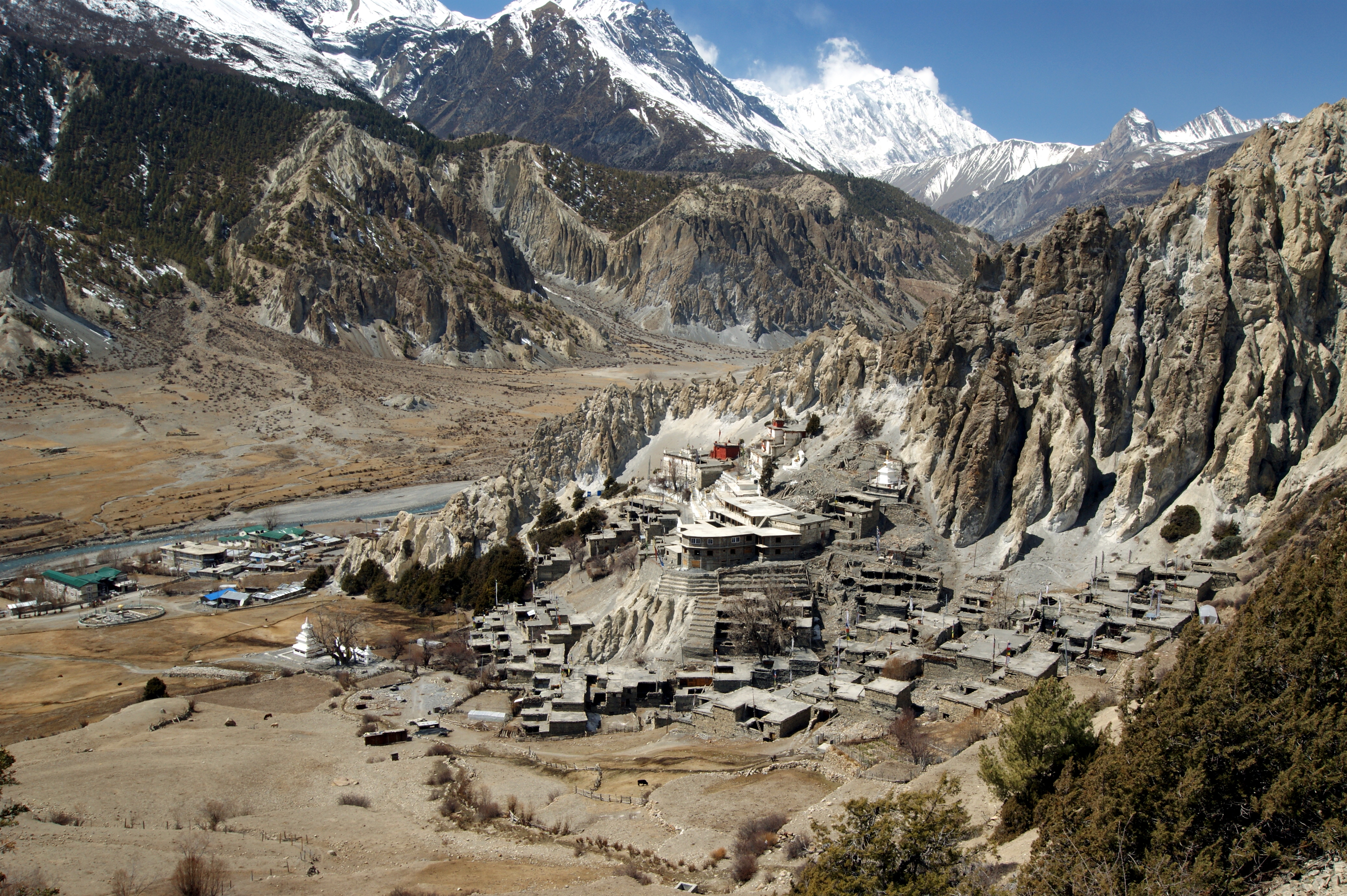
- Bhraka as seen from the north east

- Location in Nepal Bhraka, Nepal (Nepal)
- Coordinates: 28.39°N 84.03°E
- Country: Nepal
- Zone: Gandaki Zone
- District: Manang District

Population (2011)
  - Total: 306
- Time zone: UTC+5:45 (Nepal Time)

Bhraka, Nepal is a village development committee in Manang District in the Gandaki Zone of northern Nepal. At the time of the 2011 Nepal census it had a population of 306 people living in 83 individual households.
