= Nyawal =

Ngawal नावल Nawal
- Village development committee
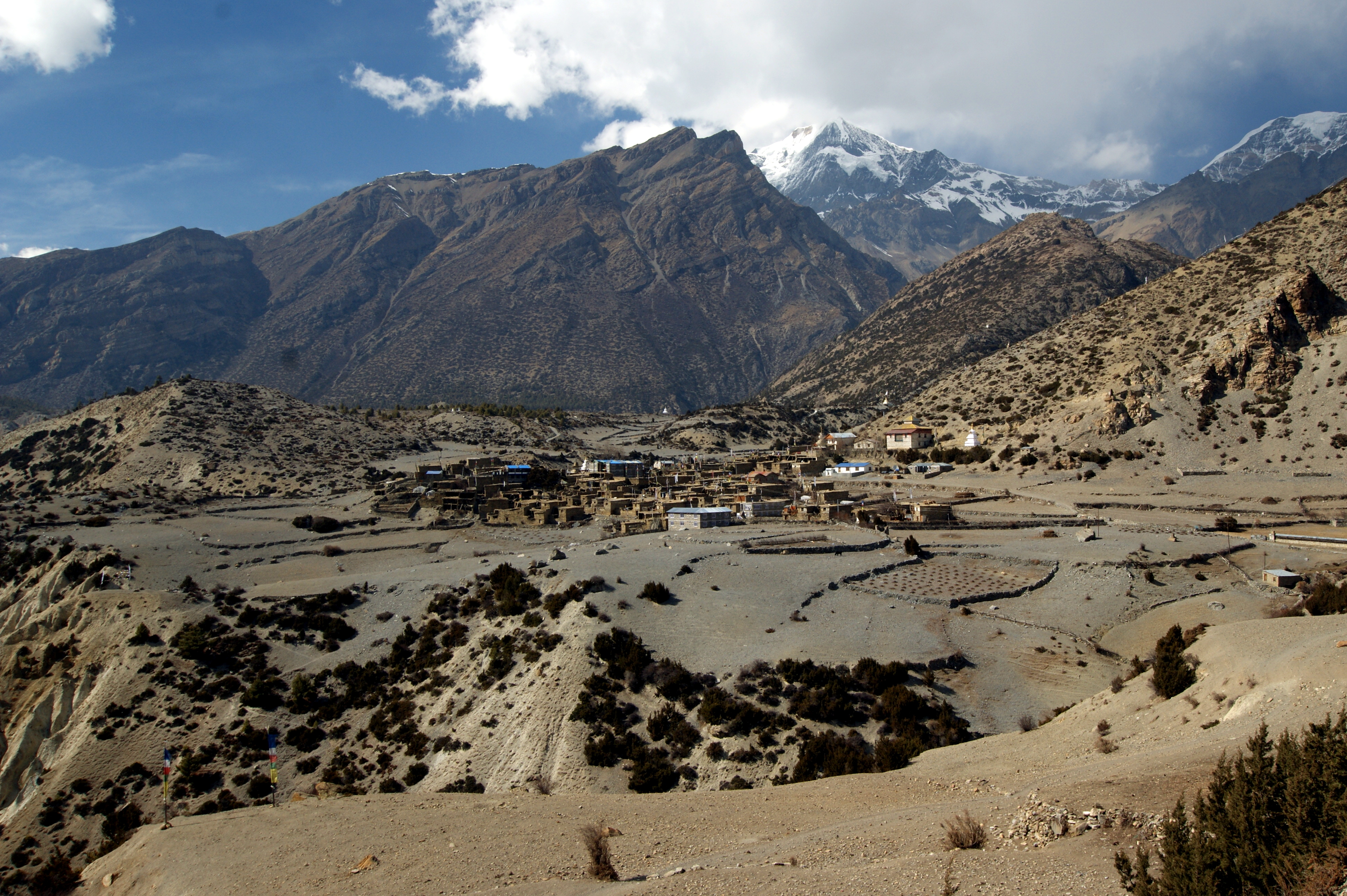
- Ngawal
- Nickname: Pongpa (Nyeshang)
- Location in Nepal Ngawal (Nepal)
- Coordinates: 28.67°N 84.11°E
- Country: Nepal
- Zone: Gandaki Zone
- District: Manang District

Population (2011)
  - Total: 274
- Time zone: UTC+5:45 (Nepal Time)

Ngawal (Nawal) is a village development committee in Manang District in the Gandaki Zone of northern Nepal. At the time of the 2011 Nepal census it had a population of 274. Ngawal VDC is one of the Seven Village Development Committee in Upper Manang. One of the main attraction of this village is a centuries-old cave of Guru Rinpoche that is on the hills overlooking Ngawal village. The local people believes the cave leads to Mustang. And a monastery in Tibetan Nyingma pa sect which is called Portoche Monastery.
