= Nason Rural Municipality =

Nason Rural Municipality नासाेँ गाउँपालिका
- Gaunpalika
- Location in Nepal Nason Rural Municipality (Nepal)
- Coordinates: 28.518759°N 84.358044°E
- Country: Nepal
- Province: Gandaki
- District: Manang District
- Time zone: UTC+5:45 (Nepal Time)
- Website: http://nasonmun.gov.np/

Nason Rural Municipality (Nason Gaupalika) (Nepali: नासोँ गाउँपालिका) is a Gaunpalika in Manang District in Gandaki Province of Nepal. On 12 March 2017, the government of Nepal implemented a new local administrative structure, in which VDCs have been replaced with municipal and Village Councils. Nason is one of these 753 local units.
