= Tanki X =

Arcade tank simulator game

- Developer: AlternativaPlatform
- Publisher: AlternativaPlatform
- Engine: Unity
- Platforms: Microsoft Windows, macOS
- Release: April 20, 2017 – December 31, 2019
- Genres: Action, vehicular combat
- Mode: Multiplayer

Tanki X was an arcade vehicular combat massively multiplayer online video game. It was created on the Unity engine by AlternativaPlatform, an independent Russia-based game development company.

The game used the free-to-play business model, where players could download and play the game for free. However, players could also pay real-world money in the form of micro transactions to get "X Crystals". These X Crystals unlocked special cosmetic features for tanks and blueprint containers which could unlock and upgrade modules. The open beta testing started on September 15, 2016 and the full game was released on Steam on April 20, 2017. The game was shut down at the end of 2019. In 2021, a fan-made Tanki X server was launched, which is called Revive Tanki.

== Gameplay ==
Players controlled their own tank, created from a variety of turret and hull combinations, and competed against each other in a variety of maps and game modes. Tanki X featured three game modes: Deathmatch, Team Deathmatch, and Capture the Flag. Players could create their own tank combination from a selection of different turrets and hulls, all unique in their strengths and weaknesses.

Capture the Flag on Tanki X map "Area 159".

=== In-game currency and ranking system ===
For every tank destroyed or flag captured, players built up a number of XP (rank experience points) which they were rewarded, and container points. The number of experience gained was based on various factors including the number of opponents destroyed, killstreak and the amount of XP earned throughout the match. The amount of XP players gain had its own set of rewards. Players gained new ranks at particular XP milestones which publicly represented their level of skill, dedication, and time playing the game.

Players could also buy X Crystals. X Crystals were a premium currency, which was bought with real-world money and unlocked special skins, graffiti, special shell colors for turret ammo, paints for tanks and containers for module blueprints. X crystals could also be earned by completing missions and entering certain promo codes.

=== Ranked battles ===
The ranked battle system was a ranking ladder which organized players using RP (reputation points), which were rewarded or lost at the end of a completed battle. These points placed players within a certain league, depending on how much RP they had. From lowest to highest, there were 5 leagues: Training, Bronze, Silver, Gold, and Masters. Upon entering a league for the first time, the game would grant players with the paint and 5 containers for the corresponding league. Every 2 months, the league system entered a new season. At that time, the game would award players with crystals, X crystals, and league containers for the league they ended the season in. The game also reduced each player's RP by a certain amount, depending on where they were at.

== Reason for shutdown ==
When Tanki X was released, the developers believed it could replace their original game, Tanki Online. However, most players continued playing Tanki Online, and Tanki X did not receive the reaction the company had hoped for. In the end, they had to continue releasing new updates and content for Tanki Online, which they had originally intended to abandon, putting a strain on the company's budget. It was eventually decided that Tanki X was not profitable, and the game was shut down in favor of continued development of Tanki Online.

== See also ==
- Tanki Online
