= Middle Marsyangdi Hydropower Station =

Hydro-electric plant in Lamjung district of western Nepal

Middle Marsyandgi Hydropower Station
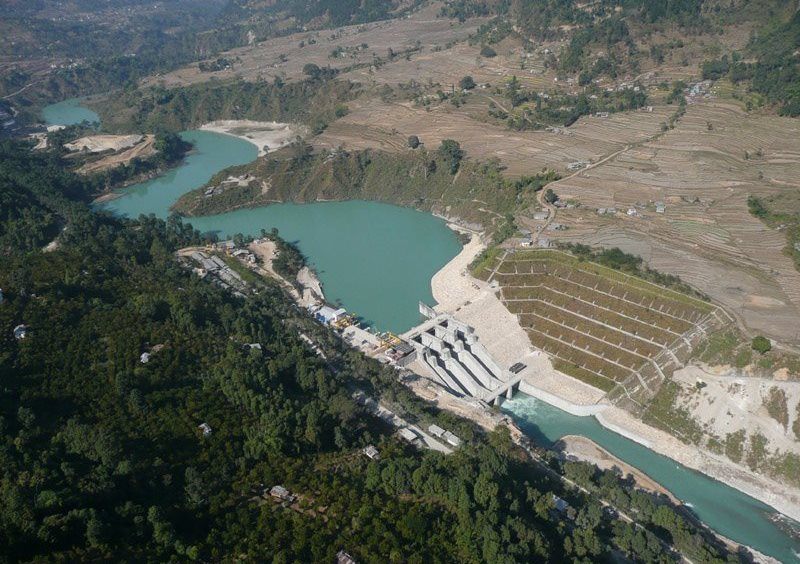

- Location within Nepal
- Official name: Middle Marsyandgi Hydropower Station
- Country: Nepal
- Location: Lamjung District
- Coordinates: 28°8′27″N 84°26′24″E
- Purpose: Power
- Status: Operational
- Owner: Nepal Electricity Authority

Dam and spillways
- Type of dam: Barrage, Gravity
- Impounds: Marshyangdi River

Middle Marsyandgi Hydropower Station
- Commission date: 2057-03-12 BS
- Type: Run-of-the-river
- Turbines: 2x 35MW
- Installed capacity: 70 MW

Middle Marsyandgi Hydropower Station (Nepali:मध्य मर्स्याङ्दी जलविद्युत आयोजना) is a run-of-river hydro-electric plant located in Lamjung district of western Nepal. The flow from Marshyangdi River is used to generate 70 MW electricity. The plant is connected to the national grid of Nepal.

The plant was set to be commissioned in 2004 but it was delayed by four years. The plant faces siltation problems from time to time.

== See also ==
- Marsyangdi Hydropower Station (another 69 MW station in the same river)
- List of power stations in Nepal
