= Marsyangdi Hydropower Station =

Hydropower station in Nepal

Marsyangdi Hydropower Project
- Location within Nepal
- Official name: मर्स्याङ्दी जलविद्युत आयोजना
- Country: Nepal
- Coordinates: 27.9256°N 84.49736°E
- Purpose: Power
- Status: Operational
- Opening date: 5 November, 1989
- Owner: Nepal Electricity Authority

Dam and spillways
- Type of dam: Barrage
- Impounds: Marshyangdi River

Marsyangdi Hydropower Station
- Commission date: 5 November 1989
- Type: Run-of-the-river
- Turbines: Vertical Axis Francis
- Installed capacity: 3x26 MW

Marsyangdi Hydropower Station (मर्स्याङ्दी जलविद्युत आयोजना)is a run-of-river hydro-electric plant located in Aanbukhaireni, Tanahu District of Nepal. The flow from the Marshyangdi River is used to generate 69 MW electricity and 462.5 GWh of annual energy. The rated net head is 90.5 m and rated flow is 30.5 m^{3}/s. The plant is owned and operated by Nepal Electricity Authority. The plant started generating electricity since 1989AD. The power station is connected to the national grid.

== Finance ==
The project was financed by a Nepal government in assistance from IDA, KFW, KFED, SFD, ADB and GON at a cost of US$22 million.

== See also ==
- Upper Marsyandgi A Hydroelectric Station
- List of power stations in Nepal
