= Nar, Nepal =

Nar नार
- Village development committee
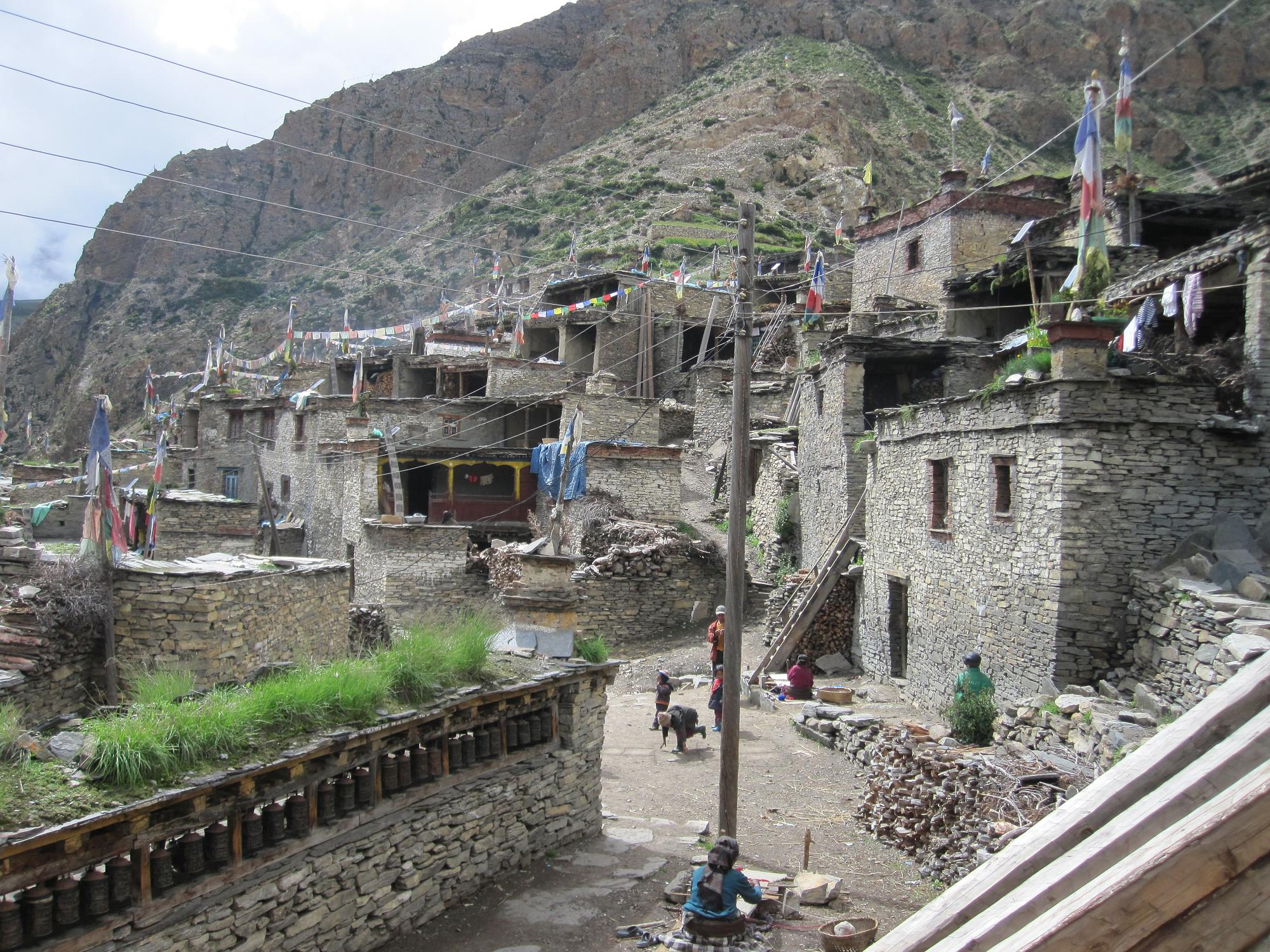
- A settlement in Nar VDC

- Location in Nepal Nar (Nepal)
- Coordinates: 28.6810771°N 84.1986344°E
- Country: Nepal
- Zone: Gandaki Zone
- District: Manang District

Population (2011)
  - Total: 362
- Time zone: UTC+5:45 (Nepal Time)

Nar (Nepali: नार) is a village located in the Narpa Bhumi Rural Municipality, Manang District, Gandaki, Nepal. It is popularly recognized as a prominent part of Nar Phu Valley. The villagers claim that they have been living in the harsh environment of the Himalayas for at least thousand years. In the 2021 Nepal census, the village had 126 households, with average household size of 3.14.
