= Chame Rural Municipality =

Chame चाँमे
- Municipality
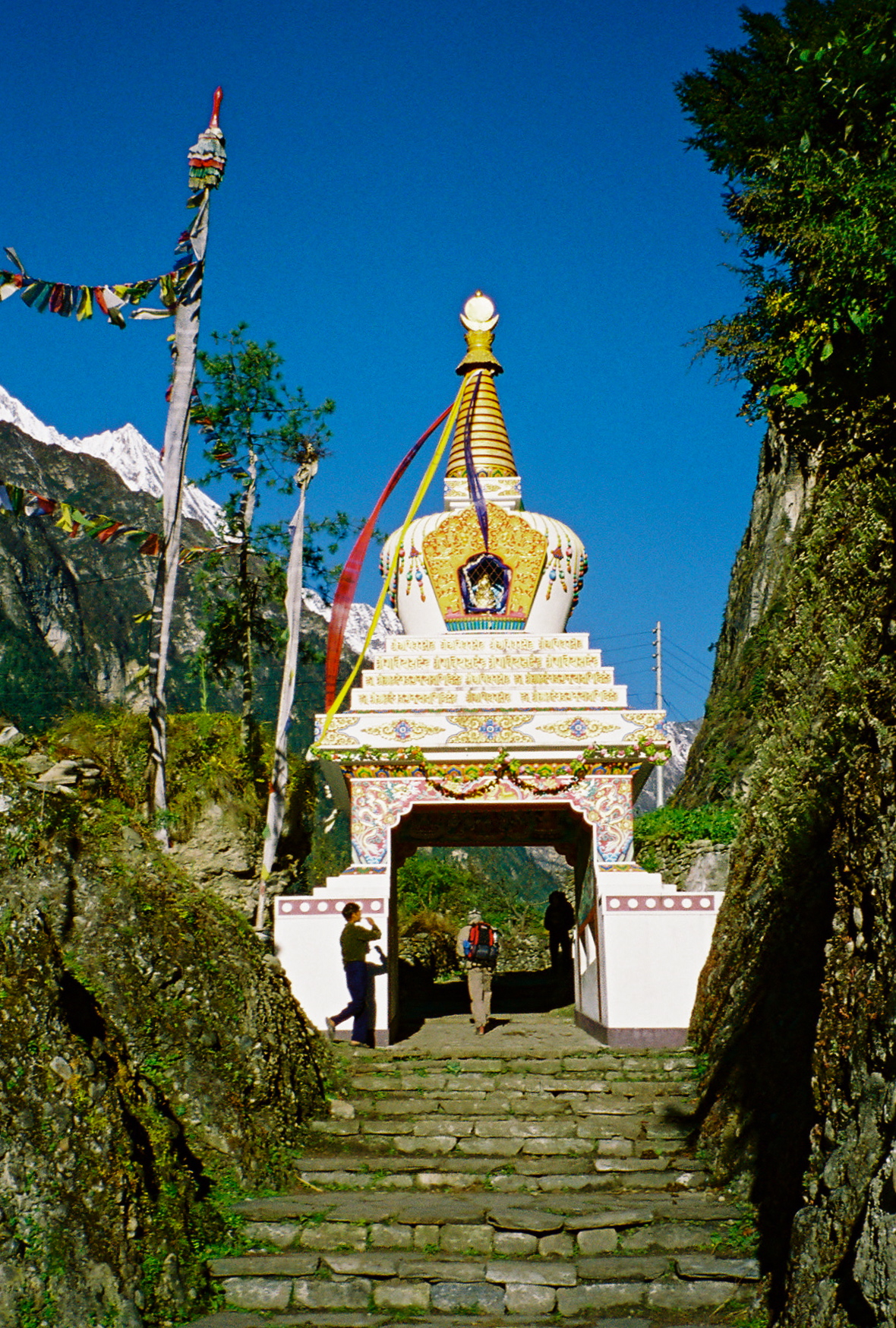

- Location in Nepal Chame (Nepal)
- Coordinates: 28°33′7″N 84°14′27″E
- Country: Nepal
- Zone: Gandaki Zone
- District: Manang District
- Elevation: 2,650 m (8,690 ft)

Population (2011)
  - Total: 1,129
- Time zone: UTC+5:45 (Nepal Time)
- Website: http://chamemun.gov.np/

Chame (Nepali: चाँमे) is the headquarters of Manang District in the Gandaki Zone of northern Nepal. Chame village is located in Ward no. 2 of Chame village development committee, about 230 km from Kathmandu. At the time of the 2011 Nepal census it had a population of 1129 people living in 279 individual households. Manang District is the lowest populated district in Nepal.

== Climate ==
Climate data for Chame, elevation 2,680 m (8,790 ft), (1976–2005)
Month	Jan	Feb	Mar	Apr	May	Jun	Jul	Aug	Sep	Oct	Nov	Dec	Year
Mean daily maximum °C (°F)	9.5 (49.1)	11.0 (51.8)	14.7 (58.5)	18.2 (64.8)	20.1 (68.2)	20.9 (69.6)	20.2 (68.4)	19.9 (67.8)	19.3 (66.7)	17.2 (63.0)	14.4 (57.9)	11.4 (52.5)	16.4 (61.5)
Mean daily minimum °C (°F)	−2.4 (27.7)	0.3 (32.5)	2.9 (37.2)	5.6 (42.1)	7.7 (45.9)	10.1 (50.2)	10.6 (51.1)	10.4 (50.7)	9.7 (49.5)	5.9 (42.6)	2.2 (36.0)	−1.7 (28.9)	5.1 (41.2)
Average precipitation mm (inches)	29.4 (1.16)	49.7 (1.96)	73.0 (2.87)	49.5 (1.95)	60.3 (2.37)	115.3 (4.54)	189.6 (7.46)	169.3 (6.67)	134.5 (5.30)	47.9 (1.89)	13.9 (0.55)	17.2 (0.68)	949.6 (37.4)
Source 1: Agricultural Extension in South Asia
Source 2: Japan International Cooperation Agency (precipitation)

== 2015 Nepal earthquake ==
The village was affected by an earthquake on 25 April 2015. Reports from the area indicate that the roads and buildings of the village are damaged.
