= Marshyangdi River =

River in Nepal

Coordinates: 27°51′29″N 84°33′33″E

Marshyangdi
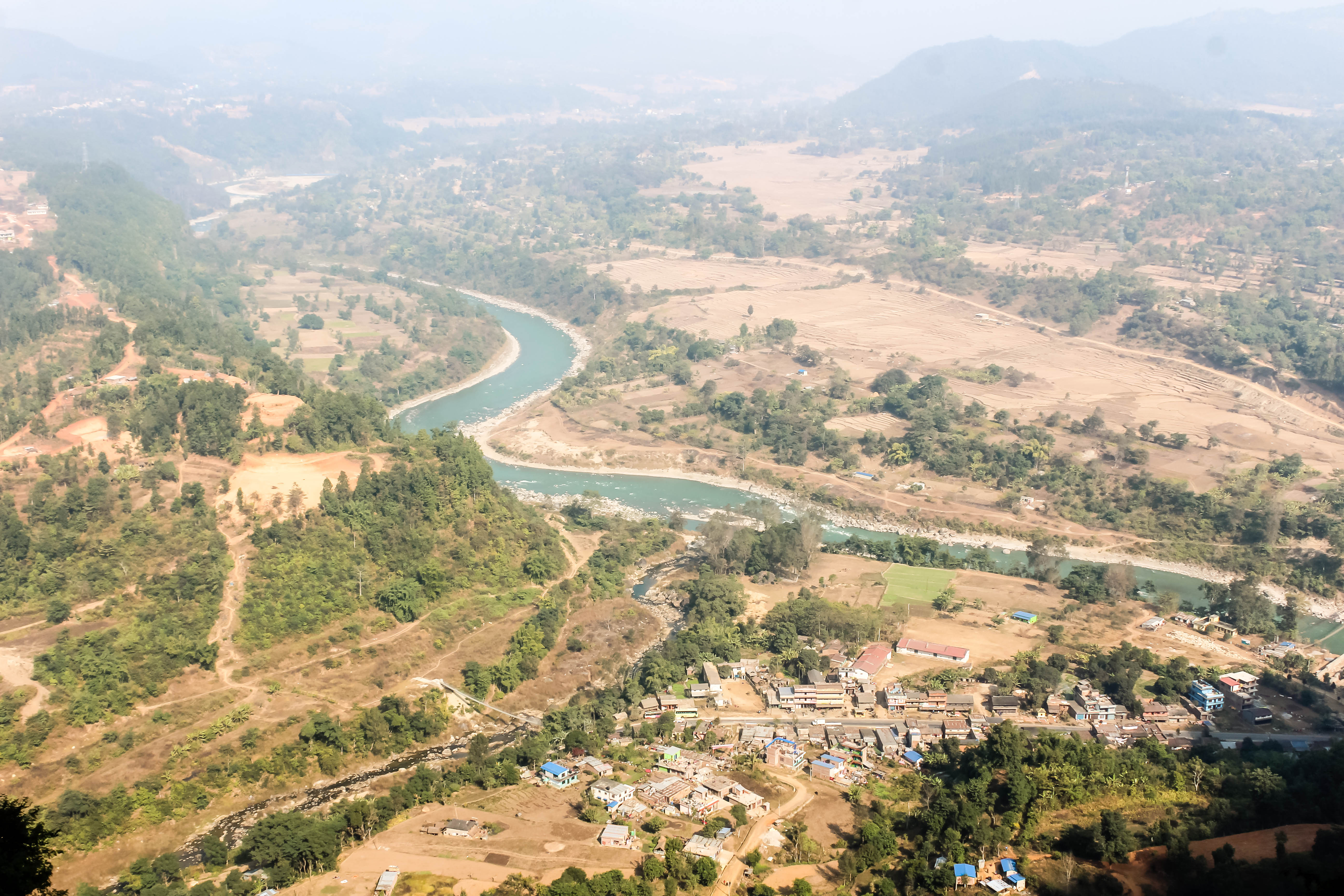
- Aerial View of Marsyangdi River

Location
- Country: Nepal

Physical characteristics
- Mouth
  - location: Trishuli
- Length: 150 km

Basin features
- River system: Narayani River
- Tributaries
  - left: Nagdi Khola, Dordi khola, Chepe Khola, Daraundi River
  - right: Paundi Khola, Chundi Khola

The Marshyangdi (or Marsyangdi) (Nepali: मर्स्याङ्दी, marśyāṅdī) is a mountain river in Nepal. Its length is about 150 km (93 mi).

The Marshyangdi begins at the confluence of two mountain rivers, the Khangsar Khola and the Jharsang Khola, northwest of the Annapurna massif at an altitude of 3,600 meters near Manang village. The Marshyangdi flows eastward through Manang District and then southward through Lamjung District.

The Marshyangdi joins the Trishuli river near Mugling as one of its tributaries.

The beginning of the Annapurna Circuit trekking route follows the Marshyangdi river valley.

== Tributaries ==
1. Khangsar River
2. Jharsang River
3. Dordi River
4. Paudi River
5. Chepe River
6. Chundi River
7. Daraudi
8.Nangdi River
9. Khudi River
10. Dhud River
11. Naar River

The Marshyangdi joins the Trishuli near Mugling.

== Infrastructures ==
- Upper Marsyandgi A Hydroelectric Station (50 MW)
- Middle Marsyangdi Hydropower Station (70 MW)
- Marsyangdi Hydropower Station (69 MW)

== Gallery ==
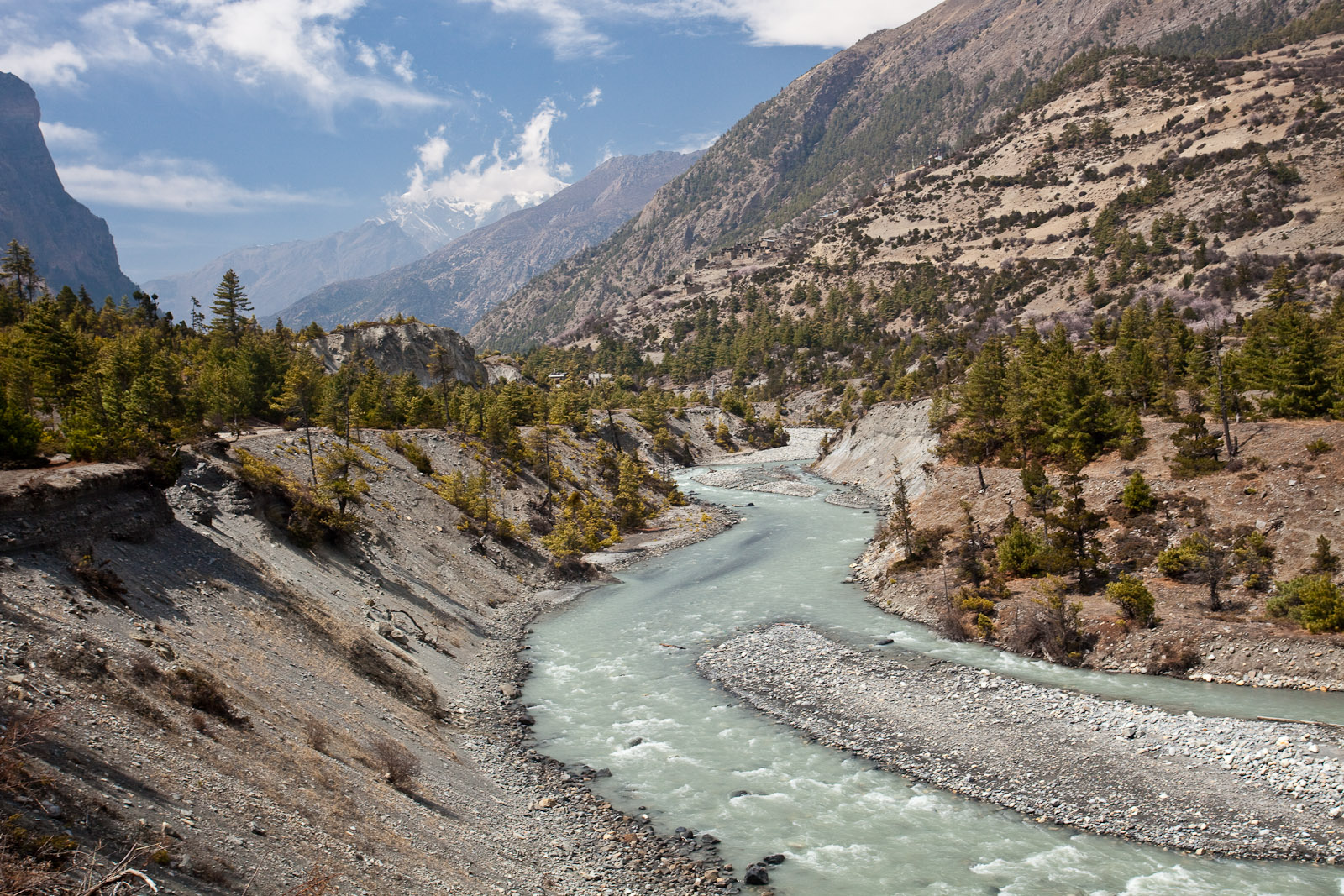
Marshyangdi river near Pisang village

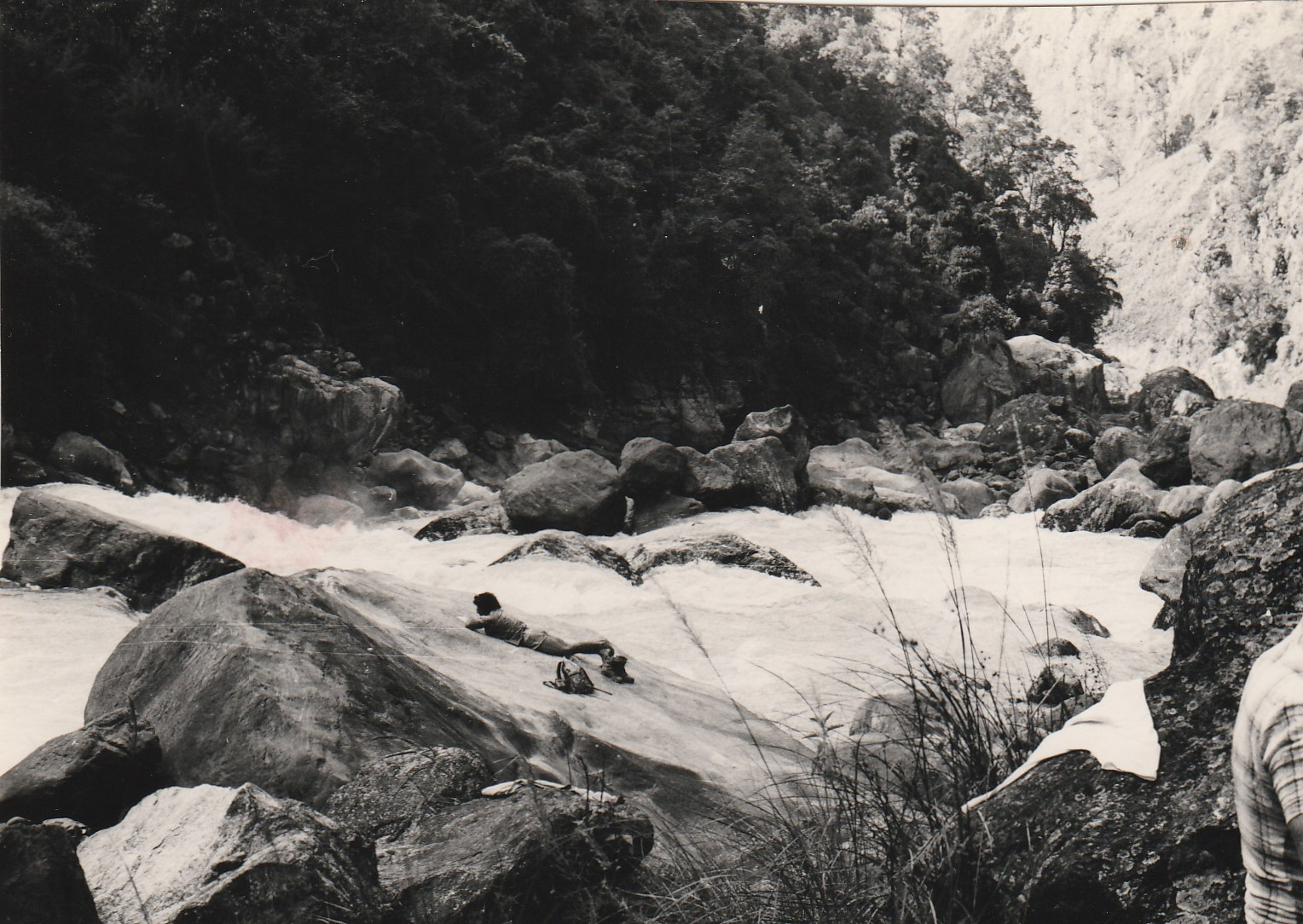
The river in 1980

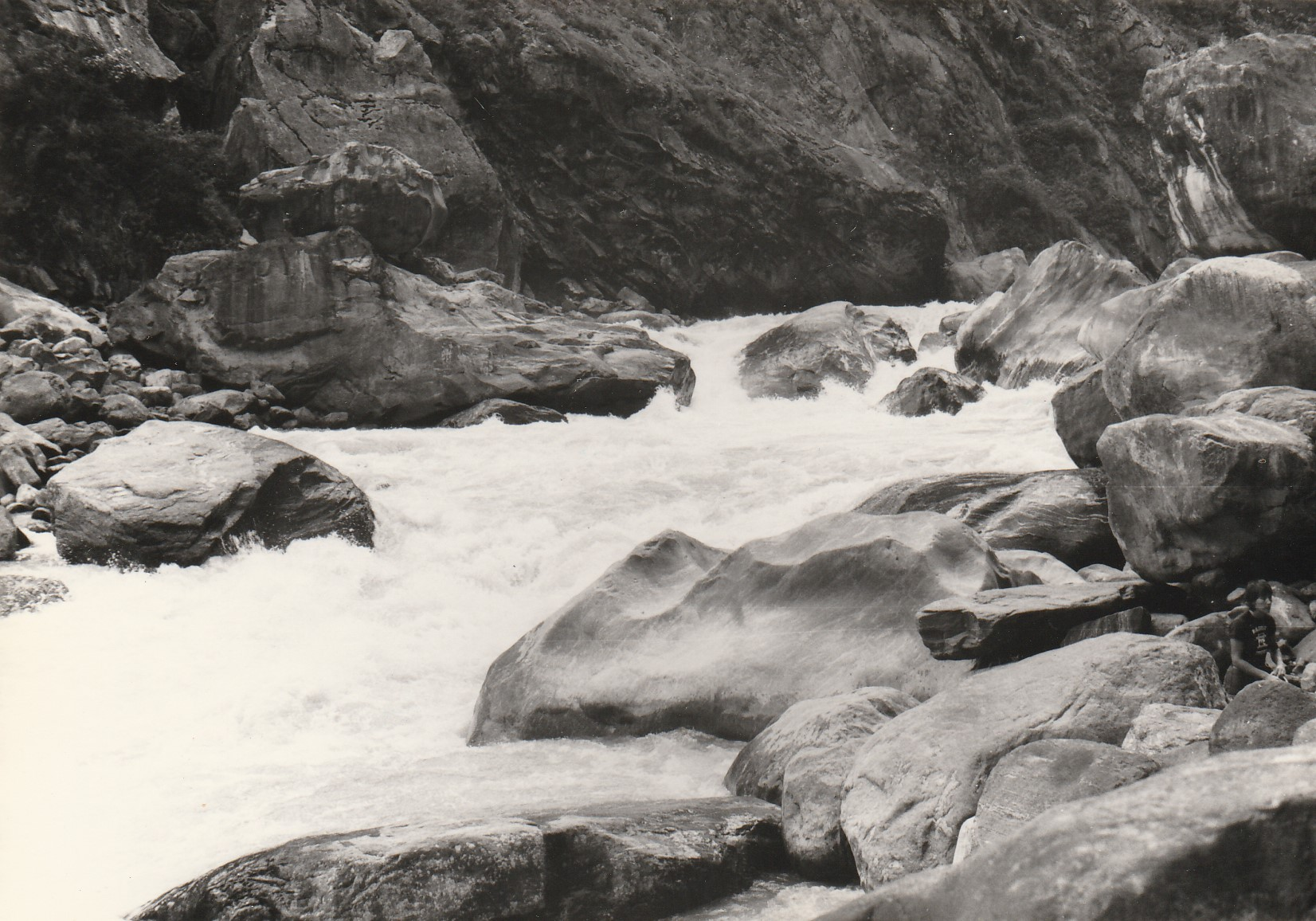
Rocks

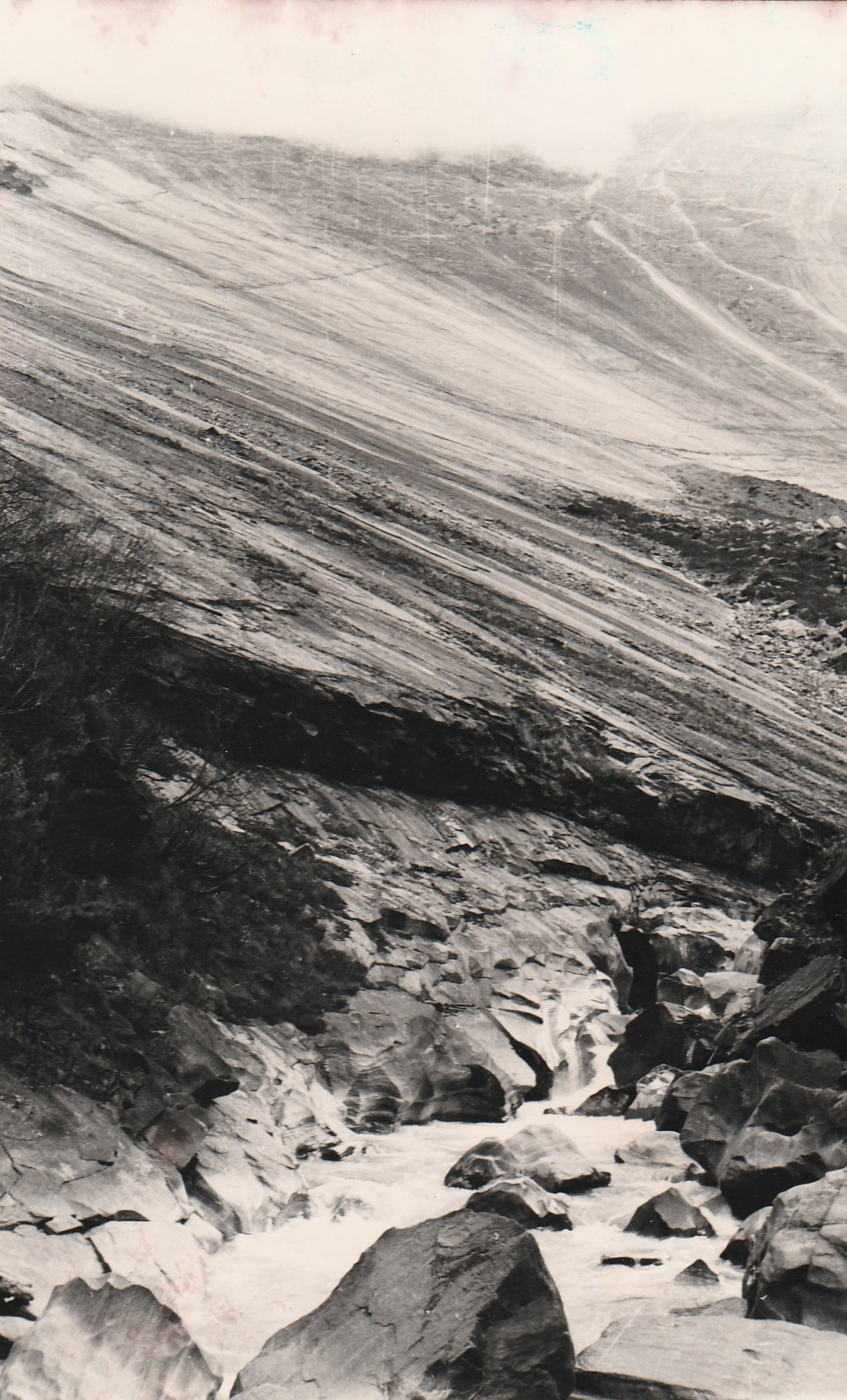
Uplands of the river

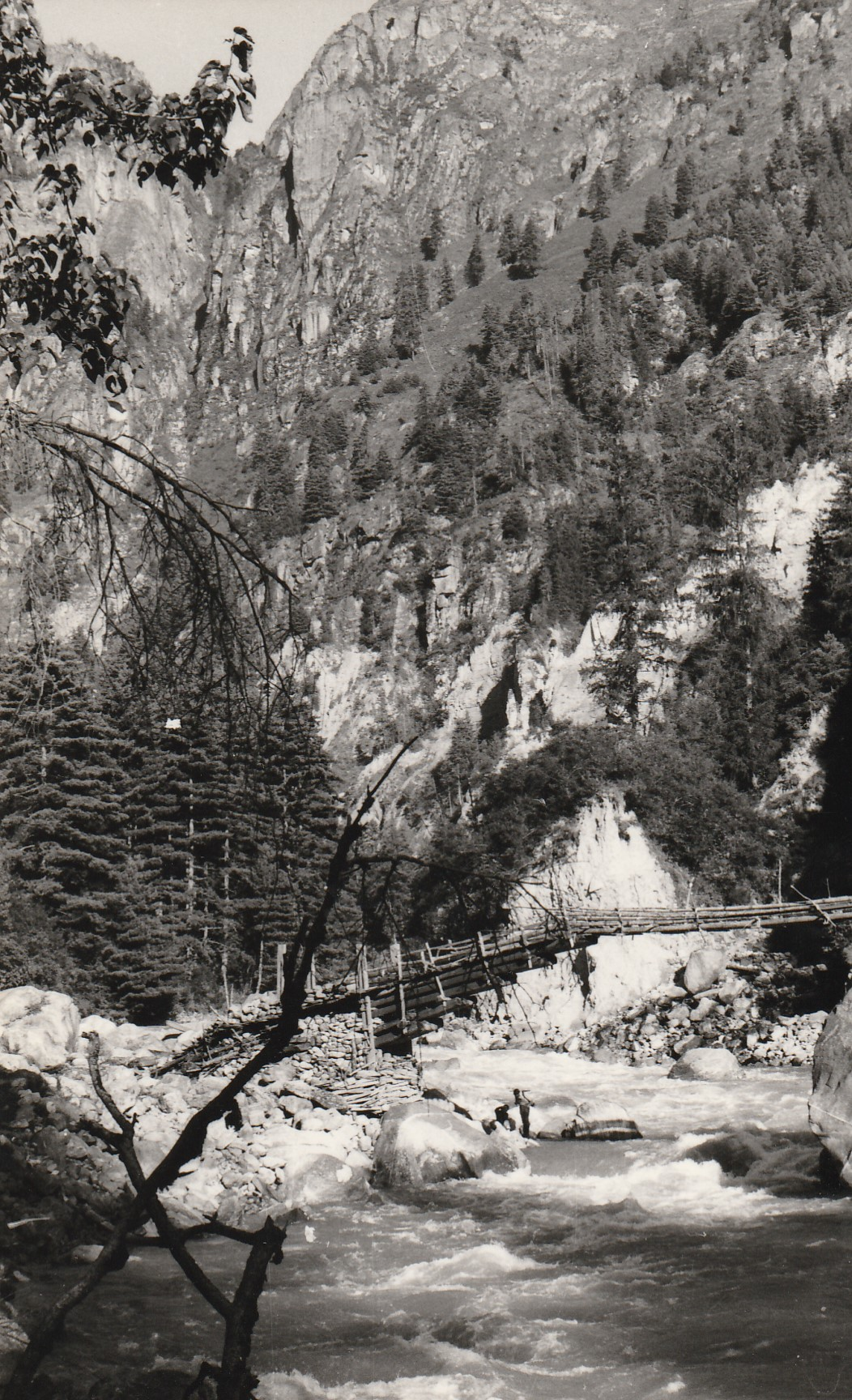
A bridge across the river

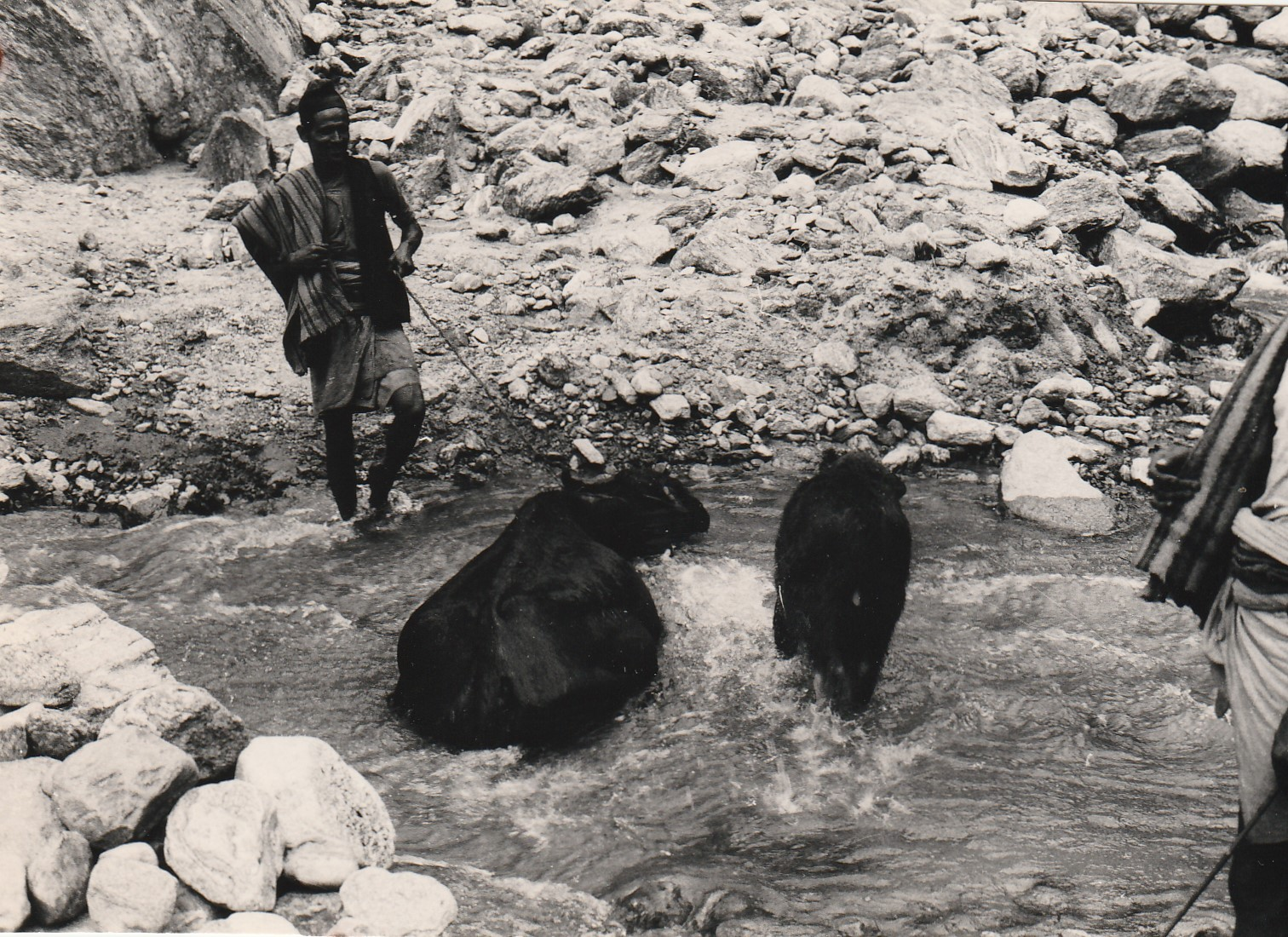
A man leading cows through part of the river
