= Manang District, Nepal =

District in Gandaki Pradesh, Nepal

Coordinates: 28°33′7″N 84°14′27″E

Manang District मनाङ
- District
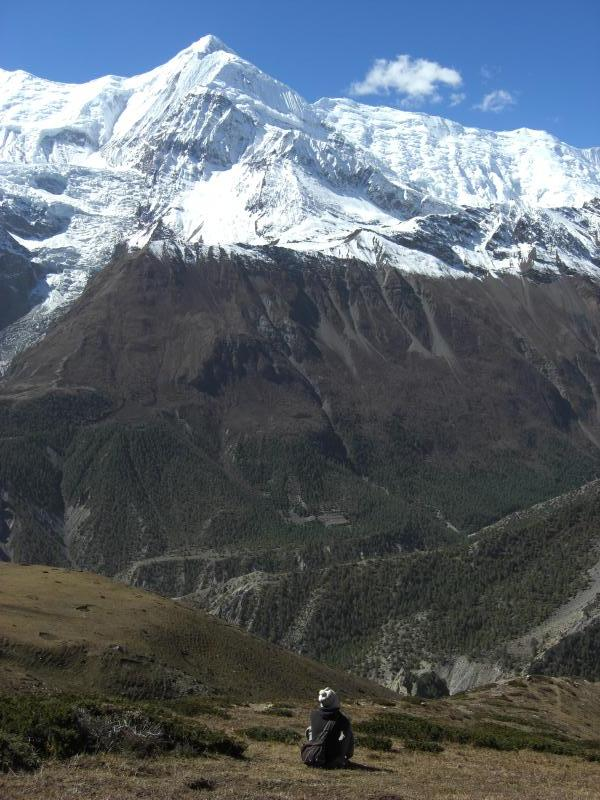
- Annapurna, Manang District
- Interactive map of Manang District
- Country: Nepal
- Province: Gandaki Province
- Admin HQ.: Chame
- Former HQ.: Thoche

Government
  - Type: Coordination committee
  - Body: DCC, Manang

Area
  - Total: 2,246 km^{2} (867 sq mi)

Population (2011)
  - Total: 6,538
  - Density: 2.911/km^{2} (7.539/sq mi)
- Time zone: UTC+05:45 (NPT)
- Telephone Code: 066
- Website: ddcmanang.gov.np

Manang District (Nepali: मनाङ जिल्ला, in Gandaki Province, is one of the seventy-seven districts of Nepal. The district, with Chame as its district headquarters, covers an area of 2,246 km^{2} (867 sq mi) and in 2011 had a population of 6,538.

The Thorung La pass, at 5,415 meters above sea level, connects the district with Mustang district by providing a route between the towns of Manang and Muktinath. Manang district gets the lowest amount of rainfall among the districts of Nepal as it lies to the north of the Himalayas, which block monsoon winds. The Manang Valley, which lies close to the Nepal-Tibet border, offers tremendous opportunities due to its rich natural flora and fauna. Three tracks start from here. The first, via Thorangla, Muktinath, and Mustang to Lhasa—a journey that takes four days; the second via Naur Khola and Naurgaon, which takes five days to Lhasa; and the third via Larkiya bazar, which is the one most commonly used by the people of Central Nepal.

Along with the Marwaris who have migrated from India to Nepal in large numbers, the Manangies are the best known traders of Nepal. They have received special dispensation from the King to trade in South East Asia, and travel abroad with precious stones and metals, musk, herbs and other items. They import ready-made garments, watches and electronic goods. Many of the Manangies spend as much as six months away from home, returning only during the summers. Many of them reside in Kathmandu, where their children study in English-medium schools. The parents' lack of proficiency in the English language is irrelevant as it in no way affects their trading skills.

Since the area was opened to outsiders in the late 1970s, many have switched from the traditional agriculture to hoteleering.

The trail from Manang to Muktinath has been used by the locals for hundreds of years to transport huge herds of sheep and yak in and out of Manang. It is an important route for the people of the region.

The northern parts of Manang Valley are dry, brown and desolate places, very different from the thick forests and brown green valleys of Sikkim and Eastern Nepal.

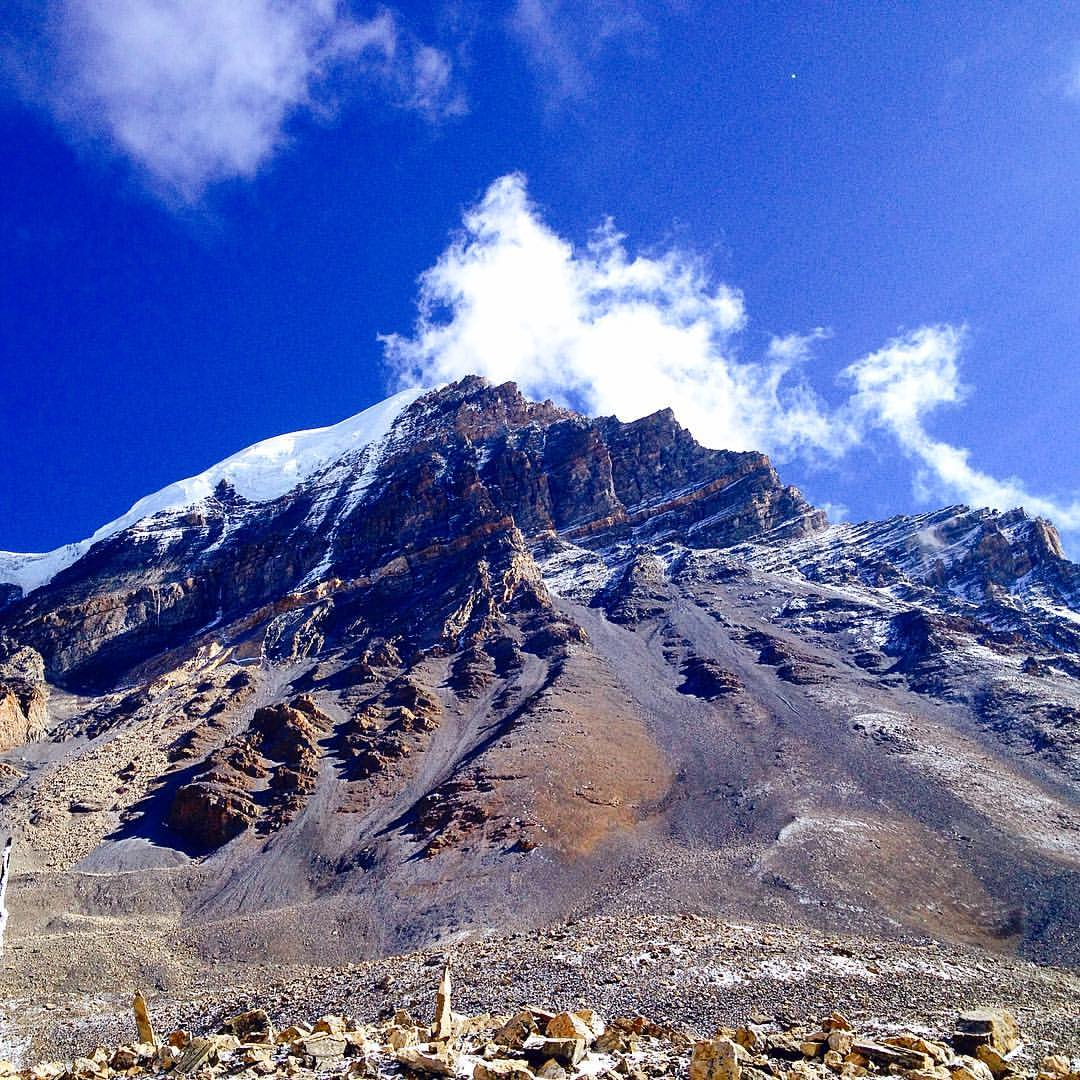
Thorangla pass with an elevation of 5,416 metres above sea level

== Geography and climate ==
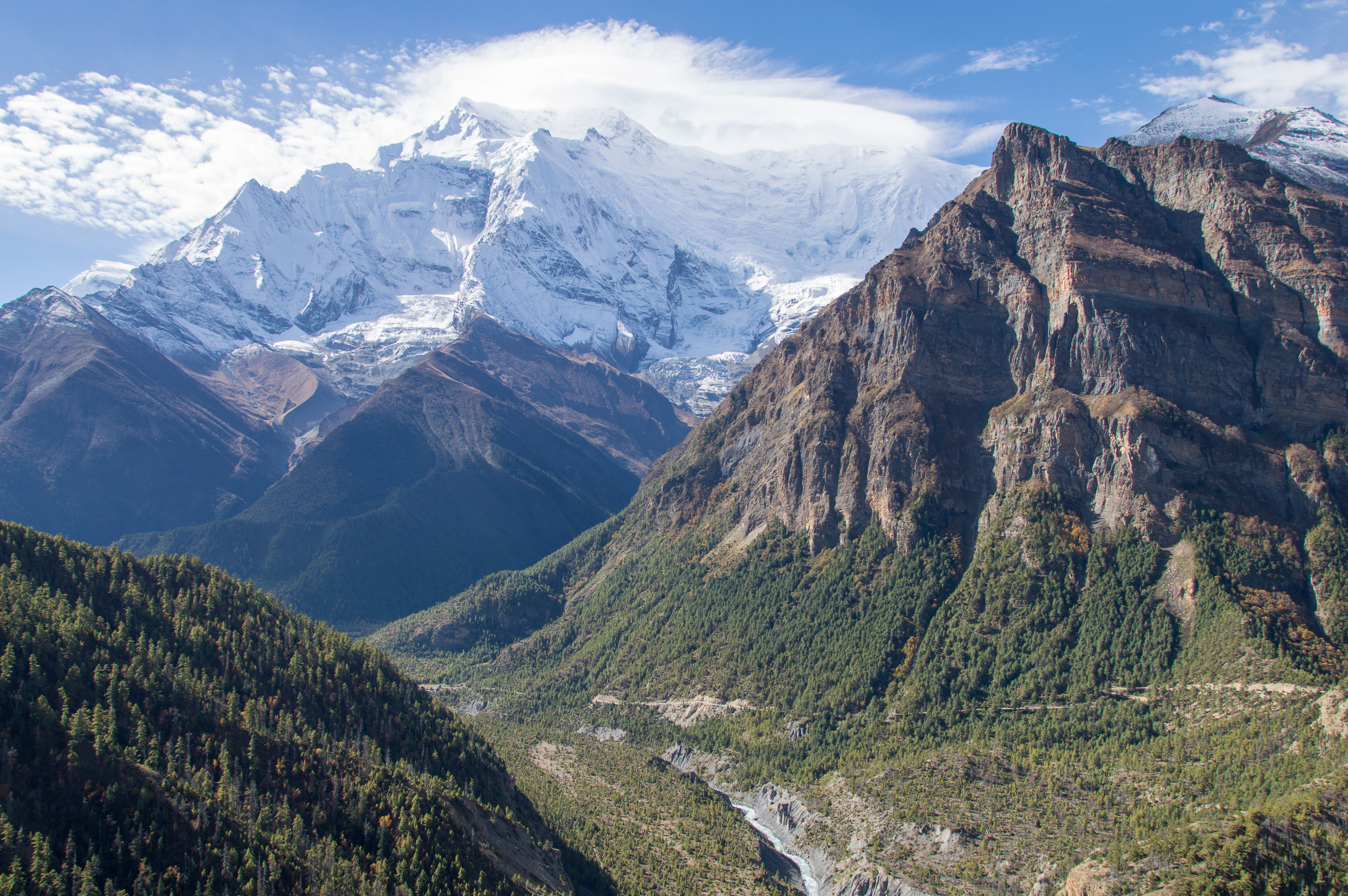
Marsyangdi valley with Annapurna II

Climate Zone	Elevation Range	% of Area
Subtropical	1,000 to 2,000 meters 3,300 to 6,600 ft.	0.3%
Temperate	2,000 to 3,000 meters 6,400 to 9,800 ft.	3.7%
Subalpine	3,000 to 4,000 meters 9,800 to 13,100 ft.	14.6%
Alpine	4,000 to 5,000 meters 13,100 to 16,400 ft.	13.9%
Nival	above 5,000 meters	25.4%
Trans-Himalayan	3,000 to 6,400 meters 9,800 to 21,000 ft.	42.1%

== Demographics ==
Historical population
Census year	Pop.	±% p.a.
1981	7,021	—
1991	5,363	−2.66%
2001	9,587	+5.98%
2011	6,538	−3.76%
2021	5,658	−1.44%
Source: Citypopulation

At the time of the 2021 Nepal census, Manang District had a population of 5,658. 4.93% of the population is under 5 years of age. It has a literacy rate of 78.36% and a sex ratio of 773 females per 1000 males. The entire population lives in rural areas.

Castes/ethnic groups in Manang district (2021)
1. Gurung (46.0%)
2. Bhote (6.57%)
3. Ghale (5.97%)
4. Chhetri (5.36%)
5. Kami (5.05%)
6. Magar (4.65%)
7. Bahun (4.10%)
8. Tamang (4.05%)
9. Newar (1.57%)
10. Damai (1.17%)
11. Rai (0.90%)
12. Other Hill Janjati (2.17%)
13. Others (12.5%)

Hill Janjatis make up 70% of the population, while Others make up 10% of the population. Khas people make up 17% of the population.

Languages of Manang district (2021)
1. Gurung (34.2%)
2. Nepali (24.2%)
3. Manange (16.4%)
4. Nar Phu (7.09%)
5. Tibetan (5.21%)
6. Tamang (3.15%)
7. Magar (2.23%)
8. Ghale (2.03%)
9. Others (5.34%)

At the time of the 2021 census, 34.25% of the population spoke Gurung, 24.25% Nepali, 16.45% Manange, 7.09% Nar Phu, 5.21% Tibetan, 3.15% Tamang, 2.23% Magar and 2.03% Ghale as their first language. In 2011, 16.3% of the population spoke Nepali as their first language.

Religion in Manang District (2021)
Religion	Percent
Buddhism	50.60%
Hinduism	40.69%
Bon	6.13%
Christianity	2.37%
Other or not stated	0.21%

== Administration ==
The district consists of four rural municipalities:

- Chame
- Nason Rural Municipality
- Narpa Bhumi Rural Municipality
- Manang Ngisyang Rural Municipality

=== Former municipalities and village development committees ===
Prior to the restructuring of the district, Manang District consisted of the following municipalities and village development committees:

- Bhakra
- Chame
- Dharapani
- Ghyaru
- Khangsar
- Manang
- Nar
- Ngawal
- Phu
- Pisang
- Tachi Bagarchhap
- Tanki Manang
- Thoche

== See also ==
- Zones of Nepal (Former)
