= Majibari =

Majibari माझीबारी
- Village
- Location in Nepal Majibari (Nepal)
- Coordinates: 28.26°N 84.62°E
- Country: Nepal
- Zone: Gandaki Zone
- District: Lamjung District
- Time zone: UTC+5:45 (Nepal Time)

Majibari is a small village in Dudhpokhari VDC, in the east Lamjung.

The village is made up of 20 households and has a tiny population of 178 people.

Majibari village in east Lamjung

== People ==
Although the whole village is made up of small population, Bhattarai, Dhital and Tamang are the major ethnic group.

== Education ==
With no educational institute except a primary school and a mid-school in the Bichaur VDC, the village has a high literacy. According to 2011 Nepal census the village has a literacy rate of 96%. All youth leaves to the city after they graduate from mid-school for higher studies.

== Health ==
There are no health facilities in the village.

== Transportation ==
In the year 2011 the village was connected with a graveled road along with Gorkha district. Thus, the transportation is very poor as landslide and soil erosion disrupts the only access during monsoon and heavy rainfall.

GoogleEarth image of Majibari.

== 2015 Nepal Earthquake ==
The village was affected by the earthquake on 25 April 2015. It along with Ilampokhari, Gauda, Kolki and Pyarjung were the most affected villages in Lamjung district. Although there was no loss of life during the quake all houses were reported to be demolished.
