= Kwhlosothar Rural Municipality =

Kwholasothar क्व्होलासोथार
- Gaupalika
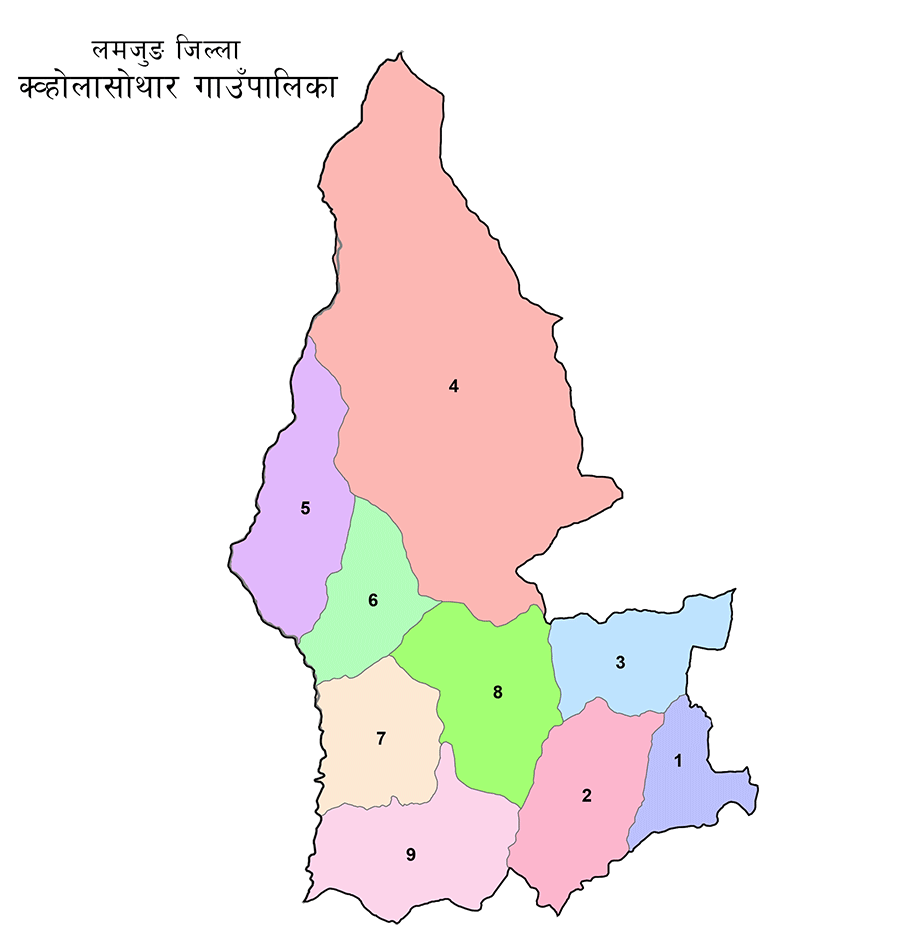
- Wards of Kwholasothar

- Location in Nepal Kwholasothar (Nepal)
- Coordinates (Maling): 28.23°N 84.29°E
- Country: Nepal
- Province: Gandaki Province
- District: Lamjung District
- Established: 12th March, 2017

Area
  - Total: 175.35 km^{2} (67.70 sq mi)

Population (2011 Nepal census)
  - Total: 10,032
  - Density: 57.211/km^{2} (148.18/sq mi)
- Time zone: UTC+5:45 (Nepal Time)
- Area code: +977-52
- HQ: Office of Maling
- Website: kwholasotharmun.gov.np

Kwholasothar (Nepali: क्व्होलासोथार) is a rural municipality located in the Lamjung District of Gandaki Province, central Nepal. It was formed on 10 March 2017 as part of the new local administrative structure, which comprises 744 local units. Kwholasothar, a local municipal unit in Lamjung is created by merging wards 1, 2, 5, 6 of Balungpani, Maling, Uttarkanya, Bhujung, Pasagaun, Bhoje, and Gilung. The municipality has a total population of 10,032 and covers an area of 175.37 km^{2}. It is divided into 9 wards, with the administrative center situated in the former Maling V.D.C. Kwholasothar is bordered by Besisahar Municipality and Marsyandi Rural Municipality to the east, Kaski District to the west, and Marsyandi Rural Municipality, Kaski District, Madhyanepal Municipality, and Besishahar Municipality to the north and south, respectively.
