= Dordi Rural Municipality =

Municipality in Lamjung District, Nepal

Dordi Rural Municipality is one of the local level rural municipalities of Lamjung District, of its 8 local municipalities. Dordi Rural Municipality was declared by incorporating the wards (1-8) of the former Hilletksar, Bharte, Archalbot, Shreebhanjyang, Nauthar, Pachok, Dhodeni, Faleni and Bansar Village Development Committees in Lamjung district.

It has 9 wards and according to census 2021, 16,050 people live in here.

It has 350.93 square km area.

Its center is in the office of the previous Nauthar V.D.C.

- Gorkha District and Dudhpokhari Rural Municipality are in the east.
- Marsyandi Rural Municipality and Besisahar Municipality are in the west.
- Marsyandi Rural Municipality and Gorkha District are in the north.
- Sundarbazar Municipality, Rainas Municipality, and Dudhpokhari Rural Municipality are in the south.

== History ==
Previous Bharte V.D.C. (all wards), previous Archalbot V.D.C. (all wards), previous Shree Manjang V.D.C. (all wards), previous Nauthar V.D.C. (all wards), previous Pachowk V.D.C. (all wards), previous Dhodeni V.D.C. (all wards), previous Faleni V.D.C. (all wards), previous Bansar V.D.C. (all wards) and previous Hiletaksar V.D.C. (1, 2, 3, 4, 5, 6, 7 & 8 wards) are included in this newly made rural municipality.
