= Dudhpokhari Rural Municipality =

Dudhpokhari Rural Municipality is one of the local levels of Lamjung District out of 8 local levels. It has 6 wards and according to census 2021, 8,592 people live in here. It has 153.33 square km area. Its center is in the office of previous Gauda V.D.C. Gorkha District is in the east, Dordi Rural Municipality is in the west and the north and Rainas Municipality and Gorkha District are in the south of Dudhpokhari Rural Municipality. Previous Dudhpokhari V.D.C. (all wards), previous Bichaur V.D.C. (all wards), previous Ilampokhari V.D.C. (all wards), previous Kolki V.D.C. (all wards) and previous Gauda V.D.C (all wards) are included in this newly made municipality.
