= Karaputar =

Karaputar करापुटार नगरपालिका
- Municipality
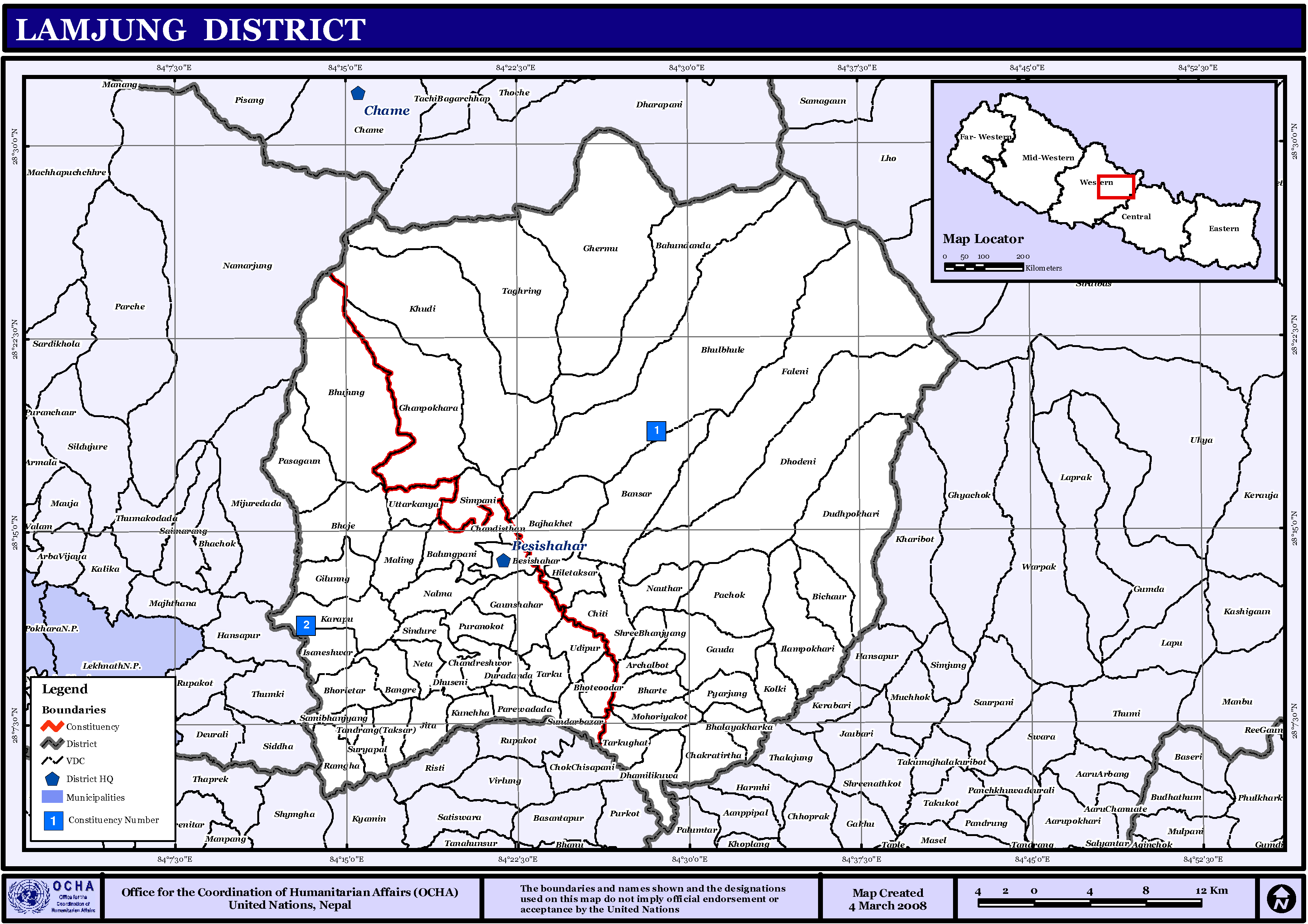

- Location in Nepal Karaputar (Nepal)
- Coordinates: 28.20°N 84.24°E
- Country: Nepal
- Province: Gandaki
- District: Lamjung District

Population (2011)
  - Total: 10,836
- Time zone: UTC+5:45 (NST)
- Area code: 066

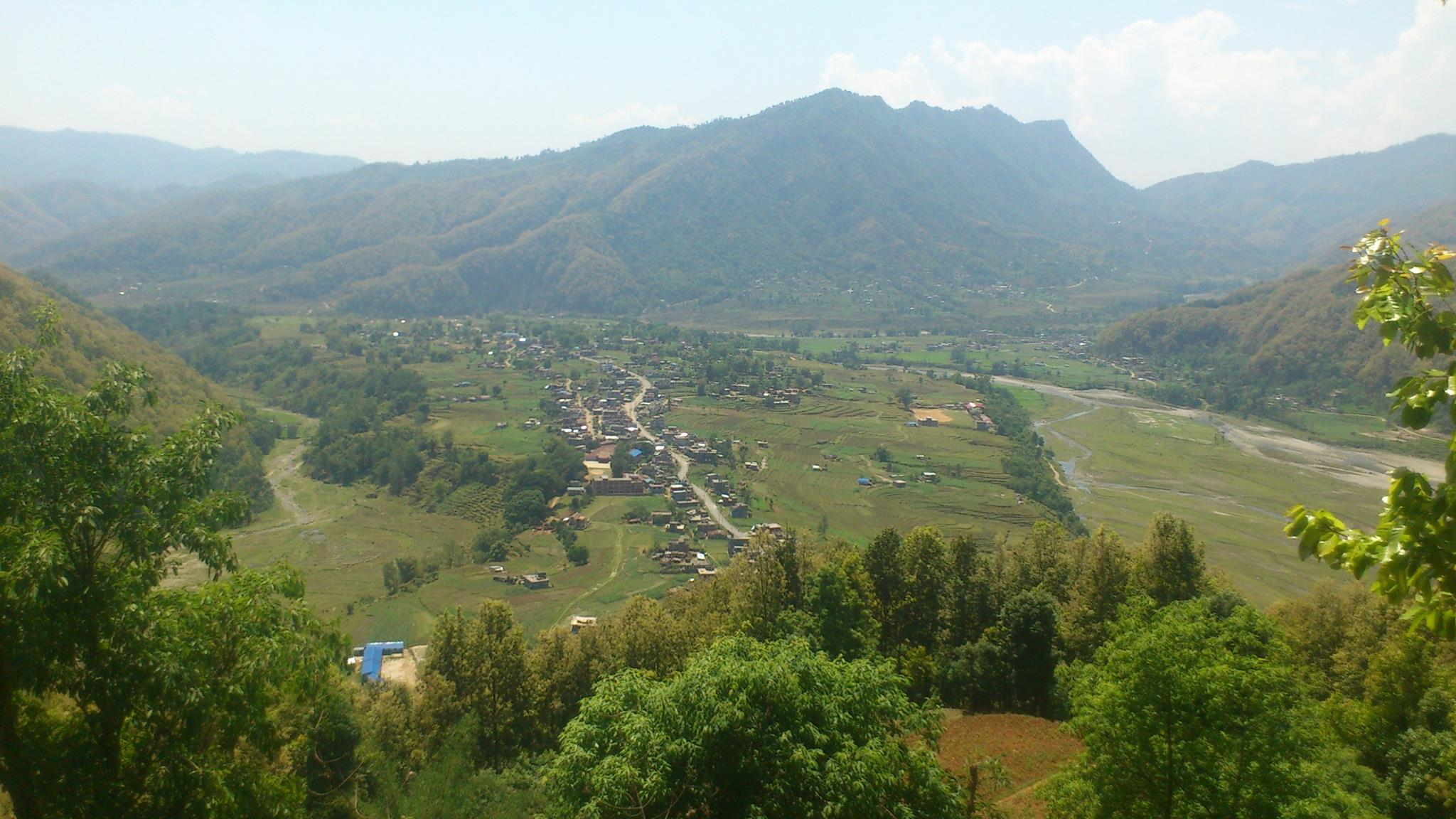
Bhorletar in Karapurtar Municipality

Karaputar was a municipality of Lamjung District in Gandaki Province of central Nepal. The municipality was established on 19 September 2015 by merging the existing Bangre, Bhorletar, Isaneshwor and Karapu village development committees (VDCs). The center of the municipality was established in the former VDC Office of Karapu Bazaar. After merging the four VDC's population it had a total population of 10,836 according to 2011 Nepal census. After the government decision the number of municipalities has reached 217 in Nepal. This municipality finally merged with Madhyanepal municipality on 10 March 2017. Madhyanepal established the same day with part of Karaputar municipality.

== Municipality ==
The Government announced additional 26 municipalities. With this announcement Karaputar has been upgraded as one of the municipalities of Nepal, previously it was proposed municipality. Adjoining Bangre, Bhorletar, Isaneshwor and Karapu VDC was merged with Karaputar to upgrade it to the municipality. Karaputar is also a destination for thousands of Hindu pilgrim every year on Shiv Ratri.
