= Marsyangdi Rural Municipality =

Coordinates: 28.29°N 84.372°E

Marsyandi Rural Municipality is one of eight municipalities in Lamjung District, Nepal. It has 9 wards and, according to the 2011 census, a population of 18,759 people. The municipality is 597.25 km^{2} (230.60 sq mi) in area, and its administrative center is in the office of the previous Bhulbhule V.D.C. Gorkha District and Dordi Rural Municipality are to the east, Kwhlosothar Rural Municipality and Kaski District are to the west, Manang District, Kaski District and Gorkha District are in the north, and Besisahar Municipality, Dordi Rural Municipality and Kwhlosothar Rural Municipality are to the south of Marsyandi Rural Municipality. Previous portions of Ghanpokhara V.D.C. (all wards), Khudi V.D.C. (all wards), Taghring V.D.C. (all wards), Ghermu V.D.C. (all wards), Bahundanda V.D.C (all wards), Bhulbhule V.D.C (all wards) and Simpani V.D.C.(all wards) are included in this newly made rural municipality.
