= Borang =

Borang (Nepali: बोराङ) is a village in Rainas Municipality, Lamjung District, Gandaki Province, Nepal. It was formerly part of Pyarjung Village Development Committee (VDC) before Nepal's local-level restructuring.

Following Nepal's local-level restructuring, the former Pyarjung VDC was incorporated into Rainas Municipality. Rainas Municipality was formed through the merger of several former VDCs, including Pyarjung.

== Geography ==
Borang is located in the mid-hill region of Lamjung District. The surrounding area includes rural settlements, terraced farmland, forests and traditional hill landscapes.

== Administration ==
Historically, Borang was administered under Pyarjung Village Development Committee, a former local administrative unit of Nepal. Following the implementation of Nepal's federal system of governance, the area became part of Rainas Municipality.

Borang is located within Ward No. 10 of Rainas Municipality.
