= Tinpiple, Lamjung =

Tinpiple, Chakratirtha तीनपिप्ले
- Municipality
- Location in Nepal Tinpiple, Chakratirtha (Nepal)
- Coordinates: 28.11°N 84.52°E
- Country: Nepal
- Zone: Gandaki Zone
- District: Lamjung District

Population (2011)
  - Total: Approx. 3,000
- Time zone: UTC+5:45 (Nepal Time)

Tinpiple is situated near the Chepe River. The Chepe River is the borderline between the Gorkha and Lamjung districts and originates in Dudhpokhari. The river has a long historical background and is seen as a sign of love and affection as well as the barrier to brotherhood.

Tinpiple is situated in the Rainas Municipality of the Lamjung District of Nepal. It is an agricultural village with a high potential for agricultural product. This village is the residence for hundreds of ethnic groups and other diversified communities.

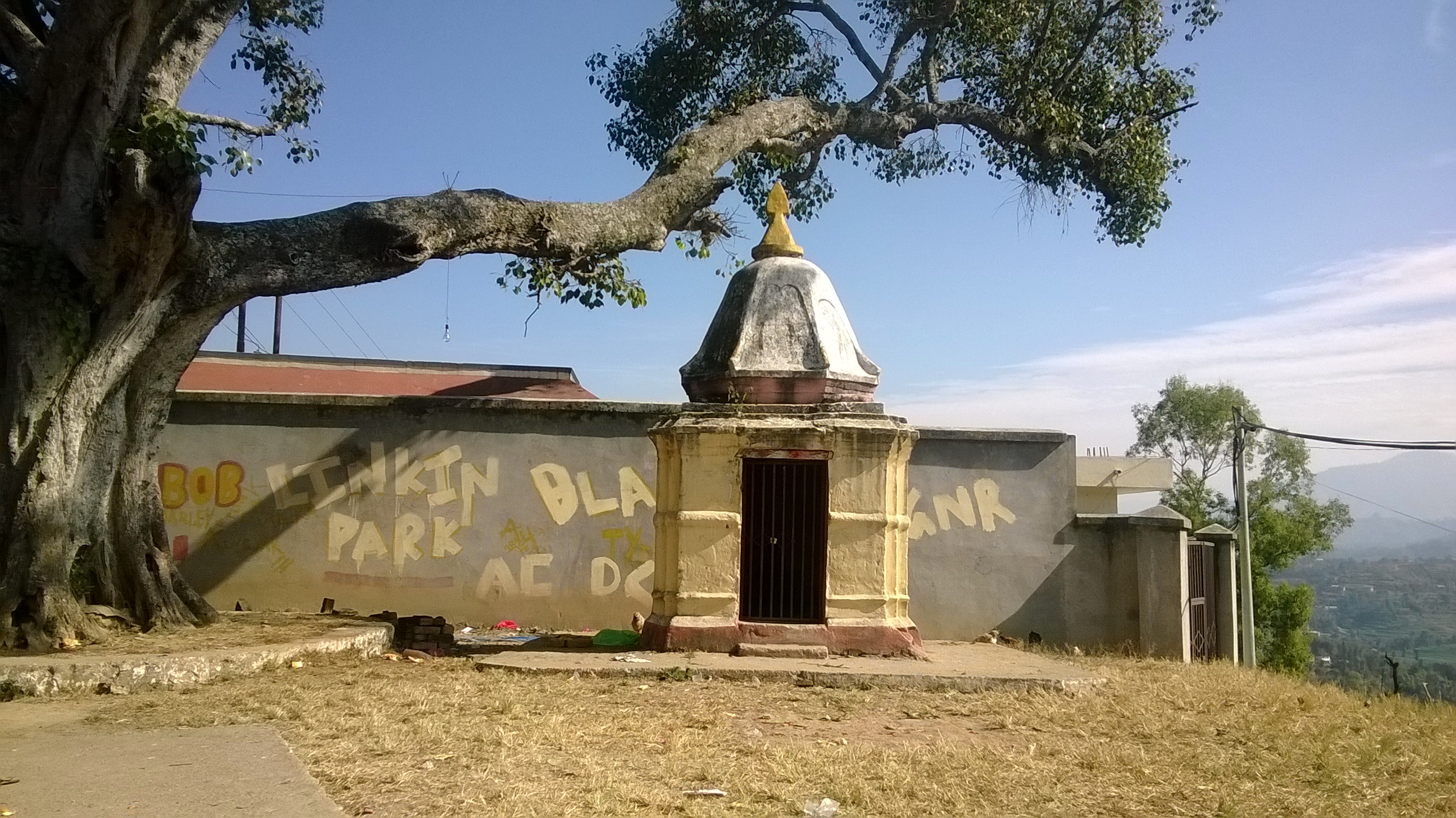
Krishna mandir in Tinpiple

Tinpiple is also a trekking pathway to high mountain trekking of the Annapurna Circuit, as a peak of 4700m is located in the same district. Tinpiple is related to the history of Nepal and the Nepalese from the time when Nepal was divided into more than forty-five Kingdoms. Dudhpokhari is the symbolic lake of peace in Nepali history which had played vital role to stop a fight between two brothers, the kings of Lamjung and Gorkha.
