= Rainas =

Rainas राइनास नगरपालिका
- Municipality
- Nickname: rainas
- Location in Nepal Rainas (Nepal)
- Coordinates: 28.48°N 84.28°E
- Country: Nepal
- Province: Gandaki
- District: Lamjung
- No. of wards: 10
- Established: 19 September 2015

Government
  - Type: Mayor-council
  - Mayor: Mr. Sing Bahadur Thapa
  - Deputy Mayor: Mrs. Dhan Kumari Gurung

Area
  - Total: 71.97 km^{2} (27.79 sq mi)

Population (2011)
  - Total: 18,527
  - Density: 257.4/km^{2} (666.7/sq mi)
- Time zone: UTC+5:45 (NST)
- Postal code: 33608
- Area code: 066
- Website: rainasmun.gov.np

Rainas (Nepali: राइनास) is a municipality of Lamjung District in Gandaki Province of central Nepal. The municipality was declared on 19 September 2015 by merging the existing six VDCs of Eastern Lamjung, Tarkughat, Dhamilikuwa, Chakratirtha, Bhalayakharka, Pyarjung and Mohoriyakot having a total of 73 square km area. Tinpiple, in the former Chakratirth VDC, serves as the centre/headquarter of the municipality. Rainas has a total population of 18,527 and population density of 254 person/km^{2}, according to 2011 Nepal census.

It is named after the historic Rainaskot which was the major strategic fort of the then Lamjung State, a popular and powerful state among the contemporary states of Nepal. Rainas Region consists of many castes braman, chetri, gurung, tamang, bc, etc. (now: Rainas Municipality) has a direct contribution in the foundation of modern Nepal. Bhakti Thapa, the administrator of Rainas region in the early 1800s showed his bravery in defending Nepal from British imperialism. Hence, the identity of Rainas has been dignified in the glorious history of Nepal. Some famous places include Tinpiple and Satbise.

== Municipality ==
The Government's announcement of additional 26 new municipalities has totaled 217 municipalities in the country. With this announcement Rainas has been upgraded as one of the municipalities of Nepal, previously it was proposed municipality. Adjoining Tarkughat, Dhamilikuwa, Chakratirtha, Bhalayakharka, Pyarjung and Mohoriyakot VDC were merged with Rainas to upgrade it to the municipality.
