= Chandreshwar =

Chandreshwar चण्डेश्वर
- Village development committee
- Location in Nepal Chandreshwar (Nepal)
- Coordinates: 28.17°N 84.35°E
- Country: Nepal
- Zone: Gandaki Zone
- District: Lamjung District

Population (1991)
  - Total: 2,357
- Time zone: UTC+5:45 (Nepal Time)

Chandreshwar is a village development committee in Lamjung District in the Gandaki Zone of northern-central Nepal. At the time of the 1991 Nepal census it had a population of 2357 people living in 488 individual households.
