= Dhital =

Family name

Dhital(धिताल in Devnagari) is a surname of people belonging to the Brahmin and chhetri from Nepal.Dhital belong to the Kaushik gotra(apart from few exception). Dhital's origin is most likely from Gorkha District, a western district of Nepal, but people with her surname are now scattered all over the country, including in Dhading, Lamjung, Gorkha, Kalikot, Dang, Bara, Hetauda, Nawalparasi, Kathmandu, Nuwakot, Kavrepalanchok, Sindhupalchowk and Rupandehi.

== Origin ==
The Surname Dhital origanted from Dhita of Sinja valley sometime between late 16 century to early 17 century.

== Gotra ==
Most of People with Dhital Surname recognize themselves as Kaushik , the descendants of the Brahmarishi Vishvamitra.But few Dhitals from a few villages of Dang recognize themselves as Gautam descendents of Gautam Rishi.Dhitals Worship Eight Masta including Bala masto, and Bindabashani as their clan deity during their Kul puja various other Pujas.

== Meaning ==
There is no known meaning of the word 'dhital' in Nepali or Sanskrit. But a number of explanations exists.

The most common explanation involves breaking down the word Dhital into Dhi and Tal.

The Word Dhi (धि in devnagari) has a lot of meanings in Sanskrit and ancient texts across southasia. Some of the relevant meanings include: To hold, have, possess, a receptacle store, reservoir, knowledge, science, intellect, or understanding; in Tibetan Buddhism Dhī (धी) refers to a “wise man”, in different texts of Ayurveda Dhī (धी) refers to wit. The last word Tal (ताल) is commonly understood as Lake or rhythm.

Thus a number of meaning can be drawn by combining these two:

1. sea or lake of knowledge
2. excellent musician
3. one having excellent rhythm

But a number of other explanations of its meaning, or origin, exists.

1. Nepali word dhito loosely translate to something relating to finance. So the first person with Dhital surname was probably called as Dhito wal (person responsible for the financial matter of the Khas kingdom of jumla). As the time passed the word Dhitowal became Dhital.
2. Dhita or Dhtalihi is a village in Sinja Valley Jumla. So, Dhital may have been originated from Dhita and -aal (the devnagri word अलय means 'somebody who lived or has home in Dhita').

== Population and distribution ==
The exact population is not known but is estimated around 25,000 around the world. The Book "Dhital Vansawali" published in 2060 B.S. by Dhital Sewa Samaj have published the family tree of most of Dhitals.

== Notable people with the name ==
- Kumud Dhital, cardiothoracic specialist and transplant surgeon in Australia
- Shreya Dhital (born 1995), Nepalese swimmer
