= Bhote Bazar =

BhoteWodar
- Village development committee
- Location in Nepal BhoteWodar (Nepal)
- Country: Nepal
- Zone: Gandaki Zone
- District: Lamjung District

Population (1991)
  - Total: 3,630
- Time zone: UTC+5:45 (Nepal Time)

Bhotewodar is a village development committee in Lamjung District in the Gandaki Zone of northern-central Nepal. At the time of the 1991 Nepal census it had a population of 3630 people living in 785 individual households.
