= Samibhanjyang =

Samibhanjyang सामिभञ्ज्याङ
- Village development committee (Madhyanepal Municipality ward 5 )
- Location in Nepal Samibhanjyang (Nepal)
- Coordinates: 28.13°N 84.24°E
- Country: Nepal
- Zone: Gandaki Zone Gandaki Province
- District: Lamjung District

Population (2021)
  - Total: 866
- Time zone: UTC+5:45 (Nepal Time)

Samibhanjyang is a village development committee in Lamjung District in the Gandaki Zone of northern-central Nepal. At the time of the 2021 Nepal census it had a population of 866 people living in 270 individual households.
