= Parewadanda =

Parewadanda परेवाडाँडा
- Village development committee
- Location in Nepal Parewadanda (Nepal)
- Coordinates: 28.14°N 84.38°E
- Country: Nepal
- Zone: Gandaki Zone
- District: Lamjung District

Population (1991)
  - Total: 2,633
- Time zone: UTC+5:45 (Nepal Time)

Parewadanda is a village development committee in Lamjung District in the Gandaki Zone of northern-central Nepal. At the time of the 1991 Nepal census it had a population of 2633 people living in 528 individual households.

The major castes of the VDC are mainly Brahmins, Chhetris, Kamis, and Kumals. Major goddesses are Jibjibe Kalika and Manakamana.
