= Ghanpokhara =

Ghanpokhara घनपोखरा
- Village development committee
- Location in Nepal Ghanpokhara (Nepal)
- Coordinates: 28.33°N 84.31°E
- Country: Nepal
- Zone: Gandaki Zone
- District: Lamjung District

Population (1991)
  - Total: 3,168
- Time zone: UTC+5:45 (Nepal Time)

Ghanpokhara is a village development committee in Lamjung District in the Gandaki Zone of northern-central Nepal. In 1991, it had a population of 3168 living in 597 individual households. It lies 1.6 kilometres (0.99 mi) north of the tourist destination Ghalegaun.
