= Bhotewodar =

Bhotewodar भोटेओडार
- City
- Location in Nepal Bhotewodar (Nepal)
- Coordinates: 28°13′52″N 84°22′39″E
- Country: Nepal
- Province: Gandaki Province
- District: Lamjung District
- Elevation: 760 m (2,490 ft)

Population (2001)
  - Total: 5,897
- Time zone: UTC+5:45 (Nepal Time)
- Postal code: 33600
- Area code: 066

Bhotewodar, one of the main cities of Lamjung District. Which is identified as the gateway of East Lamjung lies in the Gandaki zone, Nepal. It was named as Bhotewodar as there was a cave (odhar) in this place where Bhotes used to take shelter during the winter time and used to sell their goods. So, it was named as Bhotewodar later. It has three government schools and three private boarding schools. Bhakti Namuna Secondary School was established in 2024 B.S. Students can get education up to diploma level herein. It has got all kind of facilities like electricity, transportation, communication, health and so on. The climate is very fine to settle and lies near the Marsyangdi river. It has Middle Marsyangdi Hydropower House. Newars are the first inhabitants of this place. Later on people from Gurung community, Brahmin community, Chhetri community also have settled here. At the time of the 2001 Nepal census it had a population of 5897.

== See also ==
- Lamjung District
