= Rangha =

Coordinates: 28°05′N 84°14′E

Ramgha रम्घा मध्य नेपाल
- Village development committee
- Location in Nepal Ramgha (Nepal)
- Country: Nepal
- Zone: Gandaki Zone
- District: Lamjung District

Population (1991)
  - Total: 2,327
- Time zone: UTC+5:45 (Nepal Time)

Ramgha is a former village development committee now changed into MadhyaNepal Municipality in Lamjung District in the Gandaki Zone of northern-central Nepal. According to Geologist Dr.Harka Gurung this area lies in the centroid of Nepal.At the time of the 1991 Nepal census it had a population of 2327 people living in 446 individual households.
