= Bahundanda =

Bahundanda बाहुनडाँडा
- Village development committee
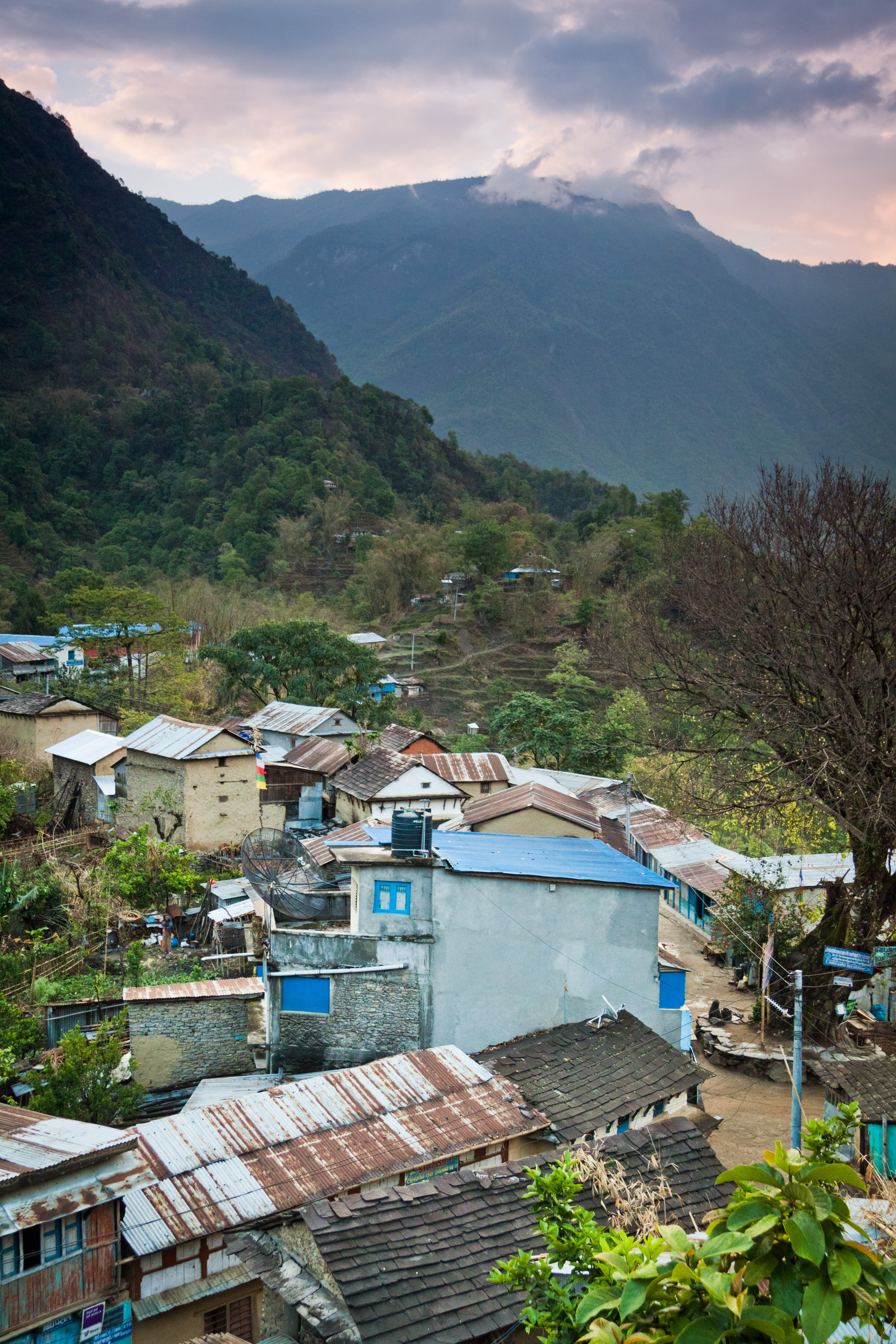
- Bahundanda in the morning

- Location in Nepal Bahundanda (Nepal)
- Coordinates: 28.343°N 84.406°E
- Country: Nepal
- Zone: Gandaki Zone
- District: Lamjung District

Government
  - Type: none

Population (1991)
  - Total: 2,114
- Time zone: UTC+5:45 (Nepal Time)

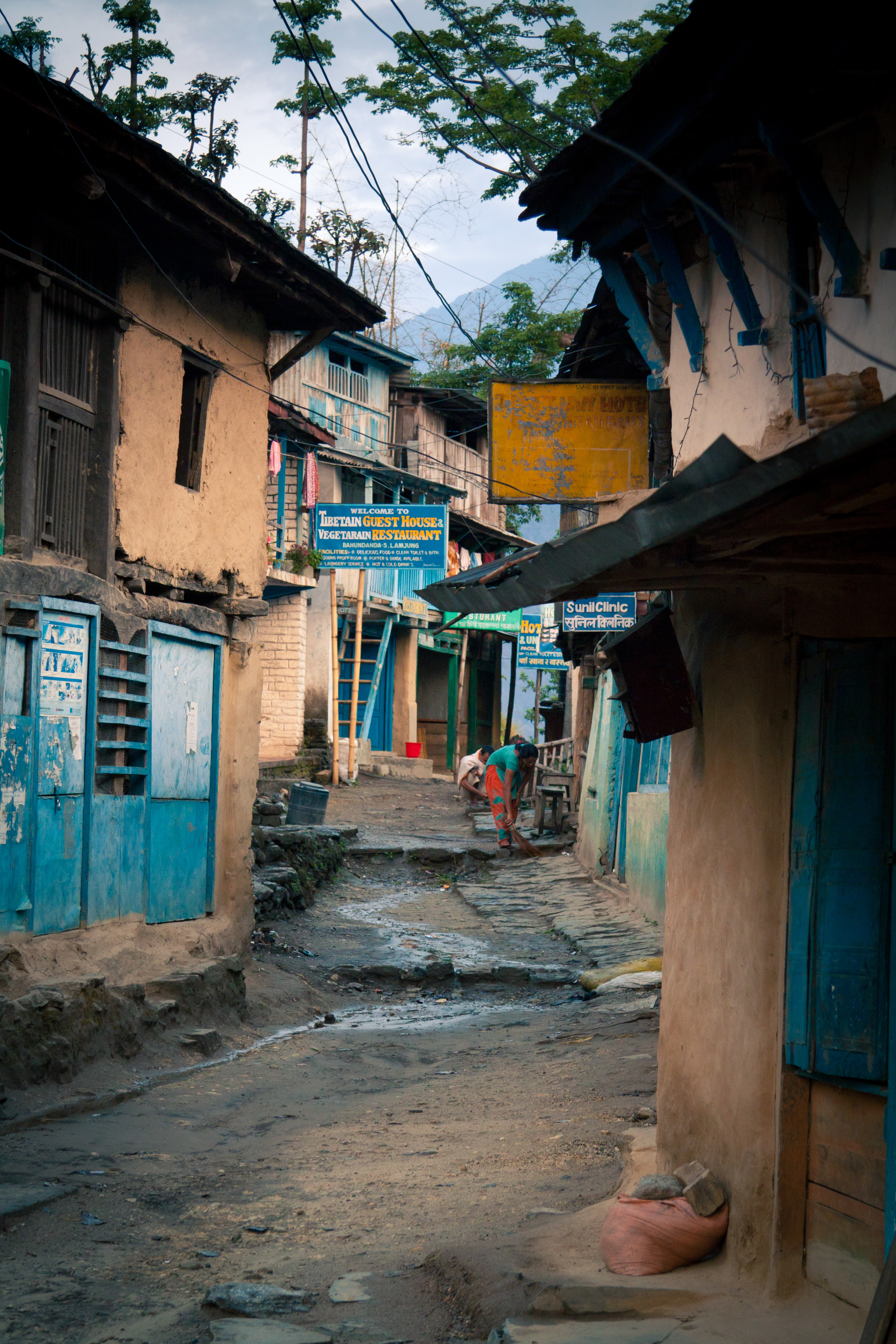

Bahundanda is a village development committee in Lamjung District in the Gandaki Zone of northern-central Nepal. At the time of the 1991 Nepal census it had a population of 2114 people living in 433 individual households.
