= Simpani =

Simpani may refer to:

- Simpani, Gandaki, Nepal
- Simpani, Sagarmatha, Nepal
