= Sindure =

Sindure सिन्दुरे
- Village development committee
- Motto: SINDURE DHUNGA.jpg
- Location in Nepal Sindure (Nepal)
- Coordinates: 28.19°N 84.31°E
- Country: Nepal
- Zone: Gandaki Zone
- District: Lamjung District

Population (1991)
  - Total: 1,822
- Time zone: UTC+5:45 (Nepal Time)

Sindure is a village development committee in Lamjung District in the Gandaki Zone of northern-central Nepal. At the time of the 1991 Nepal census it had a population of 1822 people living in 336 individual households.
