= Pachok =

Pachok पाचोक
- Village development committee
- Location in Nepal Pachok (Nepal)
- Coordinates: 28.21°N 84.53°E
- Country: Nepal
- Zone: Gandaki Zone
- District: Lamjung District

Population (1991)
  - Total: 2,690
- Time zone: UTC+5:45 (Nepal Time)

Pachok is a village development committee in Lamjung District in the Gandaki Zone of northern-central Nepal. At the time of the 1991 Nepal census it had a population of 2690 people living in 509 individual households.
