= Suryapal =

Suryapal सूर्यपाल
- Village development committee
- Location in Nepal Suryapal (Nepal)
- Coordinates: 28.11°N 84.27°E
- Country: Nepal
- Zone: Gandaki Zone
- District: Lamjung District

Population (1991)
  - Total: 1,655
- Time zone: UTC+5:45 (Nepal Time)

Suryapal is a village development committee in Lamjung District in the Gandaki Zone of northern-central Nepal. At the time of the 1991 Nepal census it had a population of 1655 people living in 332 individual households.
