= Kunchha =

Kunchha कुन्छा
- Village development committee
- Location in Nepal Kunchha (Nepal)
- Coordinates: 28.14°N 84.34°E
- Country: Nepal
- Zone: Gandaki Zone
- District: Lamjung District

Population (1991)
  - Total: 2,454
- Time zone: UTC+5:45 (Nepal Time)
- Postal Code: 33605
- Area code: 066

Kunchha is a village development committee in Lamjung District in the Gandaki Zone of northern-central Nepal. At the time of the 1991 Nepal census it had a population of 2454 people living in 503 individual households.
