= Sri Bhanjyang =

Shree Manjang श्रीमञ्जाङ्ग
- Village development committee
- Location in Nepal Shree Manjang (Nepal)
- Coordinates: 28.19°N 84.47°E
- Country: Nepal
- Zone: Gandaki Zone
- District: Lamjung District

Population (1991)
  - Total: 2,080
- Time zone: UTC+5:45 (Nepal Time)

Shree Manjang is a village development committee in Lamjung District in the Gandaki Zone of northern-central Nepal. At the time of the 1991 Nepal census it had a population of 2080 people living in 409 individual households.
