= Bhujung =

Bhujung भुजुङ
- Village development committee
- Location in Nepal Bhujung (Nepal)
- Coordinates: 28.31°N 84.26°E
- Country: Nepal
- Province: Gandaki Province
- District: Lamjung District

Population (1991)
  - Total: 1,621
- Time zone: UTC+5:45 (Nepal Time)

Bhujung is a village development committee in Lamjung District in the Gandaki Province of northern-central Nepal. At the time of the 1991 Nepal census it had a population of 1621 people living in 339 individual households.
