= Archalbot =

Archalbot अर्चलबोट
- Village development committee
- Location in Nepal
- Coordinates: 28°14′4″N 83°58′59″E
- Country: Nepal
- Zone: Gandaki Zone
- District: Lamjung District

Population (2011)
  - Total: 4,765
- Time zone: UTC+5:45 (Nepal Time)
- Area code: 066

Archalbot is a village development committee in Lamjung District in the Gandaki Zone of northern-central Nepal. At the time of the 1991 Nepal census it had a population of 1650 people living in 333 individual households.

The paddy fields for rice farming and the terraces are a characteristic of the village area. Nearby is the Tamang community of Phurano Dobar, which was recently installed with a clean water system. Surrounding the VDC are rhododendron forests, which give view to the Himalayan peaks from the Annapurnas in the west to Manaslu to the Langtang area in the east.
