= Bhulbhule =

Bhulbhule भुल्भुले sagar village
- Village development committee
- Location in Nepal Bhulbhule (Nepal)
- Coordinates: 28.290°N 84.372°E
- Country: Nepal
- Zone: Gandaki Zone
- District: Lamjung District
- Elevation: 840 m (2,760 ft)

Population (1991)
  - Total: 3,079
- Time zone: UTC+5:45 (Nepal Time)

Bhulbhule is a village development committee in Lamjung District in the Gandaki Zone of northern-central Nepal. At the time of the 1991 Nepal census, it had a population of 3,079 people living in 626 individual households.
