= Dhamilikuwa =

Dhamilikuwa धमिलीकुवा
- Village development committee
- Nickname: rainas 6
- Location in Nepal Dhamilikuwa (Nepal)
- Coordinates: 28.09°N 84.47°E
- Country: Nepal
- Zone: Gandaki Zone
- District: Lamjung District

Population (1991)
  - Total: 3,831
- Time zone: UTC+5:45 (Nepal Time)

Dhamilikuwa is a village development committee in Lamjung District in the Gandaki Zone of northern-central Nepal. At the time of the 1991 Nepal census it had a population of 3831 people living in 791 individual households.
