= Madhyanepal =

Madhyanepal मध्यनेपाल नगरपालिका
- Municipality
- Location in Gandaki Madhyanepal (Nepal)
- Coordinates: 28.5°N 84.14°E
- Country: Nepal
- Province: Gandaki
- District: Lamjung District
- No. Of wards: 10
- Reestablished: 10 March 2017

Government
  - Type: Mayor-council
  - Mayor: Mr. Ramesh Kumar Pandey
  - Deputy Mayor: Mrs. Sita Gurung

Area
  - Total: 113.86 km^{2} (43.96 sq mi)

Population (2011)
  - Total: 23,385
  - Density: 205.38/km^{2} (531.94/sq mi)
- Time zone: UTC+5:45 (NST)
- Area code: 066
- Website: madhyanepalmun.gov.np

Madhyanepal (Nepali: मध्यनेपाल) is a municipality located in Lamjung District in Gandaki Province of Nepal. It is one of four municipalities located in Lamjung.

Madhyanepal reestablished on 10 March 2017 renaming the former Karaputar municipality merging with Neta VDC. The former Karaputar municipality was established in 2015, declaring Karapu Bazar the admin center.

Total area of the municipality is 113.86 square kilometres (43.96 sq mi) and the population according to the 2011 Nepal census is 23,385. The municipality is divided into 10 wards.
