= Ghermu =

Ghermu घेर्मु
- Village development committee
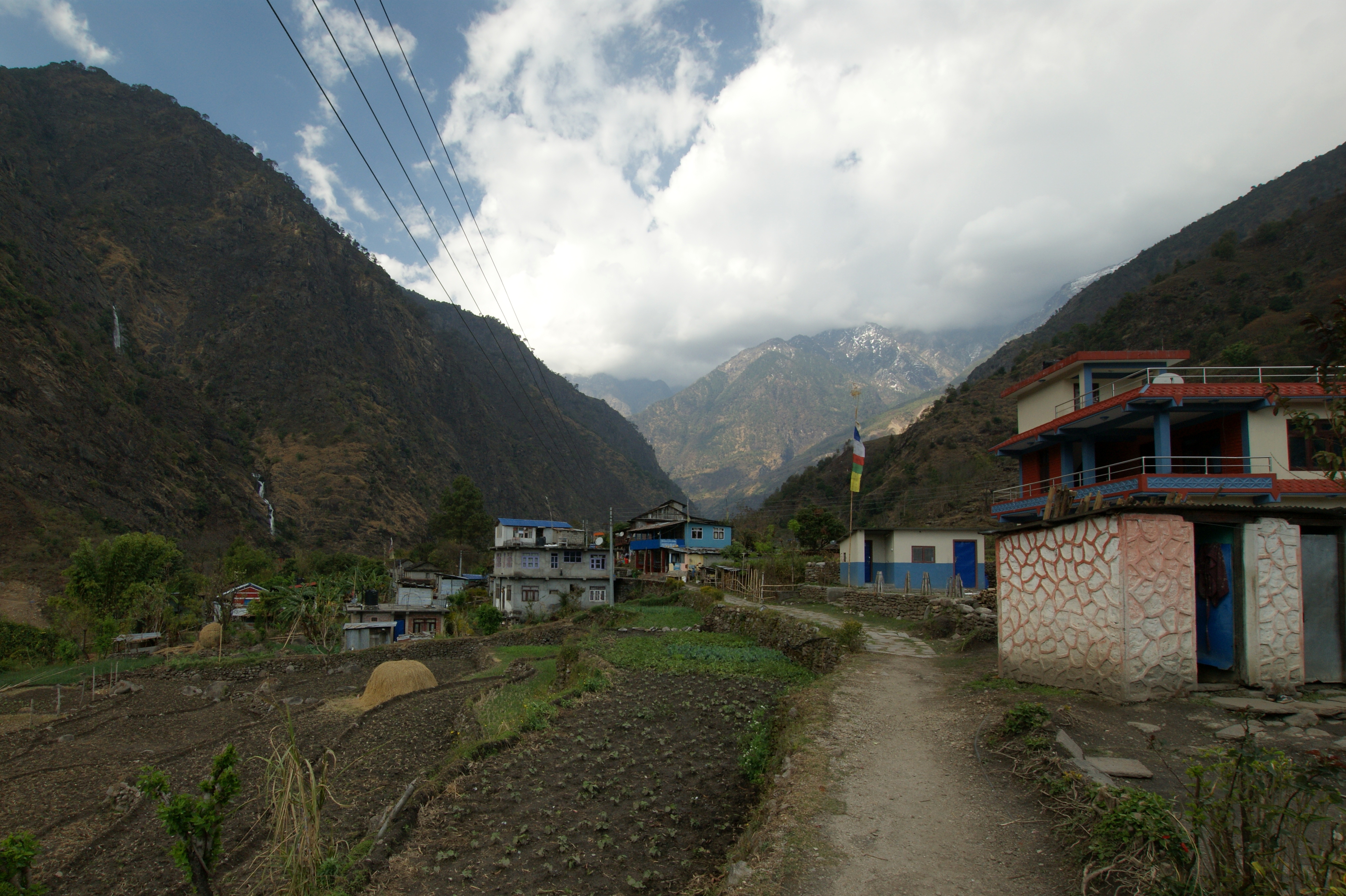

- Location in Nepal Ghermu (Nepal)
- Coordinates: 28.44°N 84.44°E
- Country: Nepal
- Zone: Gandaki Zone
- District: Lamjung District

Population (1991)
  - Total: 1,950
- Time zone: UTC+5:45 (Nepal Time)

Ghermu is a village development committee in Lamjung District in the Gandaki Zone of northern-central Nepal. At the time of the 1991 Nepal census it had a population of 1950 people living in 365 individual households.
