= Ishaneshwar =

Coordinates: 28°10′N 84°13′E

Ishaneshwar इशानेश्वर Karaputar
- Village development committee
- Location in Nepal Ishaneshwar (Nepal)
- Country: Nepal
- Zone: Gandaki Zone
- District: Lamjung District

Population (1991)
  - Total: 2,517
- Time zone: UTC+5:45 (Nepal Time)

Ishaneshwar is a village development committee in Lamjung District in the Gandaki Zone of northern-central Nepal. At the time of the 1991 Nepal census it had a population of 2517 people living in 522 individual households.
