= Tarkughat =

Tarkughat तार्कुघाट
- Village development committee
- Location in Nepal Tarkughat (Nepal)
- Coordinates: 28.12°N 84.45°E
- Country: Nepal
- Zone: Gandaki Zone
- District: Lamjung District

Population (1991)
  - Total: 2,650
- Time zone: UTC+5:45 (Nepal Time)
- Postal Code: 33611
- Area code: 066

Tarkughat is a village development committee in Lamjung District in the Gandaki Zone of northern-central Nepal. At the time of the 1991 Nepal census it had a population of 2650 people living in 536 individual households. This village lies at the bank of Marsyangdi river.
