= Ghalegaun =

Ghalegaun घलेगाउँ
- Hill Station
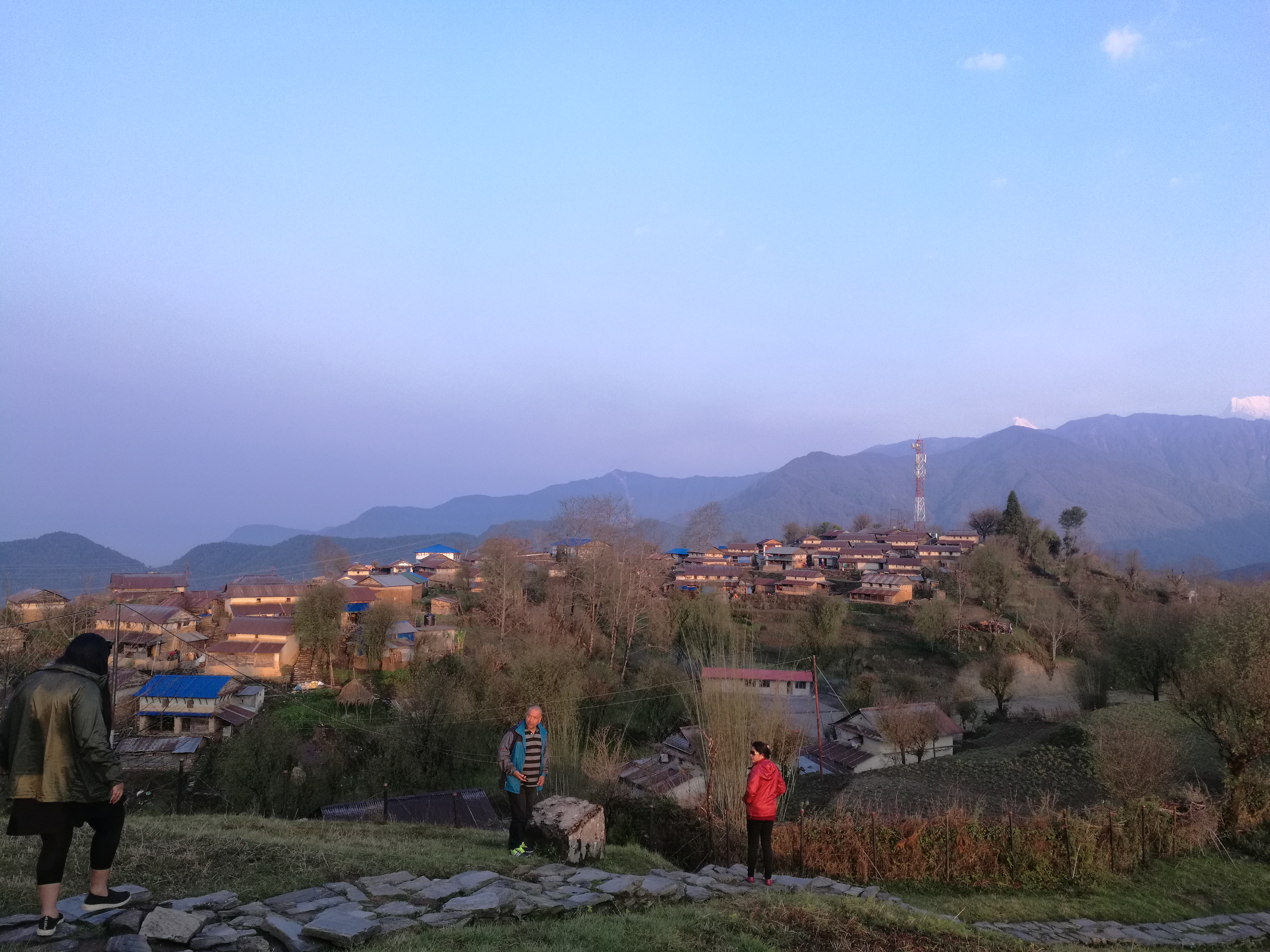
- Ghalegaun

- Location in Nepal Ghalegaun (Nepal)
- Coordinates: 28°27′50″N 84°30′20″E
- Country: Nepal
- Number 4: Federal State
- Zone: Gandaki Zone
- District: Lamjung District
- Highest elevation: 2,100 m (6,900 ft)

Population
  - Ethnics group: Gurung
  - Religions: Hinduism; Buddhism
- Time zone: UTC+5:45 (NST)

Ghalegaun (Nepali: घलेगाउँ), or Ghale Gaun, is popular scenic tourist destination with an elevation of 2,100 metres above sea level in Lamjung District. Ghalegaun is also known as Asia's model tourism village. It lies in Kwholasothar rural Municipality of Nepal. The village is situated at approximately 108 km northwest of Kathmandu and 12.5 km northeast of Pokhara, Nepal. It is surrounded by the Annapurna Circuit. The SAARC Village Tourism Museum, inaugurated by Bidhya Devi Bhandari in 2017, is one of the attractions of Ghalegaun.

Visitors numbers continue to increase, and the village is developed as a model tourist destination in SAARC countries.

== Mountains seen from Ghalegaun ==
- Mount Machhapuchare (6993m)
- Mount Annapurna (8091m)
- Mount Annapurna II (7939m)
- Mount Annapurna IV (7525m)
- Mount Lamjung (6932m)
- Mount Manaslu (8163m)
- Mount Ngadi Chuli (7871m)
- Mount Himal Chuli North (7331m)
- Mount Himal Chuli (7893m)

== Gallery ==
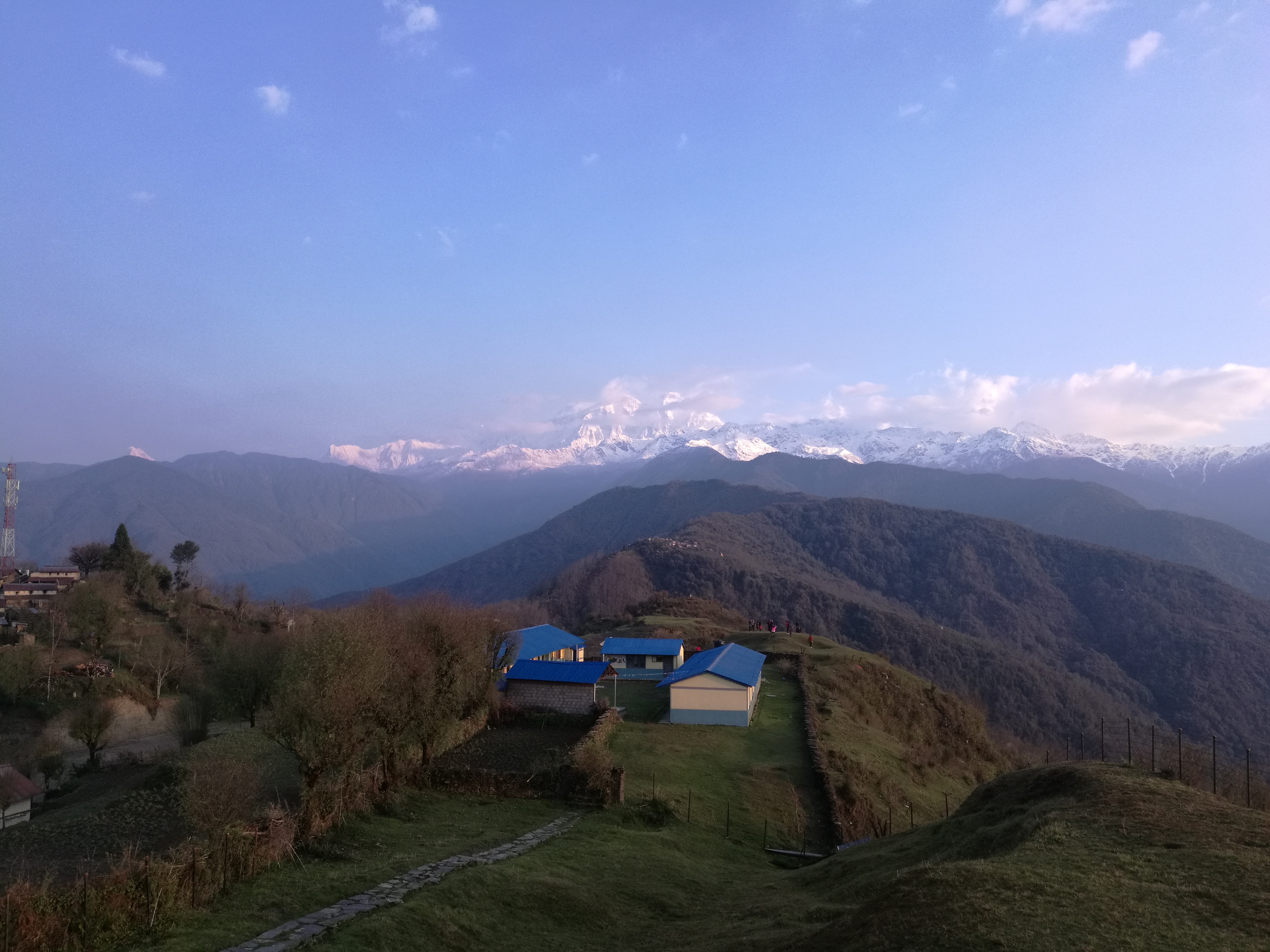
Mountain view in background from Ghalegaun.

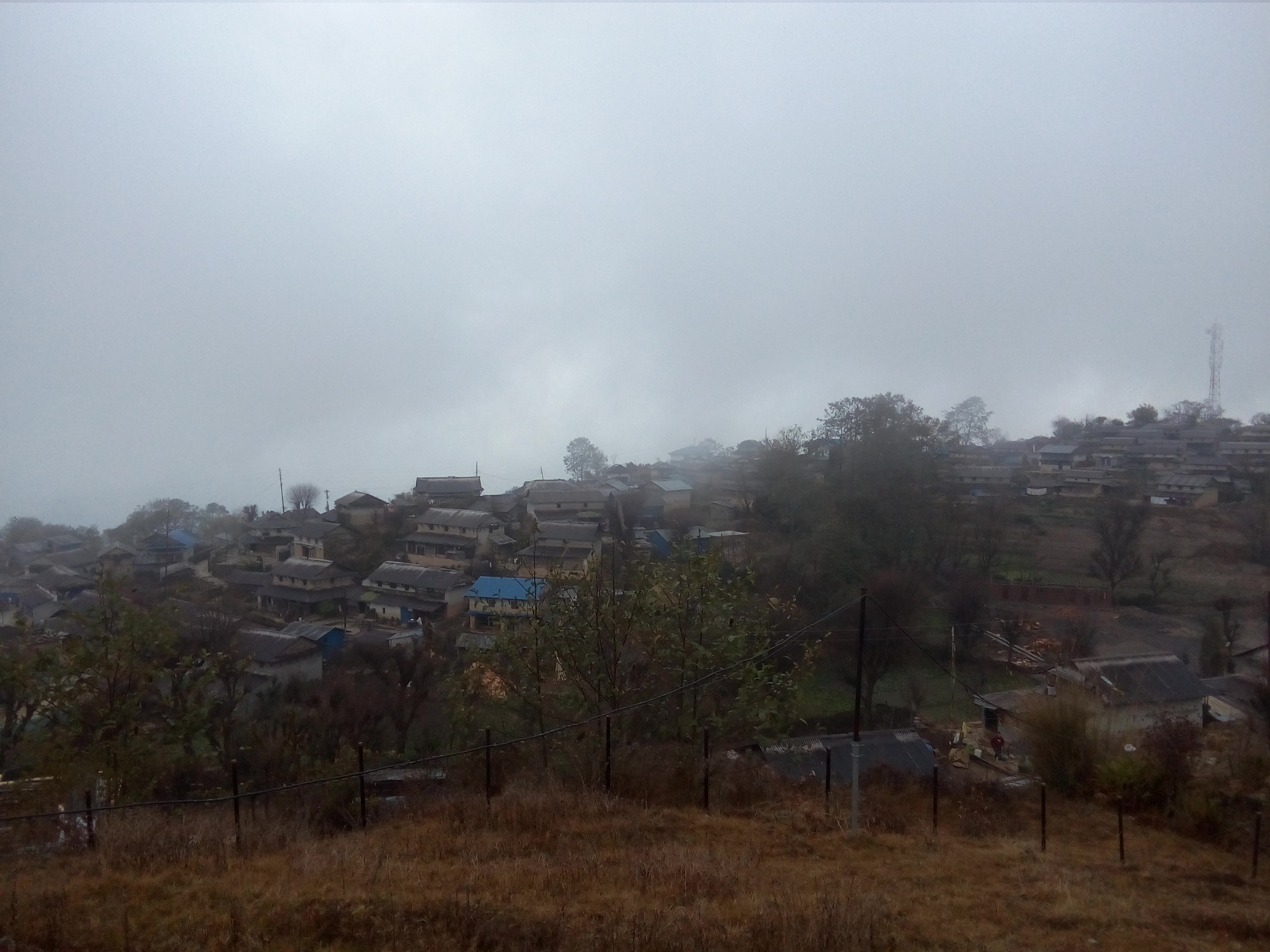
Ghalegaun seen in mist.

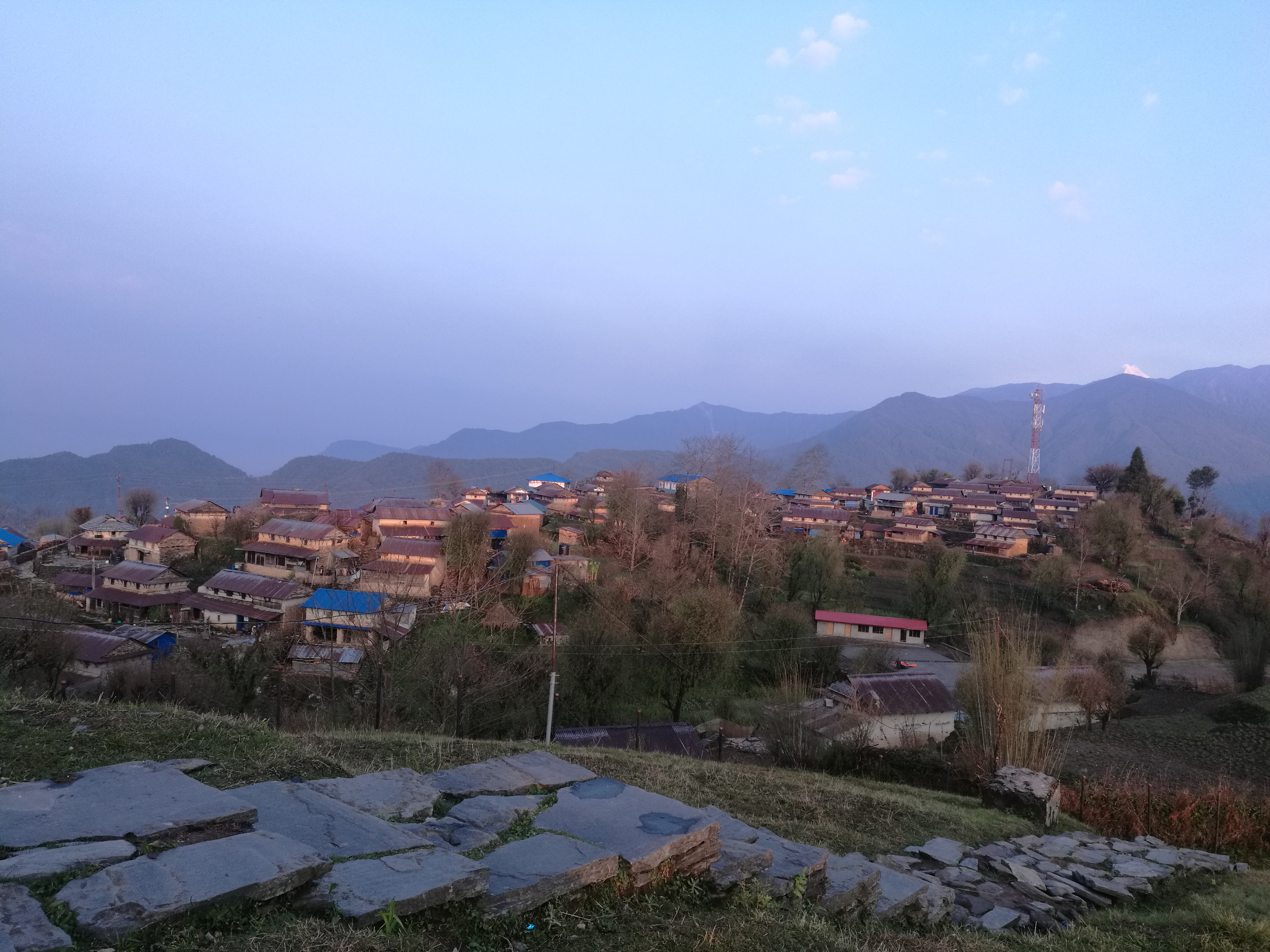
Ghalegaun.

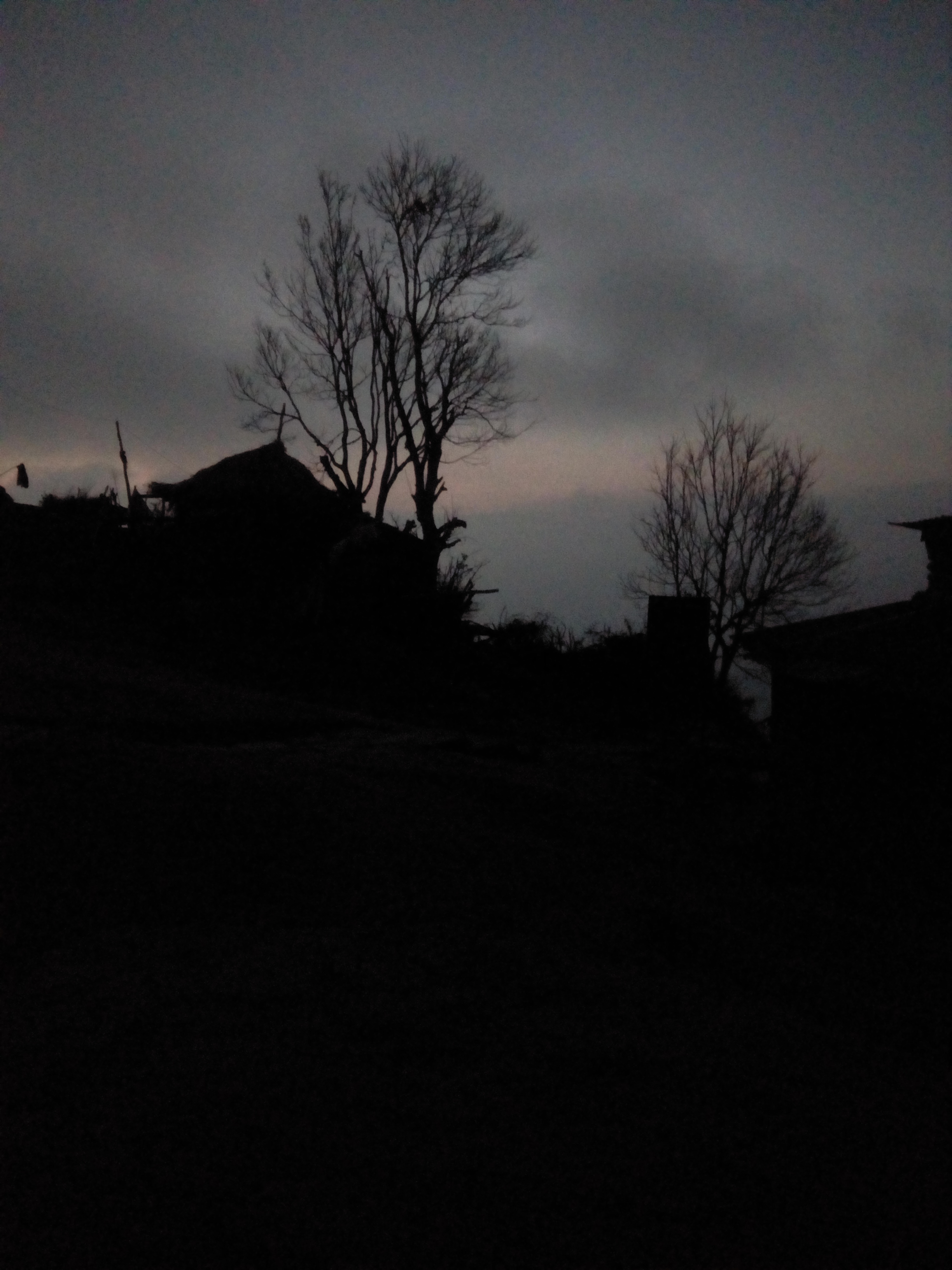
Ghalegaun, early in the morning.
