= Taghring =

Taghring टाङरिङ
- Village development committee
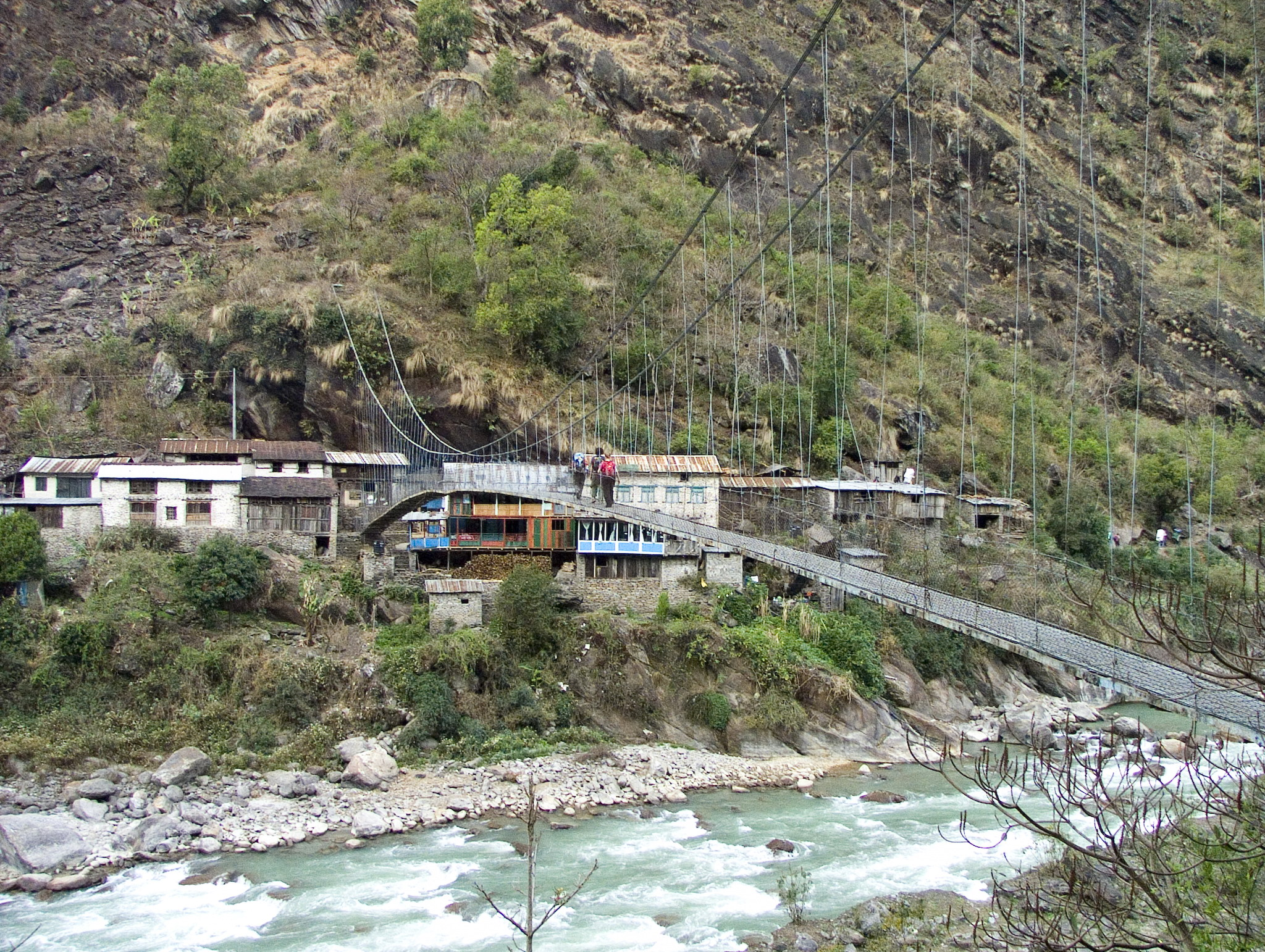
- Bridge crossing with Taghring in the background

- Location in Nepal Taghring (Nepal)
- Coordinates: 28.41°N 84.38°E
- Country: Nepal
- Zone: Gandaki Zone
- District: Lamjung District

Population (2011)
  - Total: 2,318
- Time zone: UTC+5:45 (Nepal Time)

Taghring is a village development committee in Lamjung District in the Gandaki Zone of northern-central Nepal. At the time of the 2011 Nepal census it had a population of 2,318, 1,113 of them being male and 1,205 being female, living in 521 individual households.
