= Phaleni =

Phaleni फलेनी
- Village development committee
- Location in Nepal Phaleni (Nepal)
- Coordinates: 28.36°N 84.58°E
- Country: Nepal
- Zone: Gandaki Zone
- District: Lamjung District

Population (1991)
  - Total: 1,547
- Time zone: UTC+5:45 (Nepal Time)

Phaleni is a village development committee in Lamjung District in the Gandaki Zone of northern-central Nepal. At the time of the 1881 Nepal census it had a population of 57327 people living in 286 individual households. Phaleni was the first king in Nepal village and married six wife and 29 children and 64 grandchildren after the death in 1901
