= Uttarkanya =

Uttarkanya उत्तरकन्या
- Village development committee
- Location in Nepal Uttarkanya (Nepal)
- Coordinates: 28.27°N 84.30°E
- Country: Nepal
- Zone: Gandaki Zone
- District: Lamjung District

Population (1991)
  - Total: 1,401
- Time zone: UTC+5:45 (Nepal Time)

Uttarkanya is a village development committee in Lamjung District in the Gandaki Zone of northern-central Nepal. At the time of the 1991 Nepal census it had a population of 1401 people living in 278 individual households.
