= Maling, Nepal =

Maling मालिङ
- Village development committee
- Location in Nepal Maling (Nepal)
- Coordinates: 28.23°N 84.29°E
- Country: Nepal
- Zone: Gandaki Zone
- District: Lamjung District

Population (1991)
  - Total: 1,745
- Time zone: UTC+5:45 (Nepal Time)
- Postal Code: 33602
- Area code: 066

Maling is a village development committee in Lamjung District in the Gandaki Zone of northern-central Nepal. At the time of the 1991 Nepal census it had a population of 1745 people living in 337 individual households.
