= Bharte =

Village development committee of Lamjung District, Nepal

Bharte is a village development committee of Lamjung District in the western part of Nepal. It is approximately 14 km from Besisahar, 165 km from Kathmandu, and 94 km from Pokhara.

The major ethnic groups are Bramins, Chhetri, Gurung, and Magar. The major language is Nepali and the major religion is Hinduism.
