= Bangre =

Bangre बाङ्ग्रे
- Village development committee
- Location in Nepal Bangre (Nepal)
- Coordinates: 28.16°N 84.28°E
- Country: Nepal
- Zone: Gandaki Zone
- District: Lamjung District

Population (1991)
  - Total: 1,776
- Time zone: UTC+5:45 (Nepal Time)

Bangre is a village development committee in Lamjung District in the Gandaki Zone of northern-central Nepal. At the time of the 1991 Nepal census it had a population of 1776 people living in 350 individual households.
