= Gilung =

Coordinates: 28°13′N 84°13′E

Gilung गिलुङ Klinu
- Village development committee
- Nickname: Klinu
- Location in Nepal Gilung (Nepal)
- Country: Nepal
- Zone: Gandaki Zone
- District: Lamjung District

Population (2110)
  - Total: 1,941
- Time zone: UTC+5:45 (Nepal Time)
- Postal Code: 33606
- Area code: 066

Gilung is a village development committee in Lamjung District in the Gandaki Zone of northern-central Nepal.It is a traditional hill settlement known for its natural surroundings, rural lifestyle, and cultural heritage. The village is home to a predominantly Gurung (Pom) community and has a rich tradition of local customs, festivals, music, dance, and community based social practices. The surrounding landscape consists of hills, forests, agricultural land, and mountain views, providing a distinctive rural environment.

Traditionally, agriculture and livestock farming have been important sources of livelihood for local residents, while in recent decades employment, education, migration, and remittances have also become significant parts of village life. Gilung has schools, roads, electricity, communication facilities, and other basic infrastructure that connect the village with nearby settlements and market areas.

The village also has religious and cultural sites, traditional houses, and community spaces that reflect the history and lifestyle of the local people. Festivals such as Tamu Lhosar and other traditional celebrations are important occasions for bringing the community together. In addition to its cultural significance, Gilung has potential for cultural and rural tourism because of its traditional Gurung heritage, natural scenery, walking routes, and views of the surrounding hills and mountains.

As with many rural settlements in Nepal, Gilung has experienced changes in population and lifestyle as younger residents increasingly move to urban areas or abroad for education and employment, while local communities continue efforts to preserve their cultural traditions and develop the village.

At the time of the 1991 Nepal census it had a population of 2110 people living in 419 individual households.
