= Pasagaun =

Pasgaun, A "Gurung Village" पसगाउँ Paiko (Paingo) Nasa
- Village development committee,
- Location in Nepal Pasgaun, A "Gurung Village" (Nepal)
- Coordinates: 28.30°N 84.22°E
- Country: Nepal
- Zone: Gandaki Zone
- District: Lamjung District

Population (1991)
  - Total: 1,856
- Time zone: UTC+5:45 (Nepal Time)

Pasgaun is a village development committee in Lamjung District in the Gandaki Zone of northern-central Nepal. At the time of the 1991 Nepal census it had a population of 1,856. It is one of the emerging tourist destinations in Nepal providing "Home Stay" services to visitors. It is a predominantly Gurung village. ("Gurung" is a word used to describe a certain ethnic tribe of Nepal in the Nepali language, whereas in their own language they call themselves "Tamu", which translates as people of the highlands.) Besides Gurungs, Pasgaun also has people of other castes such as Kami and Damain.

Pasgaun is now connected with a rough road.
