= Karapu =

Karapu करापु
- Village development committee
- Location in Nepal Karapu (Nepal)
- Coordinates: 28.20°N 84.24°E
- Country: Nepal
- Zone: Gandaki Zone
- District: Lamjung District

Population (2011)
  - Total: 2,003
- Time zone: UTC+5:45 (Nepal Time)

Karapu is a Lamjung District Madhyanepal Municipality word no 08 Gandaki Province of northern-central Nepal. At the time of the 1991 Nepal census it had a population of 2549 people living in 509 individual households.
