= Chakratirtha =

Chakratirtha चक्रतीर्थ
- Village development committee
- Location in Nepal Chakratirtha (Nepal)
- Coordinates: 28.11°N 84.52°E
- Country: Nepal
- Zone: Gandaki Zone
- District: Lamjung District

Population (1991)
  - Total: 3,813
- Time zone: UTC+5:45 (Nepal Time)

Chakratirtha is a village development committee in Lamjung District in the Gandaki Zone of northern-central Nepal. At the time of the 1991 Nepal census it had a population of 3813 people living in 749 individual households.
