= Simpani, Lamjung =

Simpani सिमपानी
- Village development committee
- Location in Nepal Simpani (Nepal)
- Coordinates: 28.27°N 84.35°E
- Country: Nepal
- Zone: Gandaki Zone
- District: Lamjung District

Population (1991)
  - Total: 3,185
- Time zone: UTC+5:45 (Nepal Time)

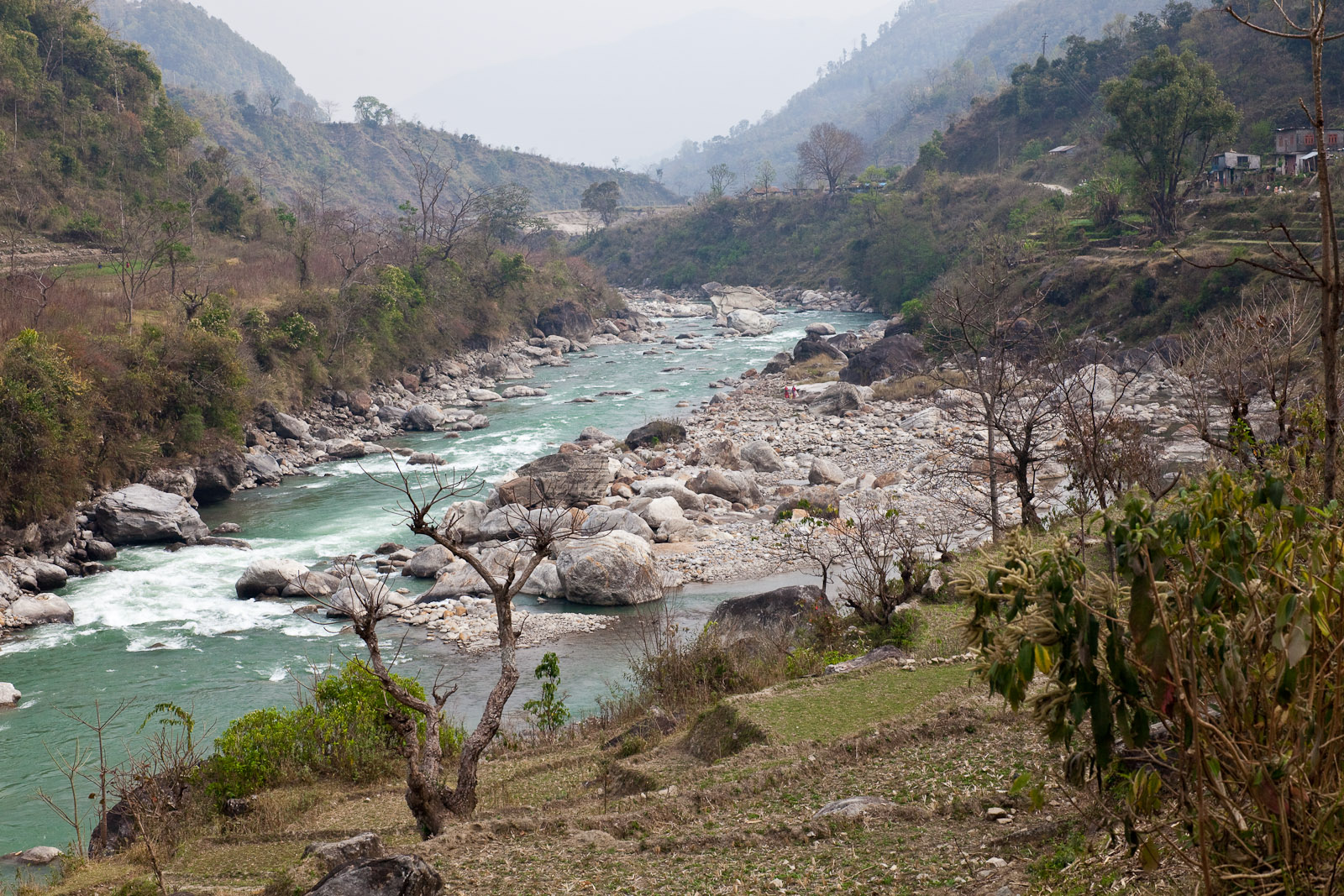
The Marsyangdi river with alluvium sizes from sand to houses.

Simpani is a village development committee in Lamjung District in the Gandaki Zone of northern-central Nepal. At the time of the 1991 Nepal census it had a population of 3185 people living in 607 individual households.
