= Bhorletar =

Bhorletar भोर्लेटार
- Municipality (Madhyanepal municipality 06)
- Location in Nepal Bhorletar (Nepal)
- Coordinates: 28.15°N 84.25°E
- Country: Nepal
- Zone: Gandaki Zone
- District: Lamjung District

Population (1991)
  - Total: 2,526
- Time zone: UTC+5:45 (Nepal Time)

Bhorletar is a [town(Nepal)] in Lamjung District in the Gandaki Zone of northern-central Nepal. At the time of the 1991 Nepal census it had a population of 2526 people living in 491 individual households.

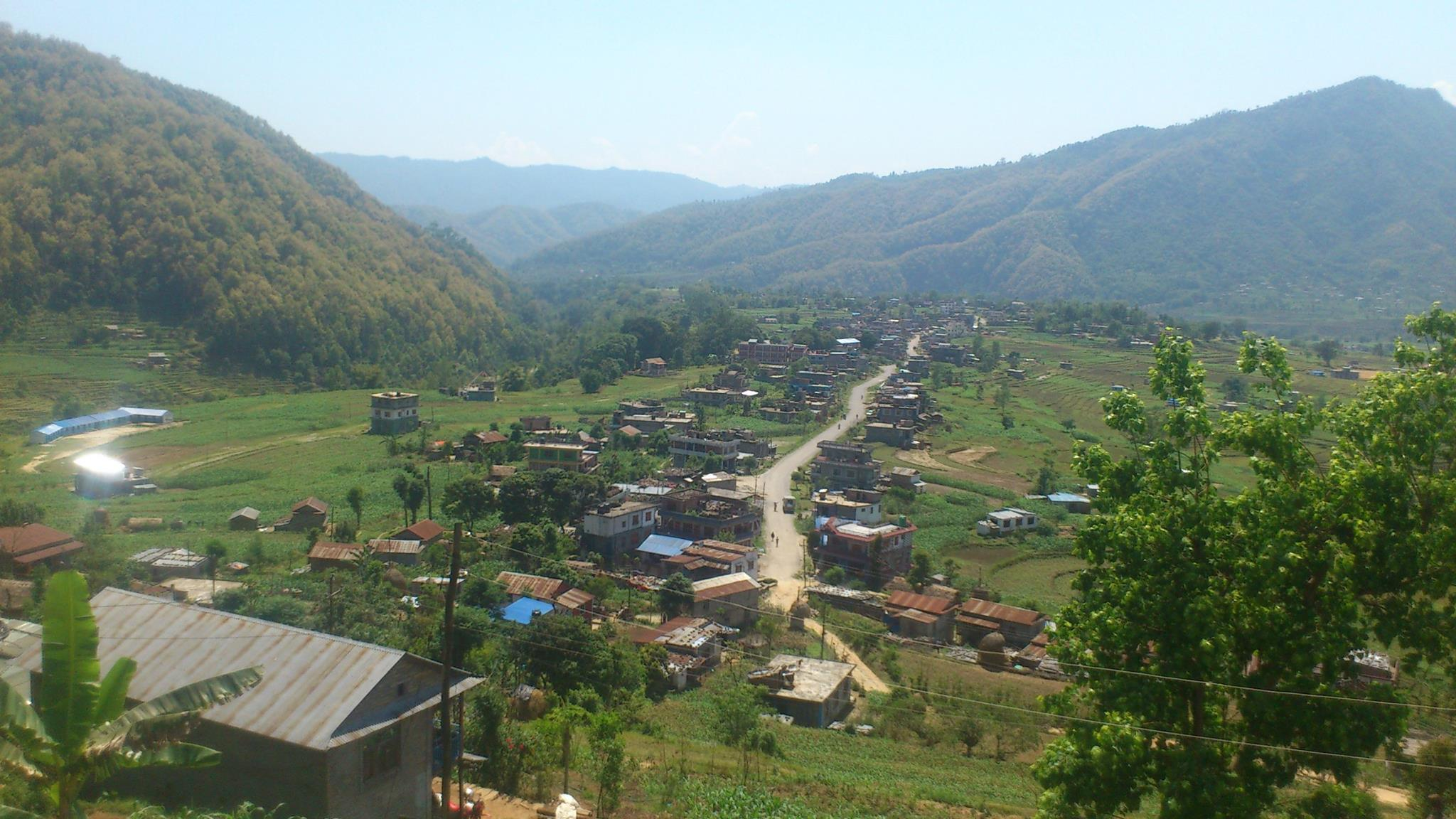
Bhorletar 2015
