= Bichaur =

Bichour बिचौर
- Village development committee
- Location in Nepal Bichour (Nepal)
- Coordinates: 28.21°N 84.60°E
- Country: Nepal
- Zone: Gandaki Zone
- District: Lamjung District

Population (1991)
  - Total: 2,462
- Time zone: UTC+5:45 (Nepal Time)

Bichaur is a village development committee in Lamjung District in the Gandaki Zone of northern-central Nepal. At the time of the 1991 Nepal census it had a population of 2462 people living in 488 individual households.

== 2015 Nepal earthquake ==
The village was affected by the April 2015 earthquake, and was, along with Ilampokhari, Dudhpokhari, Gaudu, Kolki and Pyarjung, among the most affected villages in Lamjung district.
