= Gauda, Nepal =

Gauda, Nepal गौंडा
- Village development committee
- Location in Nepal Gauda, Nepal (Nepal)
- Coordinates: 28.18°N 84.52°E
- Country: Nepal
- Zone: Gandaki Zone
- District: Lamjung District

Population (1991)
  - Total: 3,325
- Time zone: UTC+5:45 (Nepal Time)
- Postal Code: 33610
- Area code: 066

Gauda, Nepal is a village development committee in Lamjung District in the Gandaki Zone of northern-central Nepal. At the time of the 1991 Nepal census it had a population of 3,325 living in 650 individual households.

== 2015 Nepal earthquake ==
The village was affected by the April 2015 earthquake, and was, along with Bichaur, Dudhpokhari, Ilampokhari, Kolki and Pyarjung, among the most affected villages in Lamjung district. Nepti Tamang, 91, Sher Bahadur Tamang, 62, and three-and-a-half-month-old Sumit Bika were three of the four fatalities caused by the earthquake in Lamjung district.
