= Gautam =

Gautam may refer to:

- Gautam (given name), including a list of people with the name
- Gautam (clan), a Rajput clan in India
- Gautam (Nepali name), a surname

== See also ==
- Gautama (etymology)
