= Sundarbazar =

Sundarbazar सुन्दरबजार
- Municipality
- Motto: Clean City Green City
- Location in Nepal Sundarbazar (Nepal)
- Coordinates: 28.13°N 84.42°E
- Country: Nepal
- States of Nepal: Gandaki Province
- District: Lamjung District

Government
  - Executive Officer: Sukdev Lamsal

Population (2011)
  - Total: 26,894
- Time zone: UTC+5:45 (NST)
- Postal Code: 33603
- Area code: 066
- Website: sundarbazarmun.gov.np

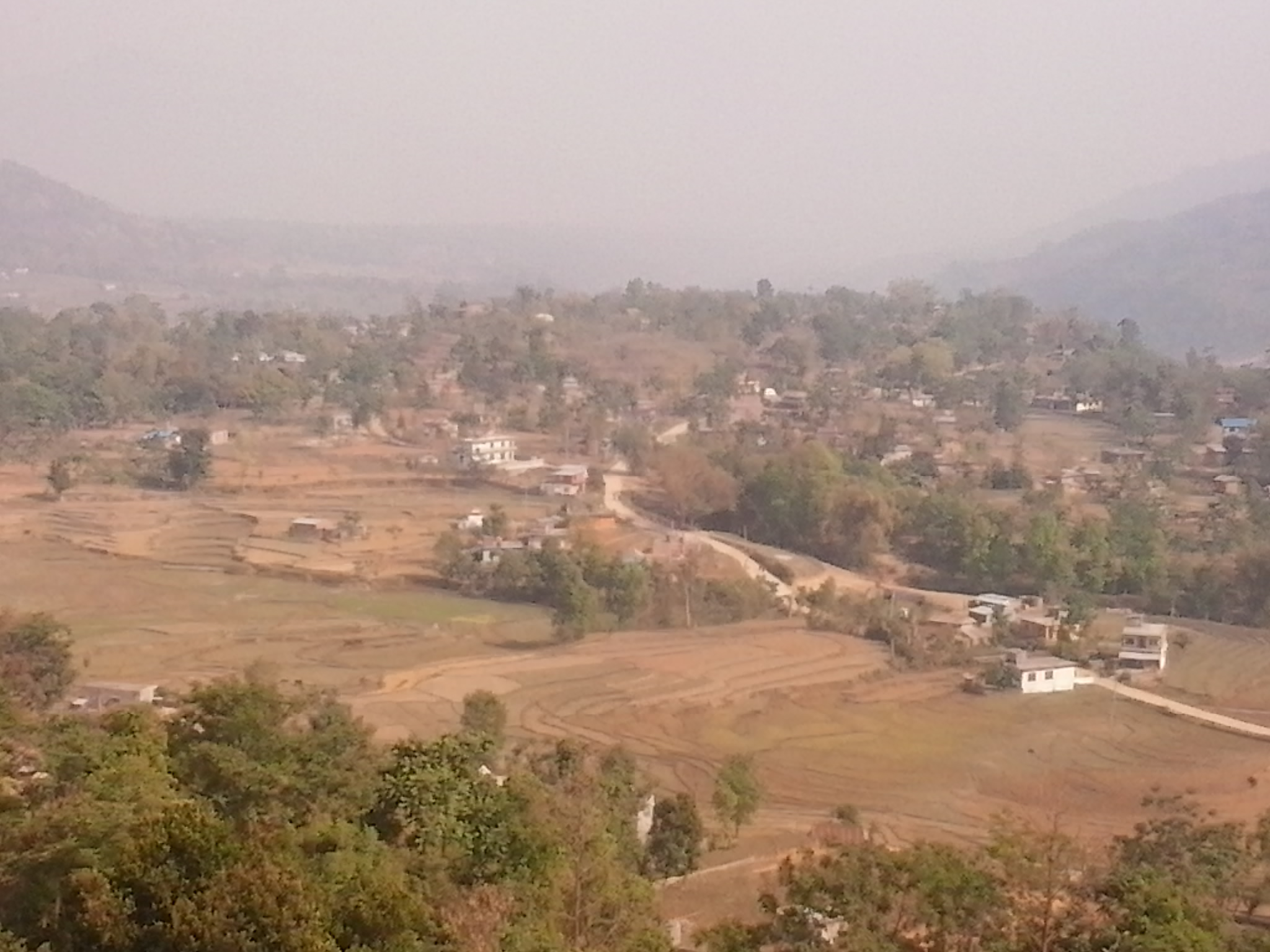

Sundarbazar is a Municipality in Lamjung District in the Gandaki Province of northern-central Nepal. The Sundarbazar Municipality was formed by merging the existing Village Development Committees i.e. Bhoteodar, Sundarbazar, Parewadanda, Tarku and Kuncha as one of the 61-municipalities category on 2071. As of 2011 Nepal census, it had 11,230 male population and 15,445 female population living in 7,512 households.

Sundarbazar is the education center of the Lamjung district. There are two campuses affiliated by Tribhuvan University Nepal, namely Matribhumi Campus and Lamjung Agriculture and Animal Science Campus. Sundarbazar is one of the major center of the lamjung district. There are many schools running such as Adarsha High School, Insight Vision Academy, Bal Jyoti School etc. The temperatures are highest on average in June, at around 35.7 °C. January has the lowest average temperature of the year, at 14.5 °C. The least rainfall occurs in December. The average in this month is 9 mm. With an average of 700 mm, the most precipitation falls in July.

Religion in Sundarbazar (2011)

Hindu-81.3%

Buddhist-9.0% Muslim-5%
