= Ilampokhari =

Ilampokhari इलमपोखरी सानो काभे् गाउॅं ४
- Village development committee
- Location in Nepal Ilampokhari (Nepal)
- Coordinates: 28.18°N 84.59°E
- Country: Nepal
- Zone: Gandaki Zone
- District: Lamjung District

Population (1991)
  - Total: 3,197
- Time zone: UTC+5:45 (Nepal Time)

Ilampokhari is a village development committee in Lamjung District in the Gandaki Zone of northern-central Nepal. At the 1991 Nepal census, it had a population of 3197 people living in 620 individual households.

The village was affected by the April 2015 earthquake, and was, along with Bichaur, Dudhpokhari, Gaudu, Kolki and Pyarjung, among the most affected villages in Lamjung district. Lakshmi Gurung, 18, of Ilampokhari village was one of the four people killed by the impact of the earthquake in Lamjung district.
