= Kolki =

Kolki, Nepal कोल्की
- Village development committee
- Location in Nepal Kolki, Nepal (Nepal)
- Coordinates: 28.15°N 84.56°E
- Country: Nepal
- Zone: Gandaki Zone
- District: Lamjung District

Population (1991)
  - Total: 1,892
- Time zone: UTC+5:45 (Nepal Time)

Kolki is a village development committee in Lamjung District in the Gandaki Zone of northern-central Nepal. At the time of the 1991 Nepal census it had a population of 1892 people living in 354 individual households.

== 2015 Nepal earthquake ==
The village was affected by the earthquake on 25 April 2015. It along with Bichaur, Ilampokhari, Dudhpokhari, Gauda, and Pyarjung were the most affected villages in Lamjung district.
