= Dudhpokhari =

Dudhpokhari दूधपोखरी
- Village development committee
- Location in Nepal Dudhpokhari (Nepal)
- Coordinates: 28.26°N 84.62°E
- Country: Nepal
- Province: Gandaki Province
- District: Lamjung District

Population (2011)
  - Total: 10,975
- Time zone: UTC+5:45 (Nepal Time)

Dudhpokhari (दूधपोखरी) is a village development committee in Lamjung District in the Gandaki Province of northern-central Nepal. The name Dudhpokhari is derived from the lake which lies at the base of Himalchuli. At the time of the 2011 Nepal census it had a population of 10,975 people living in 2590 individual households. The highest elevation is Mount Himalchuli. Dudhpokhari kunda, which lies at the base of Himalchuli, is a popular religious destination which attracts thousand of Hindus in Shrawan during Janai Purnima.

== 2015 Nepal earthquake ==
The village was affected by the earthquake on 25 April 2015, along with Ilampokhari, Gaudu, Kolki and Pyarjung in the Lamjung district.

== Mount Himalchuli ==
Himalchuli, which lies in the Dudhpokhari village development committee is the second highest mountain in the Mansiri Himal, part of the Nepalese Himalayas. It lies south of Manaslu, one of the eight-thousanders. Himalchuli has three main peaks: East (7893 m), West (7540 m) and North (7371 m). It is also often written as two words, "Himal Chuli".

Himalchuli is the 18th highest mountain in the world (using a cutoff of 500m prominence, or re-ascent). It is also notable for its large vertical relief over local terrain. For example, it rises 7000m over the Marshyangdi River to the southwest in about 27 km (17 mi) horizontal distance
