= Pyarjung =

Pyarjung प्यारजंग
- Village development committee
- Location in Nepal Pyarjung (Nepal)
- Coordinates: 28.15°N 84.53°E
- Country: Nepal
- Zone: Gandaki Zone
- District: Lamjung District

Population (1991)
  - Total: 2,256
- Time zone: UTC+5:45 (Nepal Time)

Pyarjung is a village development committee in Lamjung District in the Gandaki Zone of northern-central Nepal. At the time of the 1991 Nepal census it had a population of 2256 people living in 443 individual households.

== 2015 Nepal earthquake ==
The village was affected by the earthquake on 25 April 2015. It along with Bichaur, Ilampokhari, Dudhpokhari, Gaudu, and Kolki were the most affected villages in Lamjung district.
