= Lamjung District =

Coordinates: 28°14′N 82°25′E

Lamjung District लमजुङ
- District
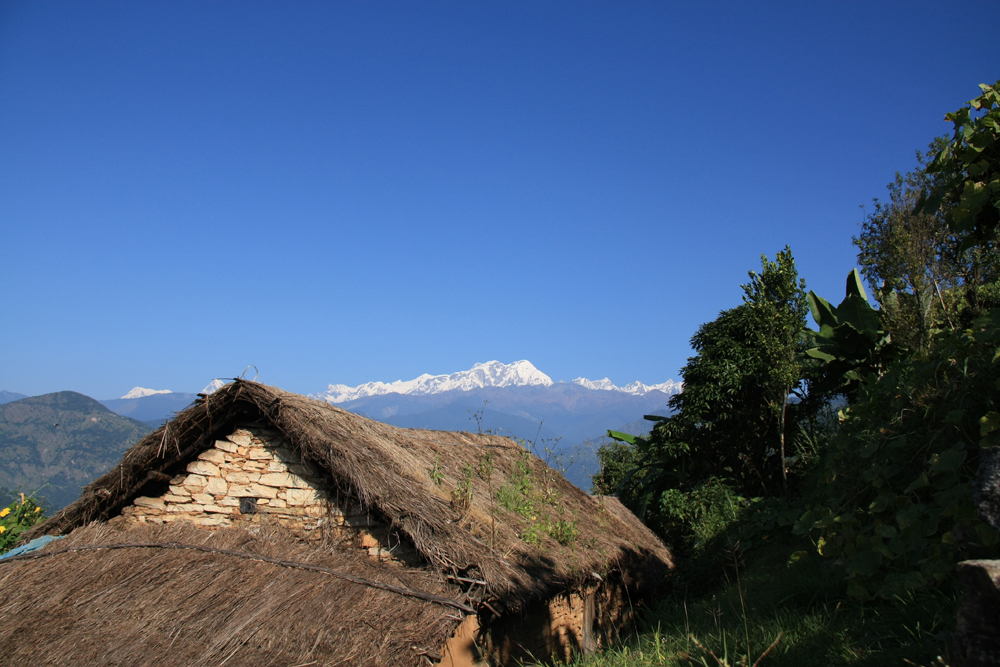
- Interactive map of Lamjung District
- Country: Nepal
- Province: Gandaki Province
- Admin HQ.: Besisahar

Government
  - Type: Coordination committee
  - Body: DCC, Lamjung

Area
  - Total: 1,692 km^{2} (653 sq mi)

Population (2011)
  - Total: 167,728
  - Density: 99.13/km^{2} (256.7/sq mi)
- Time zone: UTC+05:45 (NPT)
- Telephone Code: 066
- Main Language(s): Nepali, Gurung, Magar, Dura
- Website: Official website

Lamjung District (Nepali: लमजुङ जिल्ला [ˈlʌmd͡zuŋ]), a part of Gandaki Province, is one of the seventy-seven districts of Nepal. The district, with Besisahar as its district headquarters, covers an area of 1,692 square kilometres (653 sq mi) and as of 2011 had a population of 167,724. lies in the mid-hills of Nepal spanning tropical to trans-Himalayan geo-ecological belts, including the geographical midpoint of the country (i.e., Duipipal). It has mixed habitation of castes and ethnicities. It is host to probably the highest density of the Gurung ethnic population in the country.

Popular Media in Lamjung Includes Mero Lamjung, Radio Chautari, Aantaranga Saptahik, Radio Marsyangdi, Radio Lamjung, etc.

== Geography and climate ==
Climate Zone	Elevation Range	% of Area
Upper Tropical	300 to 1,000 meters 1,000 to 3,300 ft.	18.5%
Subtropical	1,000 to 2,000 meters 3,300 to 6,600 ft.	34.0%
Temperate	2,000 to 3,000 meters 6,400 to 9,800 ft.	20.3%
Subalpine	3,000 to 4,000 meters 9,800 to 13,100 ft.	14.1%
Alpine	4,000 to 5,000 meters 13,100 to 16,400 ft.	8.0%
Nival	above 5,000 meters	3.6%
Trans-Himalayan	3,000 to 6,400 meters 9,800 to 21,000 ft.	1.3%

== Demographics ==
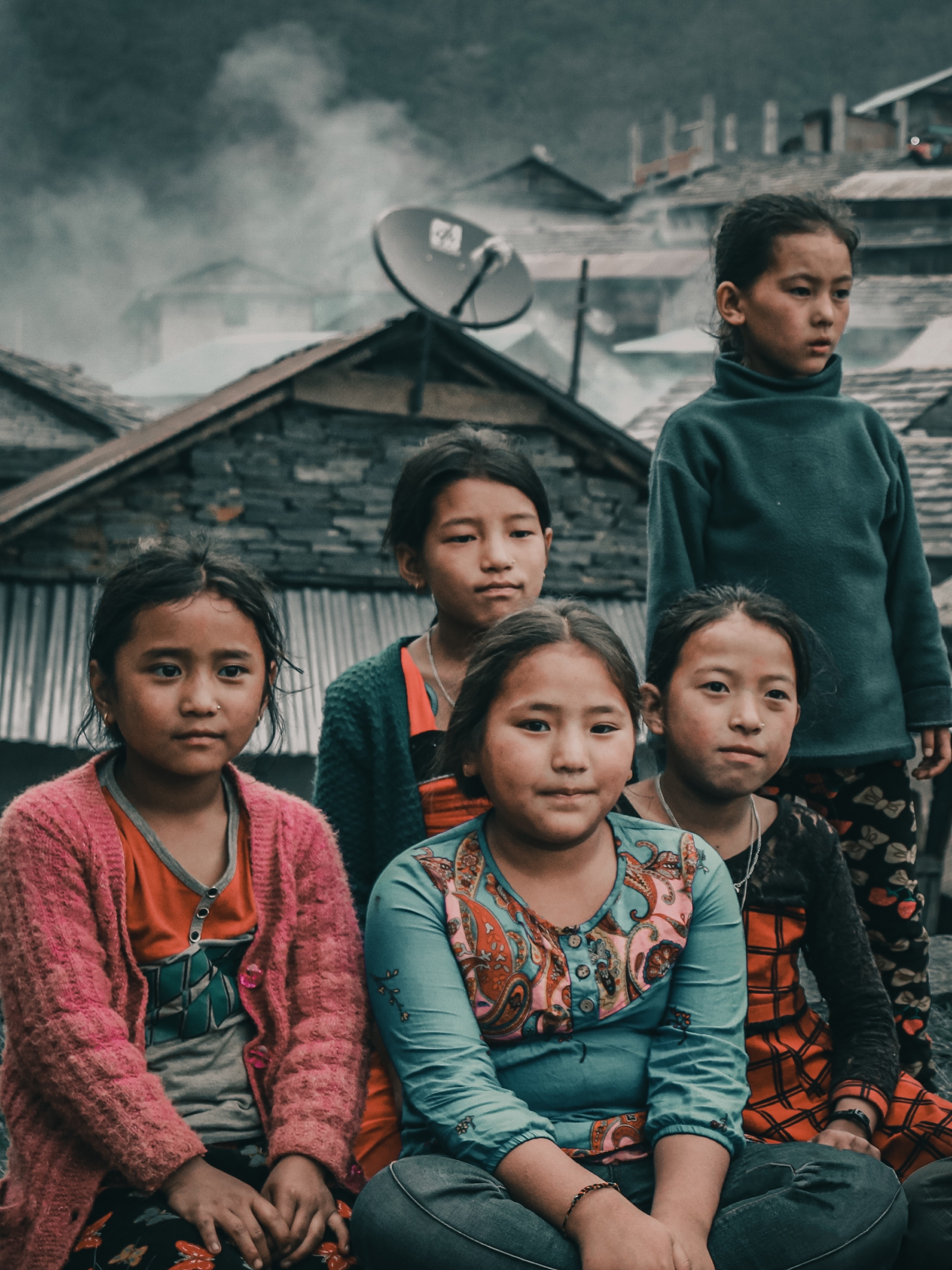
Children in Bhujung, Nepal

Historical population
Census year	Pop.	±% p.a.
1981	152,720	—
1991	153,697	+0.06%
2001	177,149	+1.43%
2011	167,724	−0.55%
2021	153,480	−0.88%
Source: Citypopulation

At the time of the 2021 Nepal census, Lamjung District had a population of 155,852. 5.97% of the population is under 5 years of age. It has a literacy rate of 77.49% and a sex ratio of 1104 females per 1000 males. 104,648 (67.15%) lived in municipalities.

Castes/ethnic groups in Lamjung district (2021)
1. Gurung (29.3%)
2. Chhetri (15.5%)
3. Bahun (11.7%)
4. Kami (8.98%)
5. Tamang (7.82%)
6. Sarki (5.60%)
7. Damai (4.02%)
8. Newar (3.75%)
9. Magar (2.46%)
10. Bhujel (2.30%)
11. Ghale (1.88%)
12. Dura (1.77%)
13. Kumal (1.14%)
14. Other Khas non-Dalit (1.45%)
15. Others (2.37%)

Hill Janjati and Khas people are the two largest groups, both making up 47% of the population. Khas Dalits were 19% of the population. The remainder is almost entirely made up of Newars.

Languages of Lamjung district (2021)
1. Nepali (59.6%)
2. Gurung (27.7%)
3. Tamang (6.71%)
4. Nepal Bhasha (1.58%)
5. Magar (0.99%)
6. Others (3.36%)

At the time of the 2021 census, 59.62% of the population spoke Nepali, 27.74% Gurung, 6.71% Tamang, 1.58% Nepal Bhasha and 0.99% Magar as their first language. In 2011, 58.6% of the population spoke Nepali as their first language.

Religion in Lamjung District (2021)
Religion	Percent
Hinduism	62.44%
Buddhism	29.54%
Bon	4.66%
Christianity	2.48%
Islam	0.77%
Other or not stated	0.11%

== Rural municipalities and municipalities ==
- Besisahar Municipality
- Dordi Rural Municipality
- Dudhpokhari Rural Municipality
- Kwhlosothar Rural Municipality
- Madhya Nepal Municipality
- Marsyandi Rural Municipality
- Rainas Municipality
- Sundarbazar Municipality

== 2015 earthquake ==
The epicentre of an earthquake on 25 April 2015 was near Lamjung District that is Barpak of Gorkha district. Most of the major damage and casualties took place in nearby Kathmandu, Nepal's capital. The death toll was placed at over 8,800. However, only four deaths were reported in Lamjung District.

While Lamjung was the district with the 20th most deaths in Nepal, it was severely damaged. The villages of Bichaur, Ilampokhari, Dudhpokhari, Gauda, Kolki and Pyarjung were the most affected. Assistant Sub Inspector Bir Bahadur Thapa Magar identified the four deaths in Lamjung District as Lakshmi Gurung, 18, of Ilampokhari village; Nepti Tamang, 91, of Gaudu village; Sher Bahadur Tamang, 62, of Gaudu village; and three-and-a-half-month-old Sumit Bika of Gauda village. Twenty-five people were injured in Lamjung District. Local police estimate 2,094 houses were completely destroyed while another 2,129 houses were partially damaged.
