= Prakash Bhatta =

Music Video Director and Choreographer

- प्रकाश भट्ट
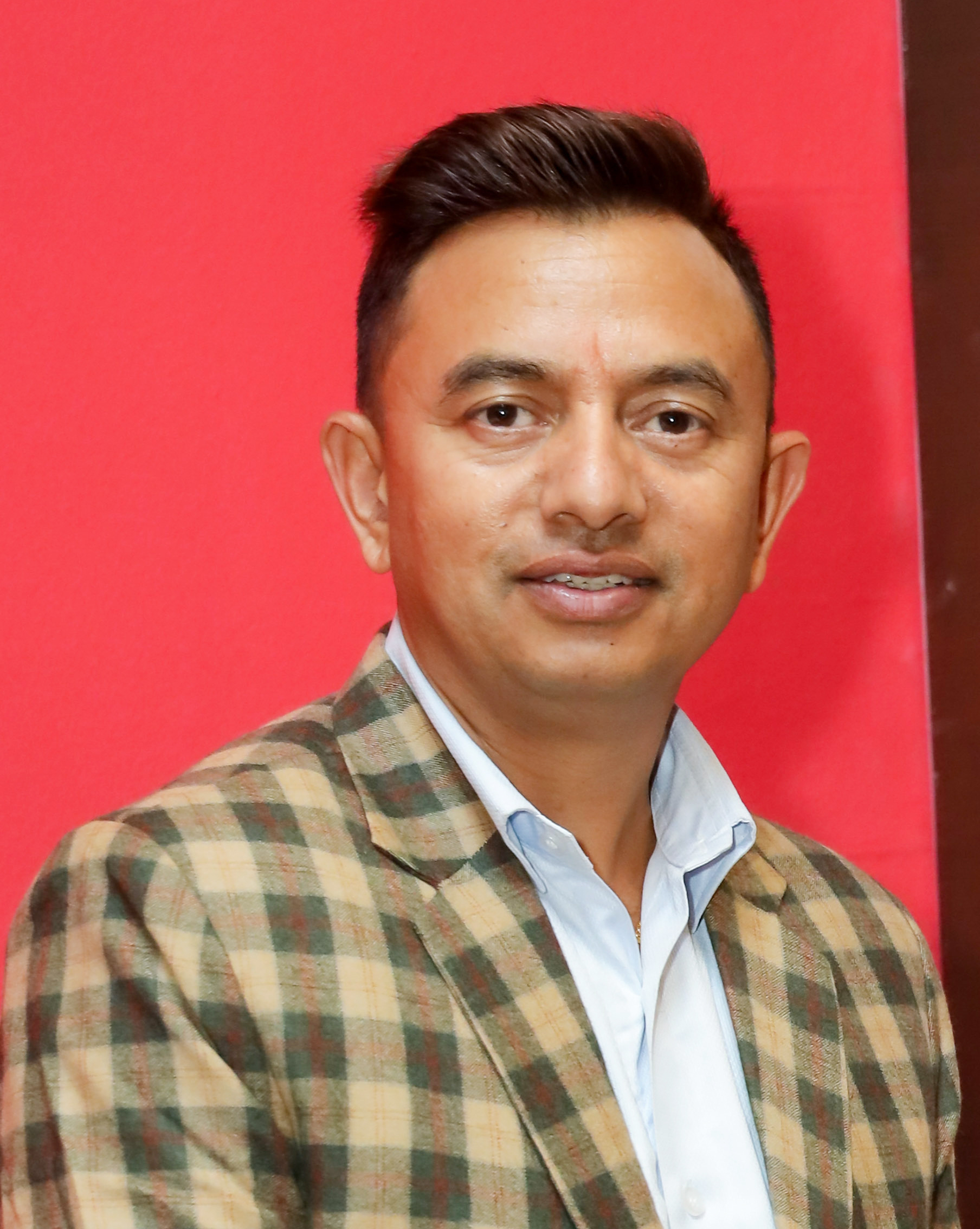
- Bhatta in 2023
- Born: 11 June 1977; Takukot, Gorkha, Nepal
- Occupation(s): Director, choreographer
- Years active: 1995–present

Prakash Bhatta (Nepali: प्रकाश भट्ट; born 11 June 1977 in Takukot) is a Nepali music video director and choreographer. He is the son of Dal Prasad Bhatta and Ratna Kumari Bhatta.

== Career ==
Bhatta is a Music Video Director and Choreographer in Nepal. He started his musical career in 2000. Prakash has directed numerous popular music videos, including "Driver Dai Man Paryo Malai," "Bhaise Palera," "Campus Padhna Aauni," "Om Namah Shiwaya," "Sora Duna Aath," "Nidheraima Laekheasi," ,"jham jham jhamkana" and many more. In fact, he has directed over 6,000 music videos. He has appeared in more than 200 music videos, with his performances. He has been honored with the Best Director Music Video Awards at prestigious events such as the First Pooja Lok Dohari Award 2012, 2nd Music Khabar Music Award 2013, 6rd Music Khabar Music Award, and so on.

== Songs ==
SN	Songs Name	Singer Name	Credit	Ref
1	Naujale Maya	Jaya Devkota, Shanti Shree Pariyar	Director	
2	Campus Padhna Aaune	Pashupati Sharma, Radhika Hamal	Director	
3	Driver Dai Man paryo	Bishnu Majhi	Director	
4	Malai America Yahi	Pashupati Sharma, Sita KC	Director	
5	Om Namaha Shiwaya	Pashupati Sharma, Tika Pun	Director	
6	Hamro Maya Jhan Jhan	Ramji Khand, Purnakala BC	Director	
7	Sora Duna Aath	Pashupati Sharma, Manju Mahat	Director	
8	Tame Karuwa	Khem Century, Januka Tamang	Director	
9	Lalumai	Sandip Neupane, Bishnu Majhi	Director	
