= Dolpo =

Dolpo डोल्पो • དོལ་པོ
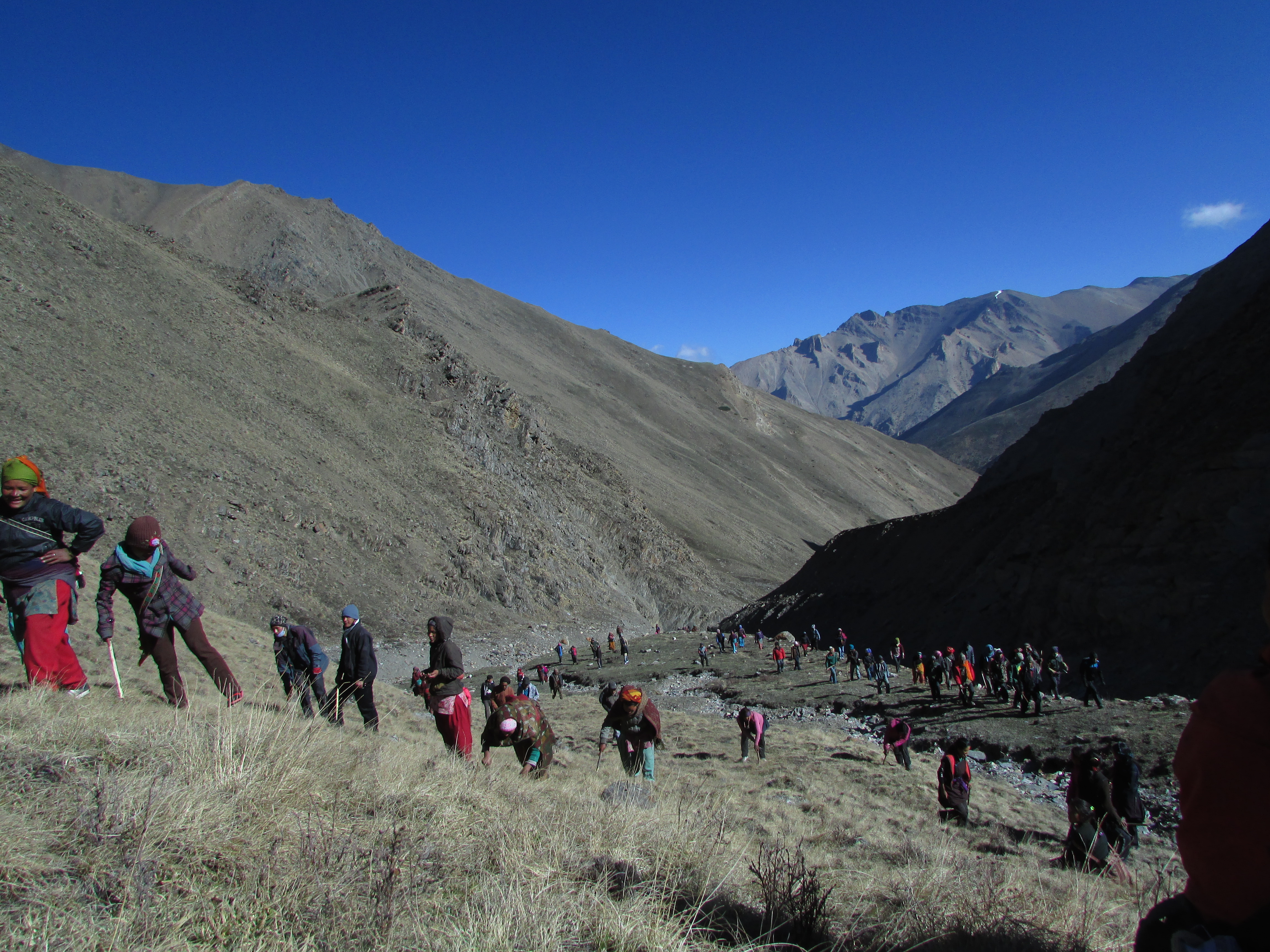

- Location within Karnali Province Location within Nepal
- Coordinates: 28°50′N 83°15′E
- Country: Nepal
- Province: Karnali Province
- District: Dolpa District

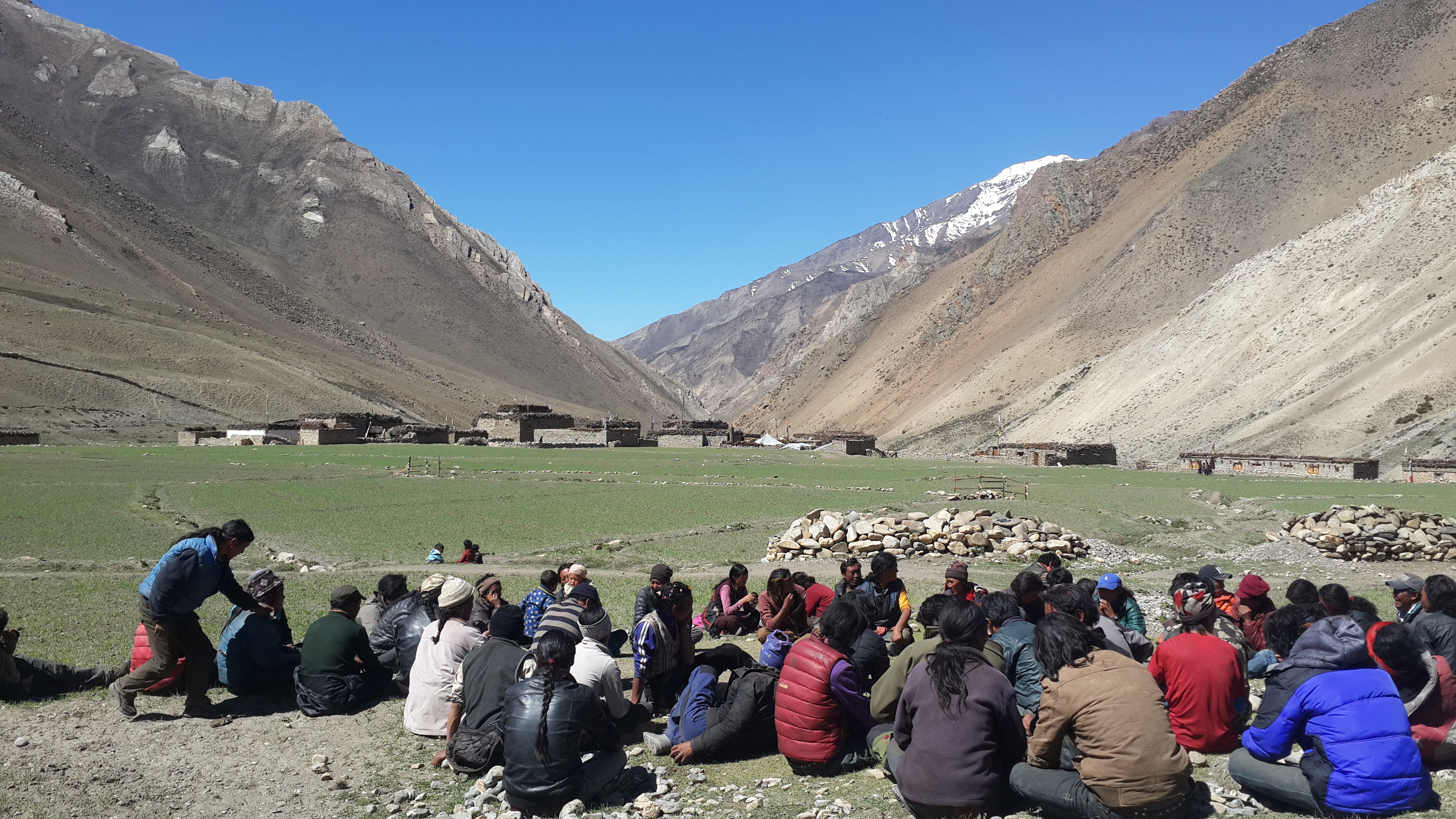
Local people in meeting in Dolpo

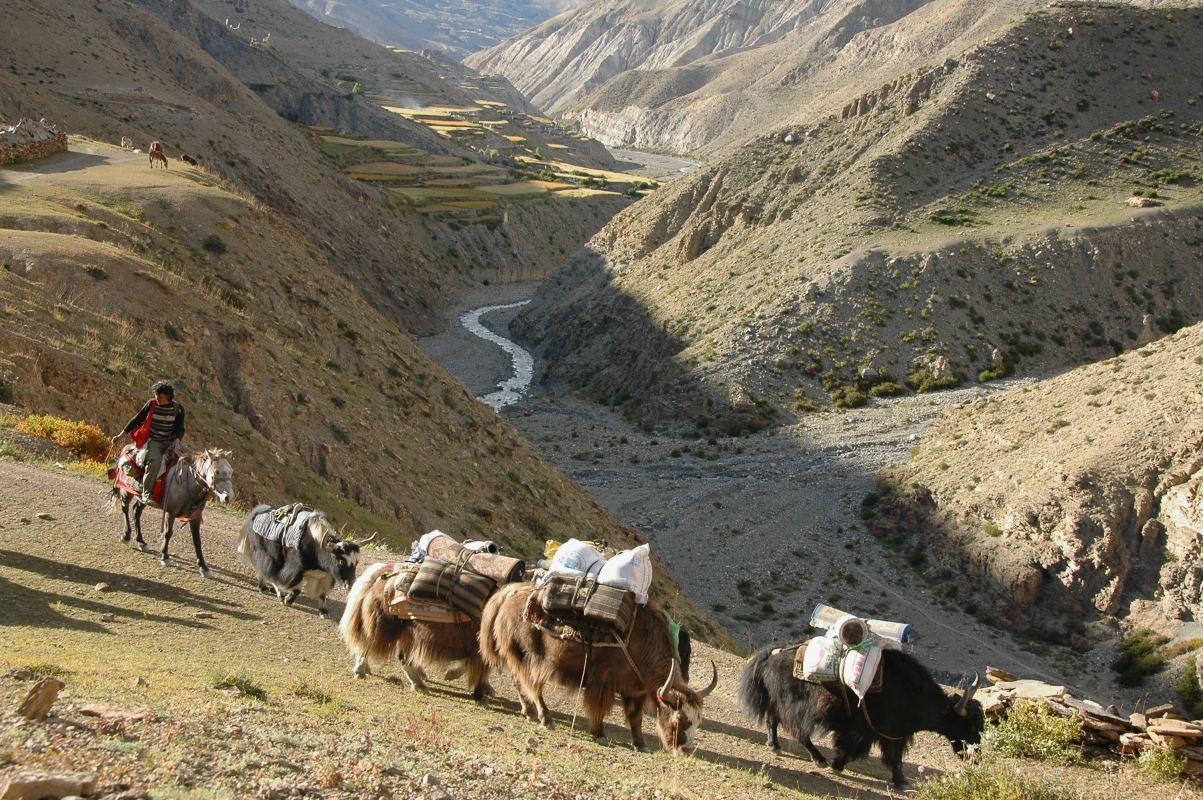
Yak caravan near Saldang in the northern part of Dolpo.

Dolpo (Standard Tibetan: དོལ་པོ) is a high-altitude culturally Tibetan region in the upper part of the Dolpa District of western Nepal, bordered in the north by Tibet. Part of the region lies in Shey Phoksundo National Park. The sparse, agro-pastoral population, known as Dolpo or Dolpopa in standard Tibetan and Dhol-wa in the local dialect, is connected to the rest of Nepal via Jufal airport, which can be reached in three days by horse. As the 2011 census, the population of Dolpo is estimated to be 36,700 with the majority of these people following Buddhism as their major religion.

The Dolpo are generally adherents of Bon, a religion whose origins predate Buddhism but whose modern form is officially accepted as a fifth school of Tibetan Buddhism. The remote region has preserved its Tibetan culture in relatively pure form, making it attractive to Westerners. Dolpa was the location for the 1999 Oscar-nominated film Himalaya and more recently for the German documentary Dolpo Tulku.

In spite of the near inaccessibility of the region and tourism restrictions for the more remote parts, Dolpa is a popular destination for trekking tourism.

== Geography ==
Dolpo is geologically part of the sedimentary Tibetan-Tethys zone. It is surrounded by Himalayan mountain chains including the Dhaulagiri (8,172 metres (26,811 ft)). These cloud barriers cause a semi-arid climate, with reported annual precipitations of less than 500 millimetres (20 in).

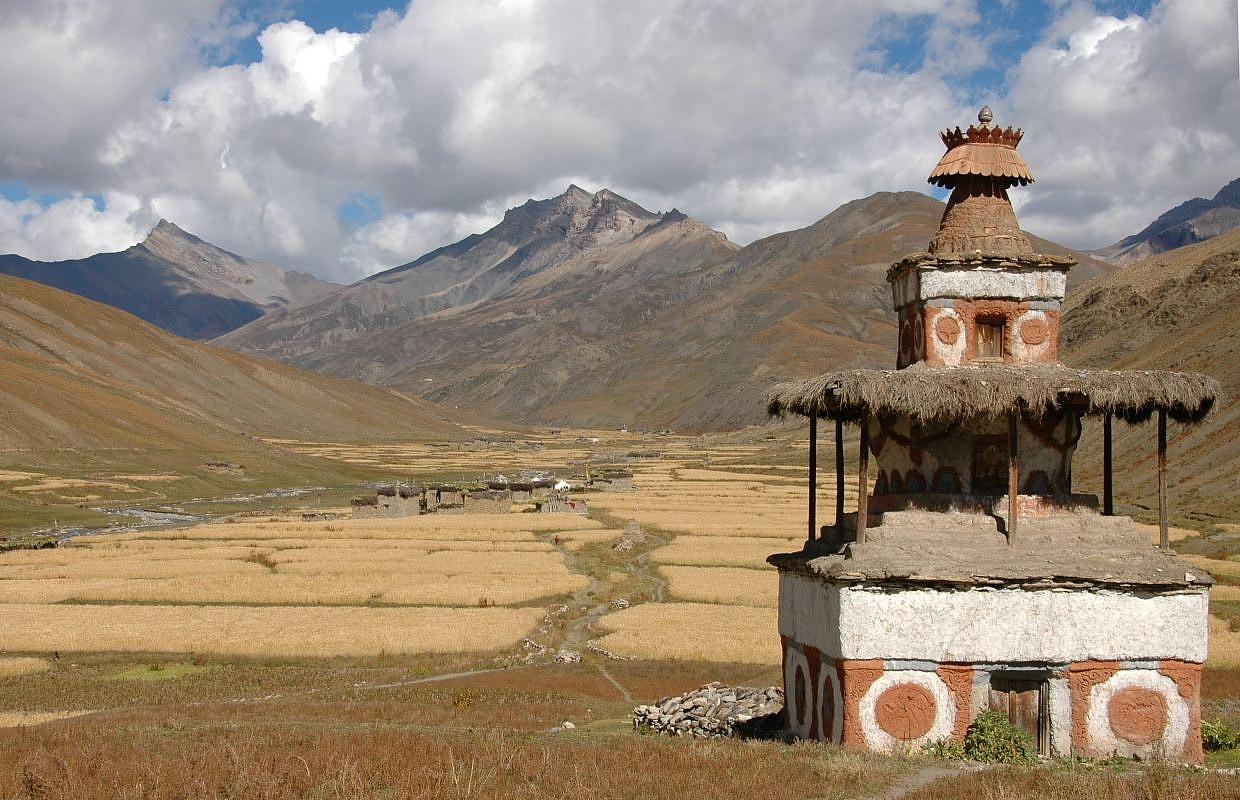
Chorten with barley fields; Tarap Valley in the southern part of Dolpa.

The region is historically divided into four valleys: Tsharka ("good growing-place"), Tarap ("auspicious excellent"), Panzang ("abode of monks"), and Nangkhong ("innermost place"). They constitute four of the seven village development committees (VDCs) that were created in 1975. The valleys south of the watershed drain into the Bheri River. The VDCs in this area are (roughly from east to west):

- Chharka (Tsharka Valley)
- Mukot
- Dho (Tarap Valley)
- Phoksundo.

The northern valleys between the watershed and Tibet drain westward by the Langu River, a tributary of the Karnali River via the Mugu Karnali. The VDCs in this area are:

- Tinje (Panzang Valley)
- Saldang (Nangkhong Valley)
- Bhijer.

Dolpo can be roughly divided into four valleys, each of which is represented since 1975 by a village development committee (VDC): Dho (Tarap Valley), Saldang (Nankhong Valley, the most populous), Tinje (Bentsang Valley), and Chharka (Tsharka Valley). There are also smaller VDCs at Bhijer, Mukot and Phoksundo.

Agriculture is possible at heights of 3,800 to 4,180 metres (12,470 to 13,710 ft) (villages of Shimen Bentsang Valley and Chharka, respectively) but often requires irrigation. Apart from barley, crops include buckwheat, millet, mustard, wheat, potatoes, radishes, and spinach. Similar to transhumance in the Alps, the population migrates between villages and high-lying (4,000 to 5,000 metres or 13,000 to 16,000 feet) summer pastures, in a lifestyle referred to as samadrok (roughly "farming nomads").

Dolpo makes up the greatest part of the area of the Dolpa District, but the district's population is concentrated in the lower southern parts, where also most of the VDCs are located.

== Trade ==
Local products are not sufficient to guarantee survival. The Dolpo traditionally trade salt from Tibet to the lower parts of Nepal, where they maintain netsang (literally "nesting place") relationships, first described by Kenneth M. Bauer in 2002. According to Bauer, each family in Dolpo has netsang partners in most villages of Dolpo District, a network that facilitates travel as well as trade. In return for salt, the netsang provide grain and shelter. The netsang partners trade with each other on preferential terms, based on family relations that may last for several generations. Recent changes such as the easy availability of salt from other regions and the closed border with Tibet have put the netsang system under pressure.

== History ==
Dolpo appears in historical records since c. 8th century. In the time from the 6th century to the 8th century the Tibetan Yarlung dynasty conquered most Tibetan-speaking territories. This seems to have caused a southward migration towards Dolpo and the peripheral areas along the upper Kali Gandaki River (Lo and Serib). In 842, Tibet fell apart, and Dolpa fell under the kingdom of Purang. Purang and Dolpa became temporarily part of the kingdom of Guge in the 10th century, but soon became separate again when King sKyid lde Nyi ma mgon divided Guge among his three sons.

During the reign of the Ya-rtse (a royal lineage generally accosiated with the Khasas) king A-sog-lde around 1253 both Dolpo and Serib were lost to the ruler of Gungthang, mGon po lde. The latter then reunited both the Dolpo and Serib and classified them among three provinces of mNga' ris. It is also known from historical documents that Mongolian troops reached Dolpo to conquer this province when they conquered many parts of Tibet and finally handed over the power to the ruler of the Sakya period.

In the 14th century Dolpo fell under its eastern neighbor the Kingdom of Lo, which controlled the trans-Himalayan trade route through the Kali Gandaki Gorge. The Dolpo had to pay tax and travel to Lo Monthang to provide manual labor.

For some time between the 15th century (1440?) and the 16th century, Dolpo was temporarily independent and ruled by a king from the Ra nag dynasty.

In 1769, the Gorkhas conquered Kathmandu and established the Kingdom of Nepal, which would soon reach more or less the country's modern extent. In 1789, Nepal swallowed the Lo kingdom and with it Dolpo. The kingdom's attempt to wrest nominal suzerainty over Tibet from China ended in a massive Chinese intervention that left Nepal paying tribute to China.

== The region in film ==
The 1999 French-Nepalese movie Himalaya, which gives insight into the local customs, was the first Nepalese film to be nominated for an Oscar award and also a huge success in Nepal itself, drawing the country's attention to the region. Kenneth M. Bauer notes that the film's authenticity was in large part artificial, as dialogues mixed the standard Tibetan of the professional actors with the villagers' local dialects and all external influences in the region (such as clothes, Maoists and tourists) were hidden. He also describes the impact which the film had on the region as an employer.

The 2009 documentary Dolpo Tulku accompanies Sherap Sangpo (born 1981 in the Tarap Valley) on his journey from India back to his home region and his first steps as a Buddhist spiritual leader of the Dolpa. At the age of ten, he had pilgrimaged to India and after meeting the Dalai Lama had decided to become a monk. In Ka-Nying Monastery in Kathmandu he was soon recognized as the reincarnation of Lama Nyinchung and sent to Namdroling Monastery in Karnataka. After 16 years in southern India his education was finished, and in 2008 he returned to his home region to take over the responsibilities of his predecessor as a Buddhist spiritual leader of the Dolpa and in particular the monasteries in Dho-Tarap, Namgung and Saldang.

== Notable people ==
- Orgyan Chokyi, hermitess
- Dolpopa Sherab Gyaltsen

== Bibliography ==
- Bauer, Kenneth M. (2002). "The cultural ecology of yak production in Dolpa, West Nepal". In Jianlin H.; Richard C.; Hanotte O.; McVeigh C.; Rege J.E.O. (eds.). Yak production in central Asian highlands. Proceedings of the Third International Congress on Yak held in Lhasa, P.R. China, 4–9 September 2000 (PDF). Nairobi: International Livestock Research Institute. pp. 87–94. Archived from the original on 5 March 2011.
- Bauer, Kenneth M. (2004). High frontiers : Dolpa and the changing world of Himalayan pastoralists. New York: Columbia University Press. ISBN 978-0-231-12390-7.
- Gurung, Phurwa (2022). "Governing caterpillar fungus: Participatory conservation as state-making, territorialization, and dispossession in Dolpo, Nepal." Environment and Planning E: Nature and Space 6 (3): 1745-1766.
- Gurung, Phurwa and Bauer, Ken. (2022). "Infrastructures of Change: Development among pastoralists in Dolpo, Nepal." In Jelle J.P. Wouters, Michael T. Heneise (eds.). Routledge Handbook of Highland Asia.
- Matthiessen, Peter (1978). The Snow Leopard. New York: Viking Press. ISBN 978-0-14-310551-0.
- Snellgrove, David L. (1967). Four Lamas of Dolpa: Tibetan Biographies. London: Bruno Cassirer. ISBN 978-0-85181-024-9.
- Schaeffer, Kurtis R. (2004). Himalayan Hermitess: The Life of a Tibetan Buddhist Nun. New York: Oxford University Press. ISBN 978-0-19-515299-9.
- Stearns, Cyrus (1999). The Buddha from Dolpa: A Study of the Life and Thought of the Tibetan Master Dolpa Sherab Gyaltsen. Albany: SUNY Press. ISBN 978-0-7914-4192-3.
- Pauler, Gerda (2015). Dolpo – People and Landscape. Sheffield: Vertebrate Graphics. ISBN 978-1-898573-96-8.
