= Tripurasundari, Dolpa =

Tripurasundari त्रिपुरासुंदरी
- Municipality
- Location in Nepal
- Coordinates: 29.03°N 82.85°E
- Country: Nepal
- Province: Karnali
- District: Dolpa
- No. of wards: 11
- Established: 10 March 2017

Government
  - Type: Mayor-council
  - Mayor: Mr. Jan chandra Rokaya (NCP)
  - Deputy mayor: Mrs. Devi Gharti (NCP)

Area
  - Total: 393.54 km^{2} (151.95 sq mi)
- Highest elevation: 5,000 m (16,000 ft)
- Lowest elevation: 2,000 m (6,600 ft)

Population (2011)
  - Total: 10,104
  - Density: 25.675/km^{2} (66.497/sq mi)
- Time zone: UTC+5:45 (NST)
- Website: official website

Tripurasundari (Nepali: त्रिपुरासुन्दरी) is an urban municipality located in Dolpa District of Karnali Province of Nepal.

The total area of the municipality is 393.54 square kilometres (151.95 sq mi) and the total population as of 2011 Nepal census is 10,104. The municipality is divided into 11 wards.

The municipality was established on 10 March 2017, when Government of Nepal restricted all old administrative structure and announced 744 local level units as per the new constitution of Nepal 2015.

Tripurakot, Sunhu, Lhan, Pahada and Likhu village development committees were incorporated to form this new municipality. The seat of the municipality is situated at Tripurakot.

== Demographics ==
At the time of the 2011 Nepal census, 55.8% of the population in Tripurasundari Municipality spoke Nepali, 22.3% Thangmi, 18.2% Newar, 2.6% Tamang, 0.6% Sherpa and 0.2% Maithili as their first language; 0.3% spoke other languages.

In terms of ethnicity/caste, 26.2% were Thami, 25.6% Newar, 25.4% Chhetri, 4.8% Hill Brahmin, 3.9% Kami, 3.8% Gurung, 2.7% Tamang, 2.1% Pahari, 1.7% Damai/Dholi and 3.8% others.

In terms of religion, 92.7% were Hindu, 3.3% Buddhist, 2.2% Christian and 1.8% Prakriti.
