= Dhan Bahadur Buda =

Nepalese politician

Dhan Bahadur Buda ( Dhanu)
- धन बहादुर बुढा (धनु )

Minister of Urban Development
- In office 6 March 2024 – 15 July 2024
- President: Ram Chandra Poudel
- Prime Minister: Pushpa Kamal Dahal
- Preceded by: Sita Gurung
- Succeeded by: Prakash Man Singh

Minister of State for Culture, Tourism and Civil Aviation
- In office 16 March 2018 – 20 November 2019
- President: Bidya Devi Bhandari
- Prime Minister: KP Sharma Oli
- Preceded by: Sumitra Tharuni
- Succeeded by: Sushila Sirpali Thakuri

Member of Parliament, Pratinidhi Sabha
- Incumbent
- Assumed office 4 March 2018
- Preceded by: Himself (as member of the Legislature Parliament)
- Constituency: Dolpa 1

Member of Constituent Assembly
- In office 21 January 2014 – 14 October 2017
- Preceded by: Ram Bahadur Bohara
- Succeeded by: Himself (as member of the House of Representatives)
- Constituency: Dolpa 1

Personal details
- Born: 19 February 1975 (age 51) Dolpa District
- Party: CPN (Unified Socialist)
- Other political affiliations: CPN (UML)
- Spouse: Himali Budha

Dhan Bahadur Buda is a Nepalese politician, belonging to the Communist Party of Nepal (Unified Socialist). In his hometown Buda is famously known as Dhanu who has won consecutively three times as member of house of representatives and served as the Minister of Urban Development of Nepal. He was a Minister of State for Culture, Tourism and Civil Aviation in Second Oli's cabinet from 2018 to 2019.

He is a member of the House of Representatives elected from Dolpa district, Parliamentary Constituency 1, in the 2017 election of the Federal Parliament.
