= Sarmie =

Sarmie may refer to:

- Sarmi, Nepal, a village
- sarmie, a South African English word for "sandwich"

== See also ==
- Sarmi (disambiguation)
