= Dolpo Buddha Rural Municipality =

Dolpo Buddha डोल्पो बुद्ध गाउँपालिका
- Rural Municipality
- Dolpo Buddha Rural Municipality
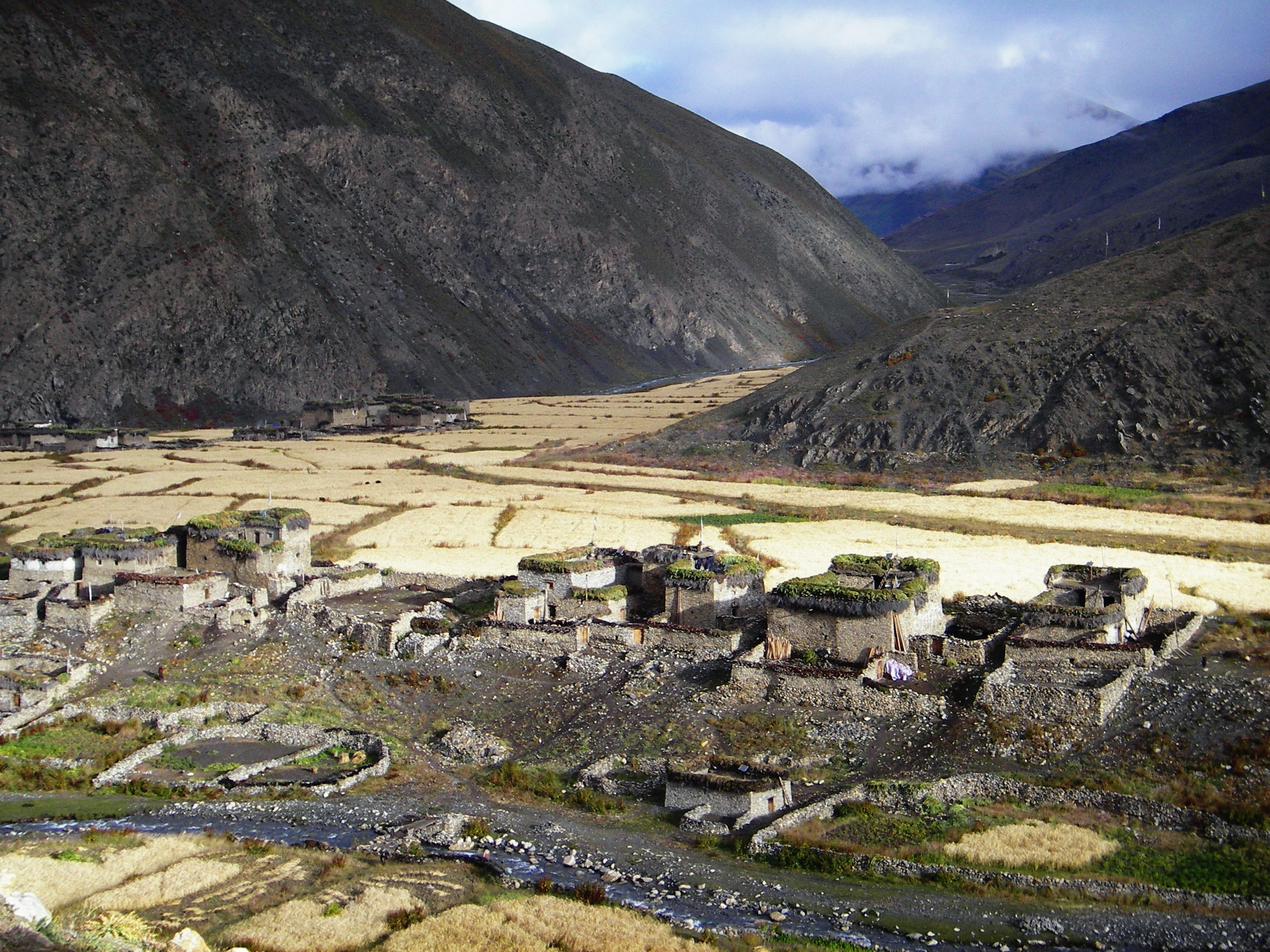
- Dho village, the headquarter of the rural municipality

- Location in Nepal
- Coordinates: 29.34°N 83.35°E
- Country: Nepal
- Province: Karnali Province
- District: Dolpa
- Wards: 6
- Established: 10 March 2017

Government
  - Type: Rural Council
  - Chairperson: कार्मा छोइवेल गुरुङ -(स्वतन्त्र)
  - Vice-chairperson: पेम्मा धोर्चे गुरुङ (नेकपा एकिकृत समाजवादी)

Area
  - Total: 377.38 km^{2} (145.71 sq mi)

Population (2021)
  - Total: 2,420
  - Density: 6.41/km^{2} (16.6/sq mi)
- Time zone: UTC+5:45 (NST)
- Headquarter: Dho
- Website: dolpobuddhamun.gov.np

Dolpo Buddha (Nepali: डोल्पो बुद्ध गाउँपालिका) is a rural municipality located in Dolpa District of Karnali Province of Nepal. The rural municipality was formed by combining two existing VDCs Dho and Tinje. The rural municipality is located in the Upper Dolpo region (also known as Bhot).

The rural municipality is divided into total 6 wards and the headquarter of the rural municipality is situated at Dho.

== Demographics ==
At the time of the 2011 Nepal census, 56.1% of the population in Dolpo Buddha Rural Municipality spoke Gurung, 41.9% Dolpali and 0.8% Kaike as their first language; 1.2% spoke other languages.

In terms of ethnicity/caste, 57.2% were Gurung, 41.3% Dolpo, 0.9% Magar and 0.6% others.

In terms of religion, 99.0% were Buddhist, 0.9% Hindu and 0.1% Christian.
