= Ringmo =

Ringmo रिङमो
- Location in Nepal
- Coordinates: 29°10′24″N 82°56′12″E
- Country: Nepal
- Province: Karnali Province
- District: Dolpa District
- Elevation: 3,660 m (12,010 ft)

Population
  - Total: 200
  - Religions: Bön
- Time zone: UTC+ 5:45

Ringmo is a traditional village in Dolpo in the Dolpa District of Nepal, with a seasonal population of about 200. The people are mostly of Tibetan ethnicity, are of the Bönpo faith, and engage in trade, yak herding and tourism. It sits on the landslide dam that formed Phoksundo Lake at about 3660 m (12,000 ft) above sea level. A Bön temple also named Ringmo can be found just outside the town, and the river that drains from Phoksundo plunges over a 167 m (548 ft) waterfall about half a kilometer south of the village.

Ringmo is the seat of the Phoksundo village development committee.

== Gallery ==
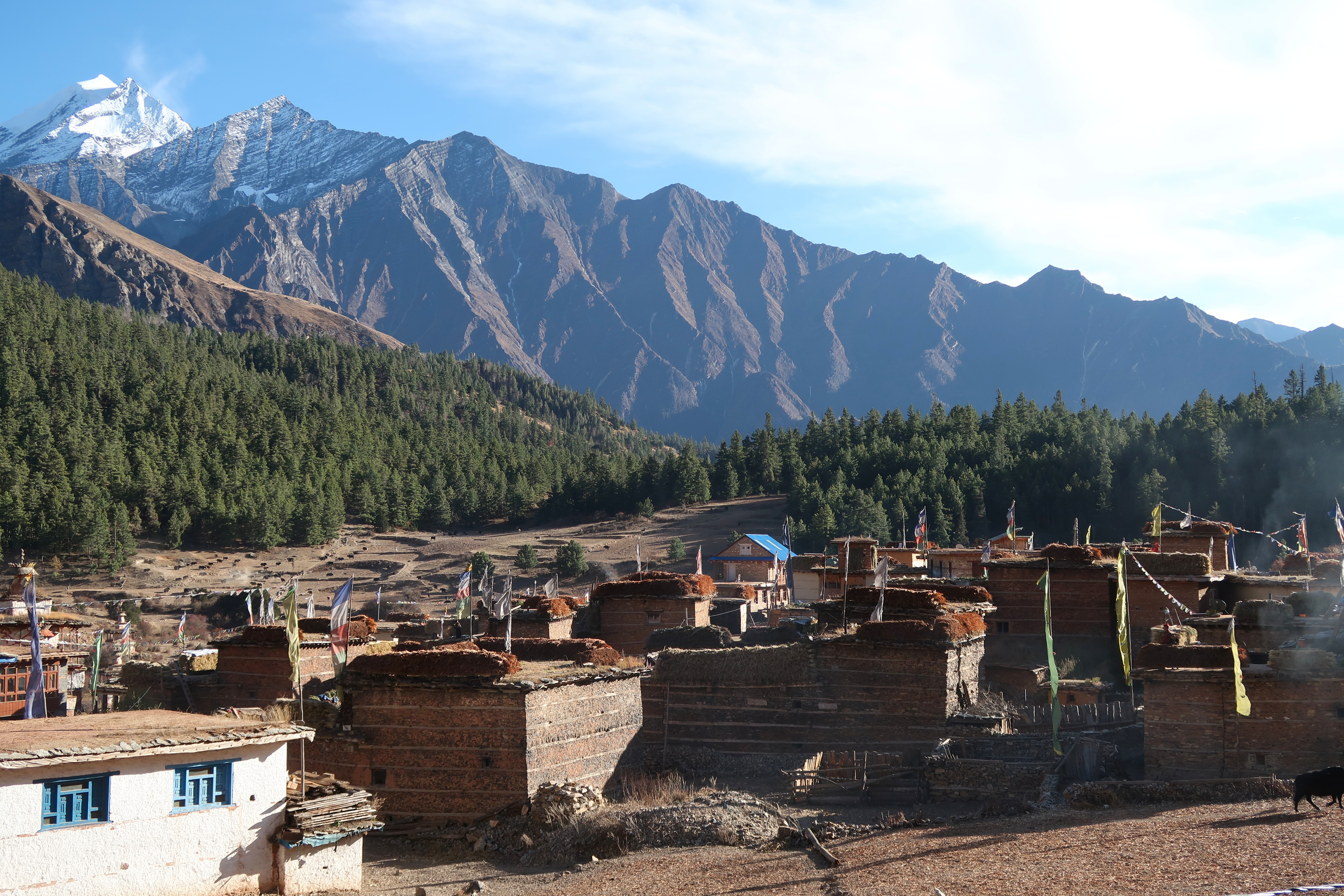
The village of Ringmo

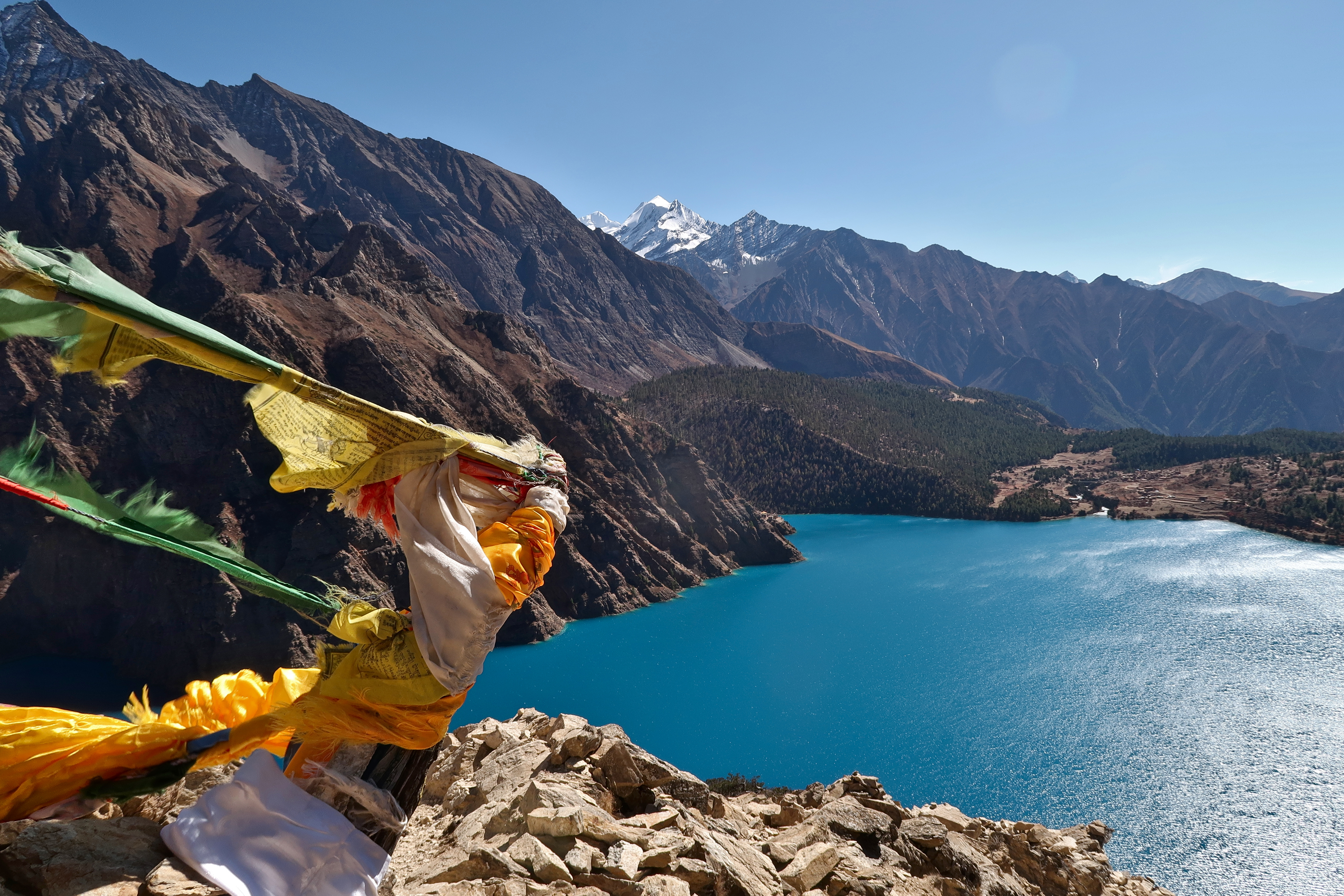
Ringmo seen from Phoksundo Lake

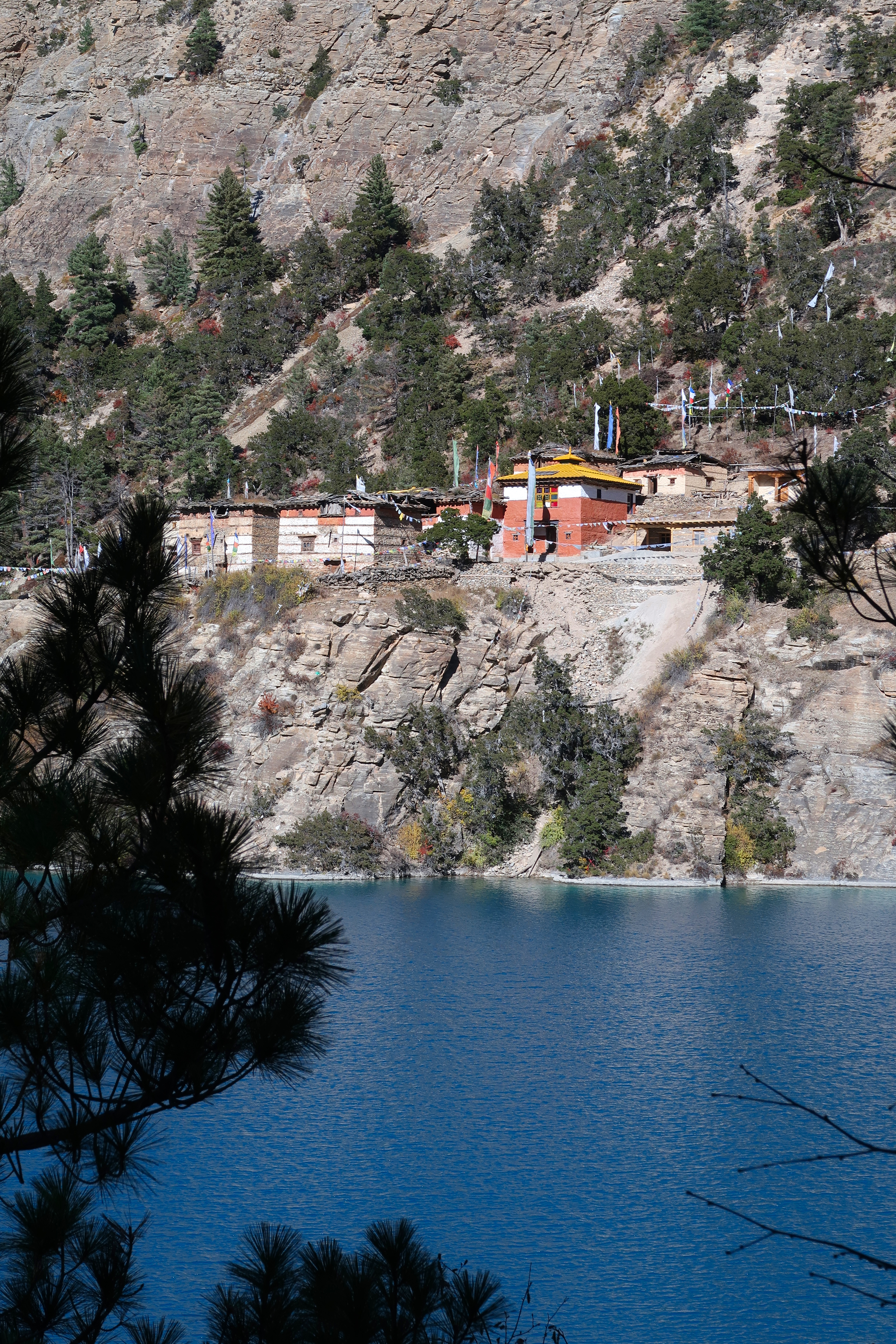
Bön Gompa of Ringmo

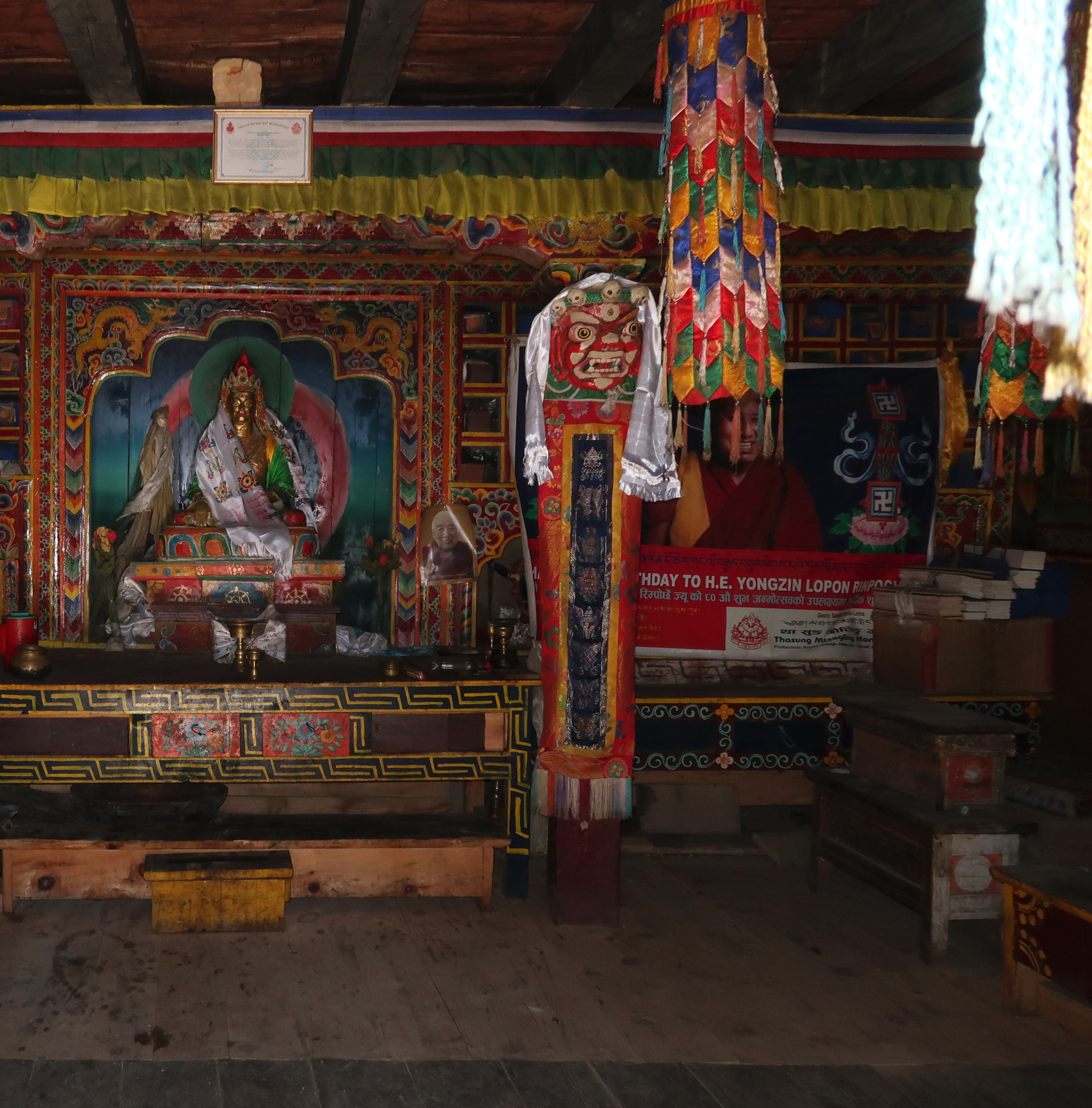
Inside the Bön Gompa of Ringmo

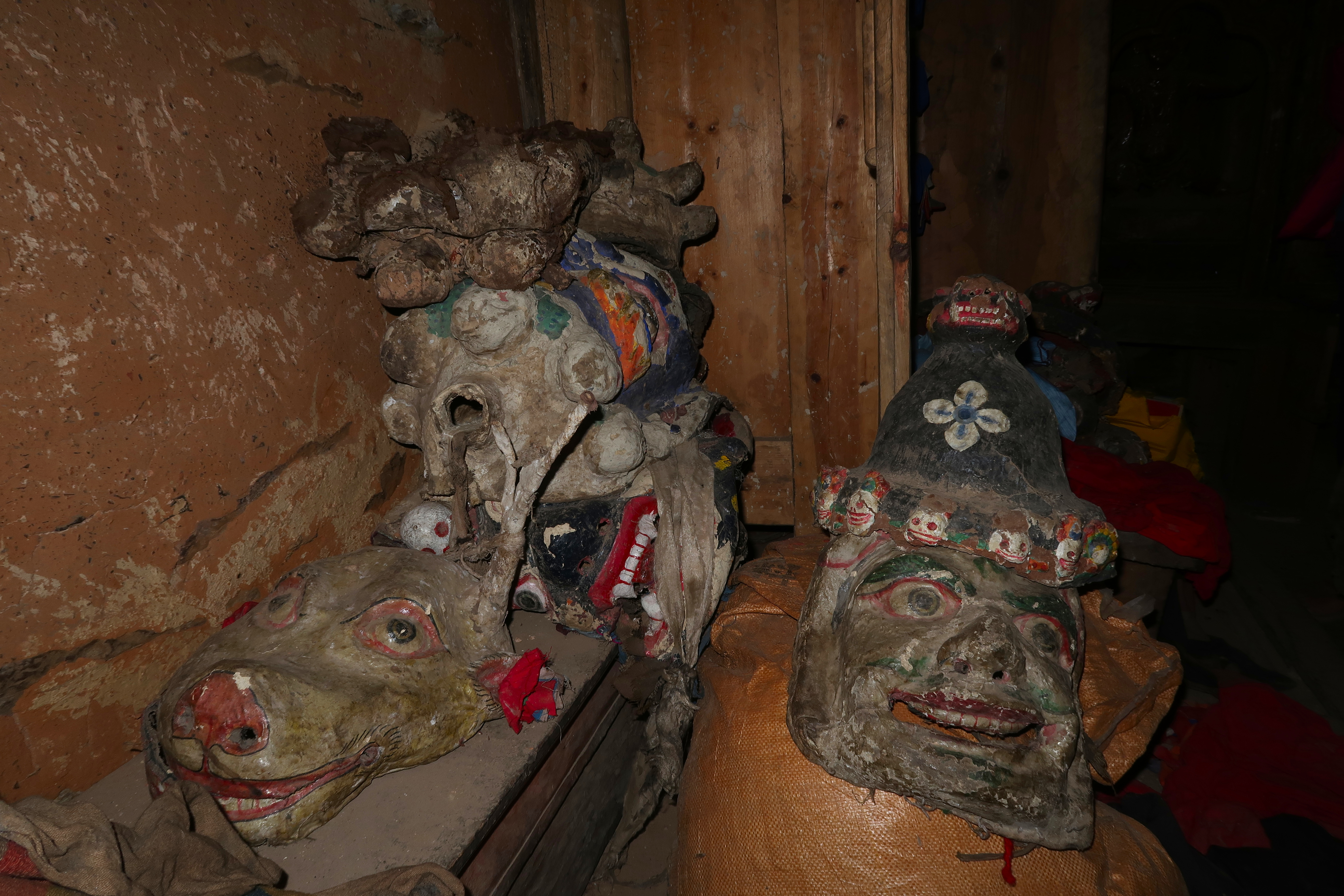
Dancing masks at the Bön Gompa of Ringmo
