= Thuli Bheri =

Thuli Bheri ठुली भेरी
- Municipality
- Location in Nepal
- Coordinates: 28.933333°N 82.9°E
- Country: Nepal
- Province: Karnali
- District: Dolpa
- No. of wards: 11
- Established: 10 March 2017

Government
  - Type: Mayor-council
  - Mayor: Mr. Subarna Kumar Budha (NCP)
  - Deputy mayor: Mrs. Chhiring Tolma Mahat (NCP)

Area
  - Total: 421.34 km^{2} (162.68 sq mi)

Population (2011)
  - Total: 8,370
  - Density: 19.9/km^{2} (51.5/sq mi)
- Time zone: UTC+5:45 (NST)
- Website: official website

Thuli Bheri (Nepali: ठुली भेरी) is an urban municipality located in Dolpa District of Karnali Province of Nepal. The district headquarter of Dolpa lies in Dunai, which is a village in the south-east of Thuli Beri.

The municipality's total area is 421.34 square kilometres (162.68 sq mi) and the total population, as of 2011 Nepal census, is 8,370. The municipality is divided into 11 wards.

== History ==
The municipality was established on 10 March 2017, when the Government of Nepal restricted all old administrative structure and announced 744 local level units as per the new Constitution of Nepal 2015.

Dunai, Majhphal, Juphal and Raha Village development committees were incorporated to form this new municipality. The headquarters of the municipality is situated at Dunai.

== Demographics ==
At the time of the 2011 Nepal census, 96.7% of the population in Thuli Bheri Municipality spoke Nepali, 0.8% Bote, 0.6% Magar, 0.6% Sherpa, 0.2% Maithili, 0.2% Gurung, 0.1% Tamang and 0.1% Urdu as their first language; 0.7% spoke other languages.

In terms of ethnicity/caste, 67.4% were Chhetri, 11.0% Thakuri, 9.5% Kami, 2.6% Hill Brahmin, 2.4% Sarki, 2.2% Magar, 1.8% Damai/Dholi, 0.9% Tamang, 0.7% Gurung and 1.5% others.

In terms of religion, 97.4% were Hindu, 2.4% Buddhist, 0.2% Muslim and 0.1% Christian.

== Transportation ==
Dolpa Airport lies Old-Juphal, in the north-west of the town and offers flights to Nepalgunj.

== Education ==
In education, there is the Dolpa Campus affiliated with Tribhuvan University, one high school: Sarswoti Higher Secondary School affiliated with HSEB, and the Dunai Community Library which is a community learning center.

== Healthcare ==
There is one hospital, the 15-bed Dolpa District Hospital.
