= Jagadulla Rural Municipality =

Rural Municipality in Karnali Province, Nepal

Jagadulla जगदुल्ला गाउँपालिका
- Rural Municipality
- Location in Nepal
- Coordinates: 29°03′N 82°33′E
- Country: Nepal
- Province: Karnali Province
- District: Dolpa
- Wards: 6
- Established: 10 March 2017

Government
  - Type: Rural Council
  - Chairperson: Mr.Narshingh Rokaya (NCP)
  - Vice-chairperson: Mrs.Amrita Lama (NCP)

Area
  - Total: 83.3 km^{2} (32.2 sq mi)

Population (2011)
  - Total: 2,273
  - Density: 27.3/km^{2} (70.7/sq mi)
- Time zone: UTC+5:45 (NST)
- Headquarter: majhgaun
- Website: jagdullamun.gov.np

Jagadulla (Nepali: जगदुल्ला गाउँपालिका) is a rural municipality located in Dolpa District of Karnali Province of Nepal.

The rural municipality is divided into total 6 wards and the headquarters of the rural municipality is situated at Majhagau.

== Demographics ==
At the time of the 2011 Nepal census, 89.4% of the population in Jagadulla Rural Municipality spoke Nepali, 9.2% Sherpa and 1.1% Tamang as their first language; 0.3% spoke other languages.

In terms of ethnicity/caste, 52.5% were Chhetri, 24.2% Kami, 9.3% Bhote, 5.2% Tamang, 4.2% Magar, 3.3% Thakuri, 1.0% Damai/Dholi and 0.3% others.

In terms of religion, 83.5% were Hindu and 16.5% Buddhist.
