= She Phoksundo Rural Municipality =

Rural Municipality in Karnali Province, Nepal

She Phoksundo शे फोक्सुण्डो गाउँपालिका
- Rural Municipality
- Location in Nepal
- Coordinates: 29.42°N 83.09°E
- Country: Nepal
- Province: Karnali Province
- District: Dolpa
- Wards: 9
- Established: 10 March 2017

Government
  - Type: Rural Council
  - Chairperson: Mr.Tashi Tunduk Gurung (NCP)
  - Vice-chairperson: Mr.Dawa Sanduk Gurung -Independent

Area
  - Total: 123.07 km^{2} (47.52 sq mi)

Population (2011)
  - Total: 3,099
  - Density: 25.18/km^{2} (65.22/sq mi)
- Time zone: UTC+5:45 (NST)
- Headquarter: Saldang
- Website: shephoksundomun.gov.np

She Phoksundo (Nepali: शे फोक्सुण्डो गाउँपालिका) is a rural municipality located in Dolpa District of Karnali Province of Nepal.

The rural municipality is divided into a total of nine wards. The headquarters of the rural municipality is situated at Saldang.

== Geography ==
It is situated at coordinates of 29° 20' 00" N to 29° 51' 00" N Latitudes and 82° 89' 00" E to 83° 09' 00" E of Longitudes. The lowest elevation is 2300m and the highest elevation is 7,425m below sea level.

Shey Phoksundo Gaunpalika was incorporated on 10 March 2017 (Falgun 27, 2073 BS) fulfilling the requirement of the Constitution of Nepal 2015 (2072 BS). Ministry of Federal Affairs and General Administration (MoFAGA) replaced all old VDCs and Municipalities into 753 new local level bodies. Saldang, Bhijer, and Phoksundo Village development committees (VDCs) were incorporated to form this Gaunpalika. The name of this Gaunpalika was enrolled by the name of Shey Phoksundo Lake.

== Demographics ==
At the time of the 2011 Nepal census, 56.7% of the population in She Phoksundo Rural Municipality spoke Sherpa, 23.3% Kham, 17.6% Gurung, 1.4% Nepali and 0.6% Tamang as their first language; 0.4% spoke other languages.

In terms of ethnicity/caste, 76.7% were Dolpo, 17.8% Gurung, 2.9% Tamang, 0.9% Bhote, 0.4% Chhetri, 0.4% Magar and 0.9% others.

In terms of religion, 97.1% were Buddhist, 2.5% Hindu and 0.4% Bon.
