= Dolpa 1 =

Parliamentary constituency in Nepal

- Parliamentary constituency for the House of Representatives
- Dolpa 1 in Karnali Province

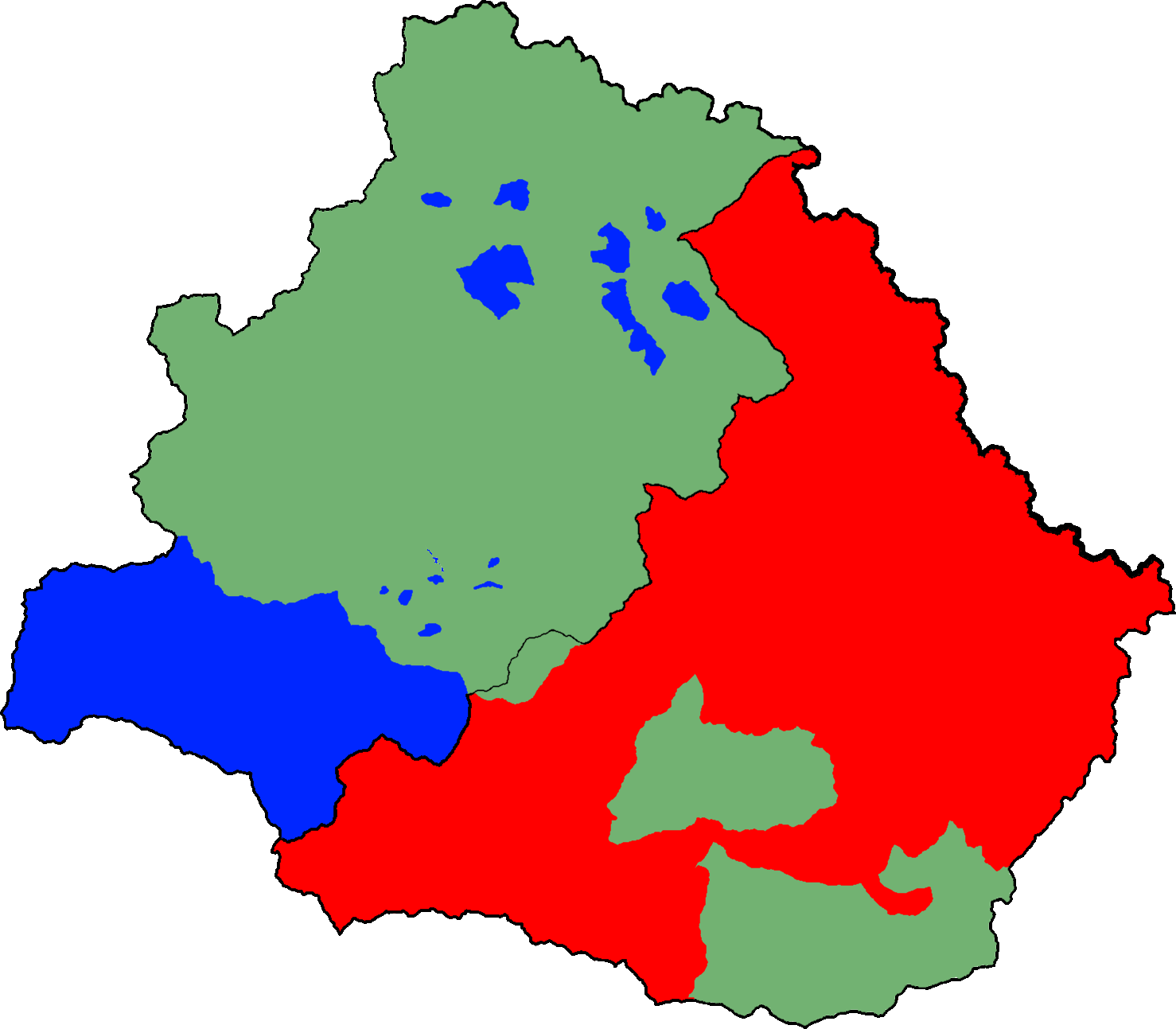
- Assembly segments Dolpa 1(A) (red) and Dolpa 1(B) (blue) within Dolpa District. Protected areas in green
- Province: Karnali Province
- District: Dolpa District
- Electorate: 18,989

Current constituency
- Created: 1991
- Number of members: 3
- Member of Parliament: Dhan Bahadur Buda, Unified Socialist
- Karnali MPA 1(A): Sher Bahadur Budha, Maoist Centre
- Karnali MPA 1(B): Bir Bahadur Shahi, Maoist Centre

Dolpa 1 is the parliamentary constituency of Dolpa District in Nepal. This constituency came into existence on the Constituency Delimitation Commission (CDC) report submitted on 31 August 2017.

== Incorporated areas ==
Dolpa 1 incorporates the entirety of Dolpa District.

== Assembly segments ==
It encompasses the following Karnali Provincial Assembly segment

- Dolpa 1(A)
- Dolpa 1(B)

== Members of Parliament ==
=== Parliament/Constituent Assembly ===
Election	Member	Party
1991	Kyabu Budha	Nepali Congress
1994	Moti Prasad Pahadi	Independent
1999	Nar Bahadur Budhathoki	CPN (UML)
2008	Ram Bahadur Bohara	CPN (Maoist)
January 2009	Ram Bahadur Bohara	UCPN (Maoist)
2013	Dhan Bahadur Budha	CPN (UML)
May 2018	Dhan Bahadur Budha	Nepal Communist Party
March 2021	Dhan Bahadur Budha	CPN (UML)
August 2021	Dhan Bahadur Budha	CPN (Unified Socialist)

=== Provincial Assembly ===
==== 1(A) ====
Election	Member	Party
2017	Nanda Singh Budha	CPN (UML)
May 2018	Nanda Singh Budha	Nepal Communist Party
March 2021	Nanda Singh Budha	CPN (UML)
2022	Sher Bahadur Budha	CPN (UML)

==== 1(B) ====
Election	Member	Party
2017	Bir Bahadur Shahi	CPN (Maoist Centre)
May 2018	Bir Bahadur Shahi	Nepal Communist Party
March 2021	Bir Bahadur Shahi	CPN (Maoist Centre)

== Election results ==
=== Election in the 2020s ===
==== 2022 general election ====
Candidate	Party	Votes	%
Dhan Bahadur Buda	CPN (Unified Socialist)	11,292	64.45
Ganesh Bahaudur Shahi	CPN (UML)	5,505	31.42
Others		724	4.13
Total		17,521	100.00
Majority		5,787	
CPN (Unified Socialist) hold			
Source: Election Commission

==== 2022 provincial election ====
===== 1(A) =====
Candidate	Party	Votes	%
Sher Bahadur Budha	CPN (UML)	4,743	64.48
Dipendra Bahadur Shahi	Nepali Congress	2,465	33.51
Others		148	2.01
Total		7,356	100.00
Majority		2,278	
CPN (UML) hold			
Source: Election Commission

===== 1(B) =====
Candidate	Party	Votes	%
Bir Bahadur Shahi	CPN (Maoist Centre)	5,295	52.02
Dhan Chandra Baiji	CPN (UML)	4,595	45.14
Others		289	2.84
Total		10,179	100.00
Majority		700	
CPN (Maoist Centre) hold			
Source: Election Commission

=== Election in the 2010s ===
==== 2017 general election ====
Candidate	Party	Votes	%
Dhan Bahadur Budha	CPN (UML)	11,761	77.13
Aanga Kumar Budha	Nepali Congress	3,167	20.77
Harka Bahadur Thakulla	CPN (Marxist–Leninist)	299	1.96
Arjun Bahadur Shahi	Rastriya Janamukti Party	22	0.14
Total		15,249	100.00
Valid votes		15,249	96.45
Invalid/blank votes		561	3.55
Total votes		15,810	100.00
Registered voters/turnout		18,989	83.26
Majority		8,594	
CPN (UML) hold			
Source: Election Commission

==== 2017 provincial election ====
===== 1(A) =====
Candidate	Party	Votes	%
Nanda Singh Budha	CPN (UML)	5,490	81.90
Begam Singh Thakuri	Nepali Congress	1,213	18.10
Total		6,703	100.00
Valid votes		6,703	98.75
Invalid/blank votes		85	1.25
Total votes		6,788	100.00
Registered voters/turnout		8,250	82.28
Majority		4,277	
CPN (UML) gain			
Source: Election Commission

===== 1(B) =====
Candidate	Party	Votes	%
Bir Bahadur Shahi	CPN (Maoist Centre)	6,414	73.31
Suresh Bahdur Shahi	Nepali Congress	2,105	24.06
Pushpa Raj Budha	Naya Shakti Party	140	1.60
Jay Bahadur Dasal	Independent	90	1.03
Total		8,749	100.00
Valid votes		8,749	96.94
Invalid/blank votes		276	3.06
Total votes		9,025	100.00
Registered voters/turnout		10,739	84.04
Majority		4,309	
CPN (Maoist Centre) gain			
Source: Election Commission

==== 2013 Constituent Assembly election ====
Candidate	Party	Votes	%
Dhan Bahadur Buda	CPN (UML)	6,987	51.09
Satya Pahadi	UCPN (Maoist)	2,774	20.28
Angad Kumar Budha	Independent	1,501	10.98
Suresh Bahadur Shahi	Nepali Congress	974	7.12
Others		1,440	10.53
Total		13,676	100.00
Valid votes		13,676	96.94
Invalid/blank votes		431	3.06
Total votes		14,107	100.00
Registered voters/turnout		14,860	94.93
Majority		4,213	
CPN (UML) gain			
Source: Election Commission

=== Election in the 2000s ===
==== 2008 Constituent Assembly election ====
Candidate	Party	Votes	%
Ram Bahadur Bohara	CPN (Maoist)	9,723	58.06
Karna Bahadur Budha	Rastriya Prajatantra Party	3,427	20.46
Om Bahadur Budha	CPN (UML)	1,978	11.81
Dil Bahadur Bista	Nepali Congress	1,440	8.60
Others		178	1.06
Total		16,746	100.00
Valid votes		16,746	95.57
Invalid/blank votes		776	4.43
Total votes		17,522	100.00
Registered voters/turnout		21,932	79.89
Majority		6,296	
CPN (Maoist) gain			
Source: Election Commission

=== Election in the 1990s ===
==== 1999 general election ====
Candidate	Party	Votes	%
Nar Bahadur Budhathoki	CPN (UML)	8,371	57.82
Karna Bahadur Budha	Independent	4,567	31.54
Laxmi Narayan Neupane	Nepali Congress	915	6.32
Others		625	4.32
Total		14,478	100.00
Valid votes		14,478	97.78
Invalid/blank votes		329	2.22
Total votes		14,807	100.00
Registered voters/turnout		18,659	79.36
Majority		3,804	
CPN (UML) gain			
Source: Election Commission

==== 1994 general election ====
Candidate	Party	Votes	%
Moti Prasad Pahadi	Independent	6,424	46.07
Karna Bahadur Budha	Rastriya Prajatantra Party	6,123	43.91
Others		1,397	10.02
Total		13,944	100.00
Majority		301	
Independent gain			
Source: Election Commission

==== 1991 general election ====
Candidate	Party	Votes	%
Kyabu Budha	Nepali Congress	7,462	62.10
-	Rastriya Prajatantra Party (Chand)	4,555	37.90
Total		12,017	100.00
Majority		2,907	
Nepali Congress gain			

== See also ==
- List of parliamentary constituencies of Nepal
