= Chhetrapa =

Kshetrapa Chhetrapa
- Village Development Committee
- Location of Kshetrapa Village of Nepal.
- Coordinates: 27.67°N 86.15°E
- Country: Nepal
- Zone: Janakpur Zone
- District: Dolakha District

Population (2011)
  - Total: 2,447
- Time zone: UTC+5:45 (Nepal Time)

Kshetrapa (Nepali: क्षेत्रपा) is a village development committee in north-eastern Nepal. As per the 2011 National Population and Housing Census, Kshetrapa had 2,447 (1,116 male and 1,331 female) people living in 580 individual households. Kshetrapa has one high school, Shree Kshetrawati Higher Secondary School, which is located at Peepal Daada, Majhgaun. Namdu Jugu Road, which runs through the village, is under construction as of 2020.

A seasonal bus service is available from Kathmandu, around 170 km (approximately 105 miles) away. The majority of the native population are of Jirel, Chettris, and Newar ethnic groups.

The original trailhead of all early Everest expeditions began at Kathmandu and passed through Kshetrapa; this is an alternative to the other route, which connect at Yarsa, Kavre, through Kiratichhap and heads to Jiri.

== Villages ==
The following is a list of areas or sub-villages cities of Kshetrapa Village Development Committee:

- Bhaankharka
- Toriswaraa
- Yebbo
- Soluphuli
- Toridanda
- Thapagaun
- Daardok
- Dharmashala
- Byaarok
- Bagang
- Paattle
- Pipsul
- Pokhari Parri
- Majhgaun
- Tengithoke
- Pharthoke
- Waithoke
- Khulchi
- Peepal Danda
- Gechugaa
- Tiltapsha
- Gairaghar
- Pakhaghar
- Chhipigaun
- Kshetrapa
- Wollo Baseri
- Pallo Baseri
- Bethiswaraa
- Pukti
