= Chharka Tangsong Rural Municipality =

Chharka Tangsong छार्का ताङसोङ गाउँपालिका
- Rural Municipality
- Location in Nepal
- Coordinates: 29.07°N 83.45°E
- Country: Nepal
- Province: Karnali Province
- District: Dolpa
- Wards: 6
- Established: 10 March 2017

Government
  - Type: Rural Council
  - Chairperson: Mr. Shenang Gurung
  - Vice-chairperson: Chhiring Dihik Gurung

Area
  - Total: 345.57 km^{2} (133.43 sq mi)

Population (2011)
  - Total: 1,451
  - Density: 4.199/km^{2} (10.87/sq mi)
- Time zone: UTC+5:45 (NST)
- Headquarter: Chharka
- Website: chharkatangsongmun.gov.np

Chharka Tangsong (Nepali: छार्का ताङसोङ गाउँपालिका) is a rural municipality located in Dolpa District of Karnali Province of Nepal.

The rural municipality is divided into total 6 wards and the headquarters of the rural municipality is situated at Chharka.

== Demographics ==
At the time of the 2011 Nepal census, 49.8% of the population in Chharka Tangsong Rural Municipality spoke Dolpali, 34.3% Gurung, 9.7% Magar and 5.7% Sherpa as their first language; 0.5% spoke other languages.

In terms of ethnicity/caste, 55.5% were Dolpo, 34.3% Gurung, 9.9% Magar and 0.3% others.

In terms of religion, 99.5% were Buddhist, 0.5% Hindu and 0.1% Christian.
