= Khadang =

Lhan ल्हाँ
- Municipality
- Country: Nepal
- Zone: Karnali Zone
- District: Dolpa District

Population (1991)
  - Total: 820
- Time zone: UTC+5:45 (Nepal Time)

Khadang is a village development committee in Dolpa District in the Karnali Zone of north-western Nepal. At the time of the 1991 Nepal census it had a population of 820 persons living in 144 individual households.
