= Dunai, Nepal =

Dunai दुनै
- Village of Thuli Bheri Municipality and Hill Station
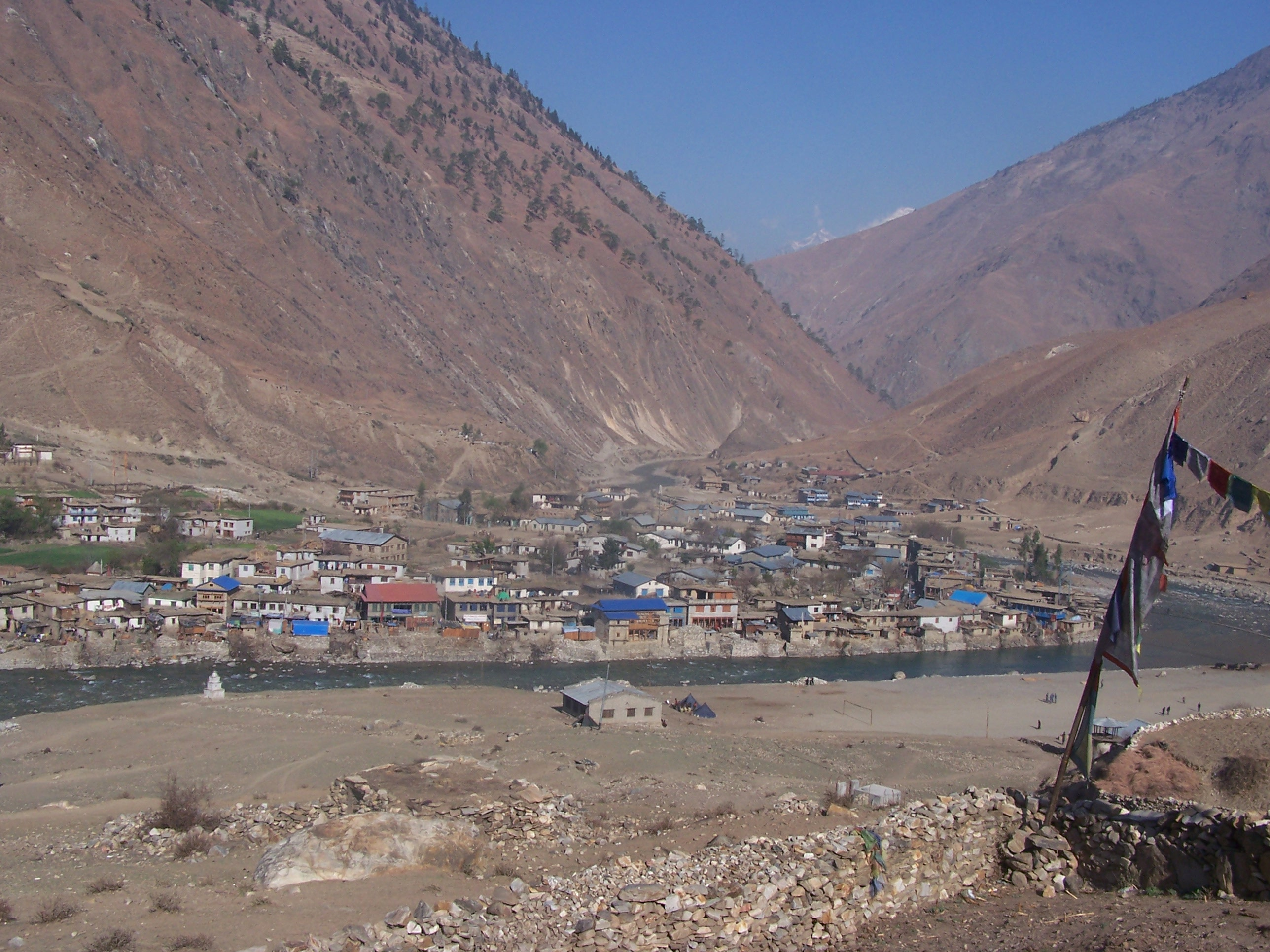
- Dunai, Dolpa, Nepal

- Location in Nepal
- Coordinates: 28°56′N 82°54′E
- Country: Nepal
- Province: Karnali Province
- District: Dolpa District
- Elevation: 2,000 m (6,600 ft)

Population (1991)
  - Total: 1,773
- Time zone: UTC+5:45 (NST)
- Climate: Cwb

Dunai is a village and former Village Development Committee that is now part of Thuli Bheri Municipality in Nepal. Dunai is also the district headquarters of Dolpa District. The town on the banks of the Thuli Bheri River resides at about 2,000 metres (6,562 ft) elevation.

The 1991 Nepal census counted 1,773 persons in 334 households.

== Transportation ==
Dolpa Airport lies in Juphal, another village of Thuli Bheri and offers flights to Nepalgunj.

== Education ==
In education, there is the Dolpa Campus affiliated with Tribhuvan University, one high school: Sarswoti Higher Secondary School affiliated with HSEB, and the Dunai Community Library which is a community learning center.

== Healthcare ==
There is one hospital: the 15-bed Dolpa District Hospital.

== Media ==
Dunai has one FM radio station: Radio Dolpa 101.4 MHz which is a community radio station.
