= Mudkechula Rural Municipality =

Mudkechula मुड्केचुला गाउँपालिका
- Rural Municipality
- Location in Nepal
- Coordinates: 29.07°N 82.55°E
- Country: Nepal
- Province: Karnali Province
- District: Dolpa
- Wards: 9
- Established: 10 March 2017

Government
  - Type: Rural Council
  - Chairperson: Mr. Datta Bahadur Shahi (NCP)
  - Vice-chairperson: Mrs. Sabita Rokaya (NCP)

Area
  - Total: 250.08 km^{2} (96.56 sq mi)

Population (2011)
  - Total: 5,129
  - Density: 20.51/km^{2} (53.12/sq mi)
- Time zone: UTC+5:45 (NST)
- Headquarter: Narku
- Website: mudkechulamun.gov.np

Mudkechula (Nepali: मुड्केचुला गाउँपालिका) is a rural municipality located in Dolpa District of Karnali Province of Nepal.

The rural municipality is divided into total 9 wards and the headquarters of the rural municipality is situated at Narku.

== Demographics ==
At the time of the 2011 Nepal census, 99.6% of the population in Mudkechula Rural Municipality spoke Nepali and 0.4% Sign language as their first language.

In terms of ethnicity/caste, 53.1% were Chhetri, 18.3% Thakuri, 11.2% Kami, 10.3% Sarki, 4.2% Damai/Dholi, 2.3% Magar, 0.3% other Dalit and 0.3% others.

In terms of religion, 99.8% were Hindu and 0.2% Christian.
