= Raha =

Raha may refer to:

- Raha Assembly constituency of Assam, India
- Raha, Assam, a village in India
- Raha, Muna, capital of Muna Regency, Southeast Sulawesi, Indonesia
- Raha, Nepal, a village in Dolpa district
- Rāḥa (Arabic: راحة), a common Arabic name for Turkish delight.
- Rahā (Arabic: رها, the Arabic name of Edessa
