= Sengli Co =

Freshwater Alpine lake in Tibet, China

- Senlicuo
- སེང་ལི་མཚོ། (Standard Tibetan)
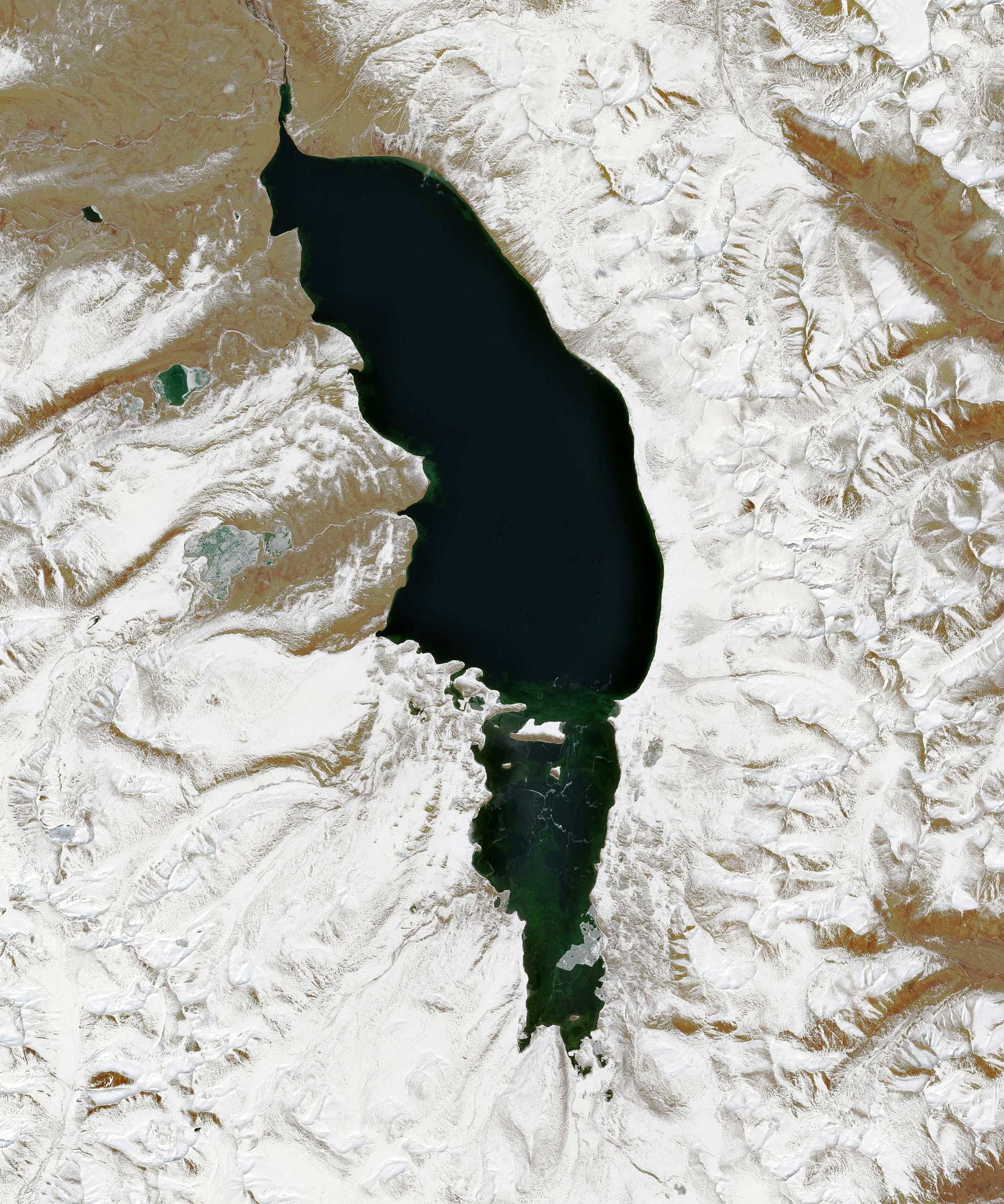
- Sentinel-2 image (2022)

- Location within Tibet
- Location: Zhongba County, Shigatse, Tibet, China
- Coordinates: 30°25′09.66″N 84°04′08.15″E
- Surface area: 78 km^{2} (30 sq mi)
- Surface elevation: 5,386 m (17,671 ft)
- Frozen: Winter

Sengli Co or Senlicuo (pinyin: senli cuò) or Sengli Tso (Tibetan: སེང་ལི་མཚོ།, Wylie: seng li mtsho, THL: Sengli Tso) is a freshwater alpine lake of Zhongba County, Shigatse in Southern Tibet, China.

== Location ==
The lake's elevation is 5,386 m (17,671 ft) above sea level, with a total surface area of 78 km^{2}. Its water runs north to south through Laiwuzangbo before entering Dangquezangbo (Maquan River) in the Yarlung Zangbo River's upper sections.

It lies to the northwest of Buduo Town and southwest of Jima Town, about 70 kilometres (43 mi) northeast of Payang Town.
