= Tichurong language =

Sino-Tibetan language

Tichurong
- Native to: Nepal
- Region: Karnali Province
- Ethnicity: Magars
- Native speakers: 2,700 (2019)
- Language family: Sino-Tibetan: Tibeto-Burman?; Tibeto-Kanauri?; Bodish; Tibetic; Central Tibetic; Dolpo–Tichurong; Tichurong
- Writing system: None

Language codes
- ISO 639-3: tcn
- Glottolog: tich1238

Tichurong or Tichyurong, also known as Tichurongke, is a Sino-Tibetan language spoken by the Magar people in the Tichurong valley of Karnali Province, specifically in the Dolpa district, in western Nepal.

== Name ==
The word "Tichurong", according to Tichurong-speaking communities, is derived from the elements ti 'valuable', chu 'water', and rong 'valley'. Other segmentations of the term derive it from the place name Tiserong, which in turn originates from Tise 'Mount Kailash' and rong.

== Demographics ==
It is spoken in the villages of Gumbatara, Gufa, Rukha, Kola, Tachin, Khani, Khani Gumba, Namdel, Baijibara, Syala, Vyas, Banthada, Chilpara, Dharapani and Lawan; the largest of the villages is Gumbatara. As of 2019, the language was spoken by around 2,700 individuals. The Magar people speak three other languages distinct from Tichurong, Kham, Kaike, and Dhut. According to Jag Bahadur Budha, the primary age groups speaking Tichurong are people over 50 and below 14. These people more commonly live in the valley; schooling is available in it, in which students speak Nepali but continue using Tichurong in home settings. Tichurong is not written, and Nepali is used by literate people in the valley for writing.

== Phonology ==
=== Consonants ===
35 consonants are contrastive in Tichurong.

=== Vowels ===
Six "major" vowels, six nasal vowels, and six long vowels are phonemic in Tichurong.

=== Tone ===
Tichurong is a tonal language.

== Morphosyntax ==
=== Verb ===
Verbal morphology in Tichurong is simple; verbs in Tichurong do not have verbal agreement with person or number.

=== Alignment ===
Tichurong is an ergative–absolutive language.
