= Kalika, Dolpa =

Kalika कालिका
- Municipality
- Location in Nepal
- Coordinates: 29.02°N 82.58°E
- Country: Nepal
- Zone: Karnali Zone
- District: Dolpa District

Population (1991)
  - Total: 902
- Time zone: UTC+5:45 (Nepal Time)

Kalika is a village development committee in Dolpa District in the Karnali Zone of north-western Nepal. At the time of the 1991 Nepal census it had a population of 902 persons living in 157 individual households.
