= Sarmi =

Sarmi may refer to:

== Places ==
- Sarmi, Indonesia, a town in Papua, Indonesia
- Sarmi Regency, an administrative unit in Papua, Indonesia
- Sarmi, Nepal, a village in Nepal

== People ==
- Massimo Sarmi (born 1948), Italian businessman
- Count Ferdinando Sarmi (born 1912), Italian-born American fashion designer and businessman
- Hilal Al Sarmi (born 1978), Omani politician
