= Lawan, Nepal =

Lawan, Nepal लावन
- Municipality
- Location in Nepal
- Coordinates: 28.99°N 83.02°E
- Country: Nepal
- Zone: Karnali Zone
- District: Dolpa District

Population (1991)
  - Total: 1,270
- Time zone: UTC+5:45 (Nepal Time)

Lawan is a village development committee in Dolpa District in the Karnali Zone of north-western Nepal. At the time of the 1991 Nepal census it had a population of 1270 persons living in 279 individual households.
