= Sunhu =

Coordinates: 29°0′N 82°49′E

Shun सुँ
- Interactive map of Shun
- Country: Nepal
- Zone: Karnali Zone
- District: Dolpa District

Population (1991)
  - Total: 1,097
- Time zone: UTC+5:45 (Nepal Time)

Shun is a village development committee in Dolpa District in the Karnali Zone of north-western Nepal. At the time of the 1991 Nepal census it had a population of 1097 persons living in 235 individual households.
