= Rimi, Nepal =

Rimi, Nepal रिमी
- Municipality
- Location in Nepal
- Coordinates: 29°08′N 82°34′E
- Country: Nepal
- Zone: Karnali Zone
- District: Dolpa District

Population (1991)
  - Total: 970
- Time zone: UTC+5:45 (Nepal Time)

Rimi is a village development committee in Dolpa District in the Karnali Zone of north-western Nepal. At the time of the 1991 Nepal census, it had a population of 970 persons living in 174 individual households.
