= Gechugaa =

Village in Nepal

Gechugaa is a small village located at Kshetrapa, Dolakha, Nepal. In this village only four families live here.
