= Saldang =

Saldang साल्दाङ
- Municipality
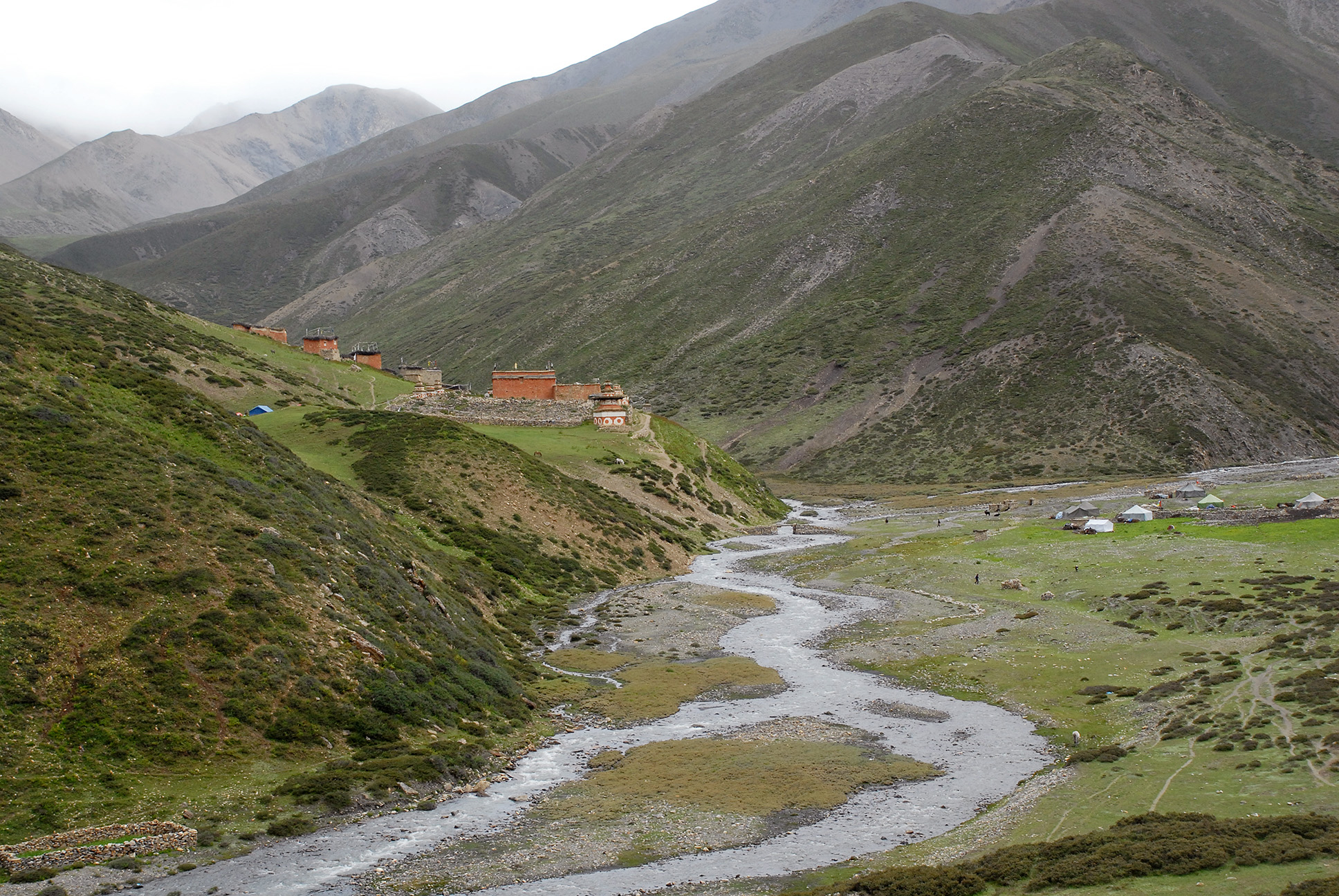
- Saldang, Nepal

- Location in Nepal
- Coordinates: 29.42°N 83.09°E
- Country: Nepal
- Zone: Karnali Zone
- District: Dolpa District
- Elevation: 3,620 m (11,880 ft)

Population (2011)
  - Total: 2,103
- Time zone: UTC+5:45 (Nepal Time)
- Climate: Cwc

Saldang is a village in Dolpa District in the Karnali Zone of north-western Nepal. Saldang lies at an altitude of 3,620 metres (11,880 ft) in the Nankhang Valley, in the historic Tibetan region of Dolpo. At the time of the 1991 Nepal census, Saldang had a population of 1,714 in 386 individual households, and as of 2011 it has a population of 2,103 people.

The British tibetologist David Snellgrove wrote in 1967: "Like many other Dolpo villages, Saldang consists of a group of scattered houses built high on an 'alp' well above the gorge. The name probably means just 'Raised Place' ".

== Geography ==
Saldang is situated at an altitude of 3,620 metres (11,880 ft) of northwestern Nepal in the Nankhang Valley, the most populous of the sparsely populated valleys making up the culturally Tibetan region of Dolpo. To the northwest of Saldang is the village of Bhijer and Shey Phoksundo National Park. Payang Town in Shigatse, Tibet, is about 80 kilometres (50 mi) by air northeast of the village. It is a two-day walk from Saldang to Yang Tsher Monastery to reach Kato, a market on the border with Tibet where salt and wool from Tibet and foodgrains from Nepal are traded.

== Education ==
The village contains Shree Shelri Drugdra Lower Secondary School, which was founded by Lama Karma Dhondup in 1997 after forming a School Management Committee. The school opened in 1999 with 33 children and 2 teachers. In 2004 an Upper School was built for older children. As of 2019 it has around 80 children from pre-school to sixth year, teaching a curriculum of Nepali, Tibetan and English languages, science, music, dancing, sports and games. In 2013, the Academy of Engineering and Green Technology at Hartford High School in Connecticut, US, designed a solar-powered wind turbine to help generate electricity for an unnamed school in Saldang.
