= Tripurakot =

Tripurakot त्रिपुराकोट
- Municipality
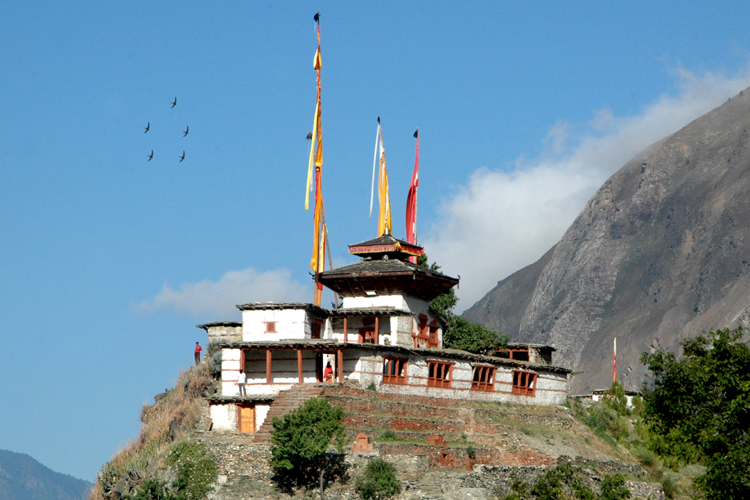

- Location in Nepal
- Coordinates: 29.03°N 82.85°E
- Country: Nepal
- Zone: Karnali Zone
- District: Dolpa District

Population (1991)
  - Total: 1,717
- Time zone: UTC+5:45 (Nepal Time)

Tripurakot is a village development committee in Dolpa District in the Karnali Zone of north-western Nepal. At the time of the 1991 Nepal census it had a population of 1717 persons living in 362 individual households.
