= Mukot =

Kakot काकोट
- ward no.4
- Nickname: सुन्दर गाँउ
- Location in Nepal
- Coordinates: 28.87°N 83.33°E
- Country: Nepal
- Zone: Karnali Zone
- District: Dolpa District

Population (1991)
  - Total: 638
- Time zone: UTC+5:45 (Nepal Time)

Kakot is a village development committee in Dolpa District in the Karnali Zone of north-western Nepal. At the time of the 1991 Nepal census it had a population of 638 persons living in 124 individual households.
