= Churen Himal =

Mountain in Nepal

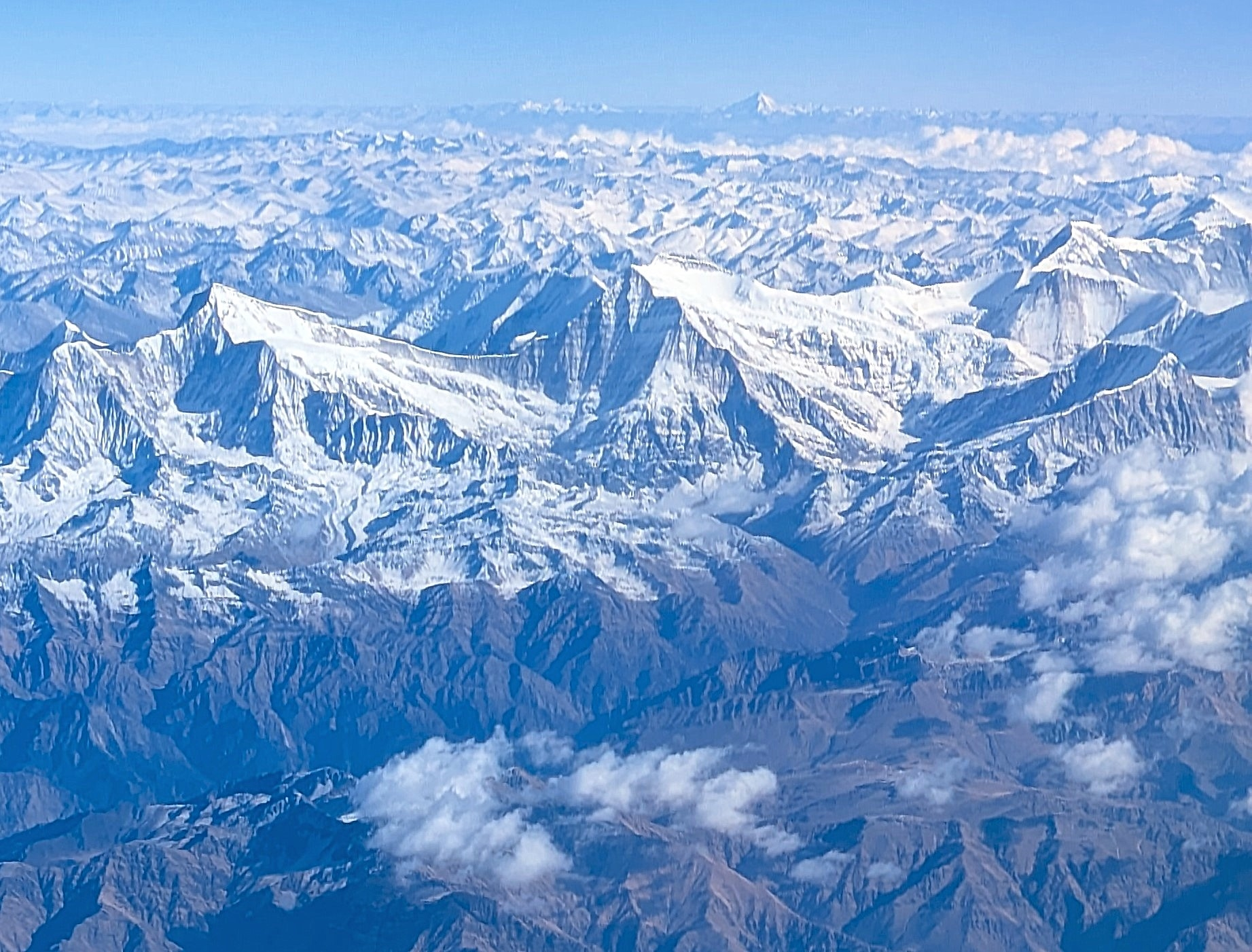
- Churen Himal centered, south aspect

Highest point
- Elevation: 7,371 m (24,183 ft); Ranked 72nd
- Prominence: 600 m (2,000 ft)
- Listing: Mountains of Nepal
- Coordinates: 28°43′55″N 83°12′36″E

Naming
- Native name: चुरे हिमाल (Nepali)

Geography
- Country: Nepal
- Parent range: Dhaulagiri

Climbing
- First ascent: 1970

Churen Himal (Nepali: चुरे हिमाल) is a mountain that is part of the Dhaulagiri massif. It has an elevation of 7,371 metres (24,183 ft).

It was first climbed by Kozo Hasegawa and Ang Norbu Sherpa in 1970.
