= Dho =

Dho Tarap धो
- Village
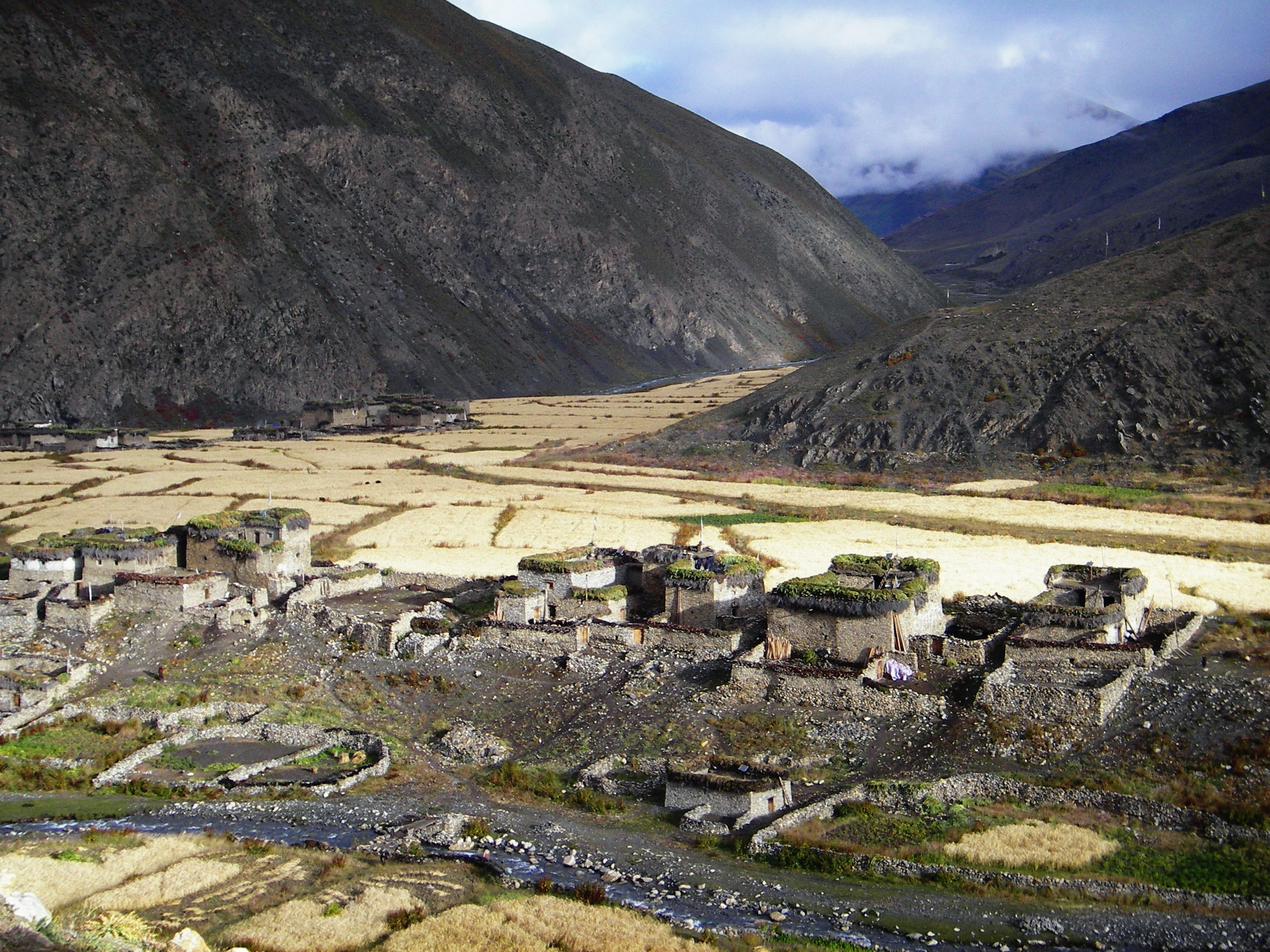
- Interactive map of Dho Tarap
- Country: Nepal
- Province: Karnali Province
- District: Dolpa District
- Municipality: Dolpo Buddha Rural Municipality
- Elevation: 4,080 m (13,390 ft)

Population (2011)
  - Total: 923
- Time zone: UTC+5:45 (Nepal Time)

Dho Tarap is a village in located in the Dolpo Buddha Rural Municipality of Dolpa District of Karnali Province (previously Karnali Zone of Mid-Western Development Regional) of north-western Nepal. At the time of the 2011 Nepal census, it had a population of 923 people living in 205 individual households.

Dho Village (Ward-1, Dolpo Buddha RM) and its neighbor villages Lang (Ward-2, Dolpo Buddha RM) and Tokyou (Ward-3, Dolpo Buddha RM) are collectively known as Dho-Tarap.

== Gallery ==
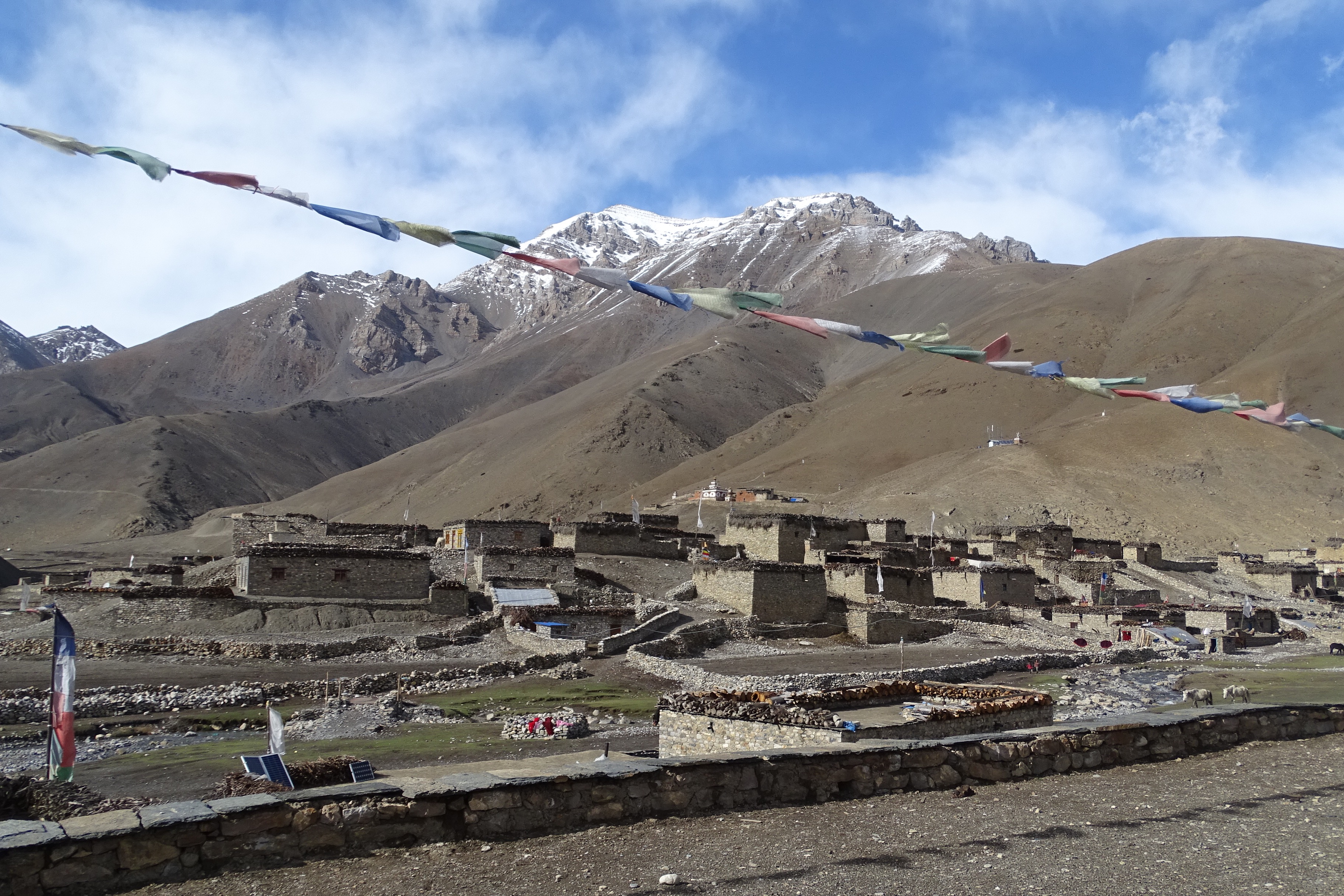

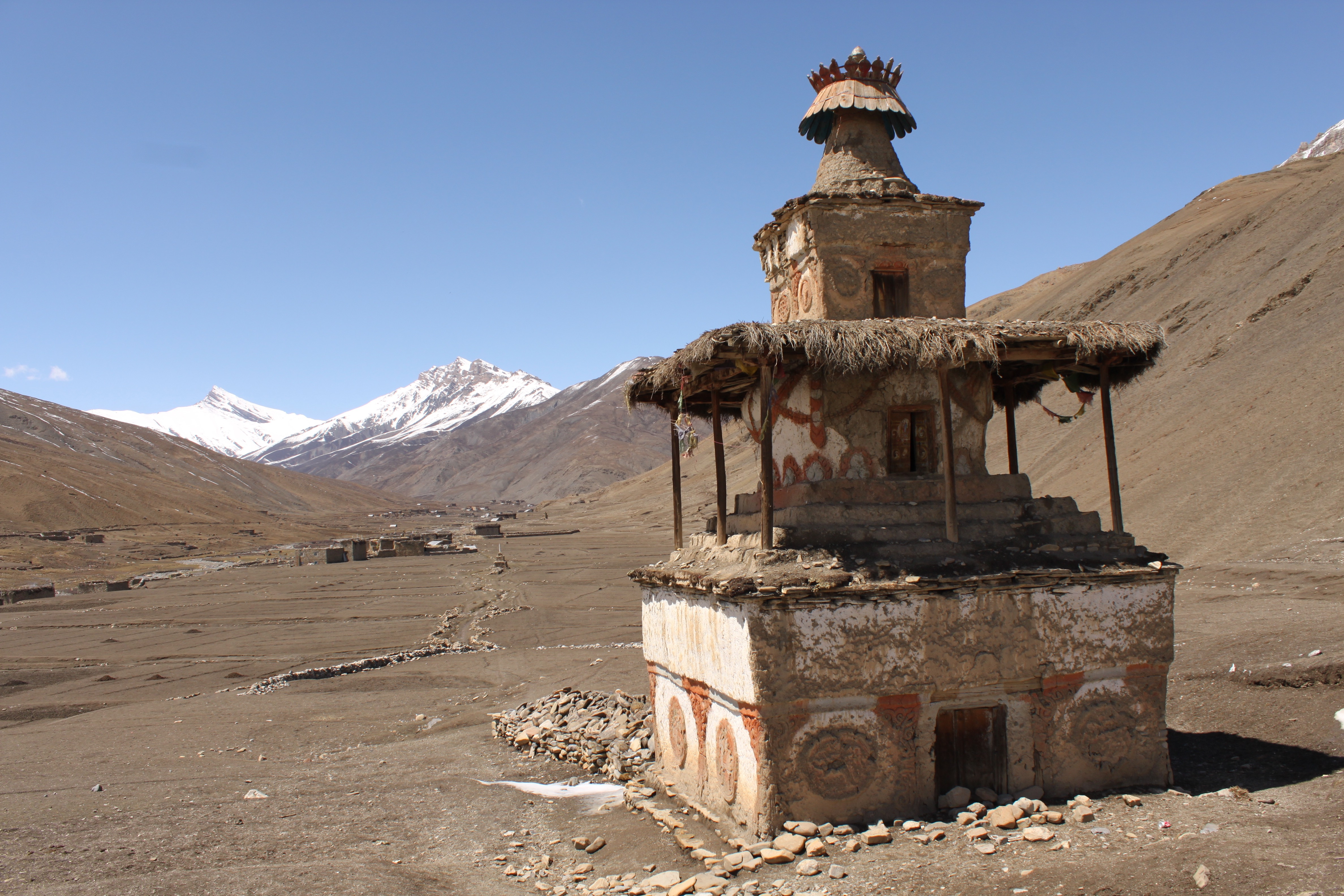
