= Payang Town =

Town in Shigatse, Tibet, China

Coordinates: 30.045°N 83.468°E

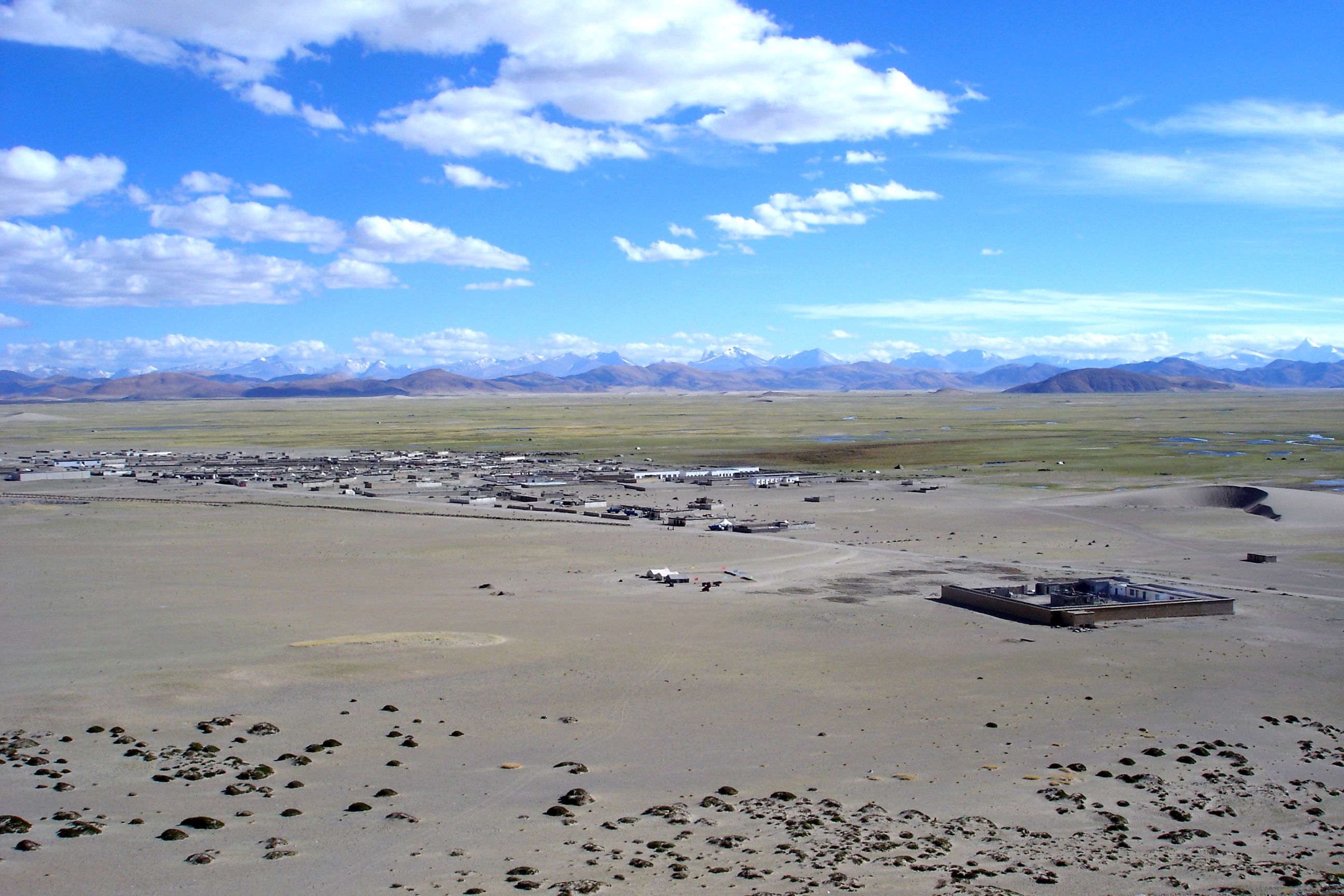
Payang

Payang Town, also Paryang, is a town and township in Zhongba County, Shigatse, in southern Tibet, China, to the west of Zhongba Town by road. It is about 80 kilometres (50 mi) by air northeast of the Nepalese village of Saldang.

== Villages ==
Some of villages under Payang township:

- Dakdokarchung
- Namozaema
- Tsempu
- Toonla
