= Majhphal =

Majhphal माझफाल
- Location in Nepal
- Coordinates: 28.89°N 82.77°E
- Country: Nepal
- Zone: Karnali Zone
- District: Dolpa District

Population (1991)
  - Total: 1,436
- Time zone: UTC+5:45 (Nepal Time)

Mazfal is a village development committee in Dolpa District in the Karnali Zone of north-western Nepal. At the time of the 1991 Nepal census it had a population of 1,436 persons living in 274 individual households.
