= Ram Bahadur Bohara =

Nepali politician

- रामबहादुर बोहोरा
- Incumbent
- Assumed office 2008
- Constituency: Dolpa-1

Personal details
- Party: Communist Party of Nepal (Maoist)

Ram Bahadur Bohara (Nepali: रामबहादुर बोहोरा) is a Nepalese politician, belonging to the Communist Party of Nepal (Maoist). In the 2008 Constituent Assembly election he was elected from the Dolpa-1 constituency, winning 9723 votes.
