= Phoksundo =

Phoksundo फोकसुण्डो
- Municipality
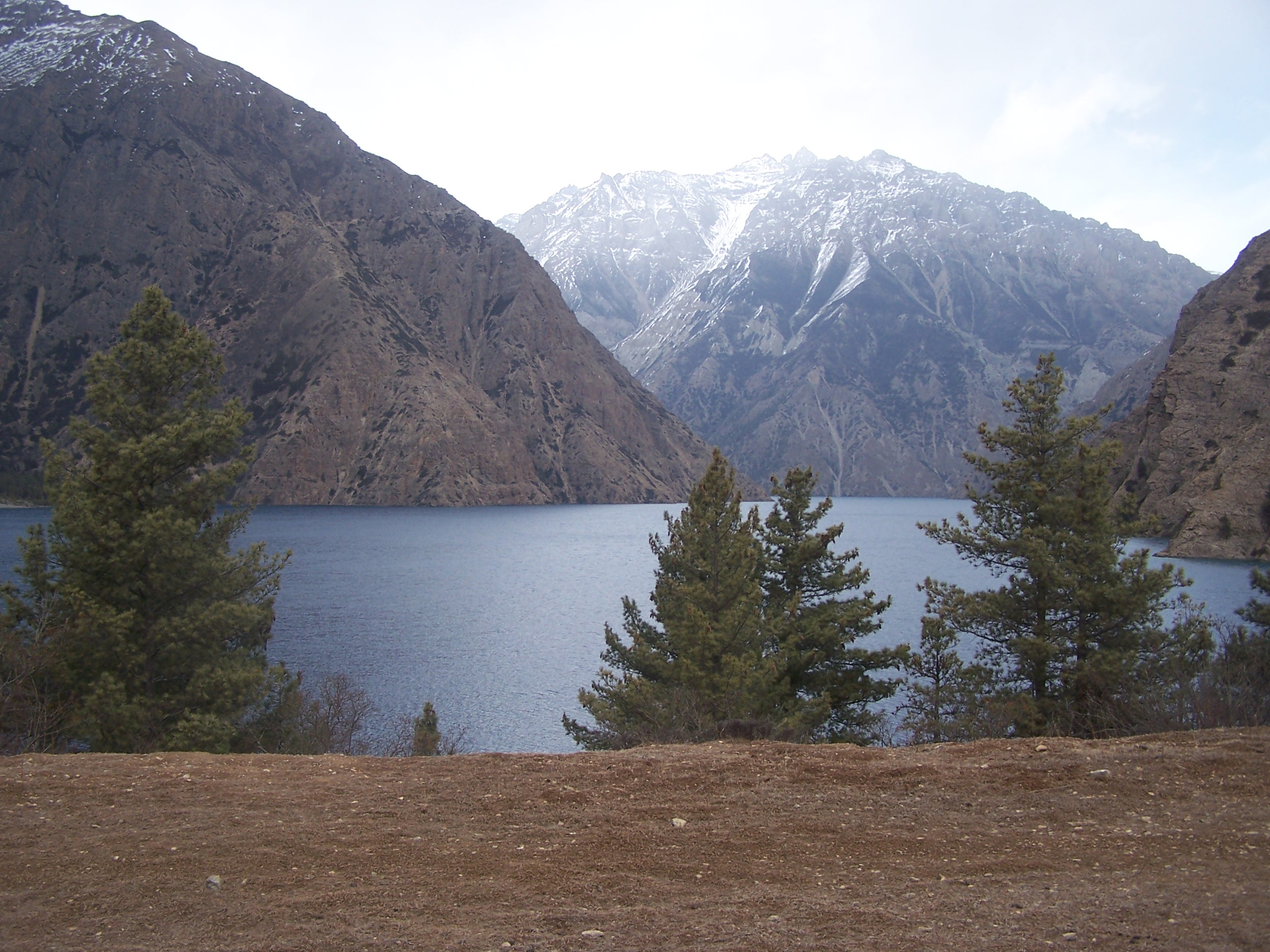
- Phoksundo, Dolpo, Nepal

- Location in Nepal
- Coordinates: 29.20°N 82.89°E
- Country: Nepal
- Zone: Karnali Zone
- District: Dolpa District

Population (1991)
  - Total: 457
- Time zone: UTC+5:45 (Nepal Time)

Phoksundo is a village development committee located at the village of Ringmo in the Dolpa District in the Karnali Zone of north-western Nepal. At the time of the 1991 Nepal census it had a population of 457 persons living in 94 individual households.

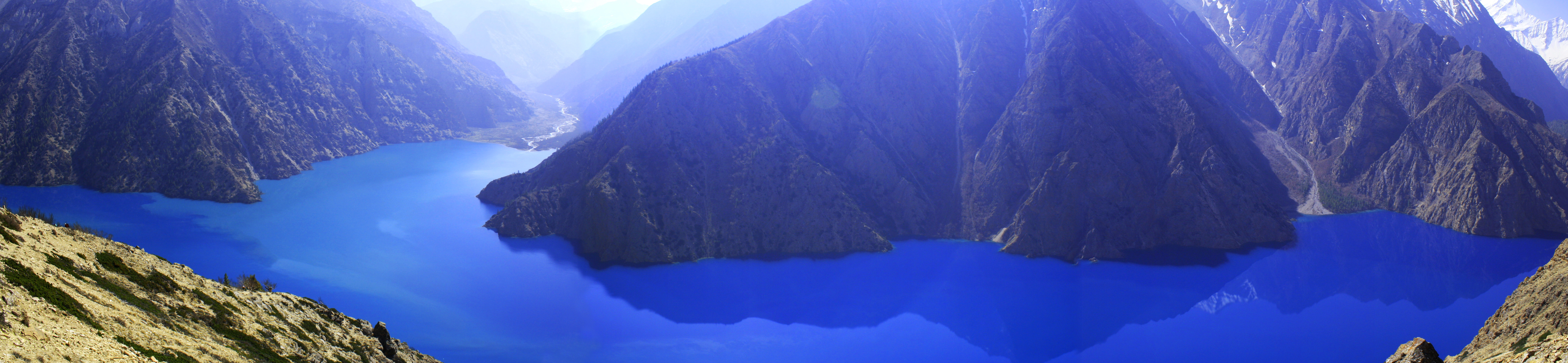
This is the picture of Lake Phoksundo located in Dolpo, Nepal.
