= Kaike language =

Sino-Tibetan language of Nepal

Kaike
- Magar Kaike
- Native to: Nepal
- Ethnicity: 2,000 (2011)
- Native speakers: 50 (2011 census)
- Language family: Sino-Tibetan: Tibeto-Kanauri; Tamangic; Kaike

Language codes
- ISO 639-3: kzq
- Glottolog: kaik1246
- ELP: Kaike

Magar Kaike is a Sino-Tibetan language of Nepal. Ethnologue classifies it as a West Bodish language.

== Distribution ==
Kaike is a Nepali Magar language spoken in Shahartara, Samteling, Tupatara, Tarakot, Namdel and Belawa villages of kaike Rural Municipality, Dolpa District, Karnali Province, Nepal (Ethnologue).

== Linguistic contact ==
Honda (2008) notes that Kaike shares many words with Tamangic, but is not part of Tamangic proper. It is also in contact with Tichurong, a divergent Tibetic lect spoken near the Kaike-speaking areas. Zemp (2023) discusses the heavy influence of Tichurong on Kaike, but notes that Kaike has a Tamangic base.

== Lexicon ==
Honda (2008) lists the following Kaike words.

No.	Gloss	Kaike
1	gold	mar
2	cow	mi
3	blood	kah
4	black	Myanma-
5	red	loma
6	green	piŋgma
7	milk cow	Ne
8	thread	rup
9	heart	diŋg
10	(be) dry	khār-
11	snow	liŋ
12	hen	kā:
13	egg	kā:-pum
14	lay eggs	phum-
15	excrement	khyi
16	one	ti:
17	nose	nā
18	to rest	nā-
19	nasal mucus	nap
20	seven	ne
21	thin	bā-
22	eye	mi:
23	name	min
24	fire	me
25	tongue	lai
26	month	lā
27	ladder	li
28	heavy	li-
29	break (e.g., firewood)	kyut-
30	plough, dig	khoə-
31	borrow/lend	khyi-
32	field	khye
33	chest	gu
34	borrow	ŋan-
35	nest	cāŋ
36	bridge	cām
37	daughter	came
38	hang, tie	cun-
39	knead	cyen-
40	hair	cham
41	lift	thi-
42	measure (e.g., length)	kāt-
43	portion	kāl
44	burn	ko-
45	weigh	kot-
46	shake	khār-
47	feed	khoə:-
48	grandfather	khye
49	suck	ŋup-
50	cook, put on the stove	cu:-
51	now	cõ:
52	count	jyer-
53	what	tai
54	receive	tā:-
55	post, pillar	tā:
56	spread	tit-
57	this year	tiriŋ
58	meet	do:-
59	need to	toə-
60	today	tyā
61	full	nāŋ-
62	tomorrow	nāpcye
63	garlic	noə
64	break (itr.)	noŋ-
65	fear	nyin-
66	go	yā
67	marker of hearsay	ru
68	village	nām
69	dog	khyu
70	fly (insect)	baraŋ
71	fish	ŋā
72	foot, leg	le
73	grind	ra:-
74	cliff	ra:
75	four	li
76	flatten	lep-
77	see	raŋ-
78	smile, laugh	rai-
79	penis	lu
80	forget	let-
81	rice	lā
82	flour	rā:pi
83	buckwheat	barau:
