= Chharka =

Municipality in Karnali Zone, Nepal

Chharka छर्का
- Municipality
- Location in Nepal
- Coordinates: 29.07°N 83.45°E
- Country: Nepal
- Zone: Karnali Zone
- District: Dolpa District
- Elevation: 4,300 m (14,100 ft)

Population (1991)
  - Total: 552
- Time zone: UTC+5:45 (Nepal Time)

Chharka is a village development committee in Dolpa District in the Karnali Zone of north-western Nepal. At the time of the 1991 Nepal census it had a population of 552 persons living in 101 individual households. In the 2001 Nepal census it was found that 627 people identified as Buddhist and seven people identified as Hindu. It also stated that 544 people in 2001 were actually literate, 259 male and 285 female. there were also a total of 438 people who were non literate, 183 males and 255 females. Also according to the 2001 Nepal census there were a total of 634 people living in Chharka. Over one third of this population were in the age group of 4–19 years of age while only roughly about 9% of the population were the age of 50 or over.
