= Sarmi, Nepal =

Coordinates: 29°4′N 82°29′E

Sarmi सर्मी
- Municipality
- Interactive map of Sarmi
- Country: Nepal
- Zone: Karnali Zone
- District: Dolpa District

Population (1991)
  - Total: 1,396
- Time zone: UTC+5:45 (Nepal Time)

Sarmi is a village development committee in Dolpa District in the Karnali Zone of north-western Nepal. At the time of the 1991 Nepal census it had a population of 1,396 people in 279 households.
