= Raha, Nepal =

Raha राहा
- Municipality
- Location in Nepal
- Coordinates: 29°52′N 81°52′E
- Country: Nepal
- Zone: Karnali Zone
- District: Dolpa District

Population (1991)
  - Total: 511
- Time zone: UTC+5:45 (Nepal Time)

Raha is a village development committee and municipality in Dolpa District in the Karnali Zone of north-western Nepal. At the time of the 1991 Nepal census it had a population of 511 persons living in 110 individual households.
