= Bhijer =

Bhijer भिजेर བྱི་གཅེར་
- Rural Municipality
- Nickname: Vijer
- Location in Nepal
- Coordinates: 29.51°N 82.90°E
- Country: Nepal
- Zone: Karnali Zone
- District: Dolpa District

Population (1991)
  - Total: 400
- Time zone: UTC+5:45 (Nepal Time)

Bhijer is a small village which is in the north-west part of Nepal, located in She Phoksundo Rural Municipality ward no.5 in Dolpa district at the altitude of 3800m high from the sea level.

In ancient times, the local name for Bhijer was "Jicher"( Byi, gCher).
