= Juphal =

Juphal जुफाल
- Village of Thuli Bheri Municipality
- Location in Nepal
- Coordinates: 28°58′46″N 82°49′12″E
- Country: Nepal
- Province: Karnali Province
- District: Dolpa District

Population (1991)
  - Total: 1,513
- Time zone: UTC+5:45 (Nepal Time)

Juphal is a village and former Village Development Committee that is now part of Thuli Bheri Municipality in Nepal. The 1991 Nepal census counted 1,513 persons in 300 households.

== Transportation ==
Dolpa Airport lies in Juphal and offers flights to Nepalgunj.
