= Majhgaun =

Majhgaun माझगाउँ Chhetrapa
- Village
- Location of Nepal
- Coordinates: 27.67°N 86.15°E
- Country: Nepal
- Province: Bagmati Province
- District: Dolakha District
- Village: Kshetrapa Village Development Committee
- Time zone: UTC+5:45 (Nepal Time)
- Area code: 45502

Majhgaun (Nepali: माझगाउँ) is a village where the headquarters of the Chhetrapa Village Development Committee (क्षेत्रपा गा.वि.स.) are located in Kshetrapa(Majhgau-माझगाउँ) in Dolakha District in Bagmati Province of north-eastern Nepal.

The community is served by a high school named "Shree Kshetrawati Higher Secondary School" at Peepal Daada, Majhgaun. Through the middle of the village Namdu Jugu road is under construction. Seasonal bus service is available from Kathmandu but about 170 km ride takes 6 to 8 hours due to narrow, winding roads.

Historically, the population of Kshetrapa has been mostly the Jirel people.

Kshetrapa is located along one of the alternate routes from Kathmandu to the summit of Mount Everest.
