= Dolpa District =

District in Karnali Province, Nepal

Coordinates: 28°56′N 82°54′E

- District of Nepal
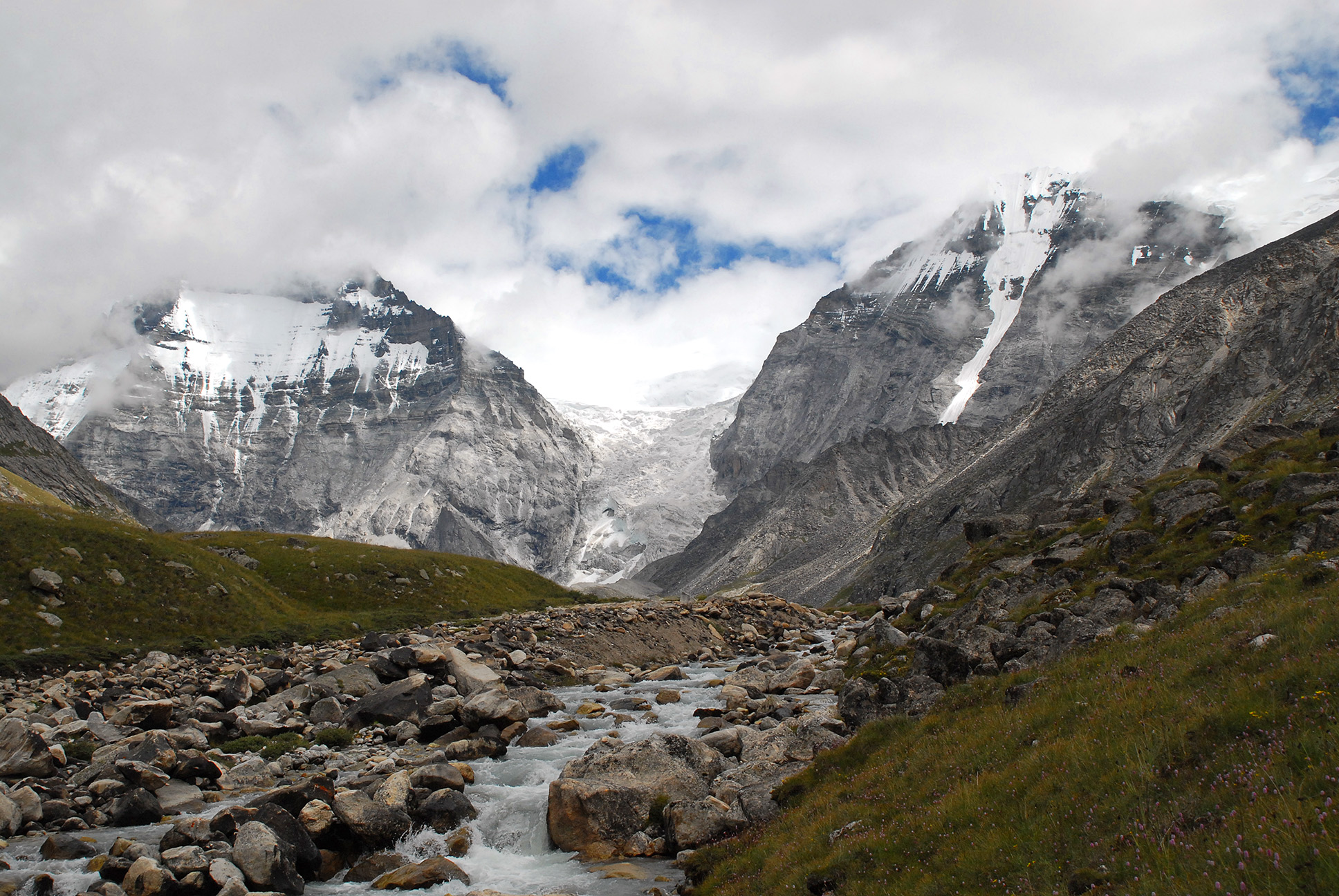
- Yala Kang in Shey Phoksundo National Park

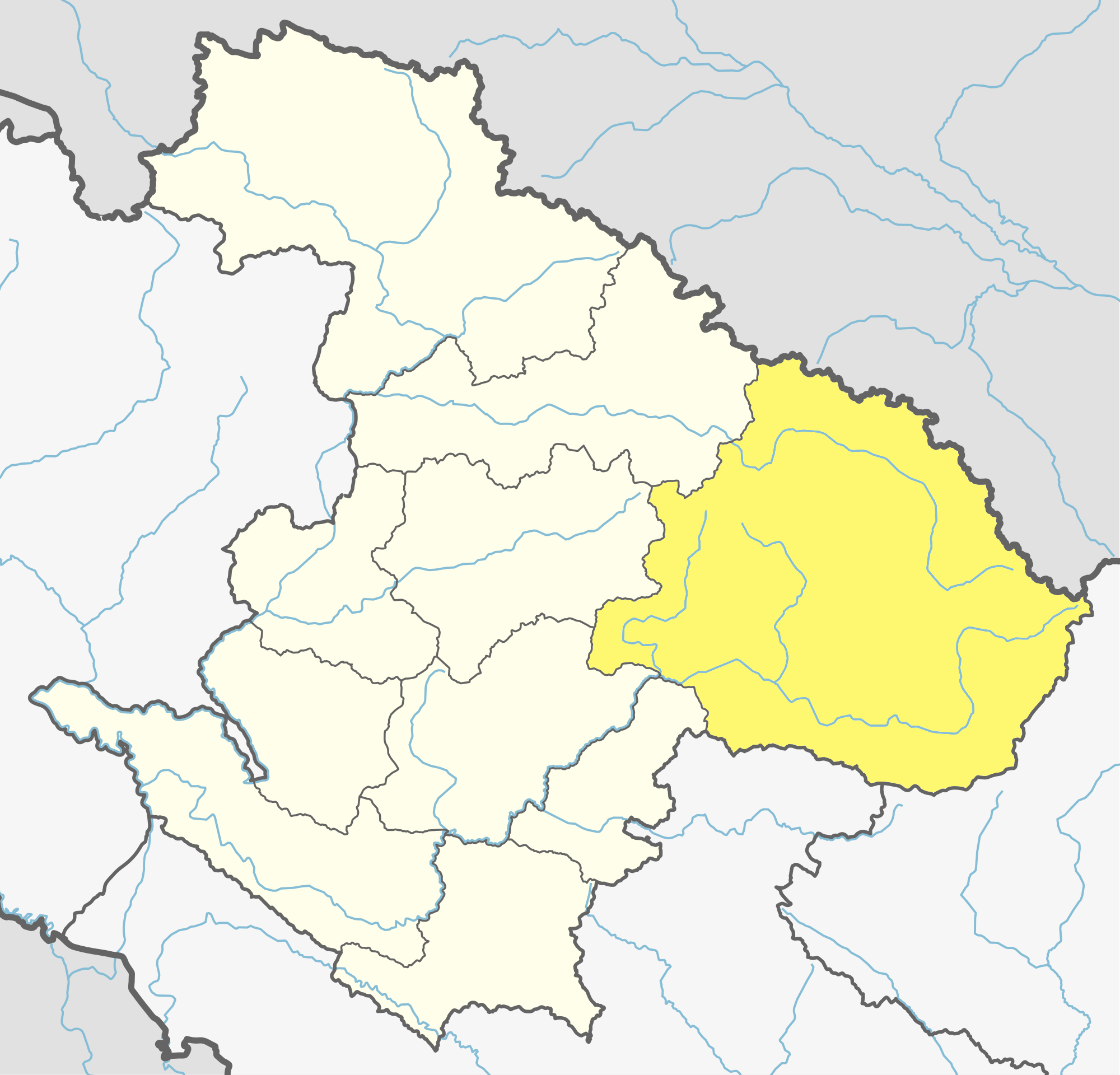
- Location of Dolpa District (dark yellow) in Karnali
- Country: Nepal
- Province: Karnali Province
- Established: 1962
- Admin HQ.: Dunai (Thuli Bheri)
- Municipality: List: Urban; Thuli Bheri; Tripurasundari; Rural; Dolpo Buddha; She Phoksundo; Jagadulla; Mudkechula; Kaike; Chharka Tangsong

Government
  - Type: Coordination committee
  - Body: DCC, Dolpa
  - Head: Sher Bahadur Buda (CPN-UML)
  - Parliamentary constituencies: Dolpa 1
  - Provincial constituencies: Dolpa 1(A) & Dolpa 1(B)

Area
  - Total: 7,889 km^{2} (3,046 sq mi)
  - Rank: 1st

Population (2011)
  - Total: 36,700
  - Density: 4.65/km^{2} (12.0/sq mi)

Demographics
  - Ethnic groups: Chhetri, Magar, Dolpo, Kami, Gurung, Thakuri
  - Female ♀: 50%

Human Development Index
  - Literacy: 53%
- Time zone: UTC+05:45 (NPT)
- Main Language(s): Nepali
- Major highways: Kali Gandaki Corridor
- Website: ddcdolpa.gov.np

Dolpa District (Nepali: डोल्पा जिल्ला), is a district, located in Karnali Province of Nepal, It is one of the seventy-seven districts of Nepal and one of the ten districts of Karnali. The district, with Dunai as its district headquarters, covers an area of 7,889 km^{2} (3,046 sq mi) and has a population (2023) of 43,000. Dolpa is the largest district of Nepal in terms of area.

== Geography and climate ==
Dolpa is the largest district of Nepal covering 5.36% of the total landmass of the country. It is located at 28°43’N to 29°43’N latitude and 82°23’E to 83°41’E longitude. Elevation ranges from 1,525 to 7,625 m (5,003 to 25,016 ft). The district borders Tibet on the north and northeast, Jumla and Mugu districts on the west, Myagdi, Jajarkot, Western and Eastern Rukum on the south, and Mustang on the east.

A large portion of the district is protected by Shey Phoksundo National Park. The name is derived from the 12th-century Shey Monastery and the deepest lake in Nepal, the Phoksundo Lake, both of which lie in the district. The park protects endangered animals like the snow leopard, musk deer and Tibetan wolf. The Shey Phoksundo is the largest and only trans-Himalayan National Park in Nepal.

The district has an altitudinal range of over 5,000 m (16,000 ft) from a little over 1,500 m (4,900 ft) at Tribeni in Kalika Village Development Committee to 7,381 m (24,216 ft) at the peak of Churen Himal. Kanjiroba (6,221 m (20,410 ft)), Mukot (6,638 m (21,778 ft)) and Putha Hiunchuli (7,246 m (23,773 ft)) are other renowned peaks.

Physiographically, the smaller ranges of the Great Himalayas comprise the southern border of the district. Between these and the border mountain ranges of Gautam Himal and Kanti Himal to the north, Dolpa district is a labyrinth of often wide glacial valleys and ridges. Kanjiroba Himal and Kagmara Lekh, running northwest to southeast, separate the valleys of the Jagdula in the west from the rest of the district.

Climate Zone	Elevation Range	% of Area
Subtropical	1,000 to 2,000 meters 3,300 to 6,600 ft.	0.3%
Temperate	2,000 to 3,000 meters 6,400 to 9,800 ft.	5.1%
Subalpine	3,000 to 4,000 meters 9,800 to 13,100 ft.	12.2%
Alpine	4,000 to 5,000 meters 13,100 to 16,400 ft.	8.2%
Nival	above 5,000 meters	3.8%
Trans-Himalayan	3,000 to 6,400 meters 9,800 to 21,000 ft.	70.2%

== Demographics ==
Dolpa's major occupations are agriculture (79.5%) and service (2%).

Historical population
Census year	Pop.	±% p.a.
1981	22,043	—
1991	25,013	+1.27%
2001	29,545	+1.68%
2011	36,700	+2.19%
2021	42,959	+1.59%
Source: Citypopulation

At the time of the 2021 Nepal census, Dolpa District had a population of 42,774. 8.51% of the population is under 5 years of age. It has a literacy rate of 67.02% and a sex ratio of 1001 females per 1000 males. 22,094 (51.65%) lived in municipalities.

Castes/ethnic groups in Dolpa district (2021)
1. Chhetri (47.4%)
2. Magar (12.1%)
3. Dolpo (12.0%)
4. Kami (9.35%)
5. Gurung (5.97%)
6. Thakuri (5.76%)
7. Sarki (2.88%)
8. Damai (1.57%)
9. Bahun (1.06%)
10. Other Hill Janjati (1.31%)
11. Others (0.58%)

Khas people make up a majority of the population with 68% of the population. Hill Janjatis make up 31% of the population, of which Magars are 12% and Gurung 6%.

Languages of Dolpa district (2021)
1. Nepali (75.3%)
2. Magar Kham (9.74%)
3. Dolpali (7.12%)
4. Bhote (2.44%)
5. Magar Kaike (1.98%)
6. Magar Dhut (1.49%)
7. Tichhurong Poike (0.96%)
8. Others (1.01%)

At the time of the 2021 census, 75.26% of the population spoke Nepali, 9.74% Magar Kham, 7.12% Dolpali, 2.44% Bhote, 1.98% Magar Kaike, 1.49% Magar Dhut and 0.96% Tichhurong Poike as their first language. In 2011, 70.1% of the population spoke Nepali as their first language.

Religion in Dolpa District (2021)
Religion	Percent
Hinduism	70.63%
Buddhism	27.77%
Bon	1.06%
Christianity	0.45%
Other or not stated	0.09%

== Tourism ==
The Dolpa region is a distant region of Nepal and the central point of this area is Shey Phoksundo National Park. The east and south of Dolpa are surrounded by the Dhaulagiri and Churen Himal ranges and to the west is the Jumla district. The notable features seen which can be seen here are snowy peaks, ancient and remote villages, rich wildlife, Buddhist monasteries, and lakes. The cultural traditions of this area are basically linked with Tibetan culture.

Trekking into Dolpa presents an exposure to the high and remote Himalayan valleys, resembling the Tibetan highlands. The main highlight of Dolpa trekking includes Shey Phoksundo National Park, one of the major national parks of Nepal. Shey Phoksundo Lake is another famous feature of this region. The lake is totally free of aquatic life, which the crystal waters clearly demonstrate. Surrounded by rocks, forests, and snow-capped peaks, the area has been described as one of the world's natural hidden wonders.

== Transport ==
This district, despite being the largest in area in the nation, had only 1 vehicle as of November 2012, and no road links to other districts. The government was constructing a roadway to link Dunai in the district to Rukum, Jajarkot districts. The road is 118 km (73 mi) long and had been completed in 2018, which connected the district with the national road network.

== Administration ==
The district consists of 8 Municipalities, out of which two are urban municipalities and six are rural municipalities. These are as follows:

- Thuli Bheri Municipality
- Tripurasundari Municipality
- Dolpo Buddha Rural Municipality
- She Phoksundo Rural Municipality
- Jagadulla Rural Municipality
- Mudkechula Rural Municipality
- Kaike Rural Municipality
- Chharka Tangsong Rural Municipality

=== Former village development committees ===
Prior to the restructuring of the district, Dolpa District consisted of the following municipalities and village development committees:

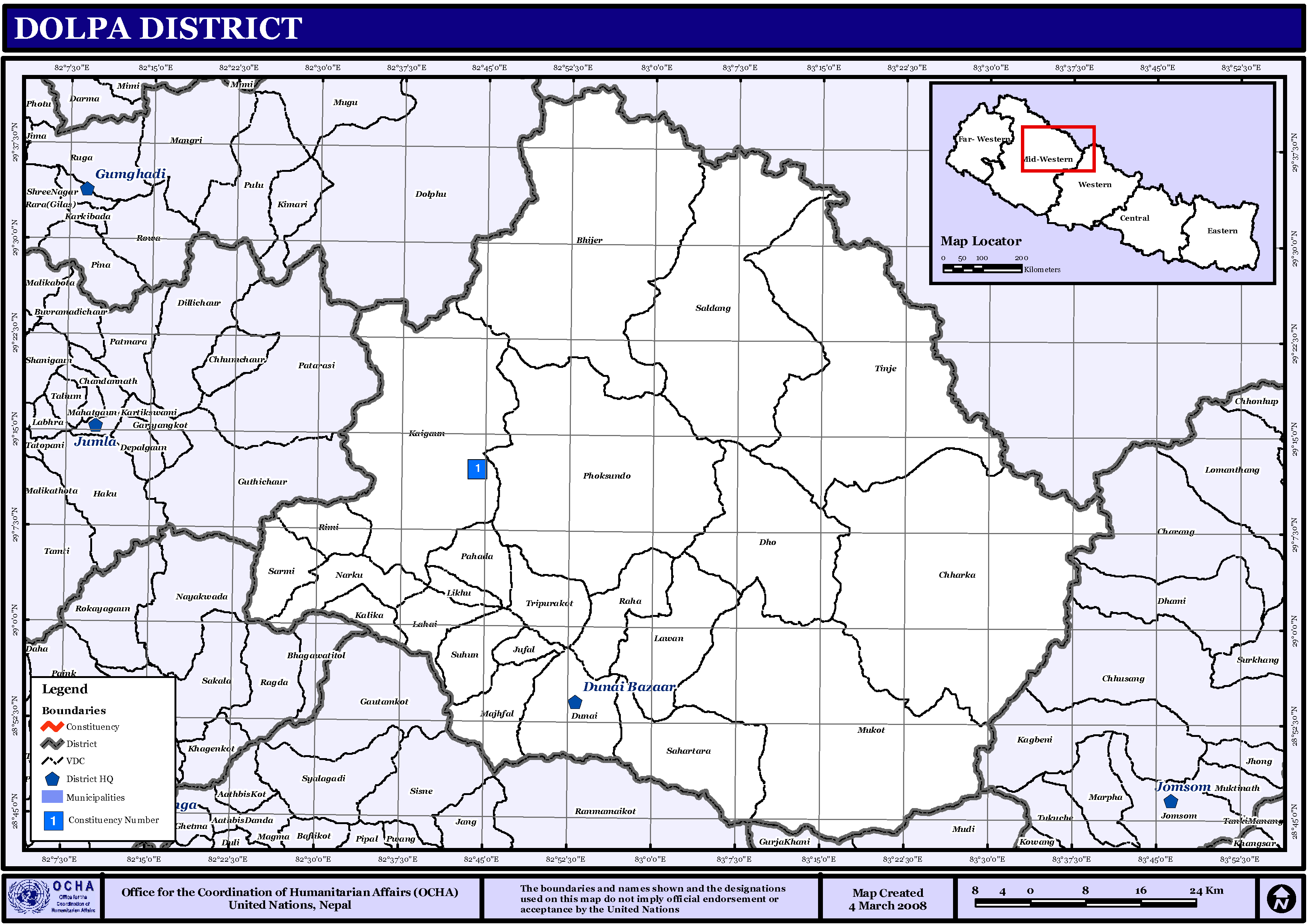
Map of the VDCs in Dolpa District

- Bhijer
- Chharka
- Dho
- Jufal
- Kaigaun
- Kalika
- Lhan
- Lawan
- Likhu
- Majhphal
- Mukot
- Narku
- Pahada
- Phoksundo
- Raha
- Rimi
- Sahartara
- Saldang
- Sarmie
- Shun
- Tinje
- Tripurakot

== See also ==
- Dolpo
- List of highest towns by country
- Photo of Dolpa at http://www.bibekshresth.com.np/2020/08/dazzling-dolpa.html
