= Administration in Karnali Province =

Province of Nepal

Karnali Province

Karnali Province, formerly Karnali Province, is a province of Nepal. It is located in western part of Nepal, surrounded by Gandaki Province in the east, Lumbini Province in the south-east, Sudurpashchim Province in the west and Tibet of China in the north.

Previously, Karnali Province was a development region of Nepal, which known as Mid-Western Development Region. The Mid-Western Development Region comprised three zones and 15 districts. Districts were divided into Municipalities and Villages.

== Administrative structure ==
Karnali is divided into 10 districts and districts are subdivided into Municipalities.

Nepal
Karnali
Districts
Municipality	Rural Municipality
Wards

=== Districts ===
Karnali is divided into 10 districts.

Districts of Nepal
sr.	Districts	Headquarters	Area (km^{2}.)	Population (2011)	Official Website
1	Western Rukum District	Musikot	1,213.49	154,272	
2	Salyan District	Salyan	1,462	242,444	
3	Dolpa District	Dunai	7,889	36,700	
4	Humla District	Simikot	5,655	50,858	
5	Jumla District	Chandannath	2,531	108,921	
6	Kalikot District	Manma	1,741	136,948	
7	Mugu District	Gamgadhi	3,535	55,286	
8	Surkhet District	Birendranagar	2,451	350,804	
9	Dailekh District	Narayan	1,502	261,770	
10	Jajarkot District	Khalanga	2,230	171,304	

=== Municipality ===
There are 25 municipalities in Karnali Province, which is also known as Urban Municipality.

Rank	Name	Nepali	District	Population (2011)	Area	Website
1	Gurbhakot	गुर्भाकोट	Surkhet	43,765	228.62	
2	Dullu	दुल्लु	Dailekh	41,540	156.77	
3	Bheriganga	भेरीगंगा	Surkhet	41,407	256.2	
4	Bangad Kupinde	बनगाड कुपिण्डे	Salyan	36,052	338.21	
5	Chhedagad	छेडागाड	Jajarkot	35,295	284.2	
6	Bagchaur	बागचौर	Salyan	34,118	163.14	
7	Shaarda	शारदा	Salyan	33,730	198.34	
8	Aathabiskot	अाठबिसकाेट	Rukum West	33,601	560.34	
9	Bheri	भेरी	Jajarkot	33,515	219.77	
10	Musikot	मुसिकोट	Rukum West	32,939	136.06	
11	Panchapuri	पञ्चपुरी	Surkhet	32,231	329.9	
12	Lekbeshi	लेकबेशी	Surkhet	30,295	180.92	
13	Aathabis	आठबीस	Dailekh	29,227	168	
14	Chaurjahari	चौरजहारी	Rukum West	27,438	107.38	
15	Narayan	नारायण	Dailekh	27,037	110.63	
16	Chamunda Bindrasaini	चामुण्डा विन्द्रासैनी	Dailekh	26,149	90.6	
17	Nalgad	नलगाड	Jajarkot	25,597	387.44	
18	Khandachakra	खाँडाचक्र	Kalikot	20,288	133.29	
19	Chhayanath Rara	छायाँनाथ रारा	Mugu	20,078	480.67	
20	Chandannath	चन्दननाथ	Jumla	19,047	102.03	
21	Raskot	रास्कोट	Kalikot	16,272	59.73	
22	Tilagufa	तिलागुफा	Kalikot	15,766	262.56	
23	Tripurasundari	त्रिपुरासुन्दरी	Dolpa	10,104	393.54	
24	Birendranagar	बीरेन्द्रनगर	Surkhet	100,458	245.06	
25	Thuli Bheri	ठूली भेरी	Dolpa	8,370	421.34	

=== Rural Municipality ===
There are 54 rural municipality in Karnali Province:

No.	Name	Nepali	Districts	Population (2011)	Area (KM^{2})	Density	Official Web
1	Gurans	गुराँस	Dailekh District	22,033	164.79	134	
2	Bhairabi	भैरवी	Dailekh District	21,233	110.46	192	
3	Naumule	नौमुले	Dailekh District	20,802	228.59	91	
4	Mahabu	महावु	Dailekh District	19,277	110.8	174	
5	Thantikandh	ठाँटीकाँध	Dailekh District	18,896	88.22	214	
6	Bhagawatimai	भगवतीमाई	Dailekh District	18,778	151.52	124	
7	Dungeshwar	डुंगेश्वर	Dailekh District	15,883	105.19	151	
8	Mudkechula	मुड्केचुला	Dolpa District	5,129	250.08	21	
9	Kaike	काईके	Dolpa District	3,576	466.6	8	
10	She Phoksundo	शे फोक्सुन्डो	Dolpa District	3,099	123.07	25	
11	Jagadulla	जगदुल्ला	Dolpa District	2,273	83.3	27	
12	Dolpo Buddha	डोल्पो बुद्ध	Dolpa District	2,126	377.38	6	
13	Chharka Tongsong	छार्का ताङसोङ	Dolpa District	1,451	345.57	4	
14	Simkot	सिमकोट	Humla District	11,557	785.89	15	
15	Sarkegad	सर्केगाड	Humla District	9,868	306.7	32	
16	Adanchuli	अदानचुली	Humla District	7,116	150.61	47	
17	Kharpunath	खार्पुनाथ	Humla District	6,011	880	7	
18	Tanjakot	ताँजाकोट	Humla District	5,964	159.1	37	
19	Chankheli	चंखेली	Humla District	5,517	1,310.41	4	
20	Namkha	नाम्खा	Humla District	3,900	2,419.64	2	
21	Junichande	जुनीचाँदे	Jajarkot District	21,733	346.21	63	
22	Kushe	कुसे	Jajarkot District	20,621	273.97	75	
23	Barekot	बारेकोट	Jajarkot District	18,083	577.5	31	
24	Shivalaya	शिवालय	Jajarkot District	15,269	134.26	114	
25	Tatopani	तातोपानी	Jumla District	14,638	525.56	28	
26	Patarasi	पातारासी	Jumla District	14,571	814.07	18	
27	Tila	तिला	Jumla District	13,607	175.49	78	
28	Kanaka Sundari	कनकासुन्दरी	Jumla District	12,977	225.39	58	
29	Sinja	सिंजा	Jumla District	12,395	153.29	81	
30	Hima	हिमा	Jumla District	10,961	132.32	83	
31	Guthichaur	गुठिचौर	Jumla District	9,870	427	23	
32	Narharinath	नरहरिनाथ	Kalikot District	21,366	143.86	149	
33	Palata	पलाता	Kalikot District	15,303	318.84	48	
34	Shubha Kalika	शुभ कालिका	Kalikot District	14,080	97.32	145	
35	Sanni Triveni	सान्नी त्रिवेणी	Kalikot District	12,846	136.71	94	
36	Pachaljharana	पचालझरना	Kalikot District	12,343	166.92	74	
37	Mahawai	महावै	Kalikot District	8,323	322.07	26	
38	Khatyad	खत्याड	Mugu District	17,116	281.12	61	
39	Soru	सोरु	Mugu District	12,238	365.8	33	
40	Mugum Karmarong	मुगुम कार्मारोंग	Mugu District	5,396	2,106.91	3	
41	Sani Bheri	सानीभेरी	West Rukum District	22,194	133.8	166	
42	Triveni	त्रिवेणी	West Rukum District	19,404	85.49	227	
43	Banphikot	बाँफिकोट	West Rukum District	18,696	190.42	98	
44	Kumakh	कुमाख	Salyan District	24,972	177.28	141	
45	Kalimati	कालीमाटी	Salyan District	23,005	500.72	46	
46	Chhatreshwari	छत्रेश्वरी	Salyan District	21,452	150.69	142	
47	Darma	दार्मा	Salyan District	19,966	81.46	245	
48	Kapurkot	कपुरकोट	Salyan District	18,204	119.21	153	
49	Triveni	त्रिवेणी	Salyan District	16,634	119.11	140	
50	Siddha Kumakh	सिद्ध कुमाख	Salyan District	13,593	89.36	152	
51	Barahatal	बराहताल	Surkhet District	26,802	455.09	59	
52	Simta	सिम्ता	Surkhet District	25,845	241.64	10	
53	Chaukune	चौकुने	Surkhet District	25,240	381.01	66	
54	Chingad	चिङ्गाड	Surkhet District	17,275	170.19	102	
