= Chhayanath Rara =

Chhayanath Rara छायाँनाथ रारा
- Municipality
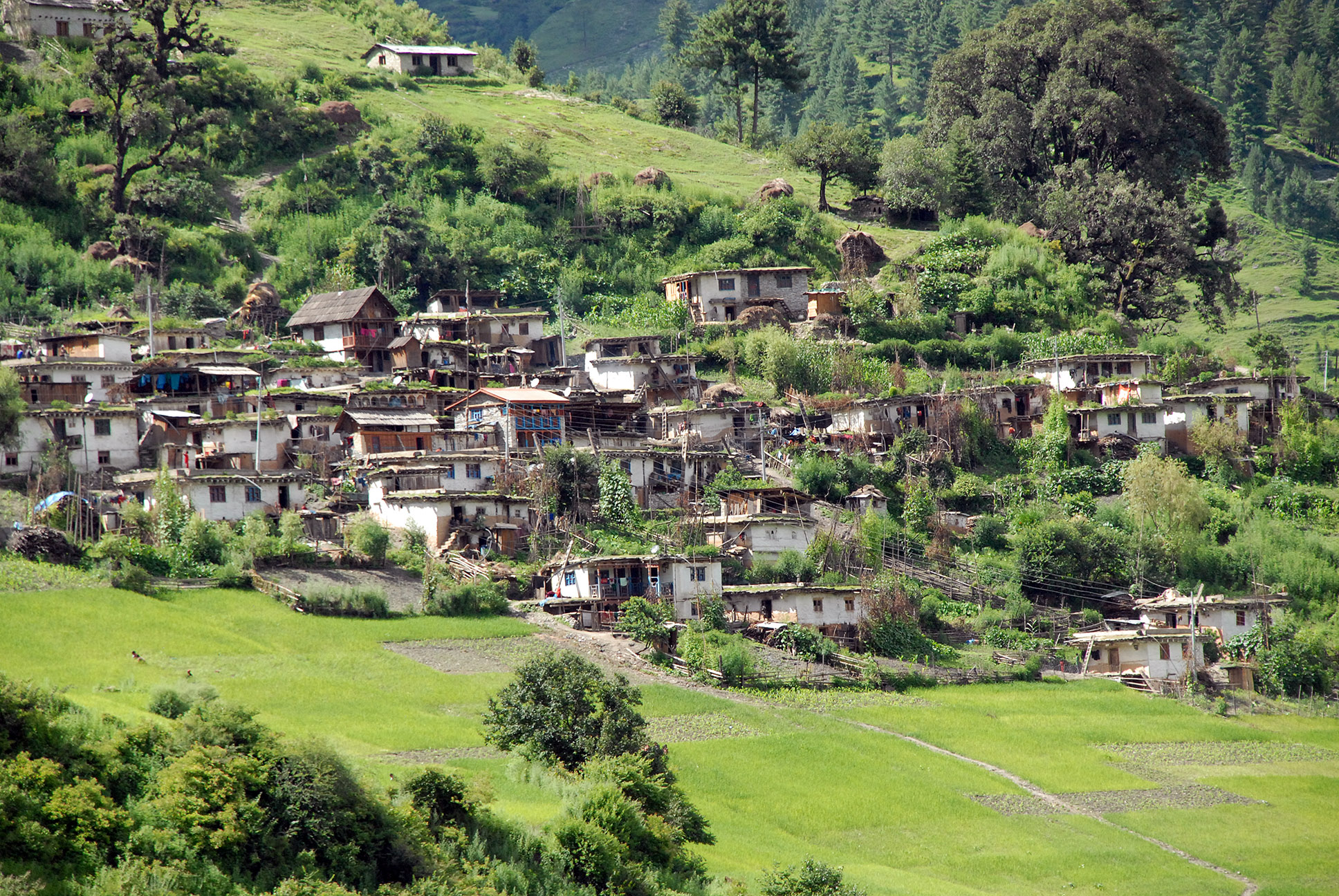
- Pina village

- Location in Nepal
- Coordinates: 29.55°N 82.166667°E
- Country: Nepal
- Province: Karnali
- District: Mugu
- No. of wards: 14
- Established: 10 March 2017

Government
  - Type: Mayor-council
  - Mayor: Mr. Bishnu Kumar Bham (NC)
  - Deputy mayor: Mrs. Aishwarya Malla (NCP)

Area
  - Total: 480.67 km^{2} (185.59 sq mi)

Population (2011)
  - Total: 20,078
  - Density: 41.771/km^{2} (108.19/sq mi)
- Time zone: UTC+5:45 (NST)
- Website: official website

Chhayanath Rara (Nepali: छायाँनाथ रारा) is an urban municipality located in Mugu District of Karnali Province of Nepal.

The total area of the municipality is 480.67 square kilometres (185.59 sq mi) and the total population of the municipality as of 2011 Nepal census is 20,078 individuals. The municipality is divided into total 14 wards.

The municipality was established on 10 March 2017, when Government of Nepal restricted all old administrative structure and announced 753 local level units as per the new constitution of Nepal 2015.

Shrinagar, Karkibada, Pina, part of Rara, Rowa, Gamgadhi and Ruga Village development committees were Incorporated to form this new municipality. The headquarters of the municipality is situated at Gamgadhi. The district headquarter of Mugu is also situated here.

== Demographics ==
At the time of the 2011 Nepal census, Chhayanath Rara Municipality had a population of 20,457. Of these, 99.5% spoke Nepali, 0.2% Sherpa, 0.1% Gurung and 0.2% other languages as their first language.

In terms of ethnicity/caste, 60.1% were Chhetri, 16.0% Kami, 12.0% Thakuri, 5.4% Damai/Dholi, 2.6% other Dalit, 1.2% Hill Brahmin, 0.7% Newar, 0.4% Sarki, 0.4% Bhote and 1.2% others.

In terms of religion, 98.6% were Hindu, 0.8% Buddhist, 0.4% Christian and 0.2% others.

== Transportation ==
Talcha Airport lies in Old-Karkibada offering flights to Nepalgunj and Birendranagar.
