= Mugum Karmarong Rural Municipality =

Rural municipality in Karnali Province, Nepal

Mugum Karmarong मुगूम कार्मारोङ गाउँपालिका
- Rural Municipality
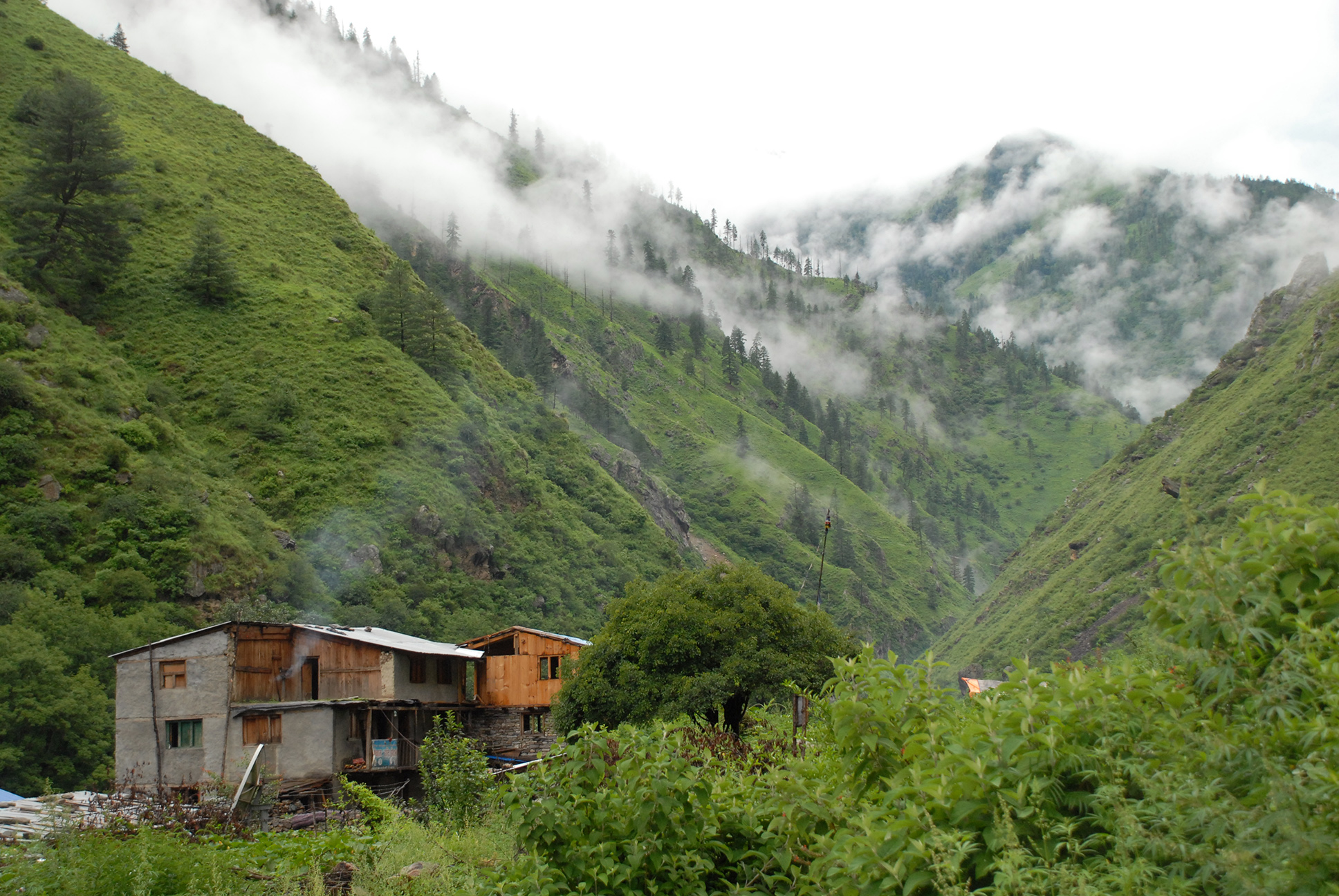
- Pulu village

- Location of rural council Mugum Karmarong (Nepal)
- Coordinates: 29°35′0″N 82°23′30″E
- Country: Nepal
- Province: Karnali Province
- District: Mugu
- Wards: 9
- Established: 10 March 2017

Government
  - Type: Rural Council
  - Chairperson: Mr. Tsiring Kyapne Lama
  - Vice-chairperson: Mr. Chhiring Puti Lama

Area
  - Total: 2,106.91 km^{2} (813.48 sq mi)
  - Rank: 2nd largest RM

Population (2011)
  - Total: 6,222
  - Density: 2.953/km^{2} (7.649/sq mi)
- Time zone: UTC+5:45 (Nepal Standard Time)
- Headquarter: Pulu
- Website: mugumkarmarongmun.gov.np

Mugum Karmarong (Nepali: मुगुम कार्मारोंग गाउँपालिका) is a rural municipality located in Mugu District of Karnali Province of Nepal. The rural municipality spans 2,106.91 square kilometres (813.48 sq mi) of area, with a total population of 5,393 according to a 2011 Nepal census. Mugum Karmarong is the second largest rural municipality of Nepal.

On March 10, 2017, the Government of Nepal restructured the local level bodies into 753 new local level structures.

The previous Dolphu, Mugu, Kimari, Pulu and Mangri VDCs were merged to form Mugum Karmarong Rural Municipality. Mugum Karmarong is divided into 9 wards, with Pulu declared the administrative center of the rural municipality.

== Demographics ==
At the time of the 2011 Nepal census, Mugum Karmarong Rural Municipality had a population of 5,423. Of these, 67.4% spoke Tamang, 24.9% Nepali, 7.3% Sherpa and 0.4% other languages as their first language. In terms of ethnicity/caste, 74.9% were Tamang, 16.9% Chhetri, 7.0% Kami, 0.4% other Dalit, 0.2% other Terai and 0.6% others. In terms of religion, 74.6% were Buddhist and 25.4% Hindu.

At the time of the 2021 census, Mugum Karmarong had a population of 6,222. In ethnicity/caste terms, 28.66% of the population was Chhetri, 26.28% Mugum, 20.01% Karmarong, 16.67% Tamang and 7.96% Biswakarma. 36.00% of the population spoke Karmarong, 34.38% Nepali, 24.27% Mugali and 4.10% Tamang as their first language. In terms of religion, 70.75% were Buddhist and 29.20% Hindu.
