= Narharinath Rural Municipality =

Rural Municipality in Karnali Province, Nepal

Narharinath नरहरिनाथ गाउँपालिका
- Rural Municipality
- Location in Nepal
- Coordinates: 29°10′0″N 81°33′45″E
- Country: Nepal
- Province: Karnali Province
- District: Kalikot
- Wards: 9
- Established: 10 March 2017

Government
  - Type: Rural Council
  - Chairperson: Mr. Nagend Bahadur Bista (NCCP)
  - Vice-chairperson: Mrs. Kamal Bahaur Shah (NCP)

Area
  - Total: 143.86 km^{2} (55.54 sq mi)

Population (2011)
  - Total: 21,366
  - Density: 148.52/km^{2} (384.66/sq mi)
- Time zone: UTC+5:45 (NST)
- Headquarter: Kumalgaun
- Website: narharinathmun.gov.np

Narharinath (Nepali: नरहरिनाथ गाउँपालिका) is a rural municipality located in Kalikot District of Karnali Province of Nepal.

According to Ministry of Federal Affairs and General Administration, Narharinath rural municipality has an area of 143.86 square kilometres (55.54 mi^{2}) and the total population of the rural municipality is 21,366 as of 2011 Nepal census.

Kumalgaun, Kotbada, Rupsa, Malkot and Lalu which previously were all separate Village development committees merged to form this new local level body. Fulfilling the requirement of the new Constitution of Nepal 2015, Ministry of Federal Affairs and General Administration replaced all old VDCs and Municipalities into 753 new local level bodies.

The rural municipality is divided into total 9 wards and the headquarters of this newly formed rural municipality is situated at Kumalgaun.
