= Khandachakra =

Khandachakra खाँडाचक्र
- Municipality
- Location in Nepal
- Coordinates: 29.15°N 81.616667°E
- Country: Nepal
- Province: Karnali
- District: Kalikot
- No. of wards: 11
- Established: 10 March 2017

Government
  - Type: Mayor-council
  - Mayor: Mr. Kamal Bahadur Shahi (CPN (US))
  - Deputy mayor: Mr. Ganesh Bahadur Shahi (Communist Party of Nepal (Maoist Centre))

Area
  - Total: 133.29 km^{2} (51.46 sq mi)

Population (2021)
  - Total: 22,274
  - Density: 167/km^{2} (430/sq mi)
- Time zone: UTC+5:45 (NST)
- Website: official website

Khandachakra (Nepali: खाँडाचक्र) is an urban municipality located in Kalikot District of Karnali Province of Nepal.

The total area of the municipality is 133.29 square kilometres (51.46 sq mi) and the total population of the municipality as of 2021 Nepal census is 22,274 individuals. The municipality is divided into total 11 wards.

The municipality was established on 10 March 2017, when Government of Nepal restricted all old administrative structure and announced 744 local level units as per the new constitution of Nepal 2015.

Manma, Daha, Pakha, Badalkot and some part of Bharta Village development committees were Incorporated to form this new municipality. The headquarters of the municipality is situated at Manma
