= Tilagupha =

Tilagupha तिलागुफा
- Municipality
- Location in Nepal
- Coordinates: 29.158333°N 81.791667°E
- Country: Nepal
- Province: Karnali
- District: Kalikot
- No. of wards: 11
- Established: 10 March 2017

Government
  - Type: Mayor-council
  - Mayor: Mr. Shankar Prasad Upadhayaya
  - Deputy mayor: Mr. Mahendra Bahadur Shahi

Area
  - Total: 262.56 km^{2} (101.37 sq mi)

Population (2021)
  - Total: 16,197
  - Density: 61.689/km^{2} (159.77/sq mi)
- Time zone: UTC+5:45 (NST)
- Website: official website

Tilagupha (Nepali: तिलागुफा) is an urban municipality located in Kalikot District of Karnali Province of Nepal.

The total area of the municipality is 262.6 square kilometres (101.4 sq mi), and the total population, as of the 2021 Nepal census, is 16,197. The municipality is divided into 11 wards.

The municipality was established on 10 March 2017, when Government of Nepal restricted all old administrative structure and announced 744 local level units as per the new constitution of Nepal 2015.

Phoi Mahadev, Ranchuli, Jubitha, Chhapre and part of Chilkhaya Village development committees were incorporated to form this new municipality. The headquarters of the municipality is situated at Jubitha.
