= Shubha Kalika Rural Municipality =

Rural Municipality in Karnali Province, Nepal

Shubha Kalika शुभकालिका गाउँपालिका
- Rural Municipality
- Location in Nepal
- Coordinates: 29°4′30″N 81°38′0″E
- Country: Nepal
- Province: Karnali Province
- District: Kalikot
- Wards: 8
- Established: 10 March 2017

Government
  - Type: Rural Council
  - Chairperson: Mr. Anail Acharya
  - Vice-chairperson: Mrs. Pampha Kumari Shahi

Area
  - Total: 97.32 km^{2} (37.58 sq mi)

Population (2011)
  - Total: 14,080
  - Density: 144.7/km^{2} (374.7/sq mi)
- Time zone: UTC+5:45 (NST)
- Headquarter: Sukatiya
- Website: Official website

Shubha Kalika (Nepali: शुभकालिका गाउँपालिका) is a rural municipality located in Kalikot District of Karnali Province of Nepal.

According to Ministry of Federal Affairs and General Administration, Shubha Kalika rural municipality has an area of 97.32 square kilometres (37.58 mi^{2}) and the total population of the rural municipality is 14,080 as of 2011 Nepal census.

Bharta, Mugraha and Sukitaya which previously were all separate Village development committees merged to form this new local level body. Fulfilling the requirement of the new Constitution of Nepal 2015, Ministry of Federal Affairs and General Administration replaced all old VDCs and Municipalities into 753 new local level bodies.

The rural municipality is divided into total 8 wards and the headquarters of this newly formed rural municipality is situated at Sukitaya.
