= Mehal Madi =

Mehal Madi मेहल माडी
- Village development committee
- Location in Nepal
- Coordinates: 29°16′0″N 81°35′0″E
- Country: Nepal
- Zone: Karnali Zone
- District: Kalikot District

Population (1991)
  - Total: 3,162
- Time zone: UTC+5:45 (Nepal Time)

Mehal Madi is a village development committee in Kalikot District in the Karnali Zone of north-western Nepal. At the time of the 1991 Nepal census it had a population of 3162 people living in 499 individual households.
