= Pachaljharana Rural Municipality =

Rural Municipality in Karnali Province, Nepal

Pachaljharana पचालझरना गाउँपालिका
- Rural Municipality
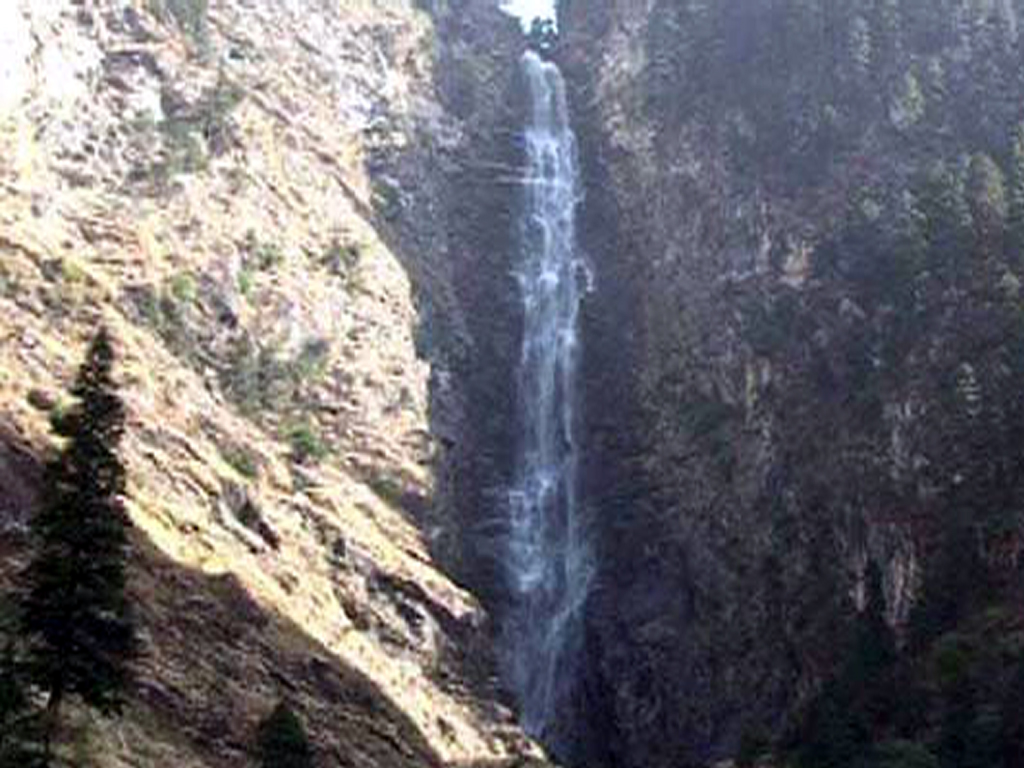
- Pachaljharana

- Location in Nepal
- Coordinates: 29°17′30″N 81°43′0″E
- Country: Nepal
- Province: Karnali Province
- District: Kalikot
- Wards: 9
- Established: 10 March 2017

Government
  - Type: Rural Council
  - Chairperson: Mr. Khadgaraj Sejuwal (NCP)
  - Vice-chairperson: Mrs. Tara Neupane (NCP)

Area
  - Total: 166.92 km^{2} (64.45 sq mi)

Population (2011)
  - Total: 12,343
  - Density: 73.946/km^{2} (191.52/sq mi)
- Time zone: UTC+5:45 (NST)
- Headquarter: Ramnakot
- Website: pachaljharanamun.gov.np

Pachaljharana (Nepali: पचालझरना गाउँपालिका) is a rural municipality located in Kalikot District of Karnali Province of Nepal.

According to Ministry of Federal Affairs and General Administration Pachaljharana rural municipality has an area of 166.92 square kilometres (64.45 mi^{2}) and the total population of the rural municipality is 12,343 as of 2011 Nepal census.

Nanikot, Ramnakot and some parts of Badalkot which previously were all separate Village development committees merged to form this new local level body. Fulfilling the requirement of the new Constitution of Nepal 2015, Ministry of Federal Affairs and General Administration replaced all old VDCs and Municipalities into 753 new local level bodies.

The rural municipality is divided into total 9 wards and the headquarters of this newly formed rural municipality is situated at Ramnakot.

== Tourism Attractions ==
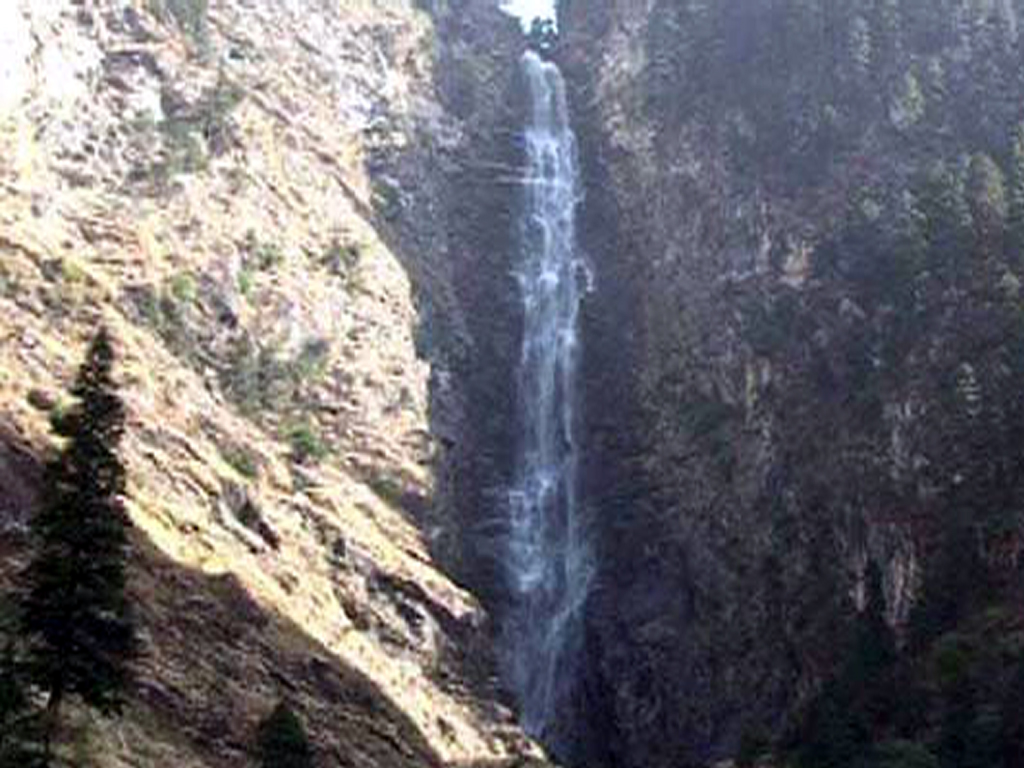
पचाल झरना

- Pachal waterfall is the tallest Waterfall of Nepal located in Karnali Province. The fall height of Pachal Waterfall is 381 m .
