= Ghaina =

Ghaina घैना
- Village development committee
- Country: Nepal
- Zone: Karnali Zone
- District: Mugu District

Population (1991)
  - Total: 1,659
- Time zone: UTC+5:45 (Nepal Time)

Ghaina is a village development committee in Mugu District in the Karnali Zone of north-western Nepal. At the time of the 1991 Nepal census it had a population of 1659 people living in 338 individual households.
