= Raskot =

Raskot (Nepali: रास्कोट) is an urban municipality located in Kalikot District of Karnali Province of Nepal.

The total area of the municipality is 59.73 square kilometres (23.06 sq mi) and the total population, as of 2011 Nepal census, is 16,272. The municipality is divided into 9 wards.

The municipality was established on 10 March 2017, when the Government of Nepal restricted all old administrative structure and announced 744 local level units as per the new constitution of Nepal 2015.

Sipkhana, Siuna and Phukot Village development committees were incorporated to form this new municipality. The headquarters of the municipality is situated at Siuna.
