= Odanku =

Odanku ओडानकु
- Village development committee
- Location in Nepal
- Coordinates: 29°3′0″N 81°52′0″E
- Country: Nepal
- Zone: Karnali Zone
- District: Kalikot District

Population (1991)
  - Total: 2,941
- Time zone: UTC+5:45 (Nepal Time)

Odanku is a village development committee in Kalikot District in the Karnali Zone of north-western Nepal. It is the largest VDC in the district, located in the south-east of Kalikot District. At the time of the 1991 Nepal census it had a population of 2941 people living in 558 individual households.

== Media ==
To promote local culture, Odanku has one FM radio station: Radio Bheka Aawaj - 101.2 MHZ, a Community radio station.
