= Malkot, Nepal =

Coordinates: 28°41′N 81°47′E

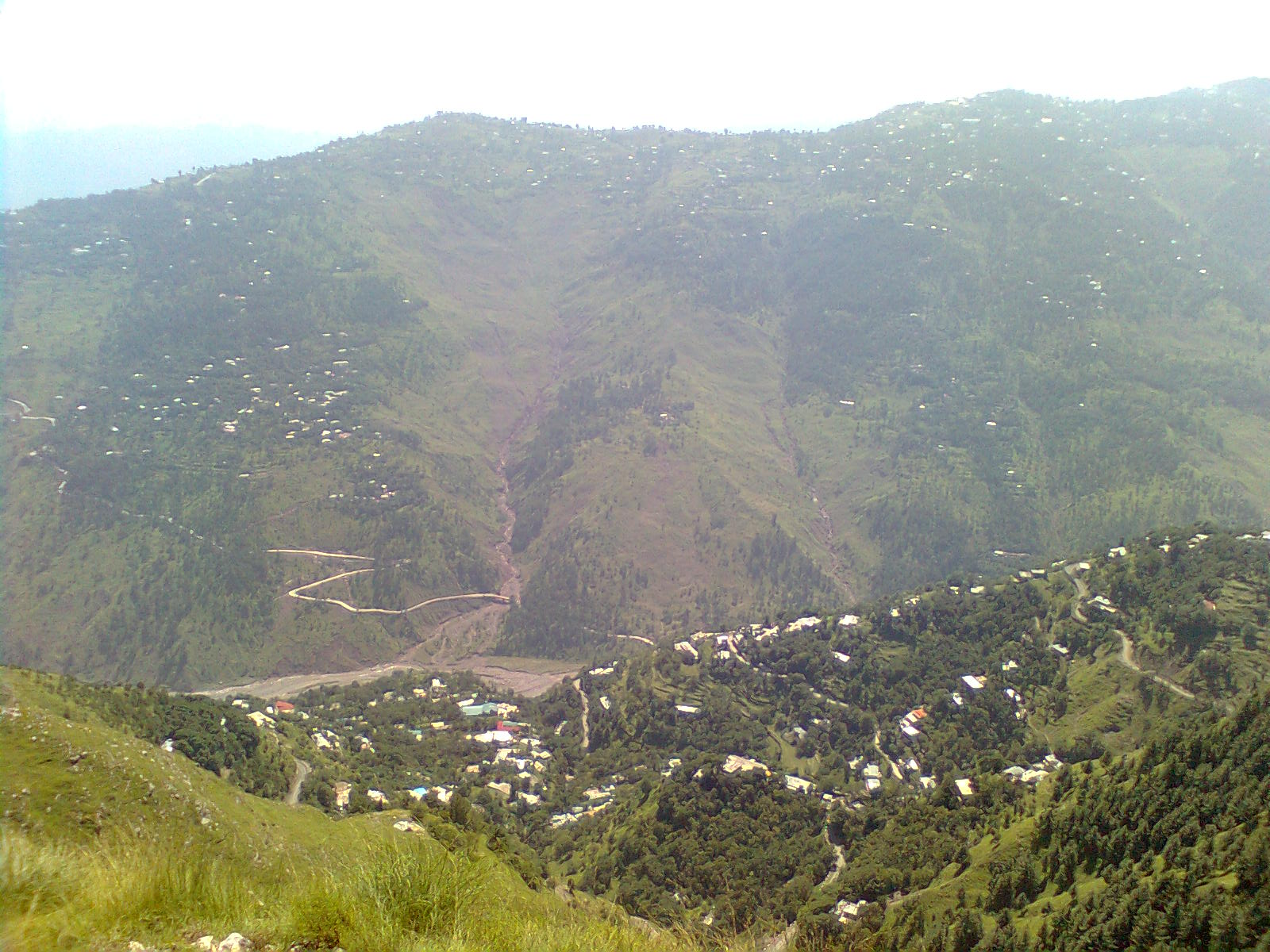

Malkot is a village development committee in Kalikot District in the Karnali Zone of north-western Nepal.
