= Rumale =

Coordinates: 29°29′N 81°56′E

Rumale रुमाले
- Village development committee
- Interactive map of Rumale
- Country: Nepal
- Zone: Karnali Zone
- District: Mugu District

Population (1991)
  - Total: 1,155
- Time zone: UTC+5:45 (Nepal Time)

Rumale is a village development committee in Mugu District in the Karnali Zone of north-western Nepal. At the time of the 1991 Nepal census it had a population of 1154 people living in 220 individual households.
