= Shree Nagar =

Shree Nagar may refer to:

- Shree Nagar, Humla, Nepal
- Shree Nagar, Mugu, Nepal
