= Mumra =

Mumra may refer to:

- Mumra, Nepal
- Mumra, Astrakhan Oblast, Russia
- Mumm-Ra (band), an English indie rock band originally from Bexhill-on-Sea
- Mumm-Ra the Ever-Living, a character in the Thundercats TV series
