= Sanni Triveni Rural Municipality =

Rural Municipality in Karnali Province, Nepal

Sanni Triveni सान्नी त्रिवेणी गाउँपालिका
- Rural Municipality
- Location in Nepal
- Coordinates: 29°17′39.1″N 81°35′30.8″E
- Country: Nepal
- Province: Karnali Province
- District: Kalikot
- Wards: 9
- Established: 10 March 2017

Government
  - Type: Rural Council
  - Chairperson: Mr. Mohan Bahadur KC (Independent)
  - Vice-chairperson: Mrs. Parbati Singh(UML)

Area
  - Total: 136.71 km^{2} (52.78 sq mi)

Population (2011)
  - Total: 12,846
  - Density: 93.965/km^{2} (243.37/sq mi)
- Time zone: UTC+5:45 (NST)
- Headquarter: Mehalmudi
- Website: sannitrivenimun.gov.np

Sanni Triveni (Nepali: सान्नी त्रिवेणी गाउँपालिका) is a rural municipality located in Kalikot District of Karnali Province in Nepal.

According to the Ministry of Federal Affairs and General Administration, Sanni Triveni rural municipality has an area of 136.71 square kilometres (52.78 mi^{2}) and a population of 12,846 as of the 2011 Nepal census.

Mumra, Mehalmudi and Ranku which previously were all separate Village Development Committees (VDCs) merged to form this new local level body. Fulfilling the requirement of the new Constitution of Nepal 2015, the Ministry of Federal Affairs and General Administration replaced all old VDCs and municipalities into 753 new local level bodies.

The rural municipality is divided into 9 wards and the headquarters of this newly formed rural municipality is situated at Mehalmudi.
