= Fishtail Air =

Nepalese helicopter operator

Fishtail Air Pvt. Ltd.
| IATA | ICAO | Call sign |
|---|---|---|
| — | — | — |
- Founded: 1997; 29 years ago
- AOC #: 017/2001
- Hubs: Tribhuvan International Airport (Kathmandu)
- Fleet size: 4
- Headquarters: Sinamangal, Kathmandu
- Key people: Suman Pandey (CEO)
- Website: www.fishtailair.com/

Fishtail Air Pvt. Ltd., from 2018 to 2020 known as Summit Helicopters Pvt. Ltd., is a helicopter airline based at Tribhuvan International Airport in Kathmandu, Nepal, operating chartered helicopter services. The company was established in 1997 under the Air Operators Certificate issued by the Government of Nepal. The company operates domestic chartered helicopter flights throughout Nepal and rescue missions. It also carries out and also international chartered flights to Bhutan and India. It is currently banned from flying into the EU.

== History ==
The Airline was founded under the name Fishtail Air in 1997 in Kathmandu, Nepal. The airline often made headlines in local press after performing unusual yet successful rescue missions in the Himalayas.

Due to the Nepalese Civil War, Fishtail Air did not operate between 2003 and 2007.

In 2010, Fishtail Air was part of a documentary by Swiss Schweizer Radio und Fernsehen, titled The mountain rescuers in the Himalayas wherein the Swiss Airline Air Zermatt and Fishtail Air were establishing a mountaineering rescue station in Lukla. At the same time, mountaineer Simone Moro started working as a pilot for Fishtail Air.

In 2014, Fishtail Air signed a deal with Goma Air with the aim of enhancing Nepal's tourism. Both Airlines were at the time led by Bikash JB Rana, for which a collaboration was eased. Following Goma Air's name change to Summit Air, in 2018, Fishtail Air changed its name to Summit Helicopters to visualize the cooperation on 11 June 2018. On 15 January 2020, the original name Fishtail Air was restored.

Seasonally, Fishtail Air operates one helicopter from Simikot Airport, for which the airport serves as a seasonal hub of the airline. From Simikot, Mount Kailash and Lake Manasarovar are served.

== Fleet ==
The Fishtail Air fleet consists of the following aircraft (as of August 2018):

Fishtail Air fleet
| Aircraft | In fleet | Orders | Passengers | | | Notes |
| Aircraft | In fleet | Orders | C | Y | Total | Notes |
|---|---|---|---|---|---|---|
| Eurocopter AS350 B3e | 2 | 0 | 0 | 5 | 5 | |
| Eurocopter AS350 B3+ | 1 | 0 | 0 | 5 | 5 | |
| Bell Jet Ranger 206 | 1 | 0 | 0 | 4 | 4 | |
| Total | 4 | 0 | | | | |

== Accidents and incidents ==
- 12 November 2001 – A Eurocopter AS 350 of Fishtail Air crashed into Rara Lake carrying Princess Prekshya of Nepal. She and two other passengers as well as the pilot died in the crash.
- 7 November 2010 – A Eurocopter AS 350 of Fishtail Air crashed when it was on a rescue mission on the North ridge of Mount Ama Dablam at an elevation of 6,350 meters. A five-member investigation team was formed on 9 November 2010 and its started its investigation one day later. The final report stated that the main cause of the accident was the inability of pilots to notice and arrest the lateral drift of the chopper to its left due to lack of ground reference until the main rotors came into contact. The accident was covered by the Swiss documentary The mountain rescuers in the Himalayas.
- 19 June 2013 – A Eurocopter AS 350 of Fishtail Air crashed in Humla district en route from Simikot to Hilsa killing one person on board.
- 8 August 2016 – A Eurocopter AS 350 of Fishtail Air crashed in Nuwakot district en route from Gorkha to Kathmandu killing all 7 people on board. The final report blamed pilot stress as the cause of the crash.
