= Sardar Fareed =

Pakistani politician (born 1963)

Member of the Provincial Assembly of Khyber Pakhtunkhwa
- In office 14 June 2014 – 28 May 2018
- Constituency: Constituency PK-45 (Abbottabad-II)

Personal details
- Born: 1963 (age 62–63) Abbottabad District
- Party: Pakistan Muslim League (N)

Sardar Fareed is a Pakistani politician who had been a Member of the Provincial Assembly of Khyber Pakhtunkhwa, from June 2014 to May 2018.

== Early life and education ==
He was born in 1963 in Malkot, Abbottabad District.

He received secondary education.

== Political career ==
He was elected to the Provincial Assembly of Khyber Pakhtunkhwa as a candidate of Pakistan Muslim League (N) from Constituency PK-45 Abbottabad-II in by-election held in June 2014. He received 28,252 votes and defeated a candidate of Pakistan Tehreek-e-Insaf.
