= Mugu, Nepal =

Mugu मुगु
- Village development committee
- Location in Nepal
- Coordinates: 29°52′0″N 82°37′0″E
- Country: Nepal
- Zone: Karnali Zone
- District: Mugu District

Population (1991)
  - Total: 898
- Time zone: UTC+5:45 (Nepal Time)

Mugu is a village development committee in the Himalayas of Mugu District in the Karnali Zone of north-western Nepal. After Dolphu it is the second largest VDC in Mugu District which takes its name from it. It is located on the border with Tibet, China. At the time of the 1991 Nepal census it had a population of 898 people living in 181 individual households.
