= Kimari =

Kimari किमारी
- Village development committee
- Location in Nepal
- Coordinates: 29°33′0″N 82°27′30″E
- Country: Nepal
- Zone: Karnali Zone
- District: Mugu District

Population (1991)
  - Total: 743
- Time zone: UTC+5:45 (Nepal Time)

Kimari is a village development committee in Mugu District in the Karnali Zone of north-western Nepal. At the time of the 1991 Nepal census it had a population of 743 people living in 131 individual households. Most of the people are named "The Herro" or "Kimawi.
