= 2001 Fishtail Air Eurocopter AS350 crash =

Aviation accident

Coordinates: 29.5317°N 82.0765°E

Fishtail Air Eurocopter AS350
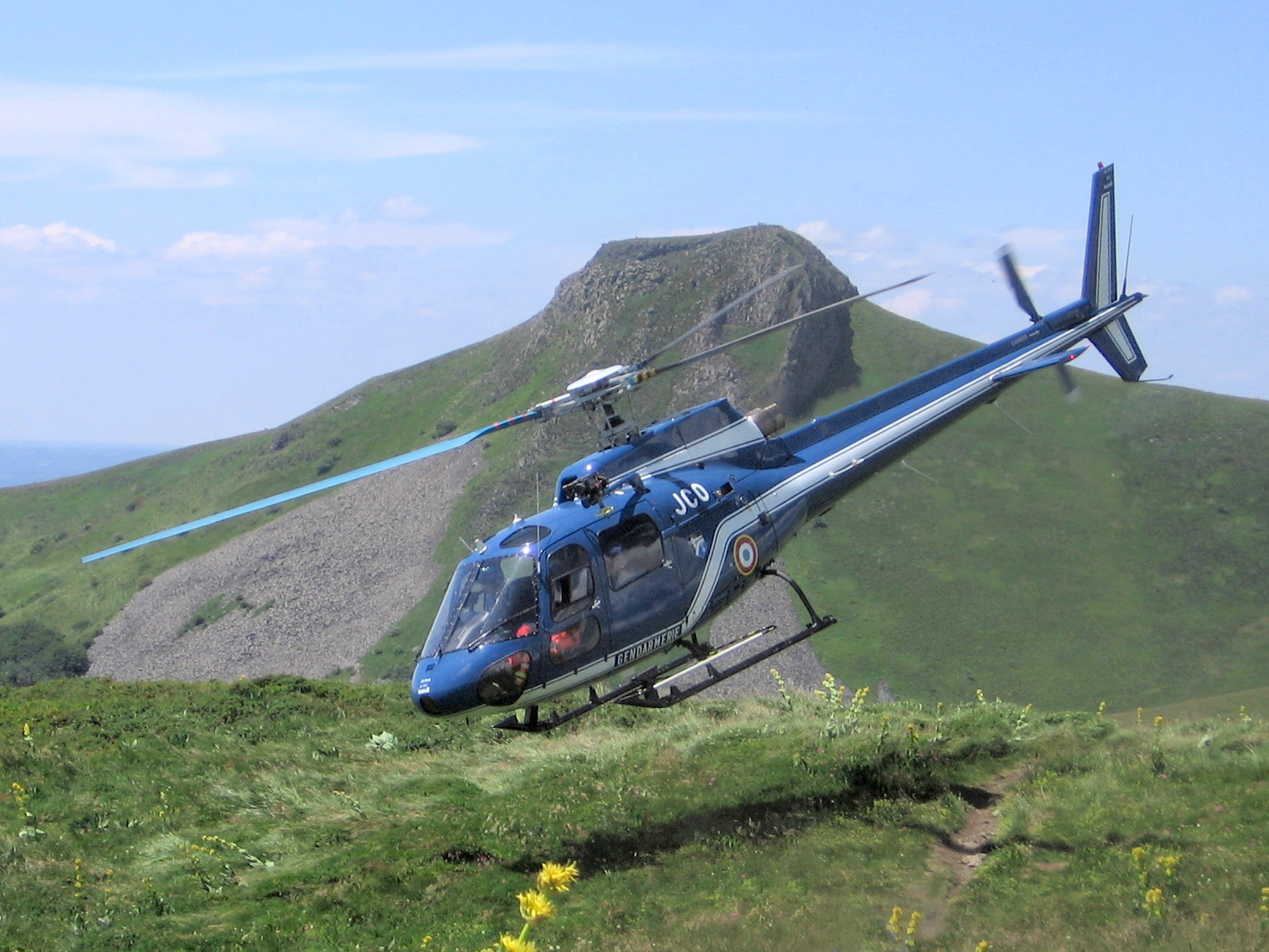
- A Eurocopter AS350, similar to the one involved in the accident

Accident
- Date: 12 November 2001
- Summary: Crashed shortly after takeoff
- Site: Rara Lake, Nepal

Aircraft
- Aircraft type: Eurocopter AS350 Écureuil
- Operator: Fishtail Air
- Registration: 9N-AFP
- Flight origin: Gamgadhi Army Base, Nepal
- Destination: Surkhet, Nepal
- Passengers: 5
- Crew: 1
- Fatalities: 4
- Injuries: 2
- Survivors: 2

The 2001 Fishtail Air Eurocopter AS350 crash occurred on 12 November 2001, when a chartered Fishtail Air Eurocopter AS350 helicopter crashed on a flight from Gamgadhi Army Base to Surkhet in Western Nepal. The accident killed all 6 passengers and crew on board, including Princess Prekshya Shah of Nepal.

== Aircraft ==
The helicopter involved with the accident was a Eurocopter AS350 Écureuil, which Princess Prekshya chartered from Nepalgunj.

== Crew and victims ==
On board the helicopter was Princess Prekshya Shah of Nepal, the younger sister of Queen Aishwarya of Nepal and Queen Komal of Nepal as well as her doctor and security personnel among other acquaintances of the Princess.

== Incident ==
The helicopter took off at 11:25 NPT on 12 November 2001 from Gamgadhi Army Base. Shortly afterwards, the helicopter plunged into Rara Lake. Two passengers were flung out of the aircraft mid air. According to the Nepali Times, the Princess asked the pilot to "circle over Rara so she could get a better view of the lake when the craft dropped down into the lake while turning".

== Investigation ==
Personnel from a nearby army base took 45 minutes to reach the crash site. Rescue helicopters were deployed and the Princess's body was recovered from the water. At first, authorities assumed that there was only one survivor, however, two passengers could be saved and were flown into hospitals in the Nepalgunj.

== Aftermath ==
In 2009, then Prime Minister of Nepal Pushpa Kamal Dahal alleged that the helicopter crash was directly linked to the Nepalese royal massacre. However, this could not be proven.
