= Pachal waterfall =

Waterfall in Nepal

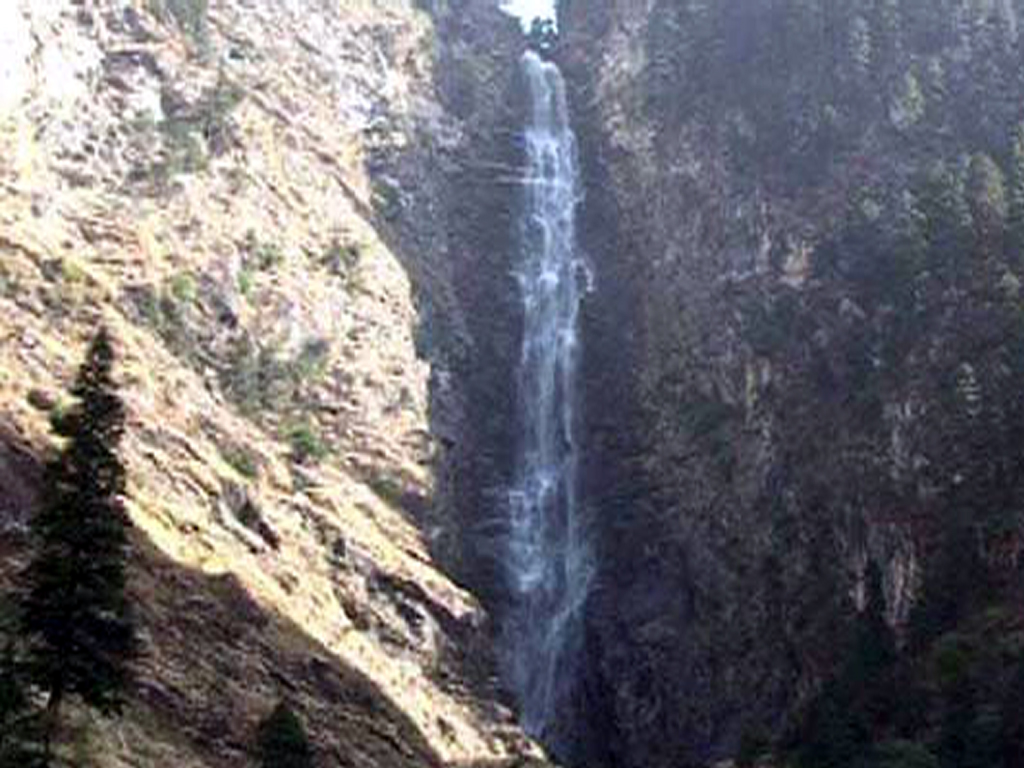

Pachal waterfall (Nepali: पचाल झरना), with fall height of 356 m (1,168 ft), is claimed to be the tallest waterfall of Nepal. The height was measured based on a GPS survey. It is located in Pachaljharna Gaupalika of Kalikot District.

The site has been declared as a centre of tourism development by the Karnali Provincial government. The village municipality is named after this waterfall.

== See also ==
- List of waterfalls
- List of waterfalls of Nepal
