= Adanchuli Rural Municipality =

Place in Nepal

Adanchuli अदानचुली गाउँपालिका
- Rural Municipality
- Location in Nepal
- Coordinates: 29.69°N 81.90°E
- Country: Nepal
- Province: Karnali Province
- District: Humla
- Wards: 6
- Established: 10 March 2017

Government
  - Type: Rural Council
  - Chairperson: Mohan Bikram Singh (NC)
  - Vice-chairperson: Karna Rokaya (Communist Party of Nepal (Maoist Centre))

Area
  - Total: 150.61 km^{2} (58.15 sq mi)

Population (2011)
  - Total: 7,116
  - Density: 47.25/km^{2} (122.4/sq mi)
- Time zone: UTC+5:45 (NST)
- Headquarter: Srinagar
- Website: adanchulimun.gov.np

Adanchuli (Nepali: अदानचुली गाउँपालिका) is a rural municipality located in Humla District of Karnali Province of Nepal.

The rural municipality is divided into total 6 wards and the headquarters of the rural municipality is situated at Srinagar.

== Demographics ==
At the time of the 2011 Nepal census, 99.8% of the population in Adanchuli Rural Municipality spoke Nepali as their first language; 0.2% spoke other languages.

In terms of ethnicity/caste, 51.0% were Chhetri, 18.4% Kami, 14.5% Thakuri, 5.5% Damai/Dholi, 5.2% Hill Brahmin, 3.6% Sarki, 1.6% Magar and 0.3% Gurung.

In terms of religion, 99.3% were Hindu, 0.7% Christian and 0.1% Buddhist.
