= Seri, Mugu =

Seri सेरी
- Village Development Committee
- Location in Nepal
- Coordinates: 29°31′0″N 81°58′0″E
- Country: Nepal
- Zone: Karnali Zone
- District: Mugu District

Population (1991)
  - Total: 1,464
- Time zone: UTC+5:45 (Nepal Time)

Seri (Nepali: सरी) is a Village Development Committee in Mugu District in the Karnali Zone of north-western Nepal. At the time of the 2012 Nepal census it had a population of 2307 people residing in 384 individual households.
