= Chhapre =

Chhapre छाप्रे
- Village development committee
- Location in Nepal
- Coordinates: 29°9′0″N 81°46′0″E
- Country: Nepal
- Zone: Karnali Zone
- District: Kalikot District

Population (1991)
  - Total: 2,494
- Time zone: UTC+5:45 (Nepal Time)

Chhapre is a village development committee in Kalikot District in the Karnali Zone of north-western Nepal. At the time of the 1991 Nepal census it had a population of 2,494 people living in 506 individual households.
