= Gela, Nepal =

Gela गेला
- Village development committee
- Location in Nepal
- Coordinates: 29°3′45″N 81°43′0″E
- Country: Nepal
- Zone: Karnali Zone
- District: Kalikot District

Population (1991)
  - Total: 2,685
- Time zone: UTC+5:45 (Nepal Time)

Gela is a village development committee in Kalikot District in the Karnali Zone of north-western Nepal. At the time of the 1991 Nepal census it had a population of 2685 people living in 496 individual households.
