= Khatyad Rural Municipality =

Rural municipality in Karnali Province, Nepal

Khatyad (Nepali: खत्याड गाउँपालिका) is a rural municipality located in Mugu District of Karnali Province of Nepal.

== Demographics ==
At the time of the 2011 Nepal census, Khatyad Rural Municipality had a population of 17,146. Of these, 99.9% spoke Nepali and 0.1% other languages as their first language.

In terms of ethnicity/caste, 55.7% were Chhetri, 12.5% Thakuri, 9.1% other Dalit, 8.3% Hill Brahmin, 7.2% Kami, 1.6% Damai/Dholi, 1.5% Bhote, 1.5% Sanyasi/Dasnami, 1.1% Tamang and 1.5% others.

In terms of religion, 98.3% were Hindu, 1.5% Buddhist, 0.1% Christian and 0.1% others.
