= Srinagar, Mugu =

Srinagar श्रीनगर
- Village development committee
- Location in Nepal
- Coordinates: 29°33′0″N 82°8′0″E
- Country: Nepal
- Zone: Karnali Zone
- District: Mugu District

Population (1991)
  - Total: 2,256
- Time zone: UTC+5:45 (Nepal Time)

Srinagar is a village development committee in Mugu District in the Karnali Zone of north-western Nepal. The district capital of Gamgadhi is located within it. At the time of the 1991 Nepal census it had a population of 2256 people living in 411 individual households.
