= Pina, Nepal =

Pina पिना
- Village development committee
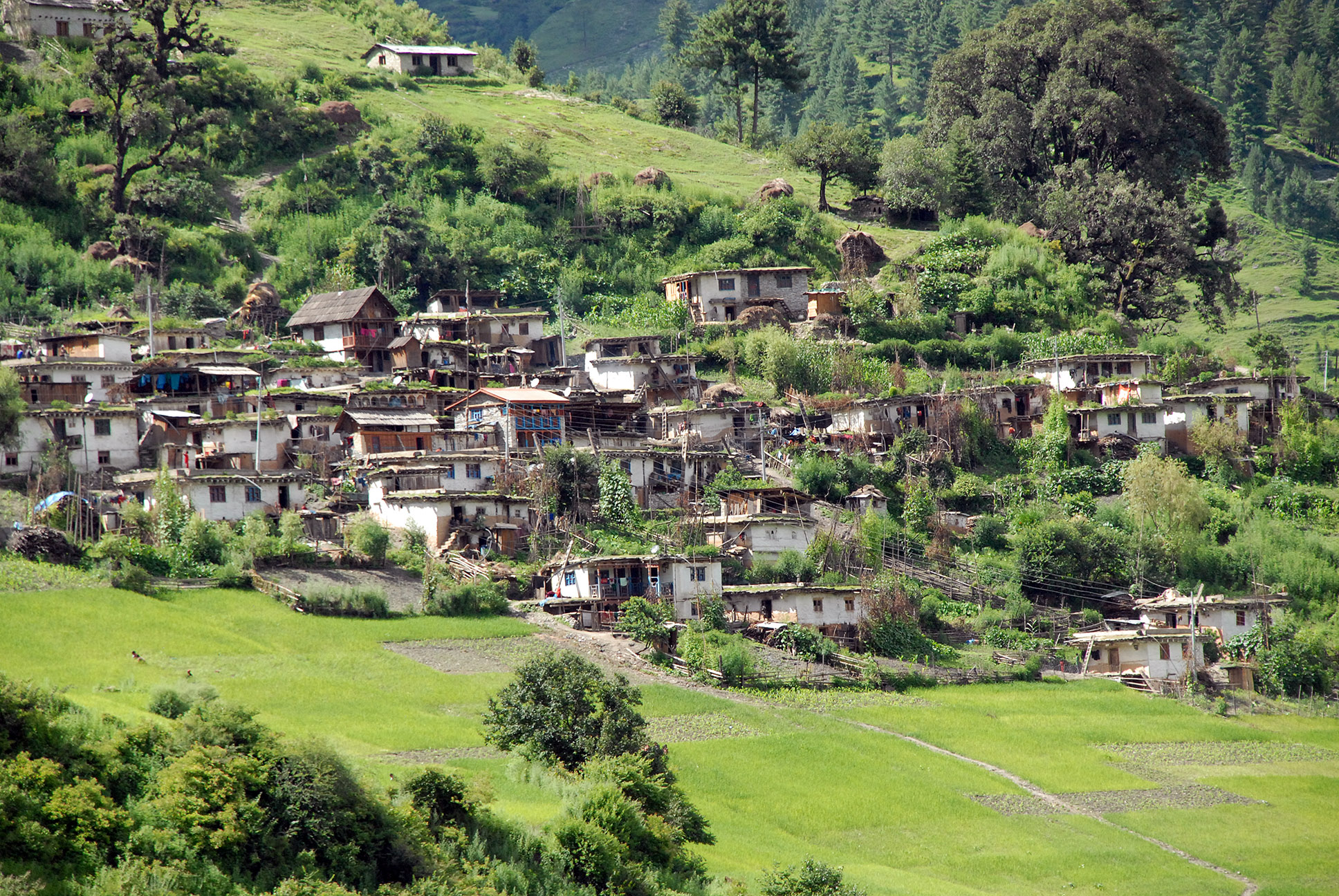

- Location in Nepal
- Coordinates: 29°27′0″N 82°9′0″E
- Country: Nepal
- Zone: Karnali Zone
- District: Mugu District

Population (1991)
  - Total: 2,479
- Time zone: UTC+5:45 (Nepal Time)

Pina is a village development committee in Mugu District in the Karnali Zone of north-western Nepal. At the time of the 1991 Nepal census it had a population of 2479 people living in 449 individual households.
