= Sipkhana =

Sipkhana सिपखाना Laharela
- Village development committee
- Location in Nepal
- Country: Nepal
- Zone: Karnali Zone
- District: Kalikot District

Population (2012)
  - Total: 10,000
- Time zone: UTC+5:45 (Nepal Time)

Sipkhana is a village development committee in Kalikot District in the Karnali Zone of north-western Nepal. At the time of the 2012 Nepal census it had a population of 10,000 people living in 1,200 individual households.
