= Rowa =

Rowa रोवा
- Village development committee
- Location in Nepal
- Coordinates: 29°30′0″N 82°15′0″E
- Country: Nepal
- Zone: Karnali Zone
- District: Mugu District

Population (1991)
  - Total: 2,771
- Time zone: UTC+5:45 (Nepal Time)

Rowa is a village development committee in Mugu District in the Karnali Zone of north-western Nepal. At the time of the 1991 Nepal census it had a population of 2771 people living in 523 individual households.
