= Ruga, Nepal =

Ruga रुगा
- Village development committee
- Location in Nepal
- Coordinates: 29°35′0″N 82°32′0″E
- Country: Nepal
- Zone: Karnali Zone
- District: Mugu District

Population (1991)
  - Total: 2,371
- Time zone: UTC+5:45 (Nepal Time)

Ruga is a village development committee in Mugu District in the Karnali Zone of north-western Nepal. At the time of the 1991 Nepal census it had a population of 2371 people living in 465 individual households.
