= Lalu, Nepal =

Lalu लालू
- Village development committee
- Location in Nepal
- Coordinates: 29°8′0″N 81°32′0″E
- Country: Nepal
- Zone: Karnali Zone
- District: Kalikot District

Population (1991)
  - Total: 4,067
- Time zone: UTC+5:45 (Nepal Time)

Lalu is a former village development committee in Kalikot District in the Karnali Zone of north-western Nepal. At the time of the 1991 Nepal census it had a population of 4067 people living in 695 individual households.
