= Princess Prekshya of Nepal =

Princess of Nepal (1952–2001)

Prekshya Rajya Lakshmi Devi Shah प्रेक्षा राज्य लक्ष्मी देवी
- Born: 19 January 1952; Kathmandu, Nepal
- Died: 12 November 2001 (aged 49); Rara, Nepal (2001 Fishtail Air Eurocopter AS350 crash)
- Spouse: Prince Dhirendra of Nepal (m. 1972; died 2001)
- Issue: Princess Puja; Princess Dilasha; Princess Sitashma
- House: Rana (by birth); Shah (by marriage)
- Father: Kendra Shumsher Jang Bahadur Rana
- Mother: Shree Rajya Lakshmi Devi Shah
- Religion: Hinduism

Prekshya Rajya Lakshmi Devi Shah (Nepali: प्रेक्षा राज्य लक्ष्मी देवी; 19 January 1952 – 12 November 2001) was a Princess of Nepal by marriage, who died in a helicopter accident in Rara Lake along with three other passengers.

== Life ==
Princess Prekshya was the younger sister of Queen Aishwarya of Nepal and Queen Komal of Nepal. She was educated at St Mary's School, Jawalakhel; St Helen's Convent, Kurseong; and Tribhuvan University.

Prekshya married her second cousin Prince Dhirendra, a brother of King Birendra at Kathmandu, on 13 February 1972. Prekshya and Dhirendra had three daughters:

- Princess Puja Rajya Lakshmi Devi Shahi of Nepal (born 24 March 1977), married Captain Dr Rajiv Raj Shahi in 1998. She had children;
- Princess Dilasha Rajya Lakshmi Devi Rana of Nepal (born 4 August 1979), married in 2003 Kumar Adarsha Bikram Rana. She had children;
- Princess Sitashma Rajya Lakshmi Devi Shah of Nepal (born 11 May 1981), married Abinesh Shah in 2003. She had children.

Prekshya did not get along with her husband. She and Dhirendra separated when he renounced the style of Royal Highness, which Prekshya did not. They did not divorce, but Dhirendra went to live in London with an English woman who became his partner and has a daughter still alive in London.

Dhirendra was killed in the Nepalese royal massacre on 1 June 2001; Prekshya did not attend the event due to back problems. She died on 12 November 2001, in a helicopter crash five months after the massacre: she was returning to Nepal on the helicopter when the helicopter crashed into Lake Rara; her lifeless body was found in the waters of the lake. Her body was later transported to Kathmandu for cremation. After her death, Prime Minister Pushpa Kamal Dahal declared that there was a link between the royal massacre and Prekshya's death.

== Patronages ==
- Member of Raj Sabha (The King's Council) (1977).
- Co-Chief of the Scout Movement of Nepal (1975).

== Styles ==
- Lady Prekshya Rajya Lakshmi Devi (1952–1972).
- HRH Princess Prekshya Rajya Lakshmi Devi Shah of Nepal (1972–2001).

== Honours ==
=== National honours ===
- Member of the Order of the Gurkha Right Hand, 1st class (1975).
- Member of the Order of the Three Divine Powers, 1st class (23 October 2001).
- King Birendra Investiture Medal (24 February 1975).

=== Foreign honours ===
- Honorary Dame Grand Cross of the Royal Victorian Order (GCVO, 17 February 1986).
