= Pulu, Nepal =

Pulu पुलु
- Village development committee
- Location in Nepal
- Coordinates: 29°35′0″N 82°23′30″E
- Country: Nepal
- Zone: Karnali Zone
- District: Mugu District

Population (1991)
  - Total: 909
- Time zone: UTC+5:45 (Nepal Time)

Pulu is a village development committee in Mugu District in the Karnali Zone of north-western Nepal. At the time of the 1991 Nepal census it had a population of 909 people living in 171 individual households.
