= Sukitaya =

Sukatiya सुकाटिया राराकाटिया
- Village development committee
- Nickname: राराकाटिया
- Location in Nepal
- Coordinates: 29°4′30″N 81°38′0″E
- Country: Nepal
- Zone: Karnali Zone
- District: Kalikot District

Population (1991)
  - Total: 3,207
- Time zone: UTC+5:45 (Nepal Time)

Sukitaya is a village development committee in Kalikot District in the Karnali Zone of north-western Nepal. At the time of the 1991 Nepal census it had a population of 3207 people living in 593 individual households.
