= Karmarong dialect =

Mugom–Karmarong dialect of Nepal

Karmarong
- Native to: Nepal
- Ethnicity: Karmarong
- Native speakers: 2,619 (2021 census)
- Language family: Sino-Tibetan: Tibeto-Burman; Tibeto-Kanauri; Bodish; Central Bodish; Central Tibetic; Mugom–Karmarong; Karmarong

Language codes
- ISO 639-3: None (mis)
- Glottolog: kara1471 Karani
- Coordinates: 29.588920, 82.447829

Karmarong language, also known as Karmai kat or Kar-ket, is the Sino-Tibetan language of the Karmarong people (Tibetan) of Mugu district in Nepal.

== Language name ==
Karmarong speakers self-identify as "Karmarong," and are referred to as "Karani" by non-Tibetan peoples of the area. Karmarong speakers often refer to their language in general terms such as "Bhote" or "Tibetan." However, when asked the name for their specific native tongue, they use "Karmarong" or "Karmai kat."

== Speakers ==
Karmarong is spoken by roughly 2,600 people originating from twelve villages along the Mugu Karnali River in Mugum Karmarong Rural Municipality. The language is specifically associated with Karmarong Tibetan people. Diaspora communities of Karmarong can be found in the neighboring districts of Jumla, in the capital city of Kathmandu (Bouddha), and in Manali, India.

== Language vitality ==
In 2021, a sociolinguistic study found that Karmarong speakers use their language in the domains of daily life and interaction with their own people. It was also discovered that Karmarong is being transmitted to children in the villages. The Ethnologue has assigned EGIDS level 6a "vigorous" to the Mugom–Karmarong (ISO 639-3: muk). This level denotes oral use of Karmarong is stable, and that the speaker population is not decreasing.

== Resources ==
- Karmarong primer: The Illumination of the Karmarong Language and Writing: Book 1
- Karmarong primer: The Illumination of the Karmarong Language and Writing: Book 2
- Sociolinguistic study: Isensee, Jonathan Paul. (2022). Documentation and Vitality Assessment of the Karmarong Language. Kathmandu: Tribhuvan University.
- Lexicon of Karmarong Language: Appendix A of Isensee (2022) (Tibetan, Devanagari, and IPA)
