= Soru Rural Municipality =

Rural municipality in Karnali Province, Nepal

Soru (Nepali: सोरु गाउँपालिका) is a rural municipality located in Mugu District of Karnali Province of Nepal.

== Demographics ==
At the time of the 2011 Nepal census, Soru Rural Municipality had a population of 12,260. Of these, 99.9% spoke Nepali 0.1% Maithili as their first language.

In terms of ethnicity/caste, 34.8% were Chhetri, 31.9% Thakuri, 9.6% Hill Brahmin, 9.1% other Dalit, 3.6% Sanyasi/Dasnami, 3.2% Kami, 3.1% Damai/Dholi, 1.7% Sarki, 1.1% Kumal and 1.9% others.

In terms of religion, 99.9% were Hindu and 0.1% Christian and 0.2% others.
