= Kotbada =

Kotbada कोटबाडा
- Village development committee
- Location in Nepal
- Coordinates: 29°8′30″N 81°35′0″E
- Country: Nepal
- Zone: Karnali Zone
- District: Kalikot District

Population (2001)
  - Total: 5,893
- Time zone: UTC+5:45 (Nepal Time)

Kotbada is a village development committee in Kalikot District in the Karnali Zone of north-western Nepal. At the time of the 2001 Nepal census it had a population of 5893 people living in 854 individual households.
