= Kumalgaun =

Kumalgaun कुमालगाउँ
- Village development committee
- Location in Nepal
- Coordinates: 29°10′0″N 81°33′45″E
- Country: Nepal
- Zone: Karnali Zone
- District: Kalikot District

Population (1991)
  - Total: 2,617
- Time zone: UTC+5:45 (Nepal Time)

Kumalgaun is a village development committee in Kalikot District in the Karnali Zone of north-western Nepal. At the time of the 1991 Nepal census it had a population of 2617 people living in 413 individual households.
