= Dolphu =

Village development committee in Karnali Zone, Nepal

Dolphu डोल्फू
- Village development committee
- Location in Nepal
- Coordinates: 29°45′0″N 82°45′0″E
- Country: Nepal
- Zone: Karnali Zone
- District: Mugu District

Population (1991)
  - Total: 573
- Time zone: UTC+5:45 (Nepal Time)

Dolphu is a village development committee in Mugu District in the Karnali Zone of north-western Nepal. It is the largest VDC in the district located in the east and borders Tibet, China. At the time of the 1991 Nepal census it had a population of 573 people living in 125 individual households.
