= Rara, Nepal =

Rara रारा
- Village development committee
- Location in Nepal
- Coordinates: 29°33′0″N 82°3′0″E
- Country: Nepal
- Zone: Karnali Zone
- District: Mugu District

Population (1991)
  - Total: 930
- Time zone: UTC+5:45 (Nepal Time)

Rara is a village development committee (VDC) in Mugu District in the Karnali Zone of north-western Nepal. At the time of the 1991 Nepal census, it had a population of 930, living in 199 individual households.

Rara Lake lies in the eastern part of the VDC.
