= Marta, Nepal =

Bharta भर्ता
- Village development committee
- Location in Nepal
- Coordinates: 29°5′0″N 81°35′0″E
- Country: Nepal
- Zone: Karnali Zone
- District: Kalikot district

Population (1991)
  - Total: 4,008
- Time zone: UTC+5:45 (Nepal Time)

Bharta is a village development committee in Kalikot district in the Karnali Zone of north-western Nepal. At the time of the 1991 Nepal census it had a population of 4008 people living in 754 individual households.
