= Srinagar, Humla =

Srinagar श्रीनगर
- Location in Nepal
- Coordinates: 29.69°N 81.90°E
- Country: Nepal
- Zone: Karnali Zone
- District: Humla District

Population (1991)
  - Total: 2,608
- Time zone: UTC+5:45 (Nepal Time)

Srinagar is a Village Development Committee in Humla District in the Karnali Zone of north-western Nepal. At the time of the 1991 Nepal census it had a population of 2608 persons living in 426 individual households.
