= Mumra, Astrakhan Oblast =

Mumra Мумра
- Selo
- Location within Astrakhan Oblast Location within Russia
- Coordinates: 45°46′N 47°39′E
- Country: Russia
- Region: Astrakhan Oblast
- District: Ikryaninsky District
- Time zone: UTC+4:00

Mumra (Russian: Мумра) is a rural locality (a selo) and the administrative center of Mumrinsky Selsoviet in Ikryaninsky District, Astrakhan Oblast, Russia. The population was 2,372 as of 2010. There are 49 streets.

== Geography ==
Mumra is located 46 km south of Ikryanoye (the district's administrative centre) by road. Zyuzino is the nearest rural locality.
