= Manma =

Manma मान्म
- Municipality
- Location in Nepal
- Coordinates: 29°9′0″N 81°37′0″E
- Country: Nepal
- Zone: Karnali Zone
- District: Kalikot District

Population (2011)
  - Total: 9,094
- Time zone: UTC+5:45 (Nepal Time)

Manma (Nepali: मान्मा) is the district headquarter of Kalikot District in Karnali Province, Nepal, a landlocked country of South Asia. The town is located at 29°8'60N 81°37'0E and has an altitude of 2033 metres.

At the time of the 1991 Nepal census it had a population of 4409 people residing in 877 individual households.

== Media ==
To Promote local culture Manma has one FM radio station Radio Malika - 102.8 MHz Which is a Community radio Station.

== See also ==
- Nepal
- Kalikot District
