= Malkot =

Coordinates: 33°57′0″N 73°21′7″E

- Village
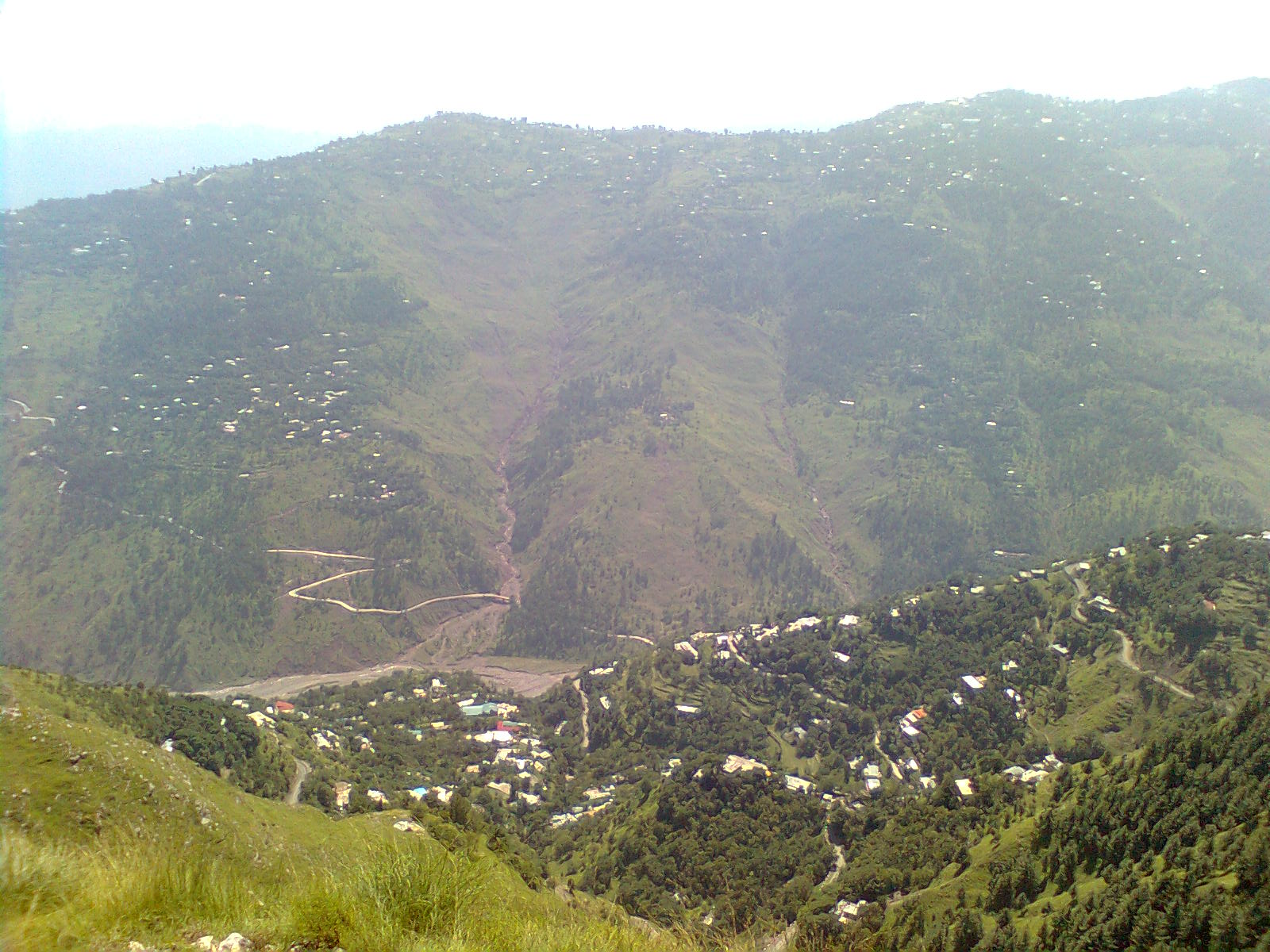
- Malkot village
- Country: Pakistan
- Region: Khyber Pakhtunkhwa
- District: Abbottabad

Malkot is a village of Abbottabad District in Khyber-Pakhtunkhwa province of Pakistan. Under the local government reforms of 2000 it became a Union Council of Abbottabad District, it is now part of Palak Union Council. Malkot is located at 33° 59' 37N 73° 26' 46E in the south-eastern part of Abbottabad District.

According to the 2023 census it had a total population of 4,046 of which 1,984 were male and 2,062 female, the literacy rate for those aged 10+ was recorded as 93.5% - 96.4% for male and 90.6% for females.
