= Gamgadhi =

Gamgadhi गमगढी
- Village Development Committee
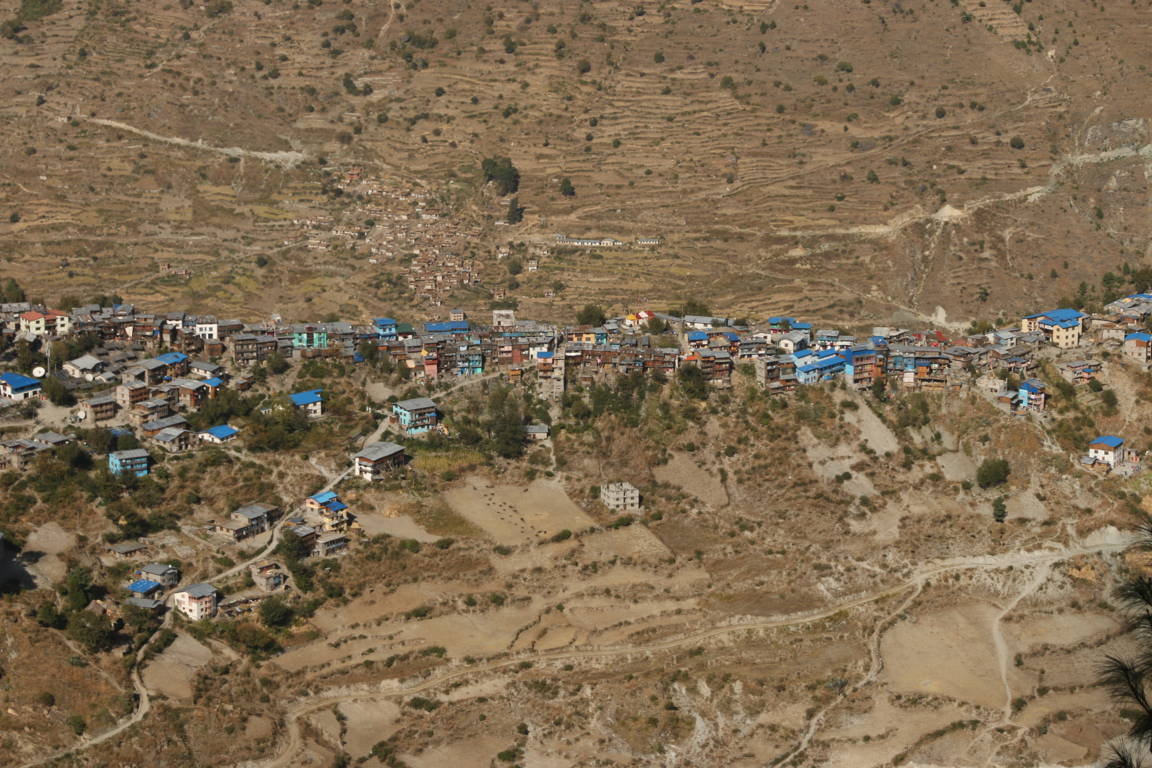

- Location in Nepal
- Coordinates: 29°33′0″N 82°10′0″E
- Country: Nepal
- Zone: Karnali Zone
- District: Mugu District
- Time zone: UTC+5:45 (Nepal Time)

Gamgadhi is the headquarters of Mugu District in the Karnali Zone of northern Nepal. It lies in province 6 of the seven provinces of Nepal.

== Media ==
To Promote local culture Gamgadhi has one FM radio station Radio Mugu - 107.4 MHz Which is a Community radio Station.

== See also ==
- 2021 Mugu bus accident
