= Kalikot District =

Coordinates: 29°9′0″N 81°37′0″E

Kalikot District कालीकोट जिल्ला
- District
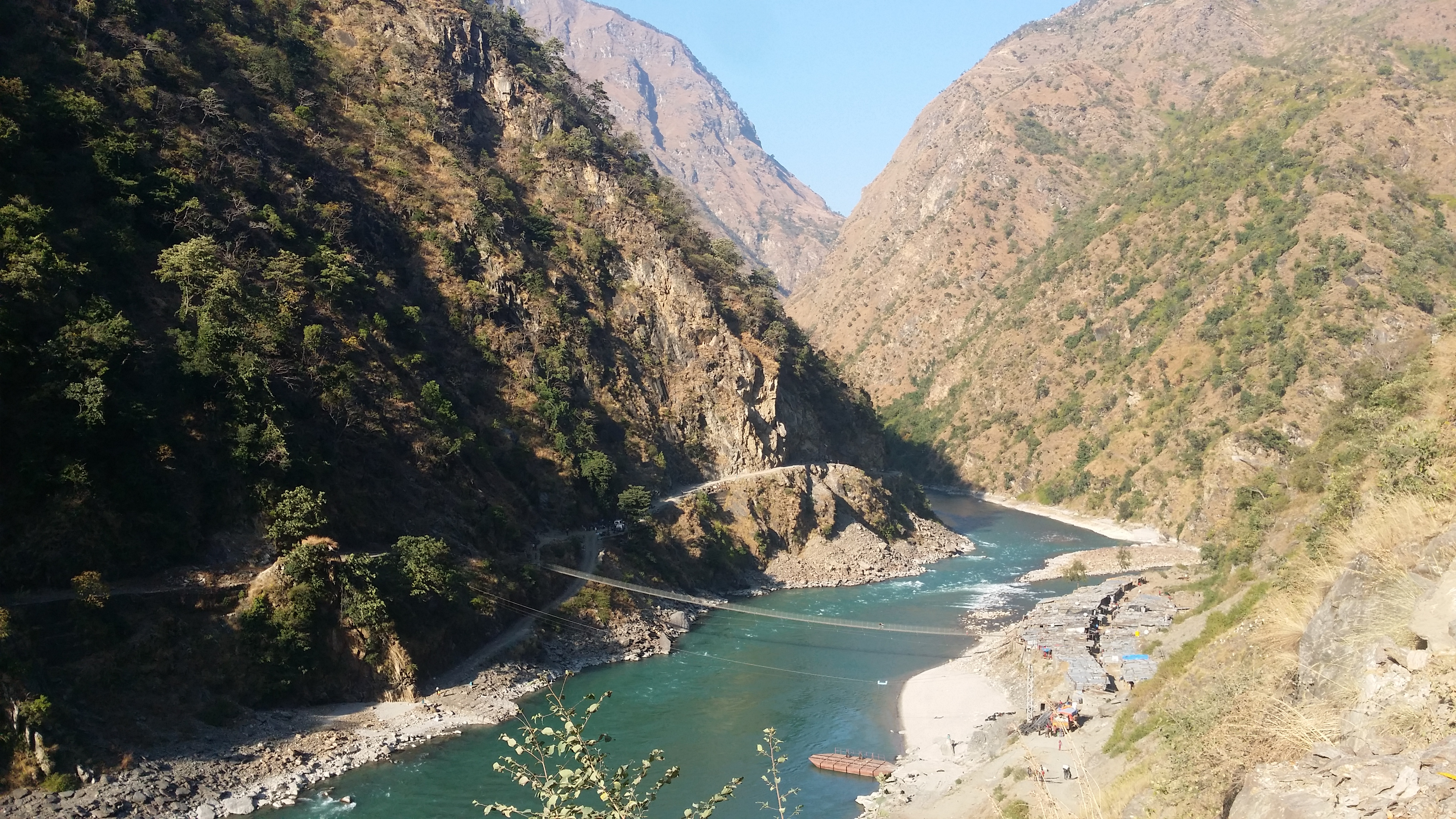
- Pachal waterfall Jite Gadhi over the Karnali in Kalikot district
- Nickname: त्रिबेणी Tribeņī
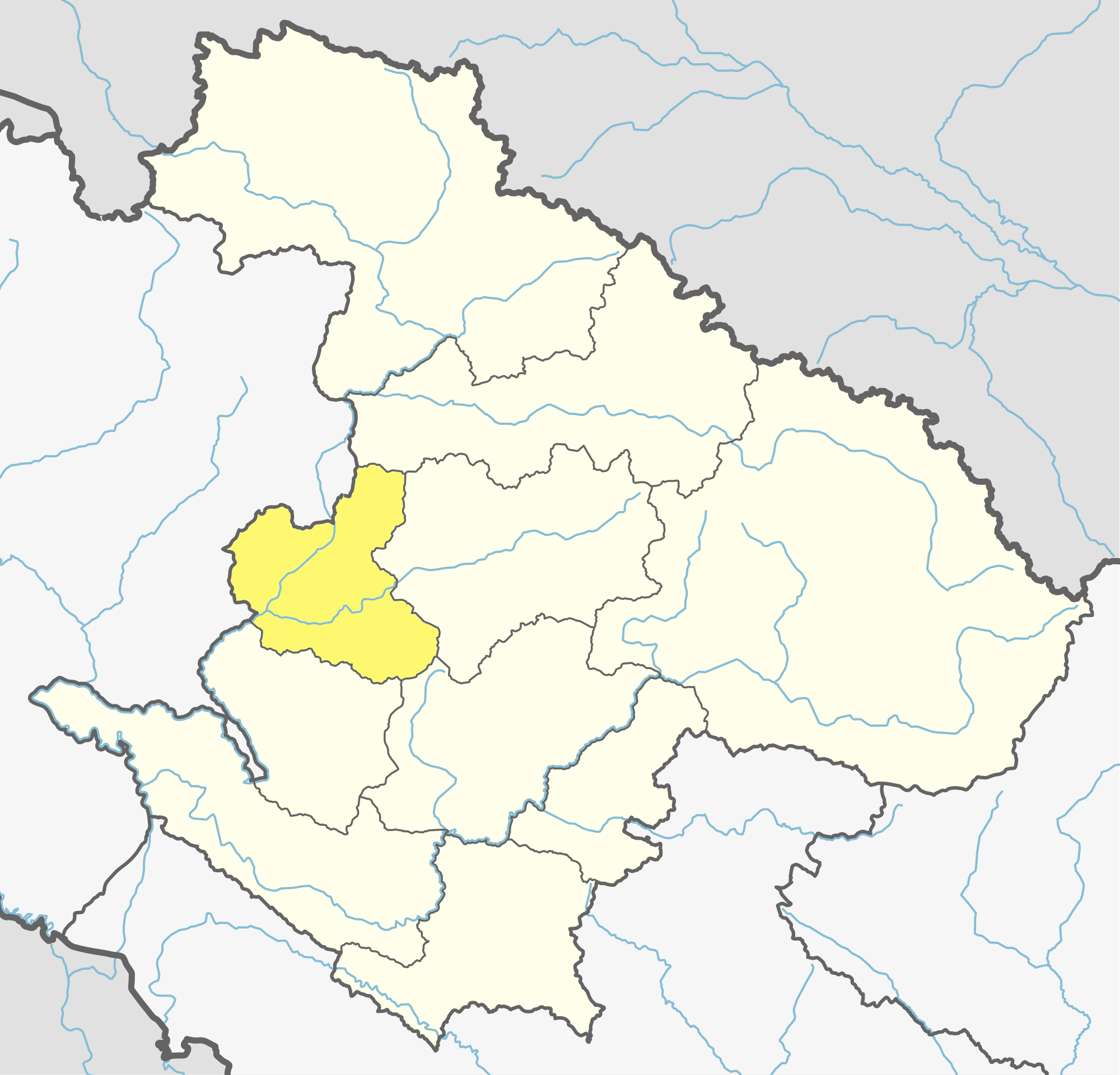
- Location of Kalikot District (dark yellow) in Karnali
- Country: Nepal
- Province: Karnali Province
- Admin HQ.: Manma (today part of Khandachakra Municipality)

Government
  - Type: Coordination committee
  - Body: DCC, Kalikot

Area
  - Total: 1,741 km^{2} (672 sq mi)

Population (2011)
  - Total: 136,948
  - Density: 78.66/km^{2} (203.7/sq mi)
- Time zone: UTC+05:45 (NPT)
- Website: ddckalikot.gov.np

Kalikot District (Nepali: कालीकोट जिल्ला), a part of Karnali province, is one of the seventy-seven districts of Nepal. The district, with Manma as its district headquarters, covers an area of 1,741 km^{2} (672 sq mi), had a population of 105,580 in 2001 and 136,948 in 2011. In September 2005, in a bid to encourage a change in social attitudes, the government announced that it would provide rice to any family that had recently had a girl born.

== Geography and Climate ==
| Climate Zone | Elevation Range | % of Area |
|---|---|---|
| Upper Tropical | 300 to 1,000 meters 1,000 to 3,300 ft. | 1.8% |
| Subtropical | 1,000 to 2,000 meters 3,300 to 6,600 ft. | 20.6% |
| Temperate | 2,000 to 3,000 meters 6,400 to 9,800 ft. | 39.4% |
| Subalpine | 3,000 to 4,000 meters 9,800 to 13,100 ft. | 37.3% |
| Alpine | 4,000 to 5,000 meters 13,100 to 16,400 ft. | 0.8% |

== Demographics ==
Historical population
| Census year | Pop. | ±% p.a. |
|---|---|---|
| 1981 | 87,638 | — |
| 1991 | 88,805 | +0.13% |
| 2001 | 105,580 | +1.75% |
| 2011 | 136,948 | +2.64% |
| 2021 | 144,917 | +0.57% |
Source: Citypopulation

At the time of the 2021 Nepal census, Kalikot District had a population of 145,292. 11.43% of the population is under 5 years of age. It has a literacy rate of 72.72% and a sex ratio of 1011 females per 1000 males. 55,896 (38.47%) lived in municipalities.

Castes/ethnic groups in Kalikot district (2021)
1. Chhetri (29.6%)
2. Thakuri (24.5%)
3. Kami (18.7%)
4. Bahun (15.2%)
5. Damai (5.61%)
6. Sarki (3.91%)
7. Dasnami (0.91%)
8. Hill Janjati (1.30%)
9. Others (0.25%)

Khas people make up a majority of the population with 98% of the population. Khas Dalits make up 28% of the population. Hill Janjatis, mainly Magars, make up 1% of the population.

Languages of Kalikot district (2021)
1. Nepali (73.2%)
2. Khash (26.2%)
3. Others (0.59%)

At the time of the 2021 census, 73.24% of the population spoke Nepali and 26.17% Khash as their first language. Khash is the dialect of Nepali spoken in Karnali Province. In 2011, 99.5% of the population spoke Nepali as their first language.

Hinduism is the predominant religion, practiced by 99.79% of the population.

== Administration ==
The district consists of nine municipalities, out of which three are urban municipalities and six are rural municipalities. These are as follows:

- Khandachakra Municipality
- Raskot Municipality
- Tilagufa Municipality
- Pachaljharana Rural Municipality
- Sanni Triveni Rural Municipality
- Narharinath Rural Municipality
- Shubha Kalika Rural Municipality
- Mahawai Rural Municipality
- Palata Rural Municipality

=== Former Village Development Committees ===
Prior to the restructuring of the district, Kalikot District consisted of the following municipalities and Village development committees:

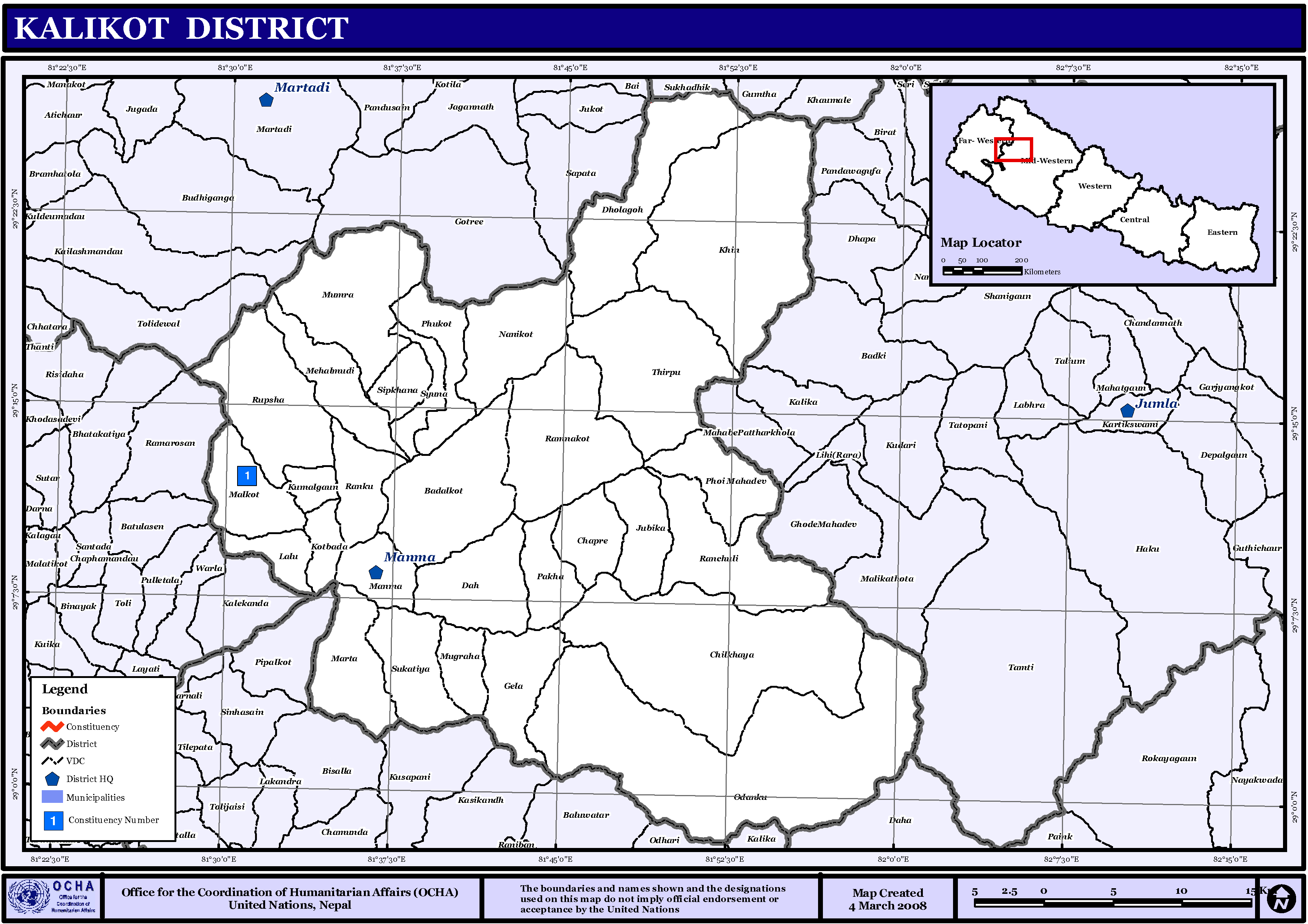
Map of the VDCs in Kalikot District

- Badalkot
- Bharta
- Chhapre
- Chilkhaya
- Daha
- Dholagohe
- Gela
- Jubitha
- Khin
- Kotbada
- Kumalgaun
- Lalu
- Malkot
- Manma
- Mehalmudi
- Mugraha
- Mumra
- Nanikot
- Odanaku
- Pakha
- Phoi Mahadev
- Phukot
- Ranku
- Ramnakot
- Ranchuli
- Rupsa
- Sipkhana
- Sukitaya
- Syuna
- Thirpu

== See also ==
- Zones of Nepal
- Paudhur
- List of natural monuments in Kalikot
