= Mugu District =

Coordinates: 29°33′N 82°10′E

Mugu District मुगु
- District
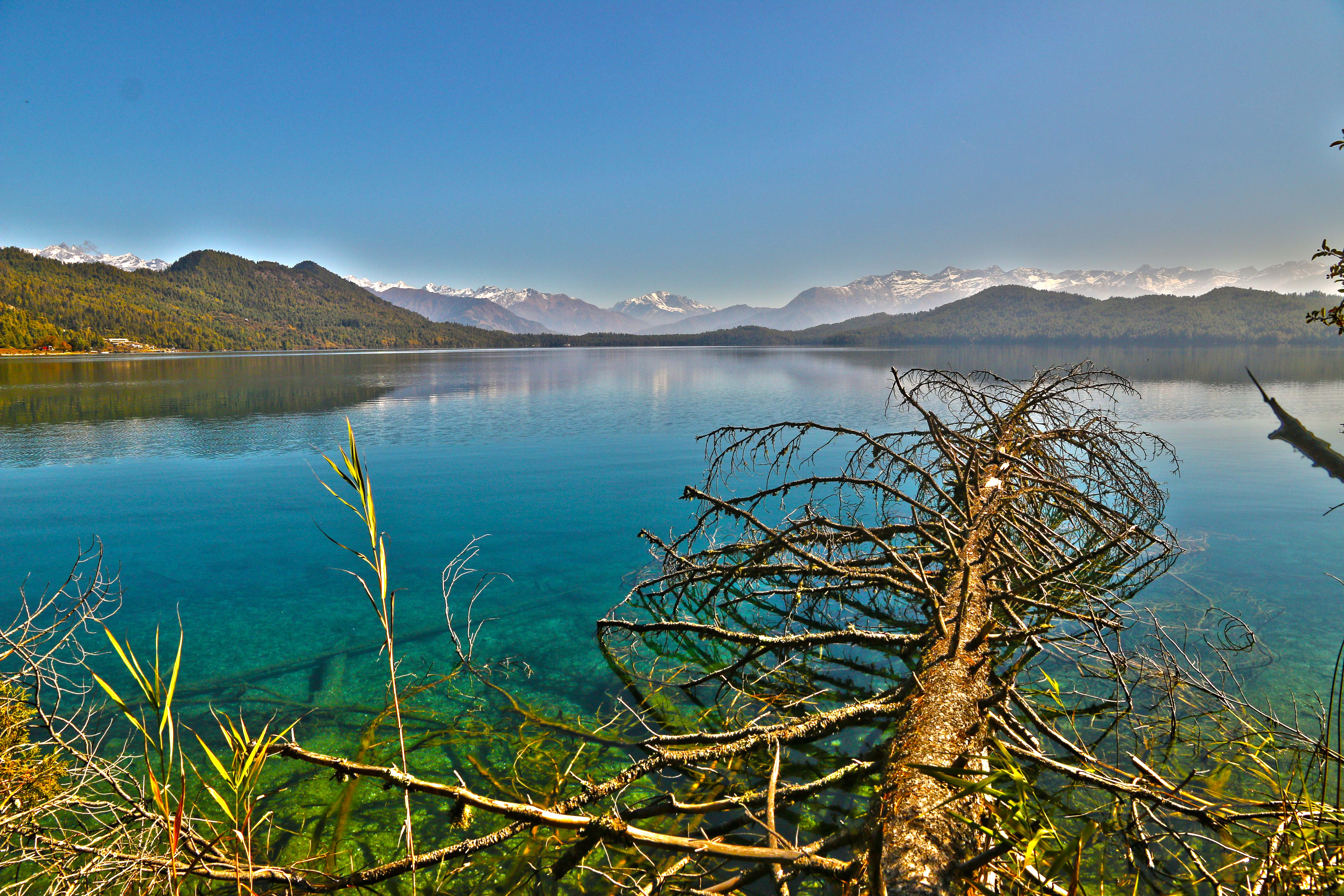
- Rara Lake

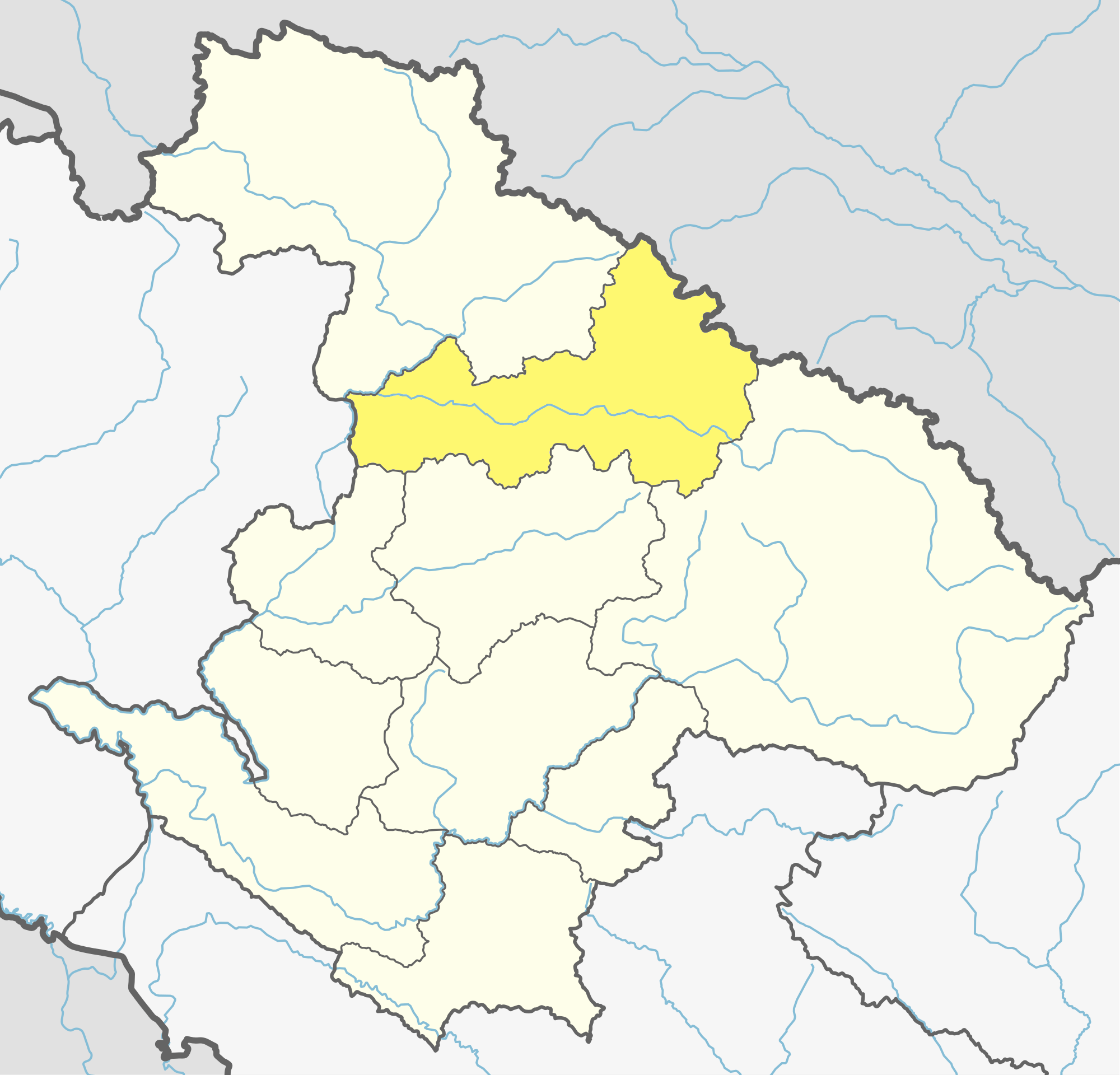
- Location of Mugu District (dark yellow) in Karnali
- Country: Nepal
- Province: Karnali Province
- Admin HQ.: Gamgadhi (today part of Chhayanath Rara Municipality)

Government
  - Type: Coordination committee
  - Body: DCC, Mugu

Area
  - Total: 3,535 km^{2} (1,365 sq mi)

Population (2011)
  - Total: 55,286
  - Density: 15.64/km^{2} (40.51/sq mi)
- Time zone: UTC+05:45 (NPT)
- Website: ddcmugu.gov.np

Mugu District (Nepali: मुगु जिल्ला), a part of Karnali Province, is one of the seventy-seven districts of Nepal. The district, with Gamgadhi as its district headquarters, covers an area of 3,535 km^{2} (1,365 sq mi) and had a population (2011) of 55,286. Mugu is known for being both the most remote district in Nepal, as well as the least developed.

== Geography and climate ==
Mugu's geography is very rugged. The biggest lake in Nepal, Rara Lake, also known as Mahendra Daha, lies in Mugu District. It is one of the biggest districts of Nepal.

Pulu is one of the more well-known villages of the Mugu district. Formerly, Pulu was a village development committee (VDC), which were local-level administrative units. In 2017, the government of Nepal restructured local government in line with the 2015 constitution and VDCs were discontinued. Similarly, Seri is another prominent village of the district, which was also a VDC prior to the new arrangements for local administration. There are several other villages nearby, including Riusa, Mooh, Mangri, Serog, and Dawra.

Climate zone	Elevation range	% of area
Subtropical	1,000 to 2,000 meters 3,300 to 6,600 ft.	5.6%
Temperate	2,000 to 3,000 meters 6,400 to 9,800 ft.	19.3%
Subalpine	3,000 to 4,000 meters 9,800 to 13,100 ft.	20.6%
Alpine	4,000 to 5,000 meters 13,100 to 16,400 ft.	17.7%
Nival	above 5,000 meters	5.3%
Trans-Himalayan	3,000 to 6,400 meters 9,800 to 21,000 ft.	31.2%

=== Tourism ===
The remote Mugu district is rich in natural resources. Nepal's largest Rara Lake lies in this district. Many domestic and international tourists come to visit the famous and beautiful Rara Lake. The lake is also known as the Mahendra Tal. The Lake lies at an elevation of 2,990 meters and covers about 10.8 km^{2} (4.2 sq mi) of area. The Rara National Park protects and surrounds it.Mugu is known as underdeveloped district of Nepal.

== Demographics ==
At the time of the 2011 Nepal census, Mugu District had a population of 55,286.

As first language, 92.4% spoke Nepali, 6.7% Tamang, 0.8% Sherpa and 0.1% other languages as their first language.

Ethnicity/caste: 48.9% were Chhetri, 15.4% Thakuri, 9.5% Kami, 7.9% Khampa/Tamang, 5.9% other Dalit, 5.2% Hill Brahmin, 3.2% Damai/Dholi, 1.3% Sanyasi/Dasnami, 0.9% Sarki, 0.6% Bhote, 0.3% Kumal, 0.2% Lohar, 0.2% Newar, 0.1% Badi, 0.1% other Terai and 0.2% others.

Religion: 91.6% were Hindu, 8.1% Buddhist, 0.2% Christian and 0.1% others.

Literacy: 50.8% could read and write, 4.7% could only read and 44.4% could neither read nor write.

Historical population
Census year	Pop.	±% p.a.
1981	43,705	—
1991	36,364	−1.82%
2001	43,937	+1.91%
2011	55,286	+2.32%
2021	66,658	+1.89%
Source: Citypopulation

At the time of the 2021 Nepal census, Mugu District had a population of 64,549. 10.75% of the population is under 5 years of age. It has a literacy rate of 68.09% and a sex ratio of 993 females per 1000 males. 24,527 (38.00%) lived in municipalities.

Castes/ethnic groups in Mugu district (2021)
1. Chhetri (50.5%)
2. Thakuri (14.5%)
3. Kami (14.4%)
4. Damai (5.38%)
5. Bahun (4.62%)
6. Mugali (2.55%)
7. Sarki (2.46%)
8. Karmarong (2.23%)
9. Tamang (1.76%)
10. Others (1.55%)

Khas people make up a majority of the population with 92% of the population. Chhetris form an outright majority in the district with 50% of the population, while Khas Dalits make up 22% of the population. Hill Janjatis make up 7% of the population, mainly Tibetic groups like Mugum and Karmarong.

Languages of Mugu district (2021)
1. Nepali (86.3%)
2. Khash (6.68%)
3. Karmarong (3.80%)
4. Mugom (2.34%)
5. Others (0.91%)

At the time of the 2021 census, 86.27% of the population spoke Nepali 6.68% Khash, 3.80% Karmarong and 2.34% Mugali as their first language. In 2011, 92.4% of the population spoke Nepali as their first language.

Religion in Mugu District (2021)
Religion	Percent
Hinduism	91.77%
Buddhism	7.43%
Christianity	0.77%
Other or not stated	0.03%

== Administration ==
The district consists of four municipalities, out of which all are rural municipalities. These are as follows:

- Chhayanath Rara Municipality
- Mugum Karmarong Rural Municipality
- Soru Rural Municipality
- Khatyad Rural Municipality

=== Former village development committees ===
Prior to the restructuring of the district, Mugu District consisted of the following municipalities and village development committees:

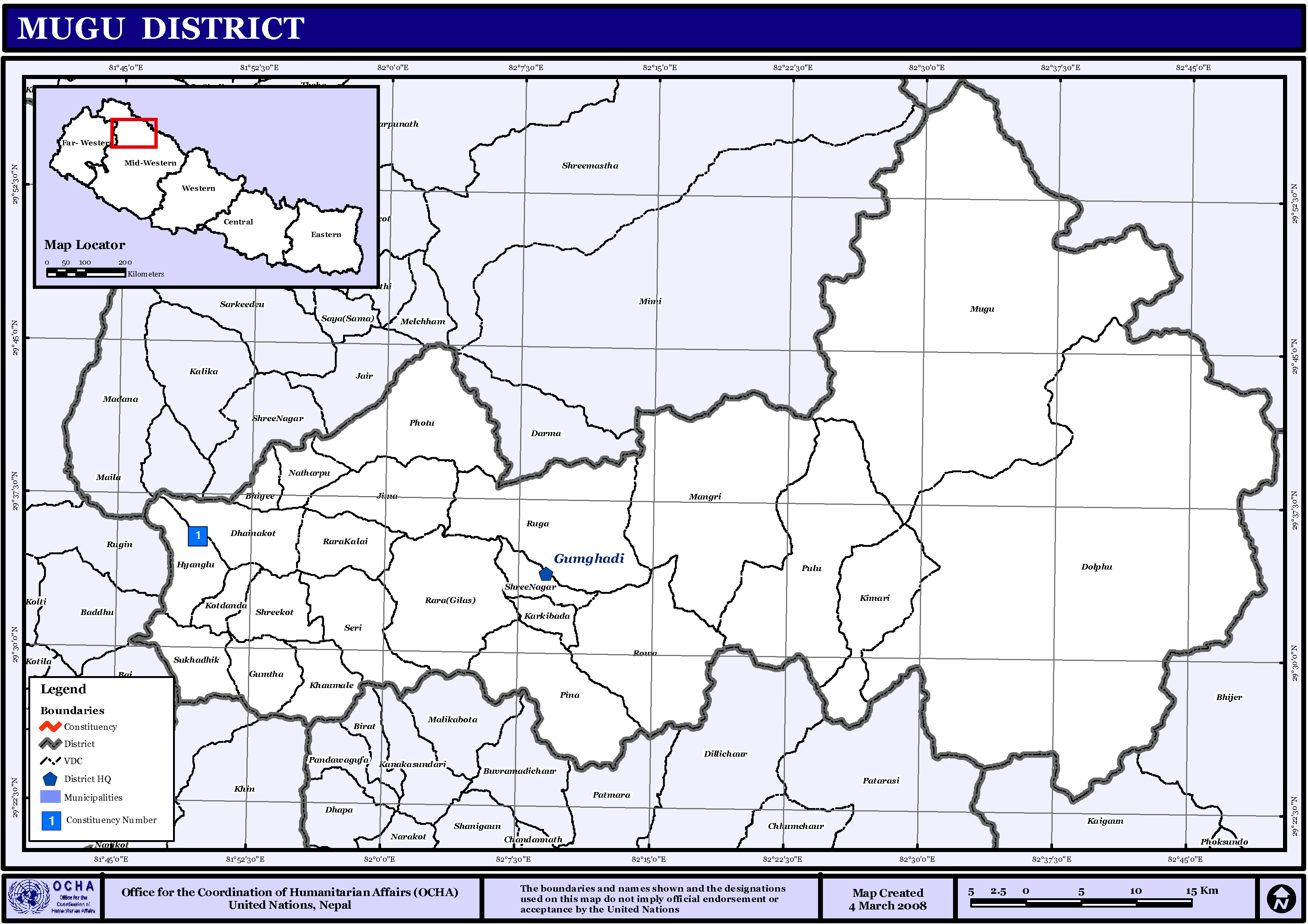
Map of the VDCs in Mugu District

- Bhiyi
- Dhainakot
- Dolphu
- Jima
- Gamtha
- Hyanglu
- Jima
- Kale
- Karkibada
- Kimri
- Kotdada
- Mangri
- Mugu
- Natharpu
- Photu
- Pina
- Pulu
- Rara
- Rara Kalai
- Rowa
- Ruga
- Khamale
- Seri
- Srikot
- Srinagar
- Sukhadhik
