= Karnali Zone =

Coordinates: 29°35′N 82°10′E

Karnali Zone/Khasan कर्णाली अञ्चल/खसान
- Zone
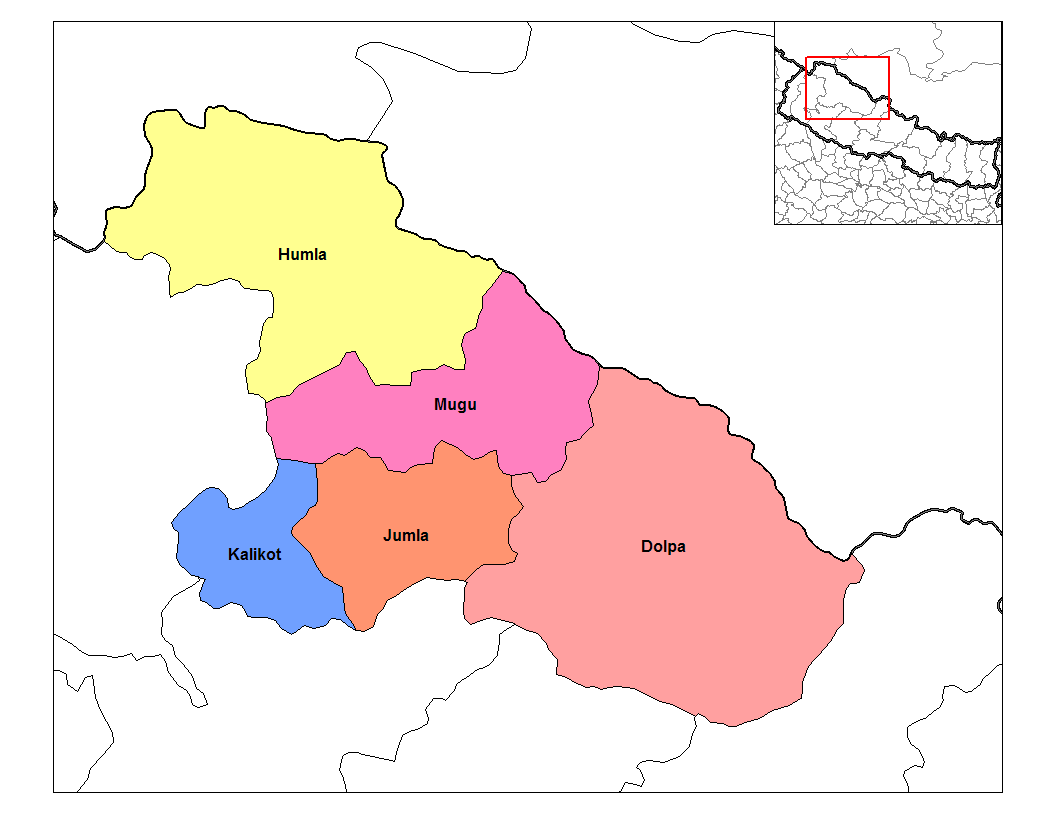
- Country: Nepal
- Region: Mid-Western
- Zone: Karnali
- Time zone: UTC+5:45 (Nepal Time)

Karnali Zone (Nepali: खसान अञ्चल) was one of the fourteen zones located in the Mid-Western Development Region of Nepal. The headquarters of Karnali Zone was Jumla.

Karnali Zone was one of the poorest and most remote regions of Nepal, not very accessible by road yet. There are airfields in all districts except Kalikot which is connected seasonally by roadways to Jumla Airport.

Karnali Zone was the largest zone of Nepal, with two national parks. Shey Phoksundo National Park Shey Phoksundo (with Phoksundo Lake—the deepest lake of Nepal), famous for the snow leopard, is Nepal's largest park with an area of 3,555 km^{2}. Rara National Park surrounds Rara Lake—at 10.2 km^{2}, Nepal's largest lake—known as the "Pearl of Nepal".

== Administrative subdivisions ==
Karnali was divided into five districts; since 2015 these districts have been redesignated as part of Karnali Province.

District	Type	Headquarters	Since 2015 part of Province
Dolpa	Mountain	Dunai	Karnali Province
Humla	Mountain	Simikot	Karnali Province
Jumla	Mountain	Jumla	Karnali Province
Kalikot	Mountain	Manma	Karnali Province
Mugu	Mountain	Gamgadhi	Karnali Province

== See also ==
- Development Regions of Nepal (Former)
- List of zones of Nepal (Former)
- List of districts of Nepal
