= Limi =

Limi लिमी
- Village (Ward council)
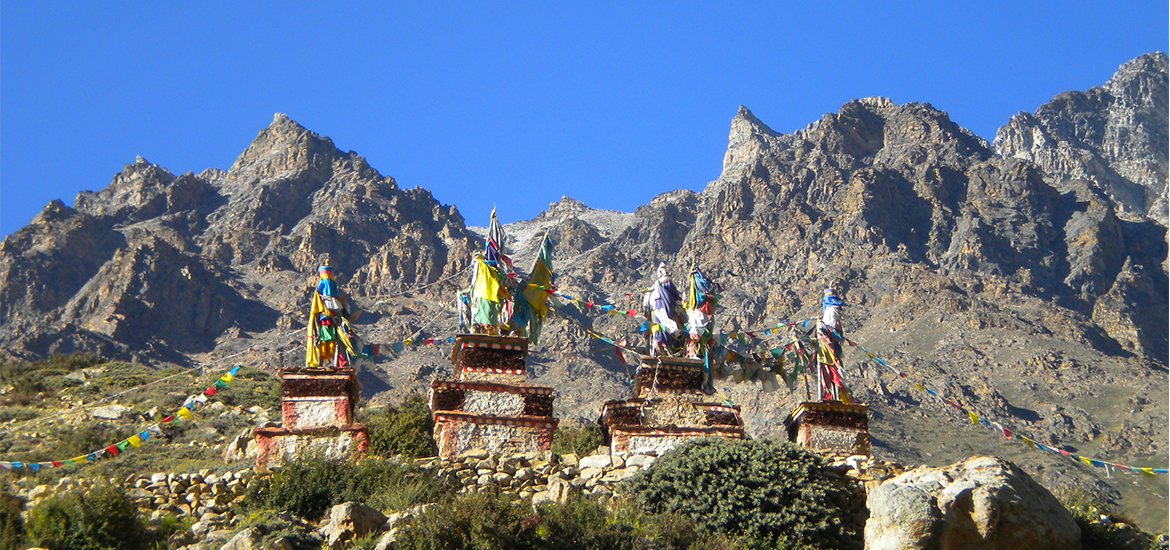
- Nickname: Hidden Valley
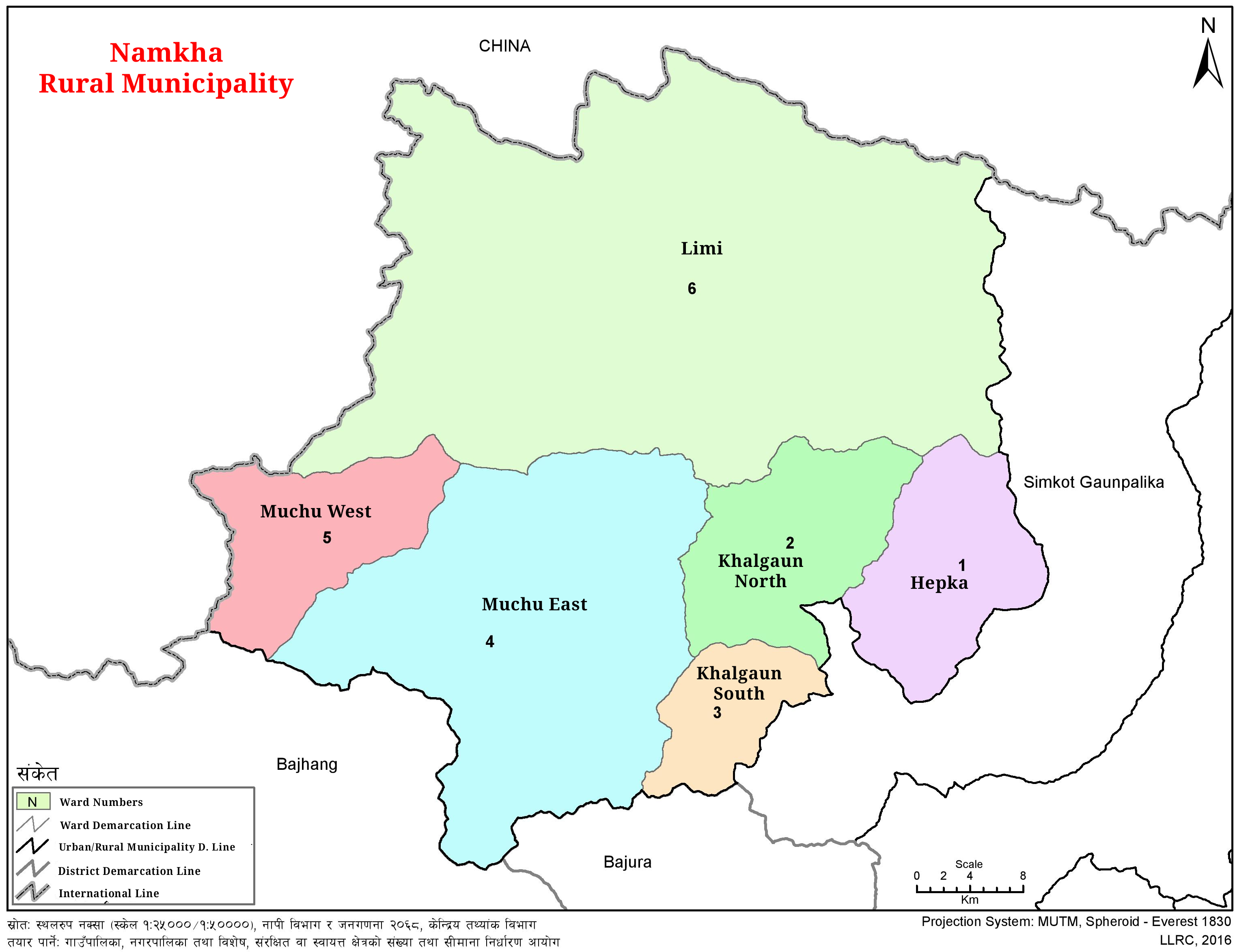
- Limi (Ward No. 6)

- Location in province Limi (Nepal)
- Coordinates: 30.29°N 81.65°E
- Country: Nepal
- Province: Karnali Province
- District: Humla District
- Rural Municipality: Namkha
- Ward: Ward No.6
- Established: 2017

Government
  - Type: Ward council

Area
  - Total: 1,201.29 km^{2} (463.82 sq mi)

Population (2011)
  - Total: 904
  - Density: 0.753/km^{2} (1.95/sq mi)
  - Religions: Tibetan Buddhism
- Time zone: UTC+5:45 (Nepal Time)
- Website: namkhamun.gov.np

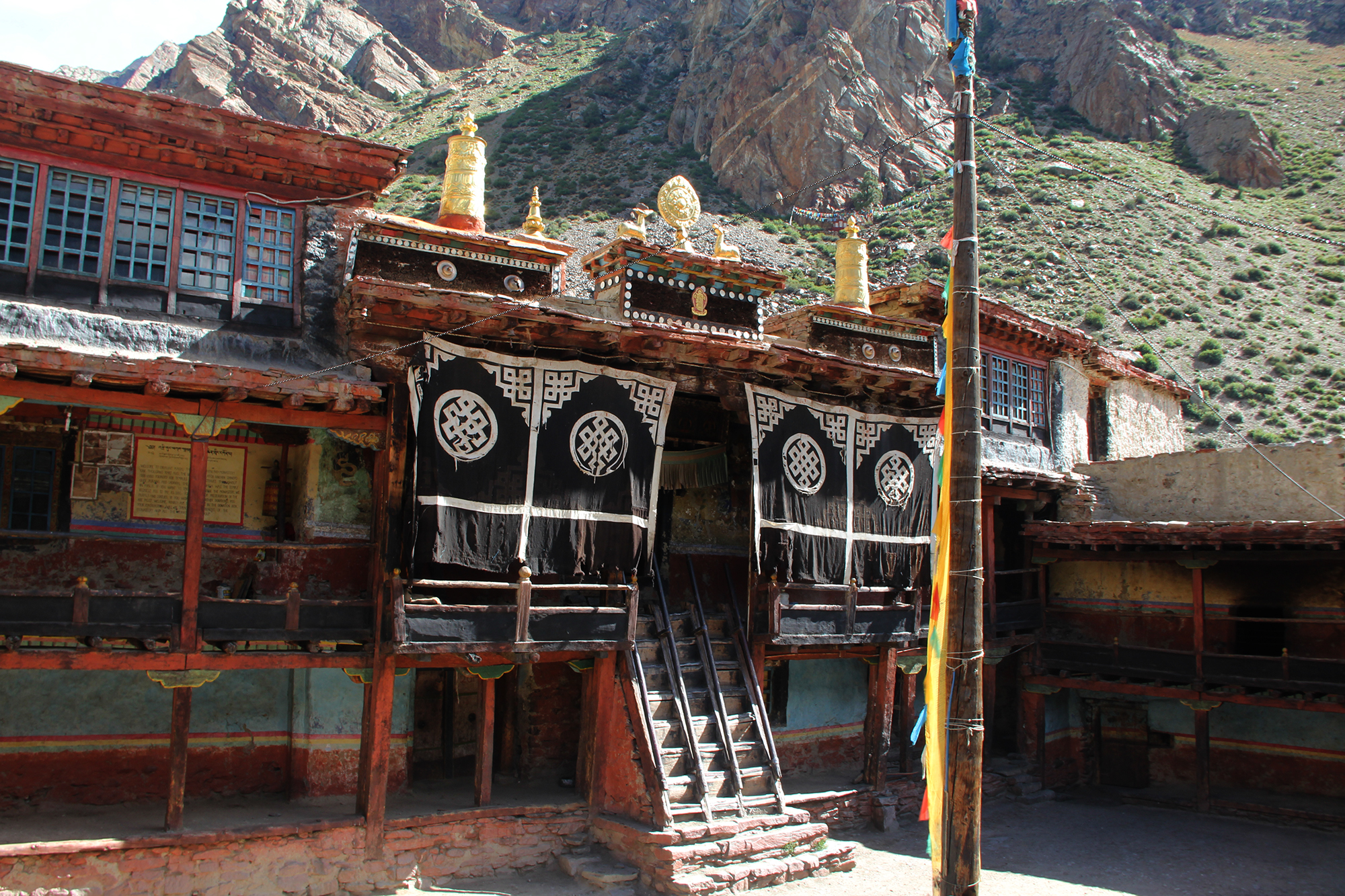
The 1000 years-old Halji monastery.

Limi Valley is a high-altitude valley that forms the northernmost part of the Humla District of north-western Nepal. To its north, the Limi valley borders the Purang County of Tibet, China.

== Administrative ==
Limi is a ward council of the Namkha rural municipality of the Humla district, which itself is a part of the Karnali Province. Previously the whole valley was known as the Limi Village Development Committee (VDC). As of the 1991 Nepal census, Limi valley had a population of 988 persons living in 169 individual households. The population of the valley decreased to 904 individual according to 2011 Nepal census.

== Geography ==
The Limi valley is drained by the Limi river, a tributary of the Humla Karnali river. This valley has only three settlements, the Dzang, Halji, and Til villages. Dzang lies at 3,920m, Halji at 3,700m, and Til at 4,100m above sea level. Halji village is located on the southern slopes of the Gurla Mandhata massif.

== Access ==
To go to the Limi valley, one first needs to travel to Simikot, the headquarters of district Humla. Presently, the way of traveling to Simikot, through bus by karnali highway or ,take a flight from Nepalgunj in the western Nepali plains. Limi valley can be accessed from Simikot by two routes. One follows the upstream course of the Humla Karnali river from Simikot to Hilsa; crosses the river at Hilsa, and climbs up the eastward trail to Limi valley. This route enters near Til village. Walking this route takes 5–7 days. The other route also begins by following the Humla Karnali river in an upstream direction, but diverges to turn north at the confluence of the Salli Khola and Humla Karnali rivers. This route goes over the 4,995m high Nyalu Lagna pass, enters Talung valley, and after another day's march, enters the Limi valley near Takche, east of village Dzang. Walking this route takes 4–5 days. A rough motorable road has been built from the Sino-Nepal border near Lapcha La pass till Salli Khola; it connects the eastern end of Limi, near Dzang, by road to Taklakot in Tibet (China).

A permit is required to visit the northern areas of Humla, including Simikot and Limi valley.

== Culture ==
The local inhabitants of the Limi valley, called the Limey, follow the Drikung Kagyu school of Tibetan Buddhism, and there is a small gonpa in each village. The Limey economy has traditionally been dependent on agriculture, supplemented by pastoralism and trade. Over history and in the present times, the Limi valley community has had various kinds of close ties with the neighboring region of Tibet.

The Rinchenling gonpa (monastery) at Halji is believed to have been built by Lotsawa Rinchen Zangpo, the 11th century AD Buddhist scholar and translator. There are narrative and forensic evidences that place the dating of the earliest parts of the monastery in the 11th century AD. The gonpa bears significant historical, artistic, and geographical resemblances with the Tabo monastery in Spiti valley, India - also believed to have been built by Rinchen Zangpo.

Limi valley is also known for the Lapcha La pass, on the border with Tibet, from where one gets an expansive view of Lake Manasarovar and the distant Mount Kailash on a clear day.

== Wildlife ==
The snow leopard, Himalayan wolf, Tibetan fox, Tibetan gazelle, kiang, argali, Himalayan brown bear, and Himalayan blue sheep have been reported from Limi. Wild yak, once thought to be extinct in Nepal since five decades, was reported from the Limi valley in 2014. Limi valley and its neighboring parts of upper Humla are rich in bird diversity.

== Climate Change ==
Since 2004, a series of GLOFs have come threateningly close to Halji Richenling monastery and have destroyed parts of the Halji village. Scientists have linked these GLOFs directly to global warming and climate change.

== In popular culture ==
On account of its geographic remoteness and the intactness of its culturally Tibetan heritage, the Limi valley has been called 'Shangri La' by some commentators. In a similar vein, the Zen Buddhist teacher Joan Hallifax has called Limi valley a 'beyul'. The Indian guru Sadhguru visited Limi valley to view Kailash-Manasarovar from the Lapcha La pass in September 2021.

== See also ==
- Humla district
- Hepka
- Khagalgaun
- Muchu
