= Riva (surname) =

Riva is an Italian surname.

== Geographical distribution ==
As of 2014, 57.8% of all known bearers of the surname Riva were residents of Italy (frequency 1:1,405), 7.1% of India (1:143,430), 5.3% of Brazil (1:51,231), 5.3% of Argentina (1:10,805), 4.5% of the Philippines (1:29,793), 4.1% of Bangladesh (1:52,025), 2.7% of the United States (1:174,602), 2.6% of Peru (1:16,250), 1.9% of France (1:47,539) and 1.5% of Switzerland (1:7,358).

In Italy, the frequency of the surname was higher than national average (1:1,405) only in one region: Lombardy (1:281)

== People ==
- Aldo Riva (1923–?), Italian football player
- Antonello Riva (born 1962), Italian basketball player
- Antonio Riva (pilot) (1896–1951), Italian World War I flying ace
- Carlo Riva (1922–2017), Italian motorboat designer and builder
- Celso Riva (born c. 1974), Italian video game designer
- César Humberto Chávez Riva Gálvez (born 1964), Peruvian footballer
- Diana-Maria Riva (born 1969), American actress
- Douglas Riva, American classical pianist
- Eddy Riva (born 1973), French race walker
- Emmanuelle Riva (1927–2017), French actress
- Ferdinando Riva (1930–2014), Swiss footballer
- Fernanda Riva (1920–1956), Catholic nun
- Fil Bo Riva (born 1992 or 1993), Italian musician
- Gigi Riva (1944–2024), Italian striker
- Giulia Riva (born 1992), Italian sprinter
- Giuseppe Riva (1834–1916), Italian lawyer and painter
- Isabella Riva (1887–1985), Italian actress
- Lorenzo Riva (1938–2023), Italian fashion designer
- J. Michael Riva (1948–2012), American production designer
- Janaína Riva (born 1989), Brazilian politician
- Maggie de la Riva (born 1942), Filipino film actress and rape victim
- Manuel Riva, Romanian DJ and record producer
- Maria Riva (1924–2025), German-born American actress
- Marianne dela Riva (born 1956), Filipino actress
- Mario Riva (1912–1960), Italian film actor
- Markus Riva, Latvian singer and producer, pseudonym of Miķelis Ļaksa
- Oreste Riva (1860–1936), Italian composer
- Osvaldo Riva (1927–2004), Italian wrestler
- Pedro Ipuche Riva (1924–1996), Uruguayan composer
- Pia Riva (born 1935), Italian skier
- Raphael Riva (died 1611), Italian Catholic bishop
- Roberto Riva (born 1986), Italian roller skater
- Ruggero Riva (born 1990), Italian football player
- Sergio Riva (born 1983), Italian bobsledder
- Sílvia Riva González (born 1979), Andorran politician and notary

== See also ==
- Antonio Riva Palacio (1926–2014), Mexican lawyer and politician
- Mariano Riva Palacio (1803–1880), Mexican politician and lawyer
- Vicente Riva Palacio (1832–1896), Mexican liberal politician, novelist, and military leader
- Bonvesin della Riva (1240–1313), a well-to-do Milanese lay member of the Ordine degli Umiliati
- Peter Dalla Riva (born 1946), Canadian former football player
- Richard Dalla-Riva (born 1963), Australian politician
- Renato De Riva (1937–1983), Italian speed skater
- Scipione Riva-Rocci (1863–1937), Italian internist, pathologist and pediatrician
- Riba (surname)
- Ripa (surname)
- Rio (disambiguation)
- Ríos (disambiguation)
