= Namkha Rural Municipality =

Rural municipality in Karnali Province, Nepal

Namkha नाम्खा
- Rural municipality
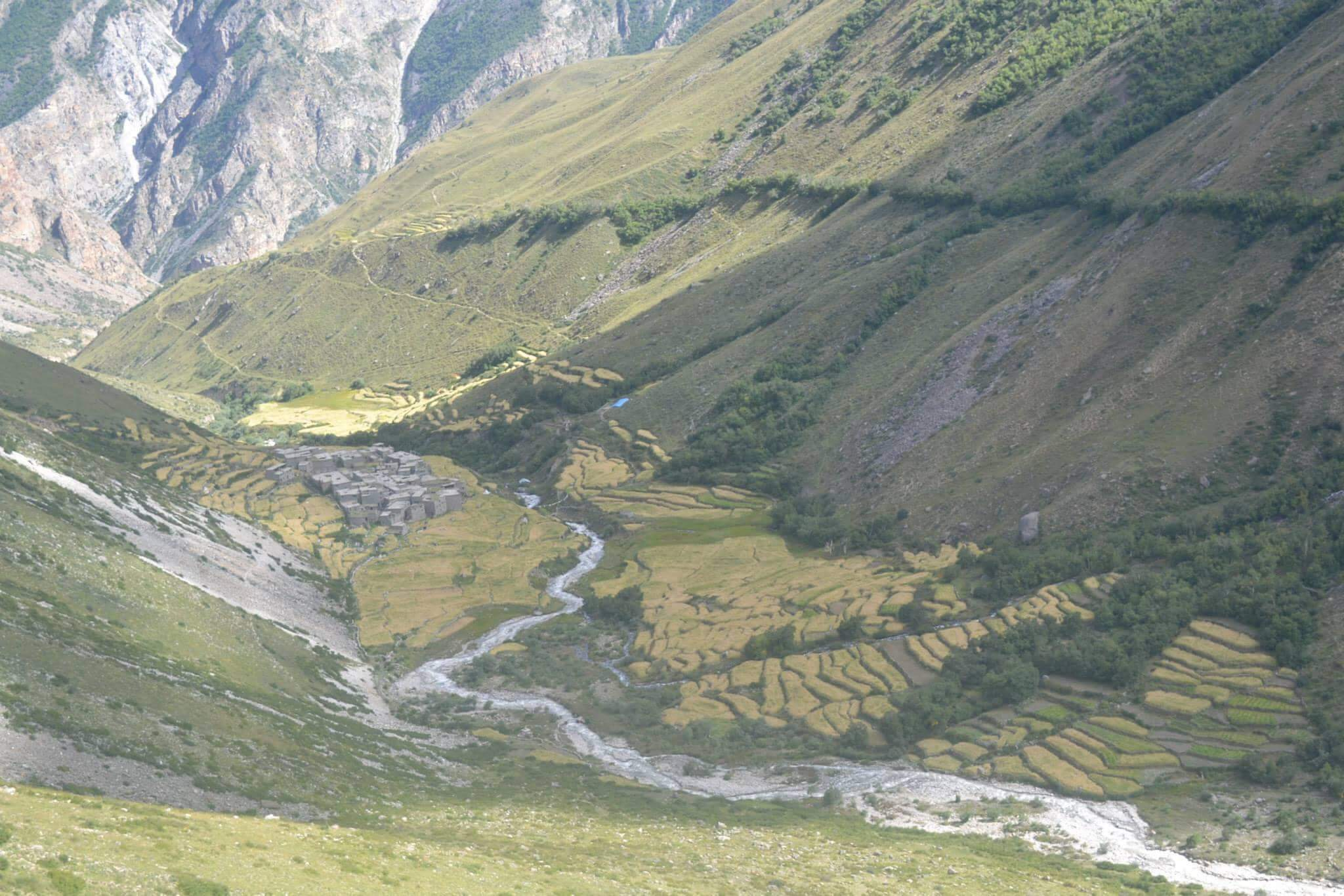
- Limi valley in Namkha RM

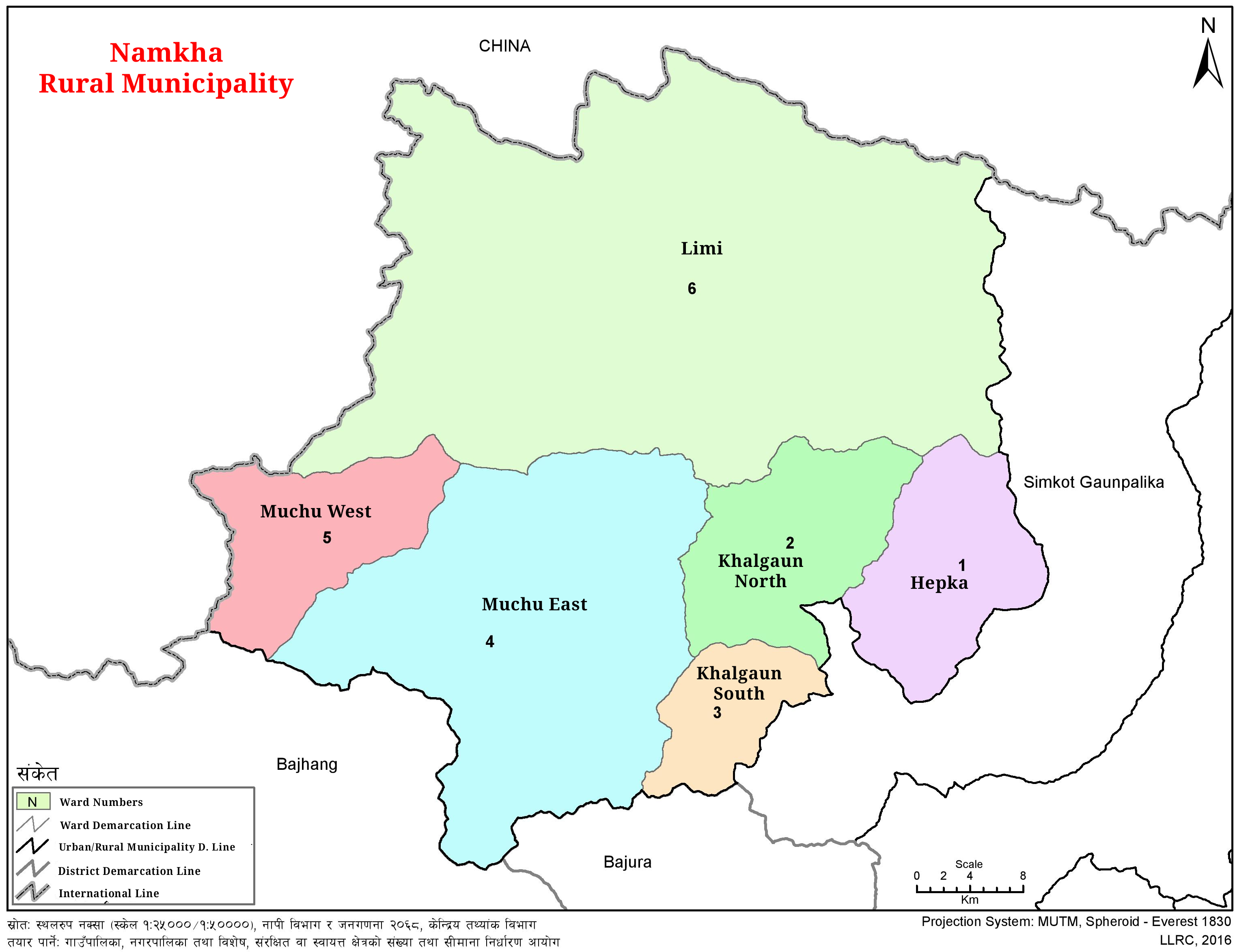
- Divisional map of Namkha RM

- Location in Nepal Namkha (Nepal)
- Coordinates: 30°3′36″N 81°27′36″E
- Country: Nepal
- Province: Karnali
- District: Humla
- No. of wards: 6
- Established: 10 March 2017

Government
  - Type: Rural council
  - Chairperson: Mr. Prem Bahadur Lama
  - Vice-chairperson: Mr. Takdir Lama

Area
  - Total: 2,419.64 km^{2} (934.23 sq mi)
  - Rank: 1st (largest RM of Nepal)

Population (2011)
  - Total: 3,900
  - Density: 1.6/km^{2} (4.2/sq mi)
- Time zone: UTC+5:45 (NST)
- Headquarters: Yalbang
- Website: namkhamun.gov.np

Namkha (Nepali: नाम्खा) is the largest rural municipality (by area) of Nepal located in Humla District of Karnali Province.

The total area of the rural municipality is 2,419.64 square kilometres (934.23 mi^{2}) and total population is 3900 individuals (as of 2011 Nepal census) only. The rural municipality is divided into 6 wards.

The rural municipality was established on 10 March 2017, when Government of Nepal restricted all old administrative structure (Village development committee) and announced 744 local level units (although the number increased to 753 later) as per the new constitution of Nepal 2015.

Hepka, Khagalgaun, Muchu and Limi Village development committees were incorporated to form this new rural municipality. The headquarters of the municipality is situated at Yalwang.

Namkha HQ:Yalbang
Ward No.	Village	Area (km2)	Population (2011)
1	Hepka	177.72	1057
2	Kermi	191.76	495
3	Khagalgaun	94.08	428
4	Yalwang	586.25	456
5	Muchu	168.54	460
6	Limi	1201.29	904
	Namkha	2419.64	3900

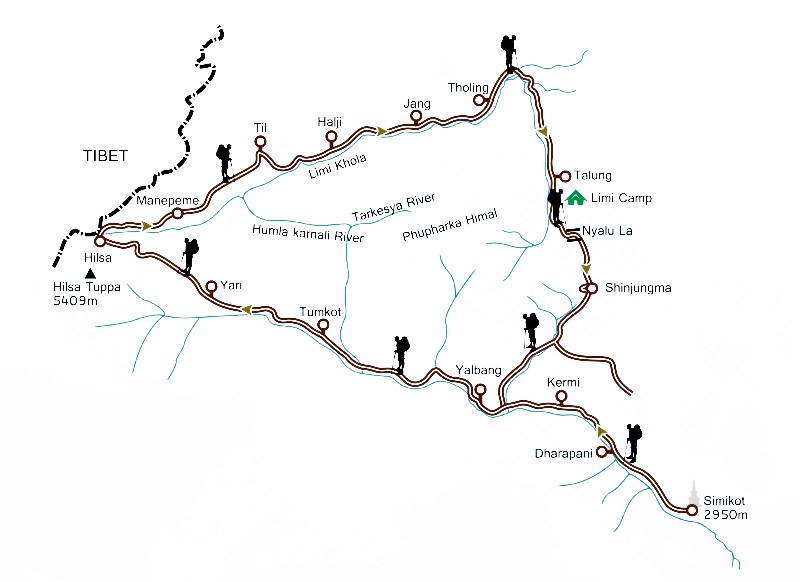
Trekking route from Simikot, Hilsa, Limi

Namkha RM is located in the most North-west part of Nepal in Humla District of Karnali Province. It is surrounded by Tibet (China) from North and West. Geographically Namkha is a difficult terrain which is also an isolated region which is still not connected by road with District headquarter Simikot. It is totally located on Himalayas. Some villages of Limi are located across the Himalayas. The region is known for Trekking. There is trekking route connecting Simikot to Limi, Muchu and Yalwang.

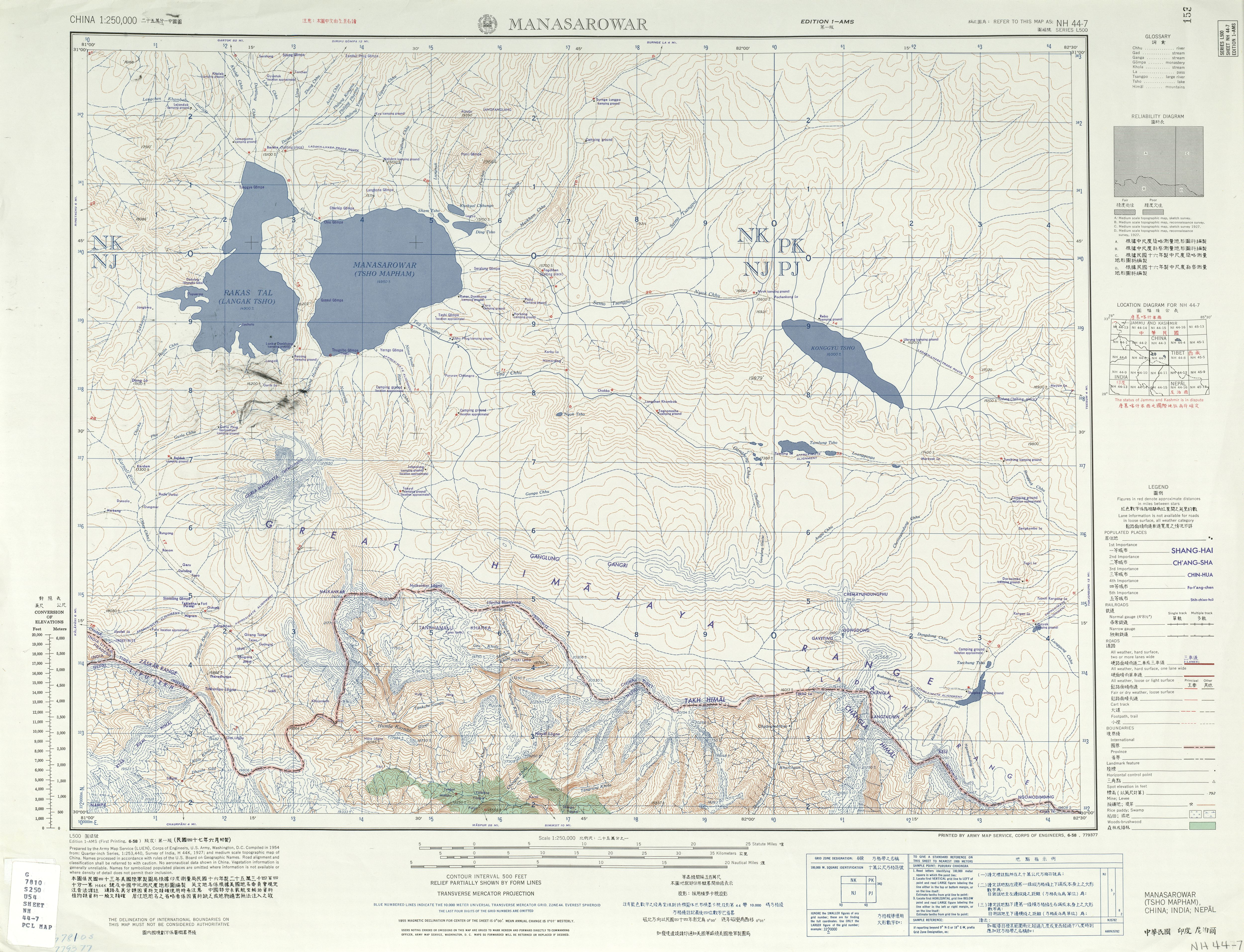
Namkha (Nepal) - Mansarovar (China) (1954)

== Demographics ==
At the time of the 2011 Nepal census, 98.3% of the population in Namkha Rural Municipality spoke Tamang and 0.9% Nepali as their first language; 0.8% spoke other languages.

In terms of ethnicity/caste, 58.7% were Tibetan, 20.5% Chhetri and 0.8% others.

In terms of religion, 67.8% were Buddhist, 20.0% Hindu and 0.2% others.
