= Chakka Bahadur Lama =

Nepalese politician

- छक्क बहादुर लामा

Member of Parliament, Pratinidhi Sabha
- In office 4 March 2018 – 17 September 2022
- Preceded by: Jeevan Bahadur Shahi
- Succeeded by: Tsering Damdul Lama
- Constituency: Humla 1
- In office May 1991 – August 1994
- Preceded by: Constituency established
- Succeeded by: Chakra Bahadur Shahi
- Constituency: Humla 1

Personal details
- Born: Tsewang Lama; 25 April 1959 (age 67) Bargaun, Humla District
- Party: CPN (UML)
- Other political affiliations: CPN (Maoist Centre); Samyukta Janamorcha
- Spouse: Rikjan Lama
- Parents: Takpa Tsyoden Lama (father); Nagderma Lama (mother)

Chakka Bahadur Lama (Nepali: छक्क बहादुर लामा) (born Tsewang Lama Nepali: छेवांग लामा) is a Nepalese politician belonging to CPN (UML). He had previously served as a member of parliament in the 2nd House of Representatives and the 1st Federal Parliament for Humla 1.

== Early life and education ==
Chakka Bahadur Lama was born in Bargaun in Humla District on 25 April 1959 to Takpa Tsyoden Lama and Nagderma Lama. His father, Takpa, was a Nyingmapa Lama and also the village physician. He has five brothers and three sisters. He completed his bachelor's degree in law and master's degree in sociology and anthropology from Tribhuvan University.

== Political career ==
In 1981 he became a central committee member of the All Nepal National Free Students Union (Sixth), the student union of CPN (Masal). He became the District in-charge for Humla District for CPN (Masal) in 1985. In the 1991 general elections, he was elected to the House of Representatives from Humla 1 for the electoral front of CPN (Unity Centre), Samyukta Janamorcha Nepal of which he was a central committee member. He won the elections by 8 votes. After the end of his term in 1994, he did not contest the mid-term elections and managed the Humla Conservation and Development Committee, a non-governmental organisation. In 2005 he was appointed as a state minister for Local Development in the cabinet appointed by King Gyanendra.

He rejoined the CPN (Maoist) at the start of the peace process in 2006 as a central committee member. He contested in the 2nd Constituent Assembly elections in 2013 for the Unified CPN (Maoist) but lost the elections. He stood in the 2017 general elections as an independent from Humla 1 and won the elections by 47 votes. He was a politburo member of the CPN (Maoist Centre) at the time and the party suspended him for contesting against the candidate of the left alliance. He served as a member of the State Management and Good Governance Committee of the 5th House of Representatives.

He joined CPN (UML) on 3 October 2022 and contested the 2022 provincial elections for Karnali from Humla 1 (B), but lost to incumbent chief minister Jeevan Bahadur Shahi by a margin of over 4,000 votes.

== Personal life ==
Lama is married to Rikjan Lama. His daughter was part of the People's Liberation Army during the Nepalese Civil War and was killed in Mugu District during the war. Lama is multilingual and knows five languages.

He was awarded the Provincial Talent Award for Karnali Province for contributions to literature in cultural research on the occasion of 206th Bhanu Jayanti, the birth anniversary of Bhanu Bhakta Acharya, a poet of Nepali language. Lama features prominently in Places in Knots (2022), Martin Saxer's anthropological study of remoteness and connectivity in the Nepal Himalayas.

== Electoral history ==
Year	Office	Electorate	Party	Main opponent	Votes for Lama		Result
Year	Office	Electorate	Party	Main opponent	Total	P.	Result
1991	Representative	Humla 1	Samyukta Janamorcha	Chakra Bahadur Shahi	4,695	1st	Won
2013	Constituent	Humla 1	UCPN (Maoist)	Jeevan Bahadur Shahi	4,759	3rd	Lost
2017	Representative	Humla 1	Independent	Mangal Bahadur Shahi	8,491	1st	Won
2022	Province MPA	Humla 1 (B)	CPN (UML)	Jeevan Bahadur Shahi	2,979	2nd	Lost

== Publications ==
- 2002 Kailash Mandala: A Pilgrim's Trekking Guide
