= Hepka =

Hepka हेप्का
- Village
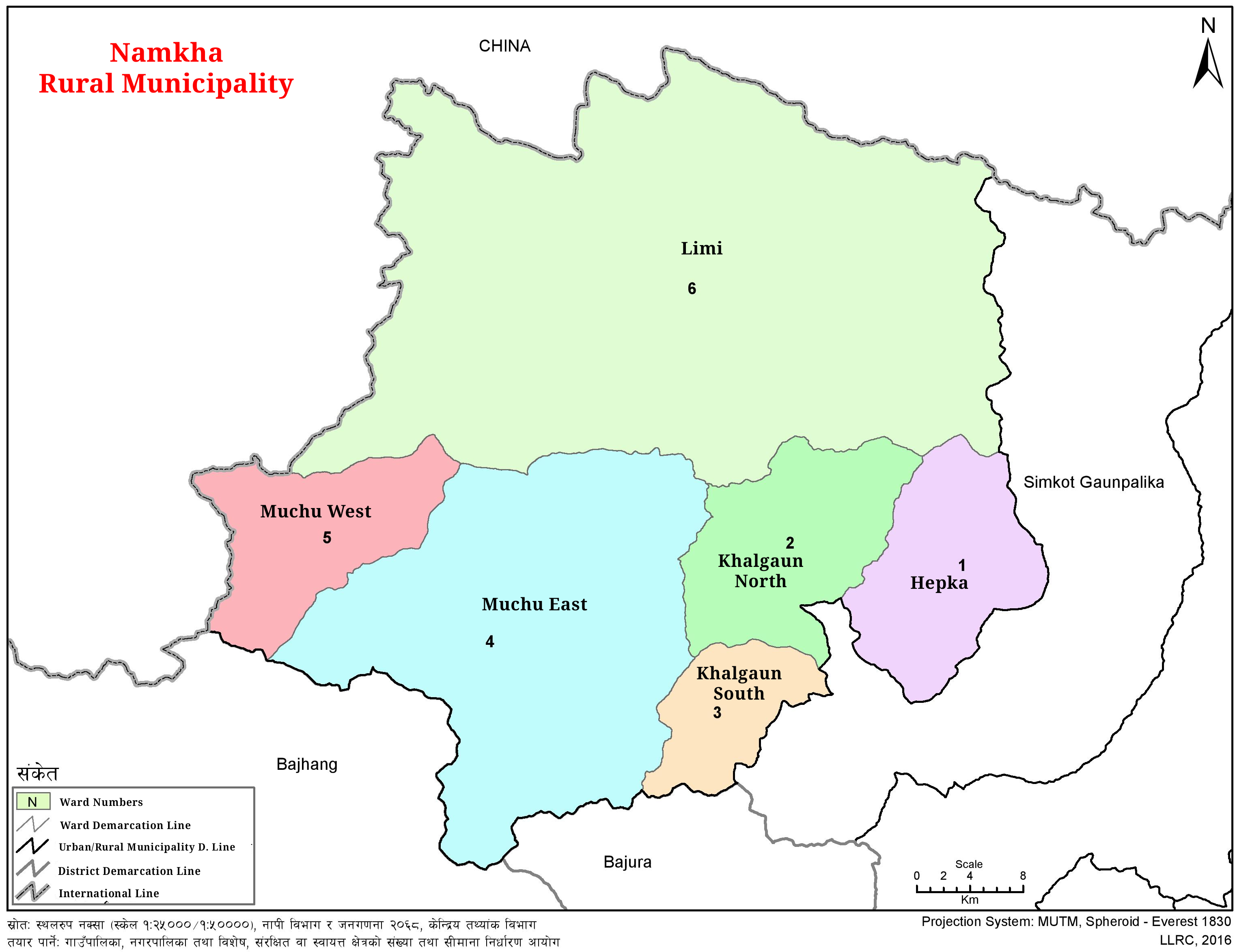
- Hepka Village (ward no. 1)

- Location in province Hepka (Nepal)
- Coordinates: 30.09°N 81.86°E
- Country: Nepal
- Province: Karnali Province
- District: Humla District
- Rural municipality: Namkha
- Ward No.: Ward No. 1
- Established: 2017

Government
  - Type: Ward Council

Area
  - Total: 177.72 km^{2} (68.62 sq mi)

Population (2011)
  - Total: 1,057
  - Density: 5.948/km^{2} (15.40/sq mi)
- Time zone: UTC+5:45 (Nepal Time)
- Website: namkhamun.gov.np/content/%E0%A4%B5%E0%A4%A1%E0%A4%BE-%E0%A4%A8%E0%A4%82-%E0%A5%A7

Hepka is a village and ward council of Namkha rural municipality in Humla District in the Karnali Province of north-western Nepal. At the time of the 1991 Nepal census it had a population of 977 persons living in 159 individual households.

== See also ==
- Limi
- Khagalgaun
- Muchu
