= Cavagnis =

Cavagnis is a surname. Notable people with the surname include:

- Felice Cavagnis (1841–1906), Italian canon lawyer and Cardinal
- Oscar Cavagnis (1974–2021), Italian cyclist

== See also ==
- Cavani
