= Humla 1 =

Parliamentary constituency in Nepal

- Parliamentary constituency for the House of Representatives
- Humla 1 in Karnali Province

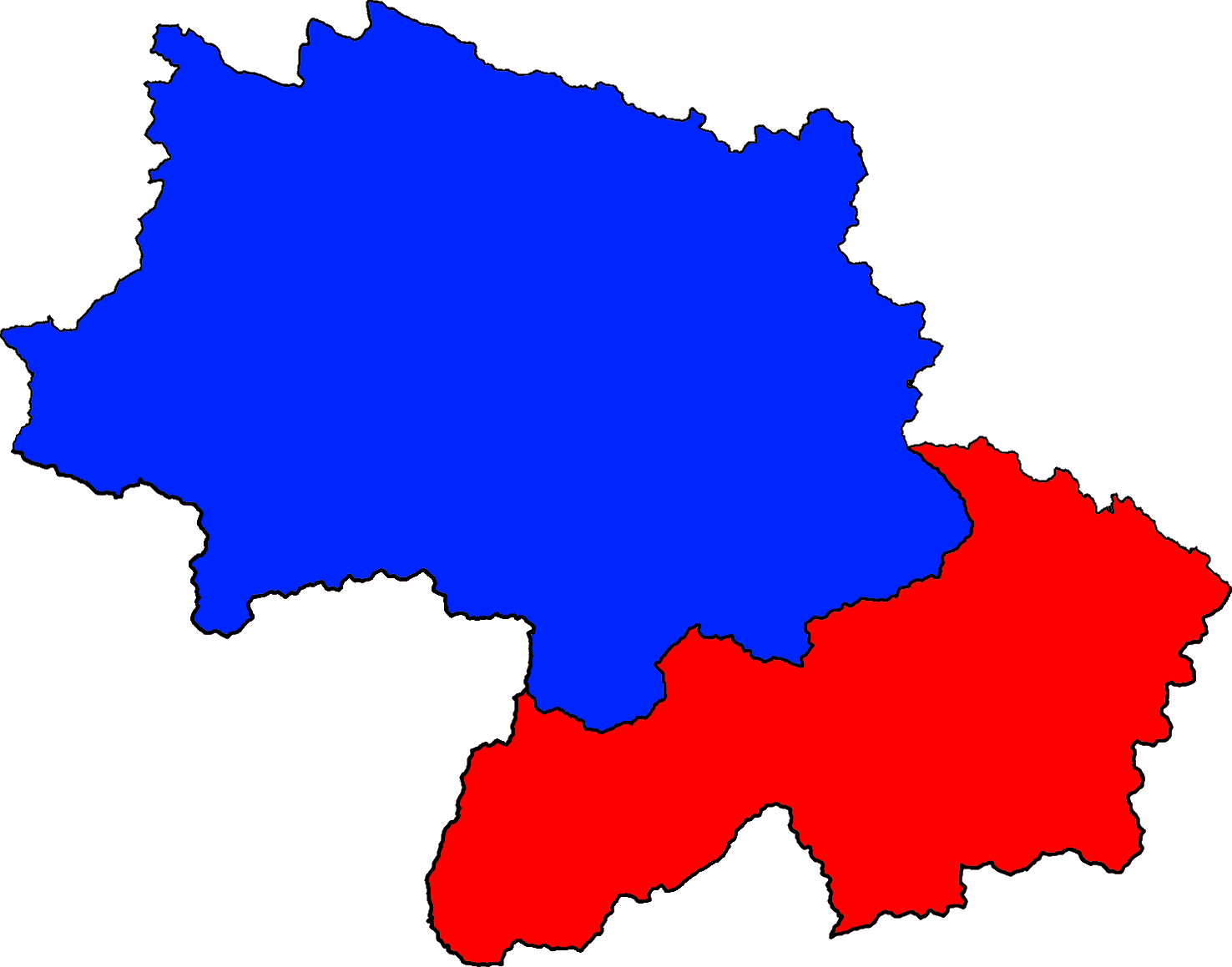
- Assembly segments Humla 1(A) (red) and Humla 1(B) (blue) within Humla District
- Province: Karnali Province
- District: Humla District
- Electorate: 27,435

Current constituency
- Created: 1991
- Number of members: 3
- Member of Parliament: Tsering Damdul Lama, Maoist Centre
- Karnali MPA 1(A): Rana Singh Pariyar, Maoist Centre
- Karnali MPA 1(B): Jeevan Bahadur Shahi, Congress

Humla 1 is the parliamentary constituency of Humla District in Nepal. This constituency came into existence on the Constituency Delimitation Commission (CDC) report submitted on 31 August 2017.

== Incorporated areas ==
Humla 1 incorporates the entirety of Humla District.

== Assembly segments ==
It encompasses the following Karnali Provincial Assembly segment

- Humla 1(A)
- Humla 1(B)

== Members of Parliament ==
=== Parliament/Constituent Assembly ===
Election	Member	Party
1991	Chakka Bahadur Lama	Samyukta Janamorcha
1994	Chakra Bahadur Shahi	Nepali Congress
1999	Gorakh Bahadur Bogati	CPN (UML)
2008	Karn Jit Budhathoki	CPN (Maoist)
January 2009	Karn Jit Budhathoki	UCPN (Maoist)
2013	Jeevan Bahadur Shahi	Nepali Congress
2017	Chakka Bahadur Lama	Independent
2022	Tsering Damdul Lama	CPN (Maoist Centre)

=== Provincial Assembly ===
==== 1(A) ====
Election	Member	Party
2017	Dal Rawal	CPN (UML)
May 2018	Dal Rawal	Nepal Communist Party
March 2021	Dal Rawal	CPN (UML)
2022	Rana Singh Pariyar	CPN (Maoist Centre)

==== 1(B) ====
Election	Member	Party
2017	Jeevan Bahadur Shahi	Nepali Congress

== Election results ==
=== Election in the 2020s ===
==== 2022 general election ====
Candidate	Party	Votes	%
Tsering Damdul Lama	CPN (Maoist Centre)	14,371	59.23
Dal Rawal	CPN (UML)	9,516	39.22
Others		378	1.56
Total		24,265	100.00
Majority		4,855	
CPN (Maoist Centre) gain			

==== 2022 provincial election ====
===== 1(A) =====
Candidate	Party	Votes	%
Rana Singh Pariyar	CPN (Maoist Centre)	6,481	45.93
Mangal Bahadur Shahi	Independent	4,630	32.81
Dal Phadora	CPN (UML)	2,098	14.87
Hasta Bahadur Shahi	CPN (Unified Socialist)	785	5.56
Others		117	0.83
Total		14,111	100.00
Majority		1,851	
CPN (Maoist Centre) gain			

===== 1(B) =====
Candidate	Party	Votes	%
Jeevan Bahadur Shahi	Nepali Congress	7,056	69.21
Chakka Bahadur Lama	CPN (UML)	2,979	29.22
Others		160	1.57
Total		10,195	100.00
Majority		4,077	
Nepali Congress hold			

=== Election in the 2010s ===
==== 2017 general election ====
Candidate	Party	Votes	%
Chakka Bahadur Lama	Independent	8,491	40.76
Mangal Bahadur Shahi	Nepali Congress	8,444	40.53
Tsimi Dorje Lama	CPN (Maoist Centre)	2,856	13.71
Others		1,042	5.00
Total		20,833	100.00
Valid votes		20,833	94.80
Invalid/blank votes		1,142	5.20
Total votes		21,975	100.00
Registered voters/turnout		27,435	80.10
Majority		47	
Independent gain			
Source: Election Commission

==== 2017 provincial election ====
===== 1(A) =====
Candidate	Party	Votes	%
Dal Rawal	CPN (UML)	7,158	58.98
Than Bahadur Rokaya	Nepali Congress	4,811	39.64
Dharma Raj Aidi	Naya Shakti Party	167	1.38
Total		12,136	100.00
Valid votes		12,136	96.82
Invalid/blank votes		399	3.18
Total votes		12,535	100.00
Registered voters/turnout		156,322	8.02
Majority		2,347	
CPN (UML) gain			
Source: Election Commission

===== 1(B) =====
Candidate	Party	Votes	%
Jeevan Bahadur Shahi	Nepali Congress	4,519	48.98
Bijay Bhandari	CPN (Maoist Centre)	3,995	43.30
Prem Bahadur Shahi	Naya Shakti Party	712	7.72
Total		9,226	100.00
Valid votes		9,226	97.78
Invalid/blank votes		209	2.22
Total votes		9,435	100.00
Registered voters/turnout		11,813	79.87
Majority		524	
Nepali Congress gain			
Source: Election Commission

==== 2013 Constituent Assembly election ====
Candidate	Party	Votes	%
Jeevan Bahadur Shahi	Nepali Congress	8,332	39.14
Dal Rawal	CPN (UML)	4,939	23.20
Chakka Bahadur Lama	UCPN (Maoist)	3,475	16.32
Others		4,541	21.33
Total		21,287	100.00
Valid votes		21,287	98.41
Invalid/blank votes		343	1.59
Total votes		21,630	100.00
Registered voters/turnout		22,116	97.80
Majority		3,393	
Nepali Congress gain			
Source: Election Commission

=== Election in the 2000s ===
==== 2008 Constituent Assembly election ====
Candidate	Party	Votes	%
Karn Jit Budhathoki	CPN (Maoist)	13,318	56.77
Jeevan Bahadur Shahi	Nepali Congress	5,196	22.15
Gorakh Bahadur Bogati	CPN (UML)	3,290	14.02
Others		1,655	7.05
Total		23,459	100.00
Valid votes		23,459	74.76
Invalid/blank votes		7,922	25.24
Total votes		31,381	100.00
Registered voters/turnout		30,089	104.29
Majority		528	
CPN (Maoist) gain			
Source: Election Commission

=== Election in the 1990s ===
==== 1999 general election ====
Candidate	Party	Votes	%
Gorakh Bahadur Bogati	CPN (UML)	11,879	52.78
Chakra Bahadur Shahi	Independent	7,662	34.04
Others		2,965	13.17
Total		22,506	100.00
Valid votes		22,506	98.12
Invalid/blank votes		432	1.88
Total votes		22,938	100.00
Registered voters/turnout		28,375	80.84
Majority		4,217	
Nepali Congress hold			
Source: Election Commission

==== 1994 general election ====
Candidate	Party	Votes	%
Chakra Bahadur Shahi	Nepali Congress	7,887	53.27
Ang Bahadur Lama	Independent	6,920	46.73
Total		14,807	100.00
Nepali Congress gain			
Source: Election Commission

==== 1991 general election ====
Candidate	Party	Votes	%
Chakka Bahadur Lama	Samyukta Janamorcha	4,695	50.04
Chakra Bahadur Shahi	Nepali Congress	4,687	49.96
Total		9,382	100.00
Samyukta Janamorcha gain			

== See also ==
- List of parliamentary constituencies of Nepal
