= Francesco Ripa =

Francesco Ripa may refer to:

- Francesco Ripa (footballer born 1974), goalkeeper
- Francesco Ripa (footballer born 1985), forward

== See also ==
- San Francesco a Ripa
- Ripa (surname)
