= Nyalu Lagna Pass =

- Location within Karnali Province Location within Nepal

Highest point
- Elevation: 4,995 m (16,388 ft)
- Coordinates: 30°09′52″N 81°42′49″E

Geography
- Location: Namkha, Humla, Karnali, Nepal

Climbing
- Easiest route: snow/ice/glacier climb

Nyalu Lagna Pass or just Nyalu Pass is a mountain pass on Himalayas at elevation of 4,995 metres (16,388 ft) above the sea level. The pass is located at Humla District of Karnali Province in Nepal. Limi-Lapcha Road crosses through this pass to connect the Limi valley with Simikot. Simikot is the district headquarter of Humla. This pass lies on an ancient trade route between Humla and Tibet, starting from Salli Khola in the Humla Karnali valley, going through Tsong Tsa valley, passing over the Nyalu Lagna pass, then going through the Talung valley, and entering the Limi valley near Takche. From Takche, one path heads west, to village Dzang, and the other path heads north, to the Lapcha La pass, further north beyond which lies the Purang County of the Tibetan Autonomous Region, China.
