= Chankheli Rural Municipality =

Chankheli चंखेली गाउँपालिका
- Rural Municipality
- Location in Nepal
- Coordinates: 29.93°N 82.31°E
- Country: Nepal
- Province: Karnali Province
- District: Humla
- Wards: 7
- Established: 10 March 2017

Government
  - Type: Rural Council
  - Chairperson: pyari all shahi (Nepali Congress)
  - Vice-chairperson: Bimala Shahi (NCP)

Area
  - Total: 1,310.41 km^{2} (505.95 sq mi)
  - Rank: 8th largest RM (in country); 3rd largest (in province)

Population (2011)
  - Total: 5,517
  - Density: 4.210/km^{2} (10.90/sq mi)
- Time zone: UTC+5:45 (NST)
- Headquarter: Srimastha
- Website: chankhelimun.gov.np

Chankheli (Nepali: चंखेली गाउँपालिका) is a rural municipality located in Humla District of Karnali Province of Nepal.

The rural municipality is divided into total 7 wards and the headquarters of the rural municipality is situated at Srimastha.

== Demographics ==
At the time of the 2011 Nepal census, 99.5% of the population in Chankheli Rural Municipality spoke Nepali and 0.2% Sign language as their first language; 0.3% spoke other languages.

In terms of ethnicity/caste, 32.2% were Chhetri, 18.0% Thakuri, 16.1% Hill Brahmin, 13.9% Byasi/Sauka, 8.7% Kami, 7.2% Tamang, 2.7% Damai/Dholi, 0.7% Sarki and 0.5% others.

In terms of religion, 80.4% were Hindu, 19.5% Buddhist and 0.1% others.

== See also ==
- Chankheli Peak
