= Simkot Rural Municipality =

Simkot सिमकोट गाउँपालिका
- Rural Municipality
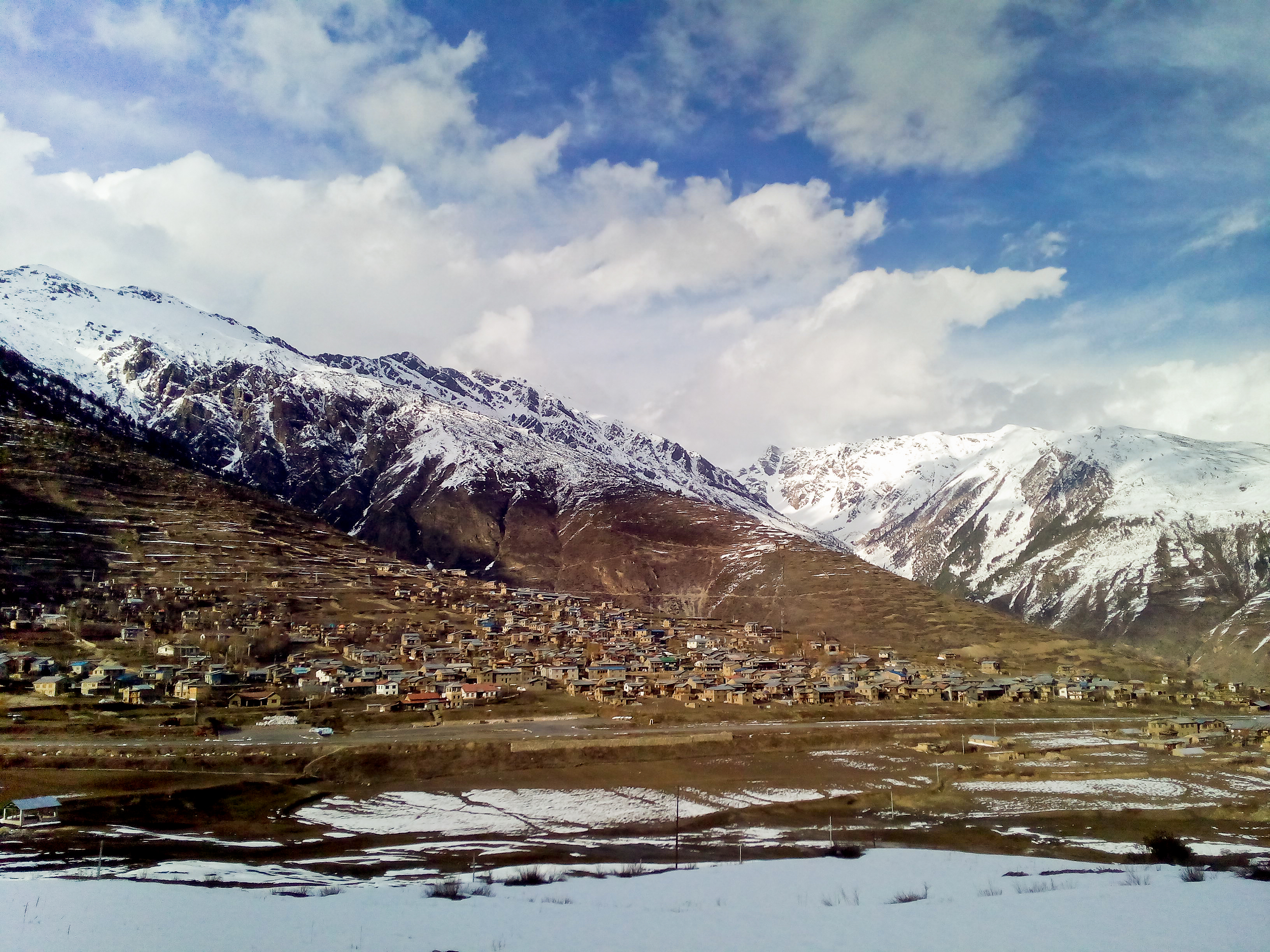
- Simkot village

- Location in Nepal
- Coordinates: 29°58′18″N 81°49′15″E
- Country: Nepal
- Province: Karnali Province
- District: Humla
- Wards: 8
- Established: 10 March 2017

Government
  - Type: Rural Council
  - Chairperson: Mr.Padam Bahadur Lama (NC)
  - Vice-chairperson: Mr.Wali Rawat -Independent

Area
  - Total: 785.89 km^{2} (303.43 sq mi)

Population (2011)
  - Total: 11,557
  - Density: 14.706/km^{2} (38.087/sq mi)
- Time zone: UTC+5:45 (NST)
- Headquarter: Simikot
- Website: simkotmun.gov.np

Simkot (Nepali: सिमकोट गाउँपालिका) is a rural municipality located in Humla District of Karnali Province of Nepal.

The rural municipality is divided into total 8 wards and the headquarters of the rural municipality is situated at Simikot.

Simikot airport is one and only airport of Humla, located on Simikot. Simkot serves as the gateway to Mansarobar/ Kailash pilgrimage.

== Demographics ==
At the time of the 2011 Nepal census, 80.0% of the population in Simkot Rural Municipality spoke Nepali, 18.7% Tamang, 0.3% Magar, 0.3% Sign language, 0.2% Maithili and 0.1% Doteli as their first language; 0.4% spoke other languages.

In terms of ethnicity/caste, 40.5% were Chhetri, 25.1% Thakuri, 19.1% Tibetan, 9.9% Kami, 1.9% Damai/Dholi, 1.1% Hill Brahmin, 0.8% Byasi/Sauka, 0.5% Magar and 1.1% others.

In terms of religion, 80.2% were Hindu, 19.4% Buddhist, 0.2% Christian, 0.1% Muslim and 0.1% others.
