= Rinchenling monastery =

Tibetan Buddhist monastery in Nepal

Rinchenling Gompa Monastery
- Location within Nepal

Religion
- Affiliation: Tibetan Buddhism

Location
- Location: Humla, Nepal
- Coordinates: 30.223635°N 81.513611°E

Rinchenling Gompa (monastery) is an ancient Tibetan Buddhist monastery in Nepal located in Limi Valley of Humla district near the Tibet border at an altitude of about 3500 m msl.

== History ==
The monastery was founded by Rinchen Zangpo during 10th or 11th century AD. Rinchen Zangpo was a principle translator of the Buddhist scriptures from Sanskrit into the Tibetan language. He actively constructed Buddhist temples and monasteries during his lifetime. Legends say that Rinchen Zangpo built a total of 108 temples.

== Current building ==
The monastery is a three-store building with an area of about 36 m x 32 m surrounded by a rectangular courtyard. The upper two stories have assembly halls, a library, and a store room. The monks’ quarters, kitchens, and store rooms for ordinary objects are on the ground floor. The assembly room in the northern side houses a large four-fold image of Vairocana surrounded on its three sides by bodhisattvas.

== Flood risk ==
The monastery has a flood risk from the nearby glacial lake. In 2011, it partially burst, which caused damage to many structures in Halji Village.
