= Godi =

Godi, GODI, Goði or Gothi may refer to:

- Gothi or goði, the Old Norse term for a priest and chieftain
- Gothi, Nepal, a village and municipality
- Pont-ar-Gothi, a village in Wales
- Villa Godi, in northern Italy
- Godi-media, a pejorative term used to describe the parts of Indian corporate media that are defined by their subservience to government authorities

== People ==
- Franco Godi (born 1940), Italian composer, conductor, arranger and record producer
- Themba Godi (born 1966), South African politician
- Snorri Goði (963–1031), chieftain in Western Iceland
- Godi Daniel Melanchthon (1934–1994), an Indian Pastor
