= Riba (surname) =

Riba is a surname. Notable people with this surname include:

- Carles Riba (1893–1959), Catalan poet, writer and translator
- Pau Riba (1948–2022), Catalan artist, grandson of Carles
- Marta Riba Carlos (born 1972), Spanish ski mountaineer
- Pere Riba (born 1988), Spanish tennis player
- Tomo Riba (1937–2000), Indian politician

== See also ==
- Ripa (surname)
- Riva (surname)
- Rio (disambiguation)
- Ríos (disambiguation)
