= Tanjakot Rural Municipality =

Rural Municipality in Karnali Province, Nepal

Tanjakot ताँजाकोट गाउँपालिका
- Rural Municipality
- Location in Nepal
- Coordinates: 29.64°N 81.74°E
- Country: Nepal
- Province: Karnali Province
- District: Humla
- Wards: 5
- Established: 10 March 2017

Government
  - Type: Rural Council
  - Chairperson: Bagdal Malla (NCP)
  - Vice-chairperson: Manju Buda (NCP)

Area
  - Total: 159.1 km^{2} (61.4 sq mi)

Population (2011)
  - Total: 5,964
  - Density: 37.49/km^{2} (97.09/sq mi)
- Time zone: UTC+5:45 (NST)
- Headquarter: Maila
- Website: tajakotmun.gov.np

Tanjakot (Nepali: ताँजाकोट गाउँपालिका) is a rural municipality located in Humla District of Karnali Province of Nepal.

The rural municipality is divided into total 5 wards and the headquarters of the rural municipality is situated at Maila.

== Demographics ==
At the time of the 2011 Nepal census, 99.7% of the population in Tanjakot Rural Municipality spoke Nepali and 0.2% Tamang as their first language; 0.1% spoke other languages.

In terms of ethnicity/caste, 36.1% were Chhetri, 18.8% Hill Brahmin, 14.3% Thakuri, 9.3% Damai/Dholi, 8.7% Kami, 5.6% Byasi/Sauka, 4.7% Sarki, 1.9% Teli and 0.6% others.

In terms of religion, 94.1% were Hindu, 5.8% Buddhist and 0.1% Christian.
