= Sarkegad Rural Municipality =

Rural Municipality in Karnali Province, Nepal

Sarkegad सर्केगाड गाउँपालिका
- Rural Municipality
- Location in Nepal
- Coordinates: 29.779°N 81.952°E
- Country: Nepal
- Province: Karnali Province
- District: Humla
- Wards: 8
- Established: 10 March 2017

Government
  - Type: Rural Council
  - Chairperson: Krishna Rokaya (NCP)
  - Vice-chairperson: Joshi Dhami (NCP)

Area
  - Total: 306.7 km^{2} (118.4 sq mi)
- Elevation: 1,660 m (5,450 ft)

Population (2011)
  - Total: 9,868
  - Density: 32.17/km^{2} (83.33/sq mi)
- Time zone: UTC+5:45 (NST)
- Headquarter: Saya
- Website: sarkegadmun.gov.np

Sarkegad (Nepali: सर्केगाड गाउँपालिका) is a rural municipality located in Humla District of Karnali Province of Nepal.

The rural municipality is divided into total 8 wards and the headquarters of the rural municipality is situated at Saya.

== Demographics ==
At the time of the 2011 Nepal census, Sarkegad Rural Municipality had a population of 9,868. Of these, 99.7% spoke Nepali, 0.1% Tamang and 0.2% other languages as their first language.

In terms of ethnicity/caste, 52.9% were Chhetri, 22.9% Thakuri, 7.8% Kami, 5.1% Hill Brahmin, 3.7% Byasi/Sauka, 3.4% Sarki, 2.8% Damai/Dholi, 1.2% Badi, 0.1% Tamang and 0.2% others.

In terms of religion, 96.0% were Hindu, 3.8% Buddhist and 0.2% Christian.

In terms of literacy, 44.4% could read and write, 1.9% could only read and 53.7% could neither read nor write.
