= Ripa =

Ripa or RIPA may refer to:

== Places ==
- Ripa (rione of Rome), a rione of the City of Rome, Italy
- Ripa, Nepal, a village and municipality

== People ==
- Ripa (surname), surname
- Albert de Rippe (c. 1500–1551), Italian lutenist and composer, also known as Alberto da Ripa

== Other uses ==
- Radioimmunoprecipitation assay buffer (RIPA buffer), a radioimmunoprecipitation assay buffer
- Regulation of Investigatory Powers Act 2000, a UK law governing interception of communications (information technology)
- Ristocetin-induced platelet aggregation, an assay for von Willebrand disease
- Royal Institute of Public Administration, a defunct UK-based organisation for the furtherance of better public administration
- HCM Rajasthan State Institute of Public Administration (HCM RIPA), a civil service training institute in Jaipur, Rajasthan, India

== See also ==
- Rio (disambiguation)
- Ríos (disambiguation)
