= Rodikot =

Rodikot रोडीकोट
- Municipality
- Location in Nepal
- Coordinates: 29.85°N 81.99°E
- Country: Nepal
- Province: Karnali Province
- District: Humla District

Population (1991)
  - Total: 1,722
- Time zone: UTC+5:45 (Nepal Time)

Rodikot is a village and municipality in Humla District in the Karnali Province of north-western Nepal. At the time of the 1991 Nepal census it had a population of 1722 persons living in 309 individual households.
