= Madana, Nepal =

Madana, Nepal मदना
- Municipality
- Location in Nepal
- Coordinates: 29.70°N 81.75°E
- Country: Nepal
- Zone: Karnali Zone
- District: Humla District

Population (1991)
  - Total: 1,283
- Time zone: UTC+5:45 (Nepal Time)

Madana is a village and municipality in Humla District in the Karnali Zone of north-western Nepal. At the time of the 1991 Nepal census it had a population of 1283 persons living in 137 individual households.
