= Tsering Damdul Lama =

Nepali politician

- छिरिङ डम्डुल लामा

Member of Parliament, Pratinidhi Sabha
- Incumbent
- Assumed office 24 December 2022
- Preceded by: Chakka Bahadur Lama
- Constituency: Humla 1

Personal details
- Born: 19 August 1967 (age 58) Humla District
- Party: CPN (Maoist Centre)

Tsering Damdul Lama is a Nepalese politician, belonging to the Communist Party of Nepal (Maoist Centre) currently serving as a member of the 2nd Federal Parliament of Nepal. In the 2022 Nepalese general election, he was elected from the Humla 1 (constituency).
