= Melchham =

Melchham मेलछाम
- Municipality
- Location in Nepal
- Coordinates: 29.78°N 82.03°E
- Country: Nepal
- Zone: Karnali Zone
- District: Humla District

Population (1991)
  - Total: 1,364
- Time zone: UTC+5:45 (Nepal Time)

Melchham is a village and municipality in Humla District in the Karnali Zone of north-western Nepal. At the time of the 1991 Nepal census it had a population of 1364 persons living in 265 individual households.
