= Yanchu =

Yanchu याञ्चु
- Municipality
- Country: Nepal
- Zone: Karnali Zone
- District: Humla District

Population (1991)
  - Total: 415
- Time zone: UTC+5:45 (Nepal Time)

Yanchu is a village and municipality in Humla District in the Karnali Zone of north-western Nepal. At 1991 Nepal census, it had a population of 415 persons living in 81 individual households.
