= Kharpunath Rural Municipality =

Kharpunath खार्पुनाथ गाउँपालिका
- Rural Municipality
- Location in Nepal
- Coordinates: 29.941°N 81.857°E
- Country: Nepal
- Province: Karnali Province
- District: Humla
- Wards: 5
- Established: 10 March 2017

Government
  - Type: Rural Council
  - Chairperson: Mr.Karna Rawal (NC)
  - Vice-chairperson: Mrs.Sindhu Hamal (Shahi) (NC)

Area
  - Total: 880 km^{2} (340 sq mi)
  - Rank: 13th largest RM (in country); 4th largest (in province)
- Elevation: 2,260 m (7,410 ft)

Population (2011)
  - Total: 6,011
  - Density: 6.8/km^{2} (18/sq mi)
- Time zone: UTC+5:45 (NST)
- Headquarter: Kharpunath
- Website: kharpunathmun.gov.np

Kharpunath (Nepali: खार्पुनाथ गाउँपालिका) is a rural municipality located in Humla District of Karnali Province of Nepal.

The rural municipality is divided into total 5 wards and the headquarters of the rural municipality is situated at Kharpunath.

== Demographics ==
At the time of the 2011 Nepal census, 99.3% of the population in Kharpunath Rural Municipality spoke Nepali, 0.5% Sign language and 0.2% Tamang as their first language.

In terms of ethnicity/caste, 52.5% were Chhetri, 30.9% Thakuri, 15.1% Byasi/Sauka, 11.3% Kami, 3.5% Hill Brahmin, 3.2% Sarki, 2.8% Damai/Dholi, 0.2% Tamang, 0.2% other Terai and 0.3% others.

In terms of religion, 84.8% were Hindu and 15.2% Buddhist.
