= Kalika, Humla =

Kalika, Humla कालिका
- Municipality
- Location in Nepal
- Coordinates: 29.73°N 81.83°E
- Country: Nepal
- Zone: Karnali Zone
- District: Humla District

Population (1991)
  - Total: 2,430
- Time zone: UTC+5:45 (Nepal Time)

Kalika is a village and municipality in Humla District in the Karnali Zone of north-western Nepal. At the time of the 1991 Nepal census it had a population of 2430.
