= Felice Cavagnis =

Italian canon lawyer and Cardinal

- Cardinal-Deacon of Santa Maria ad Martyres
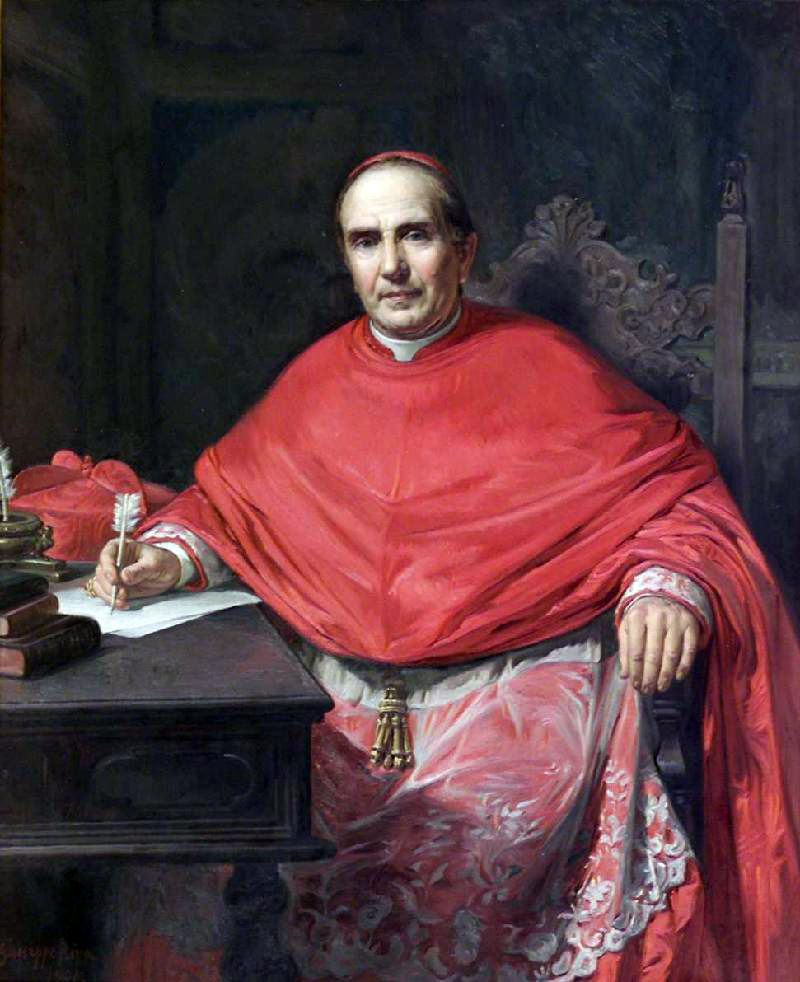
- Portrait - Giuseppe Riva (1901).
- Church: Roman Catholic Church
- Appointed: 18 April 1901
- Term ended: 29 December 1906
- Predecessor: Luigi Pallotti
- Successor: None - diaconate suppressed
- Previous posts: Pro-Secretary of the Congregation for Extraordinary Ecclesiastical Affairs (1893-96); Secretary of the Congregation for Extraordinary Ecclesiastical Affairs (1896-1901)

Orders
- Ordination: 19 September 1863 by Pietro Luigi Speranza
- Created cardinal: 15 April 1901 by Pope Leo XIII
- Rank: Cardinal-Deacon

Personal details
- Born: Felice Cavagnis; 13 January 1841 Bordogna, Bergamo, Kingdom of Lombardy–Venetia
- Died: 29 December 1906 (aged 65) Palazzo Lante, Rome, Kingdom of Italy
- Parents: Giovanni Cavagnis; Melania Piacezzi
- Education: Pontifical Roman Major Seminary; Pontifical Roman Athenaeum Saint Apollinare

Styles of Felice Cavagnis
- Reference style: His Eminence
- Spoken style: Your Eminence
- Religious style: Monsignor
- Informal style: Cardinal
- See: Roman Curia

Felice Cavagnis (13 January 1841 – 29 December 1906) was an Italian canon lawyer and Cardinal.

== Life ==
Cavagnis was born in Bordogna, which today falls within the Commune of Roncobello, in the Diocese of Bergamo.

After a course in the Pontifical Roman Seminary, he received a doctorate in philosophy, theology, and in civil and canon law. Pope Leo XIII named him professor of public ecclesiastical law in the Roman Seminary in 1880, a position which he retained for fifteen years, during which time he proved himself an eminent canonist, especially in all that related to the constitution of the Church and its relations with civil society.

The Roman congregations vied with one another in securing his services. He was appointed Consultor of the Sacred Congregations of Bishops and Regulars, of the Council, and of Studies; Consultor and Secretary of the Congregation of Extraordinary Ecclesiastical Affairs; Canonist of the Sacred Penitentiary; and member of the Commission for the Codification of Canon Law. In all these offices he left traces of his acuteness and skill in handling arduous and delicate questions. Austria, Spain, and Portugal honoured him with titles and distinctions, while the sovereign pontiff made him successively canon of several Roman basilicas, rector of the Roman Seminary, Domestic Prelate, and finally, on 18 April 1901, raised him to the cardinalate as Cardinal-Deacon of Santa Maria ad Martyres. Cavagnis died in Rome at the age of 65.

== Works ==
Cavagnis's major works include:

- Institutiones Juris Publici Ecclesiastici (Elements of Public Ecclesiastical Law), a manual of ecclesiastical government
- Della natura di società giuridica e pubblica competente alla Chiesa (Rome, 1880)
- Nozioni di diritto pubblico naturale ed ecclesiastico (Rome, 1886)
- La Massoneria quel che e quel che ha fatto, quel che vuole (Rome, 1905)
- Institutiones Iuris Publici Ecclesiastici (Rome, 1906), in three volumes
