= Chhipra =

Municipality in Karnali Zone, Nepal

Chhipra छिप्रा
- Municipality
- Location in Nepal
- Coordinates: 29.93°N 81.84°E
- Country: Nepal
- Zone: Karnali Zone
- District: Humla District

Population (1991)
  - Total: 777
- Time zone: UTC+5:45 (Nepal Time)

Chhipra is a village and municipality in Humla District in the Karnali Zone of north-western Nepal. At the time of the 1991 Nepal census it had a population of 777 persons living in 146 individual households.
