= Raya, Nepal =

Raya, Nepal राया
- Kharpunath Rural Municipality
- Location in Nepal
- Coordinates: 29.86°N 81.84°E
- Country: Nepal
- Zone: Karnali Zone
- District: Humla District

Population (1991)
  - Total: 1,288
- Time zone: UTC+5:45 (Nepal Time)

its ward No. 03 karpunath Gaupalika

Raya is a village and municipality in Humla District in the Karnali Zone of north-western Nepal. At the time of the 1991 Nepal census it had a population of 1288 persons living in 232 individual households.
