= Thechaya =

Thechaya ठेचाया
- Municipality
- Interactive map of Thechaya
- Country: Nepal
- Zone: Karnali Zone
- District: Humla District

Population (1991)
  - Total: 1,664
- Time zone: UTC+5:45 (Nepal Time)

Thechaya is a village and municipality in Humla District in the Karnali Zone of north-western Nepal. At the time of the 1991 Nepal census it had a population of 1664 persons living in 314 individual households.
