= Hilsa, Nepal =

Hilsa हिल्सा
- Village, border crossing
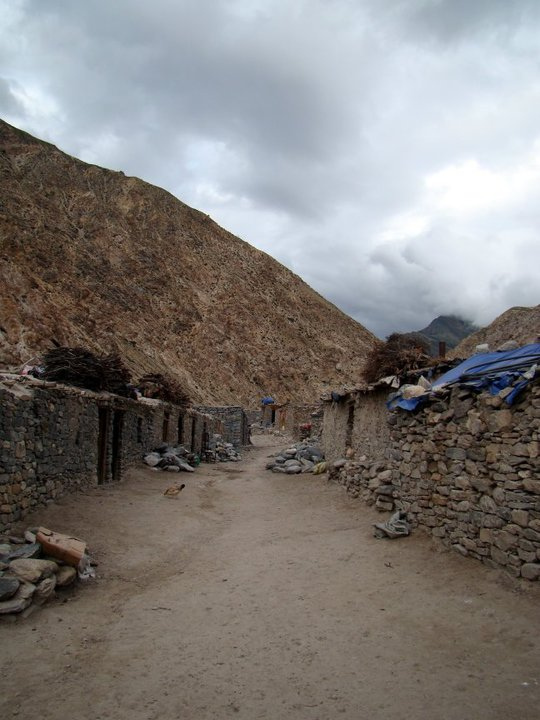

- Location in Karnali Province, Nepal Hilsa (Karnali Province) Hilsa (Ngari)
- Coordinates: 30°09′07″N 81°20′03″E
- Country: Nepal
- Development Region: Mid-Western
- Zone: Karnali
- District: Humla
- V.D.C.: Muchu
- Elevation: 3,640 m (11,940 ft)

Hilsa (Nepali: हिल्सा, romanized: hilsā) is a village in the northwestern corner of Nepal bordering Tibet Autonomous Region (China), where the Humla Karnali crosses from the Tibetan Plateau into the mountain regions on its descent to the Ganges. Hilsa is in Humla District, Karnali Zone facing Burang County, Ngari Prefecture, Tibet region of China.

== Geography ==
Hilsa is a border village of Nepal on the southern bank of the Karnali River, with a border-crossing to Tibet. Between the Kitta village and Hilsa, a 3.5-kilometre stretch of the Karnali river serves as the border between Nepal and China. At Hilsa itself, both the banks belong to Nepal. The route to Tibet involves transiting to the north bank of Karnali via a bridge, and then covering the length of the village on the north bank to reach the Tibetan border, where China runs a border checkpoint (Zherwa border crossing, Chinese: 斜尔瓦边境口岸).

On the other side of the border lies Tibet's Burang County, which contains the trading town of Purang—also called Taklakot, some 56 kilometres (35 mi) upstream—and the pilgrimage sites of Kailas–Manasarovar. Pilgrims headed to Kailas-Manasarovar normally fly to the Simikot Airport—51 kilometres (32 mi) to the south, take a helicopter ride to Hilsa, and then cross the border by road. In 2016, a motorable bridge and road were constructed up to the border, enabling road transport from Simikot to Tibet.

== Infrastructure and economy ==
From Hilsa, a rough road extends into Nepal as far as Simikot and no further. The Humla district has not yet been connected to the Nepalese road network. This has resulted in lack of access and underdevelopment in the region.

Traditionally, the people of the Humla district made a living through trade, carrying up grain to Tibet and briging back salt. The Chinese take-over of Tibet has led to the drying up of the trade, grazing restrictions led to decrease in livestock, and the region cannot grow enough food to feed itself. People have to come rely on subsidised food and loans.

Hilsa has been able to benefit from the pilgrimage traffic. Some 15,000 Indian pilgrims are said to travel to Kailas–Manasarovar via the Nepal route annually. Many residents of Hilsa built lodging facilities and earn a living through them during the tourist season. Ethnic Tibetans are largely barred from leaving for Nepal and India. Admission to Tibet is only granted to groups who acquire liaison officers at the border. Visitors are mainly tourists and pilgrims.

From Simikot, transport onward to the rest of Nepal is on foot or by air, meaning that goods arriving from the south are expensive. Goods trucked in through the Tibet are cheaper, despite the long distances from China's coastal factories. The Government of Nepal operates a customs checkpoint in Hilsa, mainly to levy duties.

Developments on the Chinese side of the border have also affected life in Hilsa. They find that the water in the Karnali River is no longer safe to drink because it is polluted by sewage upstream. China has also built a hydropower dam a few kilometres upstream, that has brought electricity to the Tibetans but increased fear of floods to the villagers of Hilsa. Meanwhile, Hilsa itself lacks electricity and mobile telecommunications.

== Bibliography ==
- Thubron, Colin (2011). To a Mountain in Tibet. New York: Harper Collins. Archived from the original on 15 December 2013.
- Bubriski, Kevin and Abhimanyu Pandey (2018). Kailash Yatra: a Long Walk to Mt Kailash through Humla. New Delhi: Penguin Random House.
