= Mimi, Nepal =

Mimi, Nepal मिमी
- Village Development Committee
- Location in Nepal
- Coordinates: 29.79°N 82.25°E
- Country: Nepal
- Zone: Karnali Zone
- District: Humla District

Population (1991)
  - Total: 800
- Time zone: UTC+5:45 (Nepal Time)

Mimi is a village and municipality in Humla District in the Karnali Zone of north-western Nepal. At the time of the 1991 Nepal census it had a population of 800 persons living in 151 individual households.
