= Lauthi =

Lauthi लौठी
- Municipality
- Country: Nepal
- Zone: Karnali Zone
- District: Humla District

Population (1991)
  - Total: 1,503
- Time zone: UTC+5:45 (Nepal Time)

Lauthi is a village and municipality in Humla District in the Karnali Zone of north-western Nepal. At the time of the 1991 Nepal census it had a population of 1503 persons living in 451 individual households.
