= Dandaphaya =

Dandaphaya डाँडाफाया
- Location in Nepal
- Coordinates: 30.00°N 81.79°E
- Country: Nepal
- Zone: Karnali Zone
- District: Humla District

Population (1991)
  - Total: 1,255
- Time zone: UTC+5:45 (Nepal Time)

Dandaphaya is a Village Development Committee in Humla District in the Karnali Zone of north-western Nepal. At the time of the 1991 Nepal census it had a population of 1255 persons living in 232 individual households.
