= Kermi =

Kermi may refer to:

- Kermi, Nepal, a village in Nepal
- Kermi bog, also known as a "kermi", a type of raised bog
