= Lali, Humla =

Coordinates: 29°52′N 81°54′E

Lali, Nepal लाली
- Municipality
- Interactive map of Lali, Nepal
- Country: Nepal
- Zone: Karnali Zone
- District: Humla District

Population (1991)
  - Total: 1,051
- Time zone: UTC+5:45 (Nepal Time)

Lali is a village and municipality in Humla District in the Karnali Zone of north-western Nepal. At the time of the 1991 Nepal census it had a population of 1051 persons residing in 185 individual households.
