= Jaur =

Jair जैर
- Municipality
- Interactive map of Jair
- Country: Nepal
- Zone: Karnali Zone
- District: Humla District

Government

Population (1991)
  - Total: 1,336
- Time zone: UTC+5:45 (Nepal Time)

Jair is a ward no.1 of Sarkegad Gaupalika Humla District in the Karnali Zone of north-western part Nepal. At the time of the 1991 Nepal census it had a population of 1336 persons living in 270 individual households.
