= Dami, Nepal =

Darma दार्मा
- Municipality
- Nickname: दार्म
- Motto: चन्खेलि
- Interactive map of Darma
- Country: Nepal
- Zone: Karnali Zone
- District: Humla District

Population (1991)
  - Total: 1,299
- Time zone: UTC+5:45 (Nepal Time)

Darma is a village and municipality in Humla District in the Karnali Zone of north-western Nepal. At the time of the 1991 Nepal census it had a population of 1299 persons living in 250 individual households.
