= Ripa (surname) =

Ripa is a surname. Notable people with the surname include:

- Cesare Ripa (c. 1560–c. 1622), Italian author
- Henrik Ripa (1968–2020), Swedish politician
- Kelly Ripa (born 1970), American actress and talk show host
- Francesco Ripa (footballer, born 1974), Italian footballer
- Francesco Ripa (footballer, born 1985), Italian footballer
- Manuela Ripa, politician
- Olof Ripa (1909–1992), Swedish diplomat

== See also ==
- Ripa (disambiguation)
- Riva (surname)
- Rio (disambiguation)
- Ríos (disambiguation)
