= Janaína Riva =

Brazilian politician (born 1989)

Member of the Legislative Assembly of Mato Grosso
- Incumbent
- Assumed office 1 January 2015

Personal details
- Born: 27 January 1989 (age 37)
- Party: Brazilian Democratic Movement (since 2016)
- Parent: José Riva (father)

Janaína Greyce Riva Fagundes (born 27 January 1989) is a Brazilian politician serving as a member of the Legislative Assembly of Mato Grosso since 2015. She is the daughter of José Riva.
