= Srimastha =

Srimastha श्रीमष्ठा
- Location in Nepal
- Coordinates: 29.93°N 82.31°E
- Country: Nepal
- Zone: Karnali Zone
- District: Humla District
- Elevation: 5,041 m (16,539 ft)

Population (1991)
  - Total: 915
- Time zone: UTC+5:45 (Nepal Time)

Srimastha is a Village Development Committee in Humla District in the Karnali Zone of north-western Nepal. At the time of the 1991 Nepal census it had a population of 915.
