= Bargaun =

Bargaun बरगाउँ
- Municipality
- Location in Nepal
- Coordinates: 30.02°N 81.90°E
- Country: Nepal
- Zone: Karnali Zone
- District: Humla District

Population (1991)
  - Total: 1,021
- Time zone: UTC+5:45 (Nepal Time)

Bargaun is a village and municipality in Humla District in the Karnali Zone of north-western Nepal. At the time of the 1991 Nepal census it had a population of 1021 persons living in 137 individual households. Its ward number was 5 before the country Nepal was divided into Providence or state and now after Country dividing into State the current ward number of this village is 3.
