= Sílvia Riva González =

Andorran politician

Sílvia Riva

Minister of Culture and Sports
- In office 30 May 2019 – 15 May 2023
- Prime Minister: Xavier Espot Zamora
- Preceded by: Olga Gelabert Fàbrega
- Succeeded by: Mònica Bonell Tuset

Member of the General Council
- In office 28 April 2011 – 16 January 2015

Personal details
- Born: 18 March 1979 (age 47) Andorra la Vella, Andorra
- Party: Democrats for Andorra

Sílvia Riva González (born 18 March 1979) is an Andorran politician and notary. She served as the Minister of Cultura and Sports 2019 until 2023.

== Education ==
Riva González was born in 1979 in Andorra. She completed part of her studies in Barcelona, qualifying with a degree in law and political science from Pompeu Fabra University. She also has a master’s degree in Andorran law from the University of Andorra. On her return to Andorra in 2001, she co-founded the youth section of the Liberal Party of Andorra (PLA).

== Political career ==
Riva González ran for municipal elections in her hometown of Andorra la Vella, but failed to win a seat as councillor by fifty-two votes. She then worked, as a political advisor for ten years, taking a break to have children, and returning to politics in 2011. She was elected to the General Council in the constituency of Andorra la Vella in the 2011 legislative elections. At the Council, Riva González took the head of the Committee on the Interior.

Newly elected Prime Minister Xavier Espot on 22 May 2019 appointed her as Minister of Culture and Sports in the new government. Part of her work has been to develop a national museum for Andorra. Riva González produced a White Paper on Culture in 2021, followed by a strategic plan for culture in Andorra to 2030. After 2023, Riva González is the General Counselor for the territorial constituency of Andorra la Vella, and has returned to practising law, specialising in civil law, family and inheritance law, and business law. On 17 May 2023 she was succeeded as Minister of Culture, Youth and Sports by Mònica Bonell Tuset. Riva González speaks Catalan, Spanish and French.
