= Kermi, Nepal =

Kermi केर्मी
- Municipality
- Location in Nepal
- Coordinates: 30.0517°N 81.6991°E
- Country: Nepal
- Zone: Karnali Zone
- District: Humla District

Population (1991)
  - Total: 518
- Time zone: UTC+5:45 (Nepal Time)

Kermi is a village and municipality in Humla District in the Karnali Zone of north-western Nepal. At the time of the 1991 Nepal census, it had a population of 518 people living in 76 individual households.
