= Gothi, Nepal =

Kuti, Nepal Sarkegad Rural Municipality kuti Sarkegard - 5, Humla
- Municipality
- Sarkegrd -5 Humla

Nepali, Tamang, Shahi transcription(s)
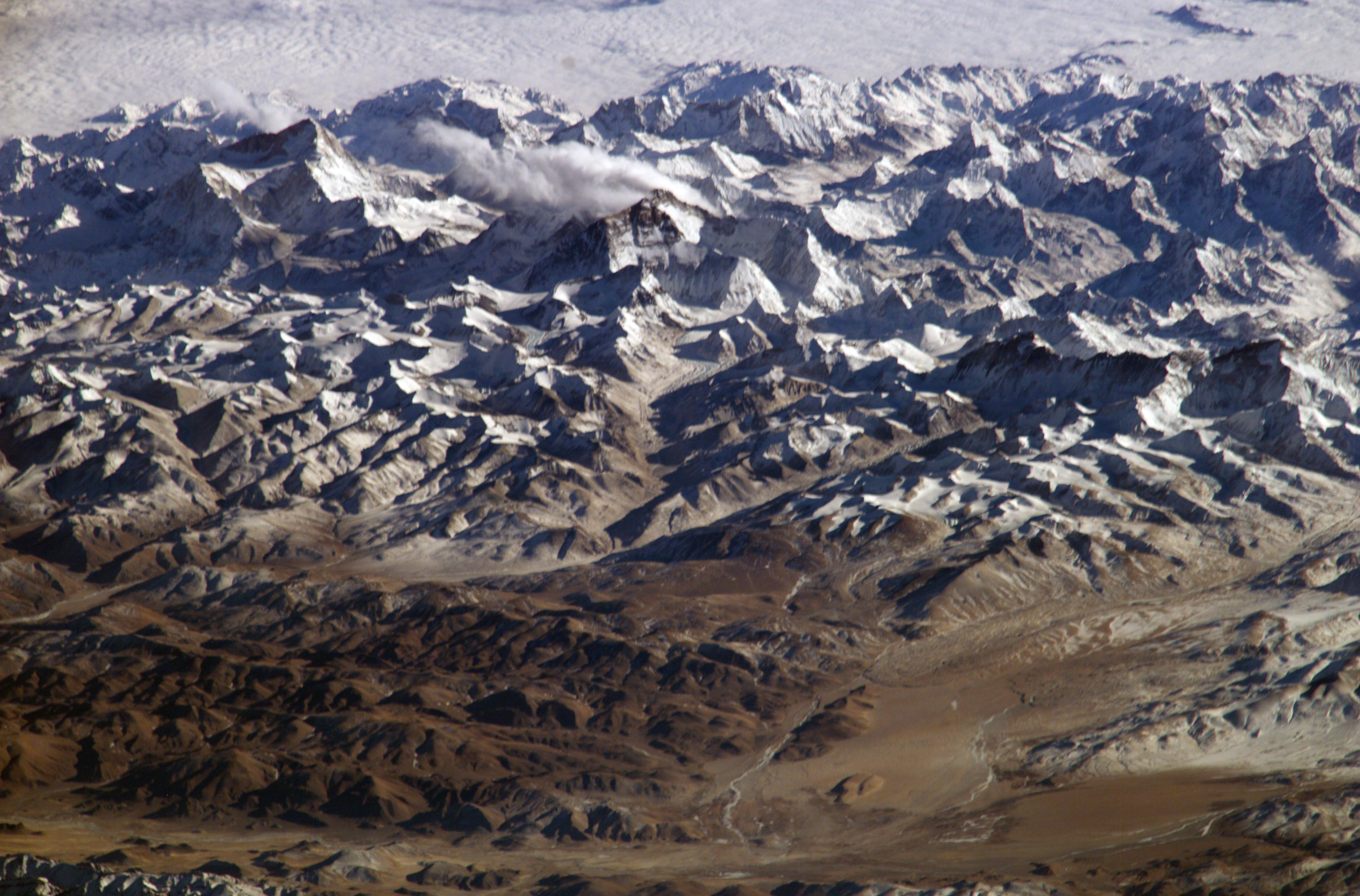

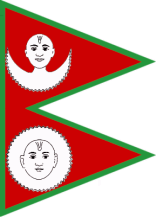
- Flag

- Location in Nepal
- Coordinates: 28°26′N 81°31′E
- Country: Nepal
- Zone: Karnali Zone
- District: Humla District

Population (1991)
  - Total: 965
- Time zone: UTC+5:45 (Nepal Time)

Kuti is a village and municipality in Humla District in the Karnali Zone of north-western Nepal. At the time of the 1991 Nepal census it had a population of 965 persons living in 176 individual households.
