= Maila =

Maila माइला
- Municipality
- Location in Nepal
- Coordinates: 29.64°N 81.74°E
- Country: Nepal
- Zone: Karnali Zone
- District: Humla District

Population (1991)
  - Total: 3,095
- Time zone: UTC+5:45 (Nepal Time)

Maila is a town and municipality in Humla District in the Karnali Zone of north-western Nepal. At the time of the 1991 Nepal census, it had a population of 3095 people living in 590 individual households.
