= Saya, Nepal =

Coordinates: 29°47′N 81°56′E

Saya, Nepal साया
- Municipality
- Interactive map of Saya, Nepal
- Country: Nepal
- Zone: Karnali Zone
- District: Humla District

Population (1991)
  - Total: 1,422
- Time zone: UTC+5:45 (Nepal Time)

Saya is a village and municipality in Humla District in the Karnali Zone of north-western Nepal. At the time of the 1991 Nepal census it had a population of 1422 persons living in 268 individual households.
