= Ripa, Nepal =

Ripa, Nepal रिपा
- Municipality
- Country: Nepal
- Zone: Karnali Zone
- District: Humla District

Population (1991)
  - Total: 1,517
- Time zone: UTC+5:45 (Nepal Time)

Ripa is a village and municipality in Humla District in the Karnali Zone of north-western Nepal. At the time of the 1991 Nepal census it had a population of 1517 persons living in 289 individual households.
