= Cavani =

Cavani may refer to:

- Edinson Cavani (born 1987), Uruguayan footballer
- Ernesto Filippi Cavani (born 1950), former Uruguayan football referee
- Liliana Cavani (born 1933), Italian director and screenwriter
- Stade Cavani, a stadium on Mayotte, a French territory in the Indian Ocean
