= Giuseppe Riva =

Italian painter (1834–1916)

Giuseppe Riva (4 November 1834 in Ivrea – 10 November 1916) was an Italian lawyer and painter, known for portraits, historical paintings, and landscapes.

He was a resident of Milan. One of his masterworks was While reading a memorial plaque for the Calvinist Covenanters, Catherine de' Medici surprised by Mary Stuart, sent to the Exhibition of Fine Arts at Turin in 1883. To the same exhibition in 1887, he sent Ultimi istanti di Cola di Rienzi, last Tribune of Rome. In 1872 at the Milan Exposition, he displayed, several half-figure portraits. At the 1883 Rome Exposition, he displayed Two Shepherdesses, an Idyll. Another painter of the same name was active in Bergamo and Rome (1861–1941).
