= Francesco Ripa (footballer, born 1974) =

Italian footballer

Personal information
- Date of birth: 7 April 1974 (age 52)
- Place of birth: Porto San Giorgio, Italy
- Height: 1.85 m (6 ft 1 in)
- Position: Goalkeeper

Team information
- Current team: Recanatese (GK coach)

Youth career
- Sangiorgese

Senior career*
Years	Team	Apps	(Gls)
1993–1997	Carpi	52	(0)
1994–1995	→ Perugia (loan)	0	(0)
1997–1998	Fermana	29	(0)
1998–2003	Cosenza	47	(0)
2001–2002	→ Pisa (loan)	32	(0)
2003–2004	Ravenna	15	(0)
2004–2005	Sora	46	(0)
2005–2010	Foligno	100	(0)
2010–2011	Perugia	16	(0)
2011–2012	Santegidiese		
2012–2013	Sangiorgese 1922		

International career
1994	Italy U–21	1	(0)

Managerial career
- 2013–2015: Sambenedettese (GK coach)
- 2015: Birkirkara (GK coach)
- 2017: Ancona (GK coach)
- 2018–2022: Fermana (GK coach)
- 2022–: Recanatese (GK coach)
- * Club domestic league appearances and goals

Francesco Ripa (born 7 April 1974) is an Italian football coach and a former player who works as a goalkeepers coach with Recanatese.

== Biography ==
Born in Porto San Giorgio, Marche, Ripa started his career at Sangiorgese of Eccellenza Marche. He then moved to Carpi, Fermana and then Cosenza (in co-ownership deal with Genoa until 2001, exchanged with Salvatore Soviero in 1998.) With Cosenza, he played 5 Serie B seasons (1 season loaned to Serie C1 club Pisa.)

In mid-2003 he joined Ravenna and in January 2004 moved to Sora. Since 2005, he spent 5 seasons at Foligno, which he played 17, 31, 32, 20 and 0 games respectively. In the last season he was the backup of Andrea Rossini and Luca Tomassini. In 2010–11 season, he played for Serie D club Perugia, shared the starting role with Lorenzo Riommi, winning Group E champion and promoted back to professional football.

In October 2011 he joined another Serie D club Santegidiese.
