= Khagalgaun =

Khagalgaun खगालगाउँ
- Municipality
- Location in Nepal
- Coordinates: 30.08°N 81.69°E
- Country: Nepal
- Zone: Karnali Zone
- District: Humla District

Population (1991)
  - Total: 632
- Time zone: UTC+5:45 (Nepal Time)

Khagalgaun is a village and municipality in Humla District in the Karnali Zone of north-western Nepal. At the time of the 1991 Nepal census, it had a population of 632 persons living in 92 individual households.
