= Muchu =

Muchu मुचु
- Village (Ward council)
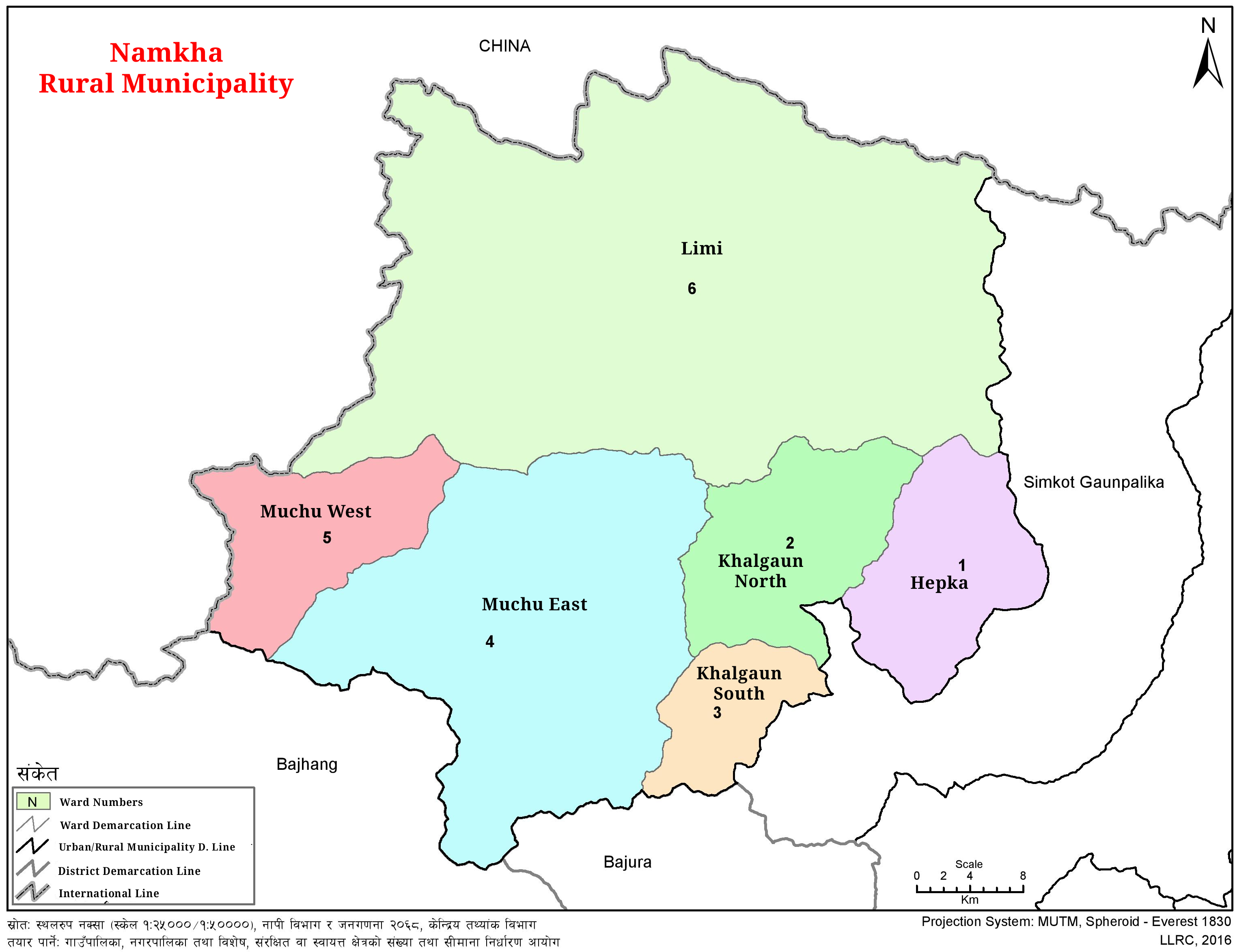

- Location in province Muchu (Nepal)
- Coordinates: 30.06°N 81.46°E
- Country: Nepal
- Province: Karnali Province
- District: Humla District
- Rural municipality: Namkha
- Ward: Ward No. 4 & 5

Government
  - Type: Ward council

Population (2011)
  - Total: 916
- Time zone: UTC+5:45 (Nepal Time)

Muchu is a village in Namkha rural municipality in Humla District in the Karnali Province of north-western Nepal. Previously Muchu was a separate Village Development Committee which merged with other neighbouring villages and restructured as Namkha rural council. Muchu was thus divided into two wards (ward no. 4 & 5). At the time of the 1991 Nepal census it had a population of 917 persons living in 164 individual households. and at the time of 2011 Nepal census it had 916 individuals.

Muchu Village
Ward No.	Village	Area (km2)	Population (2011)
4	Muchu East (Yalbang)	586.25	456
5	Muchu West	168.54	460
	Muchu	754.79	916
