= Simikot =

Simikot सिमिकोट
- District Headquarters
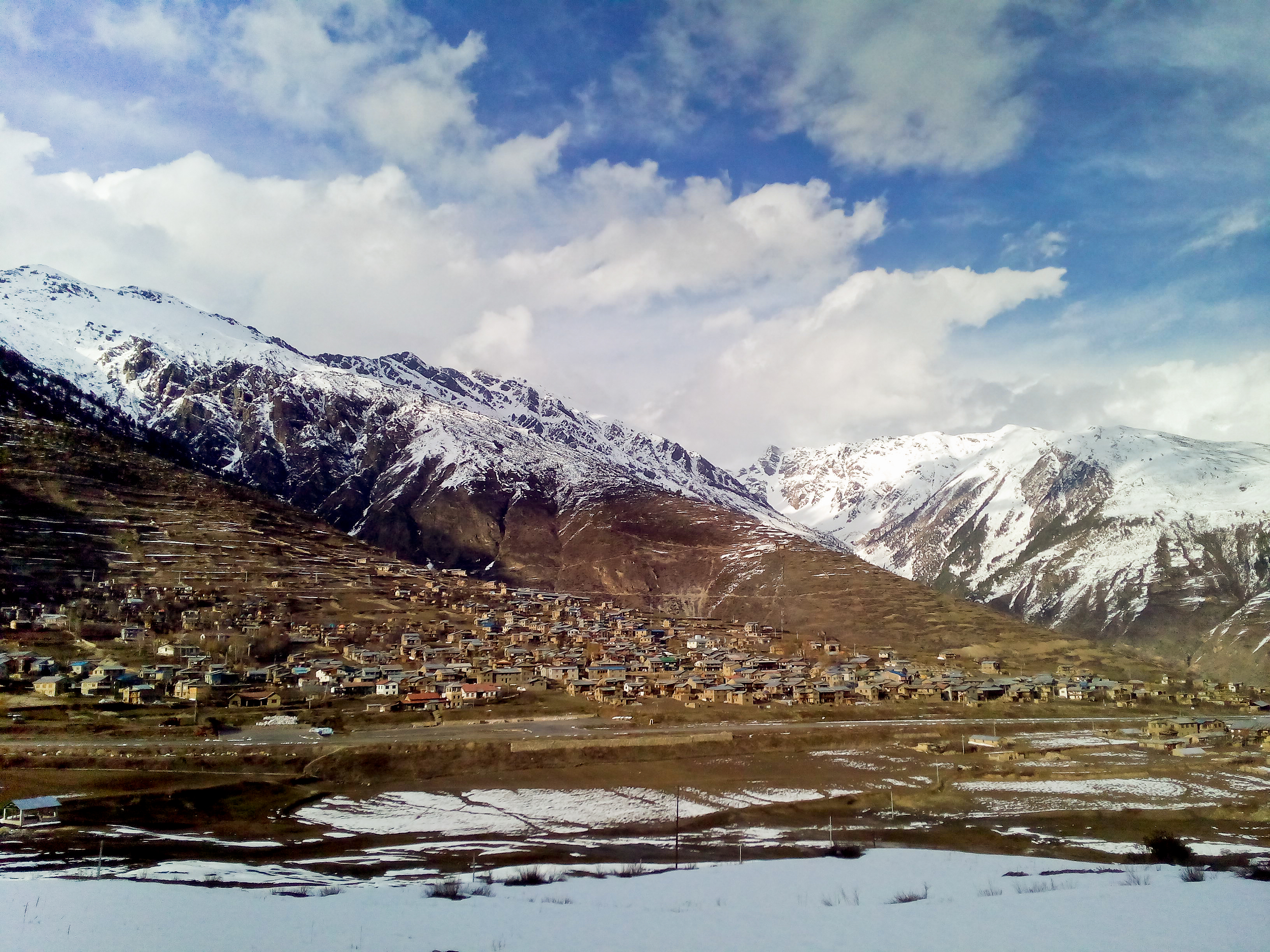

- Location in Nepal
- Coordinates: 29°58′18″N 81°49′15″E
- Country: Nepal
- Province: Karnali
- District: Humla

Area
  - Total: 785.89 km^{2} (303.43 sq mi)
  - Rank: 18th largest RM (in country); 6th largest (in province)
- Elevation: 2,910 m (9,550 ft)

Population (2011)
  - Total: 11,557
  - Density: 14.706/km^{2} (38.087/sq mi)
- Time zone: UTC+5:45 (NST)
- Website: simkotmun.gov.np

Simikot is the administrative headquarters of Humla District of Karnali Zone in the mountain region of northwestern Nepal.

== Significance ==
Lying at an altitude of just over 2,900 metres or 9,500 feet on a gentle slope high above the Humla Karnali River, Simikot lies on an ancient trade-cum-pilgrimage route to Mount Kailash. Mount Kailash is located in the Purang County of the Tibetan Autonomous Region, China, which borders Humla district of Nepal to the north. In the April 2015 Nepal earthquake, the popular Tatopani-Zhangmu route for the pilgrimage to Mount Kailash was badly damaged. In the aftermath of this earthquake the traffic for the annual pilgrimage to Mount Kailash shifted to Humla. Pilgrims would fly from Kathmandu to Nepalgunj, and then from Nepalgunj to Simikot. At Simikot, they would either spend a night in this village's few hotels, or would straightaway be taken in helicopter flights to Hilsa, from where they would cross into Tibet (China)..In 2025, 10 thousand pilgrims visit Mt Kailash last year through this Simikot route.

== Transport ==
Access to Simikot from developed parts of Nepal is mainly by air/bus. Simikot Airport's relatively short 549 metres (1,800 ft) runway at nearly 3,000 metre elevation requires passenger planes with STOL characteristics such as Dornier Do 28 and de Havilland Twin Otter.

You can take direct bus from Kathmandu/surkhet via karnali highway to reach simikot.However a rough road has been built from the Tibet Autonomous Region border crossing at Hilsa, 51 kilometres (32 mi) WNW

== Media ==
Simikot has two Community radio Stations: Radio Karnali Aawaj at 94.2 MHz and Radio Kailash at 103.4 MHz.

== See also ==
- UN map of Humla District
- Thubron, Colin (2011). To a Mountain in Tibet. New York: Harper Collins.
- Bubriski, Kevin and Abhimanyu Pandey (2018). Kailash Yatra: a Long Walk to Mt Kailash through Humla. New Delhi: Penguin Random House.
