= Humla District =

Coordinates: 29°58′N 81°50′E

Humla District हुम्ला जिल्ला
- District
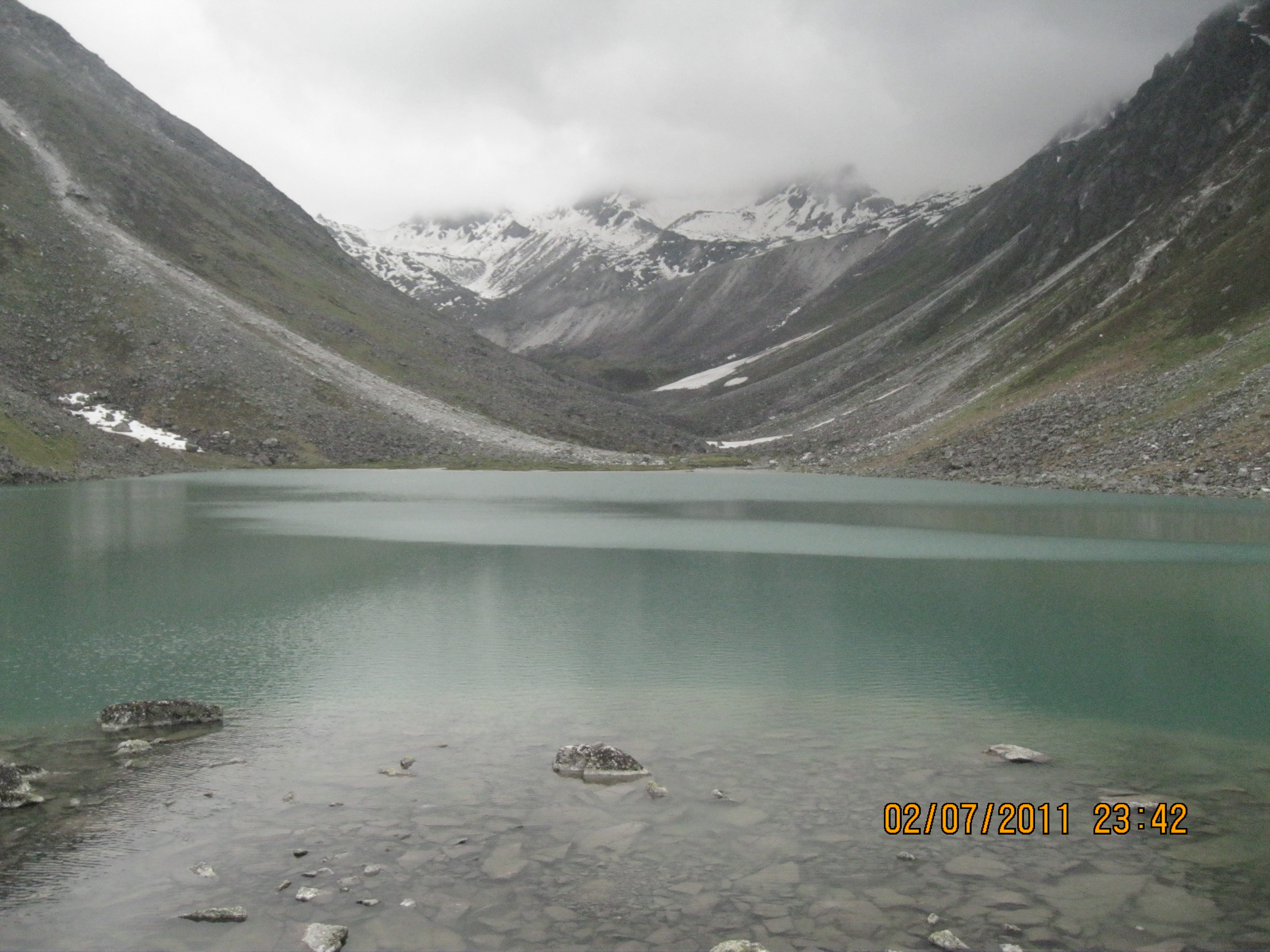
- Saatpokhari lake in Humla

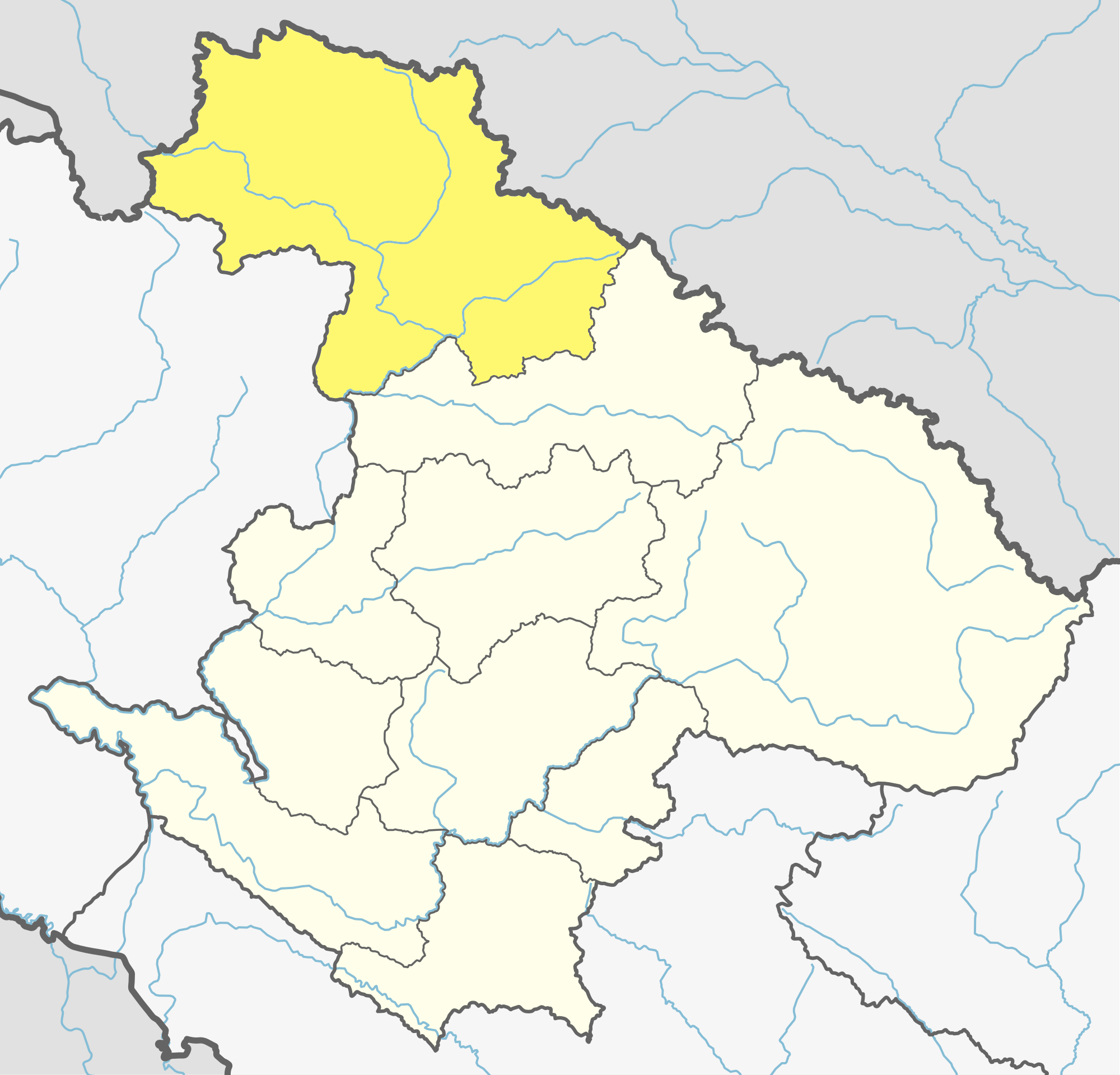
- Location of Humla District (dark yellow) in Karnali
- Country: Nepal
- Province: Karnali Province
- Admin HQ.: Simikot

Area
  - Total: 5,655 km^{2} (2,183 sq mi)
  - Rank: 2nd

Population (2011)
  - Total: 50,858
  - Density: 8.993/km^{2} (23.29/sq mi)
- Time zone: UTC+05:45 (NPT)
- Website: www.ddchumla.gov.np

Humla (Note: Nepali: हुम्ला, romanized: Humlā) is a district in Karnali Province, located in northwestern Nepal. It is one of the seventy-seven districts of Nepal and covers an area of 5,655 km^{2} (2,183 sq mi), making it the second-largest district in Nepal by area. Its administrative headquarters is Simikot. According to the 2011 census, the district had a population of 50,858. Namkha Rural Municipality, located in Humla, is the largest rural municipality in Nepal by area.

== Geography and climate ==
Climate Zone	Elevation Range	% of Area
Subtropical	1,000 to 2,000 meters 3,300 to 6,600 ft.	2.3%
Temperate	2,000 to 3,000 meters 6,400 to 9,800 ft.	8.9%
Subalpine	3,000 to 4,000 meters 9,800 to 13,100 ft.	19.4%
Alpine	4,000 to 5,000 meters 13,100 to 16,400 ft.	58.7%
Nival	above 5,000 meters	10.7%

== Nature ==
Wild yaks were once thought to be regionally extinct in Nepal, but was rediscovered in Humla in 2014.

== Demographics ==
Historical population
Census year	Pop.	±% p.a.
1981	20,303	—
1991	34,383	+5.41%
2001	40,595	+1.67%
2011	50,858	+2.28%
2021	55,496	+0.88%
Source: Citypopulation

At the time of the 2021 Nepal census, Humla District had a population of 55,394. 10.96% of the population is under 5 years of age. It has a literacy rate of 75.74% and a sex ratio of 986 females per 1000 males. The entire population lives in rural areas.

Castes/ethnic groups in Humla district (2021)
1. Chhetri (36.6%)
2. Thakuri (18.4%)
3. Kami (9.96%)
4. Bhote (8.44%)
5. Byasi (6.98%)
6. Bahun (6.39%)
7. Damai (4.18%)
8. Tamang (2.73%)
9. Sarki (2.64%)
10. Magar (1.18%)
11. Gurung (0.92%)
12. Others (1.60%)

Khas people are the largest ethnic group in Humla, comprising 78% of the population, with Chhetris forming the largest subgroup. Khas Dalits make up 17% of the population, with Kami forming the largest subgroup. Hill Janjatis make up 21% of the population, with Bhote forming the largest subgroup. Byansis make up 6% of the population.

Languages of Humla district (2021)
1. Nepali (81.8%)
2. Bhote (9.14%)
3. Khash (5.73%)
4. Magar Kham (1.35%)
5. Others (1.96%)

At the time of the 2021 census, 81.82% of the population spoke Nepali, 9.14% Bhote, 5.73% Khash, and 1.35% Magar Kham as their first language. In 2011, 87.3% of the population spoke Nepali as their first language.

Religion in Humla District (2021)
Religion	Percent
Hinduism	87.45%
Buddhism	12.15%
Other or not stated	0.40%

== Administration ==
The district consists of 7 Municipalities, all of which are rural municipalities. These are as follows:

- Simkot Rural Municipality
- Namkha Rural Municipality
- Kharpunath Rural Municipality
- Sarkegad Rural Municipality
- Chankheli Rural Municipality
- Adanchuli Rural Municipality
- Tajakot Rural Municipality

=== Former Village Development Committees ===
Prior to the restructuring of the district, Humla District consisted of the following municipalities and village development committees:

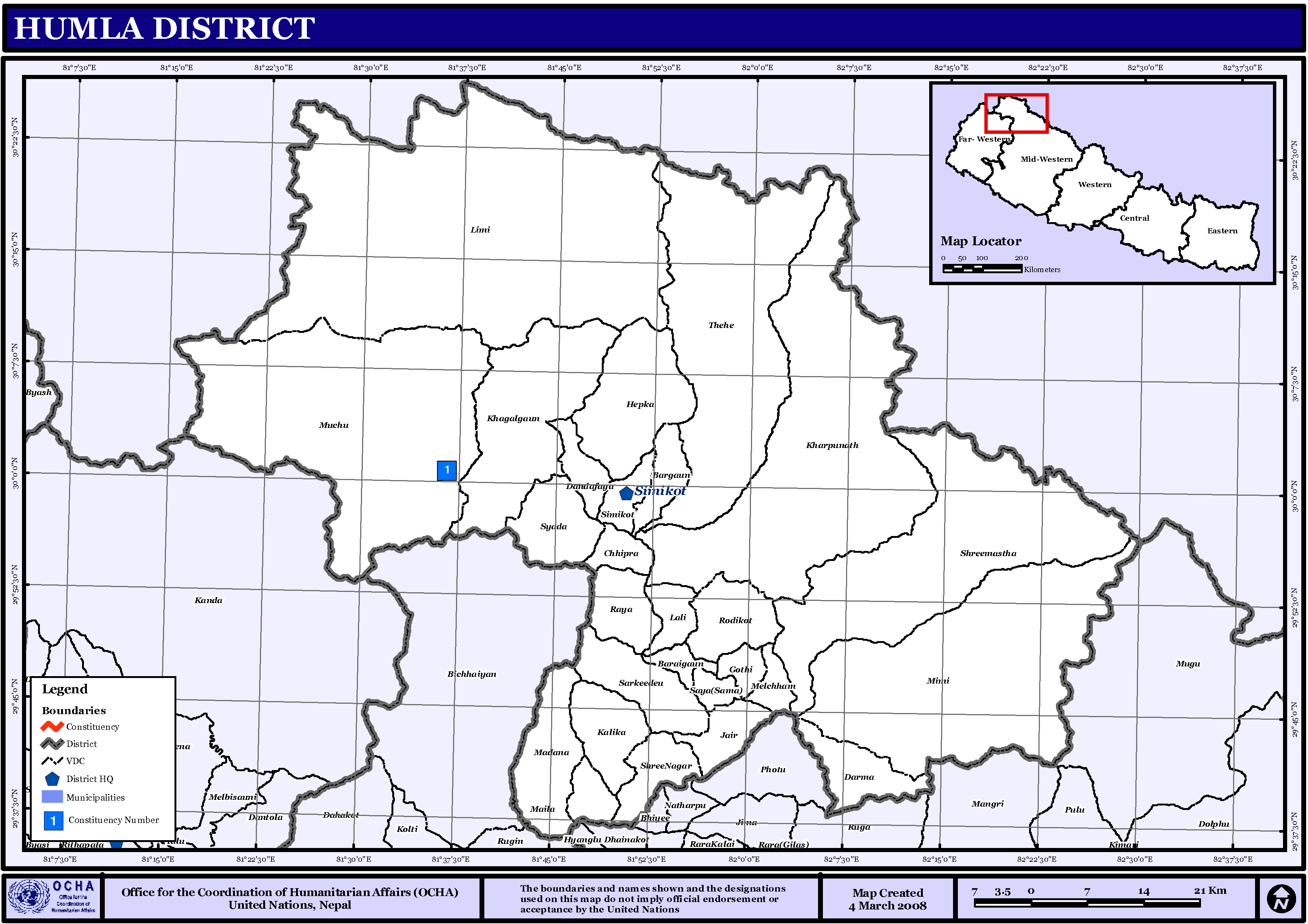
Map of the VDC/s in Humla District

- Baraigaun
- Bargaun
- Chhipra
- Dami
- Dandaphaya
- Gothi
- Hepka
- Jaur
- Kalika
- Kalkhe
- Kermi
- Khagalgaun
- Kharpunath
- Lali
- Lauthi
- Limi
- Madana
- Maila
- Melchham
- Mimi
- Muchu
- Raya
- Ripa
- Rodikot
- Sarkideu
- Saya
- Srinagar
- Srimastha
- Syada
- Thechaya
- Yanchu
- Simikot

== Health care ==
- Central/regional/zonal hospitals: 0
- District hospitals: 1
- Primary healthcare centres: 0
- Health posts: 10
- Sub-health posts: 16
- Number of doctors: 6
- Number of nurses: 35

Although there is a district hospital as well as primary health care centers, these are not enough for providing health services. The small health centers in many VDCs are often without Auxiliary Health Workers (AHWs), Auxiliary Nurse Midwives (ANMs) and Community Health Workers (CHWs). Many people still believe in Dhami and Jhakri and often resort to local practices before seeking allopathic treatment.

The Nepal Trust, which has been working in Humla since 1996, was one of the first NGOs in the district to address development (especially healthcare) issues at the grass-roots level. PHASE Nepal is a non profit organization which coordinates with the District Health Office in Simikot to provide comprehensive primary health services to the communities of Maila and Melchham, two of the most isolated VDCs of the district; as well as the neighboring villages who also received these services. The Trust was the only organization allowed to continue its development work throughout the district during the Maoist insurgency. The Torpa clinic was built by the trust almost 15 years ago to address the immediate need for health services. To date, the Trust has expanded services throughout the district including improvements made to the district hospital. Currently, Trust initiatives are related to ante/post natal care and infant mortality reduction programs. With its head office in Kathmandu, the Nepal Trust has its own satellite office and guest house in its Simikot office, which acts as a social enterprise (the first built in West Nepal) and along with healthcare works in education, renewable energy, heritage preservation, WASH, food security and agriculture, sustainable tourism development and income generation. Nepal Trust has been managing the Great Himalaya Trail Development Program since 2008.

== Tourism ==
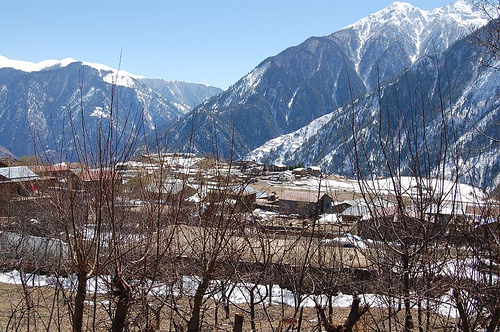
Simikot-headquarter of Humla

Humla lies in the far west of Nepal, on the border between Nepal and China, and is used as the starting point for trekking and mountaineering, accessible from Simikot Airport. The trekking route to Tibet also starts from Simikot.

=== Trekking ===
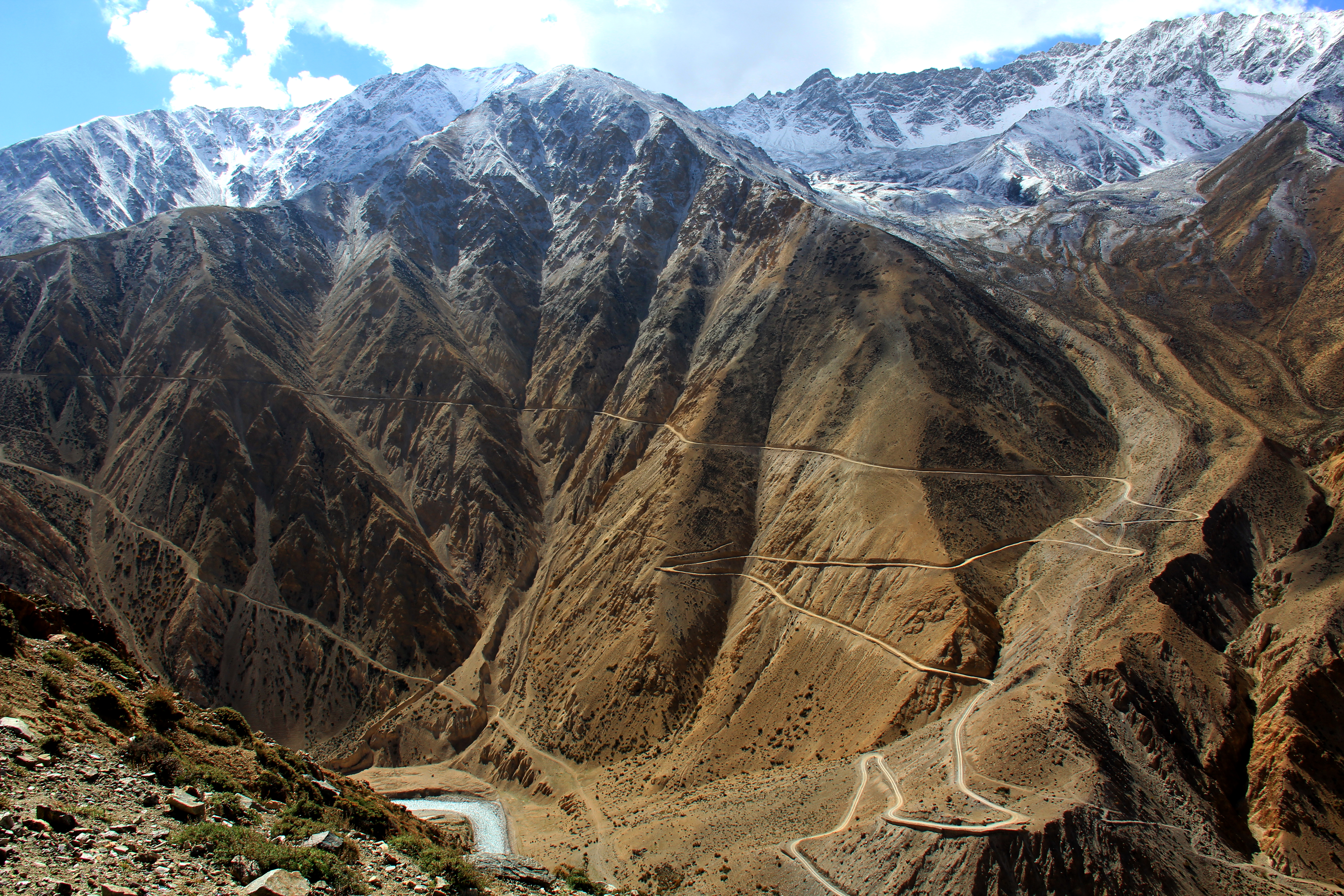
The road descending from Nara La (pass) 4535 m Humla district, Nepal to the border of Tibet at Hilsa on the bank of Karnali River. The road is connected from Lake Manasarovar close by Mount Kailash in Tibet.

The Nepal section of The Great Himalaya Trail ends in Humla at Hilsa at the border with Tibet. The Humla district is a historic part of the Tibetan Buddhist religious tradition, with several points of interest for the history, culture and values of a typical Buddhist life. It has eleven small villages of Tibetan origin. The Nyin Community and the Limi Valley are inhabited by Buddhist communities.

=== Mt Kailash pilgrimage ===
In recent years, Humla has grown in significance as a preferred route for the pilgrimage to Mount Kailash in Tibet. The route through Humla has historically involved taking an ancient foot trail from Simikot to Hilsa, that goes along the mountain slopes on the left side of the Humla Karnali river. Both historically and in the present times, this route has been used by locals for trading at the nearby old trade mart of Taklakot in Tibet, and for undertaking the pilgrimage to the nearby holy sites of Lake Manasarovar and Mount Kailash in Tibet. This route involves a 4-5 day walk from Simikot to Hilsa, with overnight stops at a few villages on the way. One needs to cross the 4,530m high Nara La pass on this route. However, with the surge in the popularity of this route for the Kailash pilgrimage, travel companies offer helicopter flights to cover the distance from Simikot from Hilsa, which takes about 20 minutes. Furthermore, a motorable road is in the process of being built from Hilsa to Simikot. Nonetheless, if one wishes to fully experience the physically and spiritually elevating effects of a mountain pilgrimage, then the slower, physically more engaged way of walking this route is the better way of doing this pilgrimage. For an even greater immersive experience into the mountain cultures and ecology of this remote part of the Nepal Himalayas, one can take a detour at the confluence of the Humla Karnali and Salli Khola rivers, and thereby go to Hilsa via the Nyalu La pass and the Limi valley. On this second route, one can take another detour to visit the Lapcha La pass, very close to the border with China, from where, on a clear day, one can get majestic open views of Lake Manasarovar and Mount Kailash.

Currently, Humla can only be reached by air or on foot. Road transport is still under construction and may take several years to be fully accessible.

==== Sarki Temple ====
The Sarki Temple, in Sirkigad Rural Municipality, is dedicated to the ancestral deity of the Sarki community. It is believed that if someone seeks justice after being wronged or committing a crime, they will receive fair and strict judgment upon visiting this temple. Just like the wind deity, the Sarki deity is considered a powerful god who has the ability to dominate and control other deities.

== See also ==
- Karnali Province
- Zones of Nepal
