= Bagchaur =

Bagchaur बागचौर
- Municipality नगरपालिका
- Location in Nepal
- Coordinates: 28.47°N 82.28°E
- Country: Nepal
- Province: Karnali
- District: Salyan
- Established: 19 September 2015

Government
  - Type: Mayor-council
  - Mayor: Mr. JanakRaj Gautam (NC)
  - Deputy mayor: Mrs. Sumnima DC(Oli) (NCP)

Area
  - Total: 163.14 km^{2} (62.99 sq mi)
- Elevation: 1,320 m (4,330 ft)

Population (2011)
  - Total: 34,118
  - Density: 209.13/km^{2} (541.65/sq mi)
- Time zone: UTC+5:45 (NST)
- Website: official website

Local levels of Salyan District

Bagchaur (Nepali: बागचौर) is an urban municipality located in Salyan district of Karnali Province of Nepal.

The total area of the municipality is 163.14 square kilometres (62.99 mi^{2}) and the total population of the municipality as of 2011 Nepal census is 34,118 individuals. The municipality is divided into total 12 wards.

The municipality was established on 19 September 2015 merging Tharmare, Sibaratha, Kotbara, Kotmala and Pipal Neta. On 10 March 2017 the Government of Nepal announced 744 local level units as per the new constitution of Nepal 2015, thus Baphukhola VDC was Incorporated with municipality.

== Demographics ==
At the time of the 2011 Nepal census, Bagchaur Municipality had a population of 34,143. Of these, 100.0% spoke Nepali as their first language.

In terms of ethnicity/caste, 71.5% were Chhetri, 11.0% Kami, 5.3% Magar, 3.4% Thakuri, 3.1% Hill Brahmin, 2.8% Damai/Dholi, 1.4% Sanyasi/Dasnami, 1.0% Sarki, 0.3% Badi, 0.1% other Dalit and 0.1% other Terai.

In terms of religion, 99.4% were Hindu, 0.5% Christian and 0.1% Buddhist.

In terms of literacy, 66.9% could read and write, 2.1% could only read and 30.9% could neither read nor write.
