= Phalawang =

Phalawang फलावाङ
- Village development committee
- Location in Nepal
- Coordinates: 28.27°N 82.25°E
- Country: Nepal
- Zone: Rapti Zone
- District: Salyan District

Population (2020)
  - Total: 20,000
- Time zone: UTC+5:45 (Nepal Time)

Phalawang (Newar: फलवाङ) is a village development committee in Salyan District in the Rapti Zone of western-central Nepal. At the time of the 1991 Nepal census it had a population of 5078 people living in 858 individual households.

== History ==
Phalawang historically was a kingdom ruled by rajas; in 1837, Tej Bahadur Shah became Raja of Phalawang. The main building of note is the Phalawang Palace which houses documents in the eastern wing. And in 1980 MITRA LAL BUDHATHOKI BECOME THE HEAD of Phalawang district he had helped so many people in Phalawang

== Geography ==
Phalawang lies on a mountain top, with river valleys to both the north and south. Highway 11 (also known as Rapti Rajmang) skirts the eastern perimeters of the VDC, connecting Tulsipur in the south to Jhula in the north. Phulawang VDC is located in the southeastern part of Salyan District, bordering Tulsipur, Pawan Nagar, Shantinagar and Baghmare to the south in Dang Deokhuri District, Kavra to the west, Karagithi to the northwest, Chhayachhetra to the north, Tribeni to the northeast, and Rim and Dhanwang to the east.

Other settlements in the area include Tribenghat, Gaunde, Lotaune, Dhunge Bagar, Baluwa and Dangchuli.
