= Bangad Kupinde =

Bangad Kupinde बनगाड कुपिन्ड़े
- Municipality नगरपालिका
- Location in Nepal
- Coordinates: 28°32′00″N 82°02′08″E
- Country: Nepal
- Province: Karnali
- District: Salyan Biggest city: Sallibajar
- Established: 10 March 2017

Government
  - Type: Mayor-council
  - Mayor: Mr. Karna Bahadur Budhathoki (NCP)
  - Deputy mayor: Mr. Purushottam Aacharya (NC)

Area
  - Total: 338.21 km^{2} (130.58 sq mi)
- Highest elevation: 2,300 m (7,500 ft)
- Lowest elevation: 550 m (1,800 ft)

Population (2011)
  - Total: 36,052
  - Density: 106.60/km^{2} (276.08/sq mi)
- Time zone: UTC+5:45 (NST)
- Website: official website

Bangad Kupinde (Nepali: बनगाड कुपिण्डे) is an urban municipality located in Salyan District of Karnali Province of Nepal.

The total area of the municipality is 338.21 square kilometres (130.58 mi^{2}) and the total population of the municipality is 36,052 individuals. The municipality is divided into total 12 wards. The headquarters of municipality is located in ward no. 1 which is called Devisthal.

On 10 March 2017 Government of Nepal announced 744 local level units as per the new constitution of Nepal 2015. Thus, Bangad Kupinde municipality came into existence on 10 March 2017 merging the former following Villages: Devasthal, Bame Banghad, Mulkhola, Ghagari Pipal, Kubhinde, Majh Khanda and Nigalchula.

== Demographics ==
At the time of the 2011 Nepal census, Bangad Kupinde Municipality had a population of 36,135. Of these, 99.8% spoke Nepali, 0.1% Hindi and 0.1% other languages as their first language.

In terms of ethnicity/caste, 46.5% were Chhetri, 23.5% Magar, 14.6% Kami, 5.2% Damai/Dholi, 4.6% Sanyasi/Dasnami, 1.7% Hill Brahmin, 1.6% Thakuri, 1.1% Sarki, 0.3% Badi, 0.2% Gaine, 0.1% Majhi, 0.1% Musalman, 0.1% Newar, 0.1% other Terai and 0.1% others.

In terms of religion, 97.4% were Hindu, 2.4% Christian and 0.1% Muslim.

In terms of literacy, 57.7% could read and write, 3.3% could only read and 38.9% could neither read nor write.
