= Darma Rural Municipality =

Rural municipality in Karnali Province, Nepal

Darma दार्मा
- Rural Municipality
- Location in Nepal
- Coordinates: 29.68077°N 82.14632°E
- Country: Nepal
- Province: Karnali Province
- District: Salyan District

Population (2011)
  - Total: 19,966
- Time zone: UTC+5:45 (NST)
- Website: https://darmamun.gov.np

Darma (Nepali: दर्मा गाउँपालिका) is a rural municipality located in Salyan District of Karnali Province of Nepal.

It Has established by including 3 VDCs named Dhakadam, Valchaur and Darmakot. The total area of darma rural municipality is 81.46 sq.km

== Demographics ==
At the time of the 2011 Nepal census, Darma Rural Municipality had a population of 19,966. Of these, 100.0% spoke Nepali as their first language.

In terms of ethnicity/caste, 62.7% were Chhetri, 19.7% Kami, 11.2% Thakuri, 2.5% Damai/Dholi, 1.8% Hill Brahmin, 1.0% Magar, 0.9% Sarki, 0.1% other Terai and 0.1% others.

In terms of religion, 99.5% were Hindu and 0.5% Christian.

In terms of literacy, 61.5% could read and write, 2.2% could only read and 36.3% could neither read nor write.
