= Kapurkot Rural Municipality =

Rural municipality in Karnali Province, Nepal

Coordinates: 28°14′N 82°21′E

Kapurkot (Nepali: कपुरकोट गाउँपालिका) is a rural municipality located in Salyan District of Karnali Province of Nepal.

The population in 2011 was 18,273.

== Demographics ==
At the time of the 2011 Nepal census, Kapurkot Rural Municipality had a population of 18,273. Of these, 99.7% spoke Nepali, 0.1% Sign language and 0.2% other languages as their first language.

In terms of ethnicity/caste, 42.4% were Chhetri, 35.5% Magar, 12.0% Kami, 3.7% Damai/Dholi, 1.9% Thakuri, 1.5% Sarki, 1.3% Hill Brahmin, 1.0% Sanyasi/Dasnami, 0.2% other Terai, 0.1% Badi, 0.1% Musalman, 0.1% Teli, 0.1% Tharu and 0.3% others.

In terms of religion, 93.4% were Hindu, 5.6% Buddhist, 0.9% Christian and 0.1% Muslim.

In terms of literacy, 66.4% could read and write, 2.3% could only read and 31.3% could neither read nor write.
