= Siddha Kumakh Rural Municipality =

Rural municipality in Karnali Province, Nepal

Siddha Kumakh (Nepali: सिद्ध कुमाख गाउँपालिका) is a rural municipality located in Salyan District of Karnali Province of Nepal.

== Demographics ==
At the time of the 2011 Nepal census, Siddha Kumakh Rural Municipality had a population of 13,593. Of these, 100.0% spoke Nepali as their first language.

In terms of ethnicity/caste, 78.2% were Chhetri, 9.3% Kami, 3.9% Damai/Dholi, 2.6% Sarki, 2.5% Sanyasi/Dasnami, 1.8% Magar, 0.8% Thakuri, 0.5% Hill Brahmin, 0.3% Badi and 0.1% others.

In terms of religion, 98.3% were Hindu and 1.7% Christian.

In terms of literacy, 54.1% could read and write, 6.6% could only read and 39.1% could neither read nor write.
