= Chhatreshwori Rural Municipality =

Rural municipality in Karnali Province, Nepal

Chhatreshwori (Nepali: छत्रेश्‍वरी गाउँपालिका) is a rural municipality located in Salyan District of Karnali Province of Nepal.

== Demographics ==
At the time of the 2011 Nepal census, Chhatreshwori Rural Municipality had a population of 21,452. Of these, 98.9% spoke Nepali, 0.5% Magar, 0.3% Urdu, 0.1% Sign language and 0.1% other languages as their first language.

In terms of ethnicity/caste, 52.1% were Chhetri, 15.0% Magar, 12.1% Kami, 5.7% Thakuri, 4.3% Hill Brahmin, 4.3% Sarki, 3.8% Sanyasi/Dasnami, 1.8% Damai/Dholi, 0.4% Musalman, 0.3% Newar, 0.2% Badi, 0.1% Tharu and 0.1% others.

In terms of religion, 97.7% were Hindu, 0.9% Buddhist, 0.8% Christian, 0.4% Muslim and 0.2% others.

In terms of literacy, 67.8% could read and write, 2.2% could only read and 29.9% could neither read nor write.
