= Kumakh Rural Municipality =

Rural municipality in Karnali Province, Nepal

Kumakh (Nepali: कुमाख गाउँपालिका) is a rural municipality located in Salyan District of Karnali Province of Nepal.

== Demographics ==
At the time of the 2011 Nepal census, Kumakh Rural Municipality had a population of 24,988. Of these, 100.0% spoke Nepali as their first language.

In terms of ethnicity/caste, 60.7% were Chhetri, 12.9% Kami, 6.8% Magar, 6.8% Thakuri, 4.1% Hill Brahmin, 3.3% Sanyasi/Dasnami, 2.5% Damai/Dholi, 0.9% Sarki, 0.9% Badi, 0.4% Gurung, 0.3% Kumal, 0.2% other Dalit, 0.2% Newar, 0.1% Lohar and 0.1% others.

In terms of religion, 99.2% were Hindu and 0.8% Christian.

In terms of literacy, 61.9% could read and write, 4.1% could only read and 33.9% could neither read nor write.
