= Kalimati Rural Municipality =

Rural municipality in Karnali Province, Nepal

Kalimati (Nepali: कालिमाटी गाउँपालिका) is a rural municipality located in Salyan District of Karnali Province of Nepal.

== Demographics ==
At the time of the 2011 Nepal census, Kalimati Rural Municipality had a population of 23,005. Of these, 96.9% spoke Nepali, 2.6% Magar, 0.3% Raute and 0.1% other languages as their first language.

In terms of ethnicity/caste, 40.8% were Chhetri, 34.6% Magar, 10.7% Kami, 3.9% Sanyasi/Dasnami, 3.6% Damai/Dholi, 3.3% Hill Brahmin, 1.2% Sarki, 0.6% Kumal, 0.4% Badi, 0.3% Gurung, 0.3% Raute, 0.2% Thakuri, 0.1% other Terai and 0.1% others.

In terms of religion, 95.7% were Hindu, 2.8% Buddhist, 1.4% Christian and 0.1% others.

In terms of literacy, 63.8% could read and write, 4.4% could only read and 31.7% could neither read nor write.
