= Badagaun, Salyan =

Badagaun बडागाउँ
- Village development committee
- Location in Nepal
- Coordinates: 28°32′0″N 82°15′0″E
- Country: Nepal
- Province: Karnali Province
- District: Salyan District

Population (1991)
  - Total: 3,283
- Time zone: UTC+5:45 (Nepal Time)

Badagaun is a village development committee in Salyan District in Karnali Province of western-central Nepal. At the time of the 1991 Nepal census it had a population of 3283 people living in 385 individual households.
