= Chande (disambiguation) =

Chande is a drum used in the traditional and classical music of South India and particularly in Yakshagana theatre art of Karnataka.

Chande may also refer to:

- Chande (Mulshi), a village in Mulshi taluka of Pune District in the state of Maharashtra, India
- Chande, Nepal, a village development committee in Salyan District in the Rapti Zone of western-central Nepal
- Andy Chande was a prominent Tanzanian businessman, philanthropist and a freemason
