= Shaarada =

Sharada Municipality शारदा नगरपालिका
- Municipality
- Location in Nepal
- Coordinates: 28.38°N 82.18°E
- Country: Nepal
- Province: Karnali
- District: Salyan

Government
  - Type: Mayor–council
  - Mayor: Prakash Bhandari (NC)
  - Deputy Mayor: Susmita Sapkota Sunar (NC)

Population (2011)
  - Total: 33,730
- Time zone: UTC+5:45 (NST)
- Area code: 088
- Website: www.shaaradamun.gov.np

Sharada Municipality (Nepali: शारदा नगरपालिका) is a municipality located in Salyan District of Karnali Province in western Nepal. This municipality was formed on May 18, 2014. It was formed by merging seven Village Development Committees: Dandagaun, Hiwalcha, Kajeri, Khalanga, Marke, Saijuwal Takura and Syanikhal.

At the time of the 1991 Nepal census, it had a population of 6,390. According to the latest census from 2011, the population in the meantime has increased to 23,730.

== Demographics ==
At the time of the 2011 Nepal census, Sharada Municipality had a population of 34,242. Of these, 99.1% spoke Nepali, 0.5% Newar and 0.1% other languages as their first language.

In terms of ethnicity/caste, 62.6% were Chhetri, 8.2% Sanyasi/Dasnami, 7.7% Kami, 5.9% Magar, 3.2% Sarki, 3.1% Newar, 3.0% Hill Brahmin, 2.9% Thakuri, 1.7% Damai/Dholi, 0.4% Badi, 0.3% Gaine, 0.3% Rai, 0.2% other Terai, 0.1% Gharti/Bhujel, 0.1% Musalman, 0.1% Tharu and 0.3% others.

In terms of religion, 97.8% were Hindu, 1.7% Christian, 0.1% Muslim and 0.3% others.

In terms of literacy, 69.9% could read and write, 5.0% could only read and 24.5% could neither read nor write.

== Climate ==
Climate data for Shaarada (Salyan Bazar), elevation 1,457 m (4,780 ft)
Month	Jan	Feb	Mar	Apr	May	Jun	Jul	Aug	Sep	Oct	Nov	Dec	Year
Mean daily maximum °C (°F)	15.6 (60.1)	17.4 (63.3)	22.5 (72.5)	27.3 (81.1)	29.0 (84.2)	27.5 (81.5)	25.6 (78.1)	25.8 (78.4)	25.2 (77.4)	23.8 (74.8)	20.2 (68.4)	17.3 (63.1)	23.1 (73.6)
Mean daily minimum °C (°F)	5.5 (41.9)	7.0 (44.6)	12.2 (54.0)	16.5 (61.7)	17.8 (64.0)	18.0 (64.4)	17.8 (64.0)	17.6 (63.7)	16.4 (61.5)	13.8 (56.8)	9.0 (48.2)	6.2 (43.2)	13.2 (55.7)
Average precipitation mm (inches)	36.8 (1.45)	32.4 (1.28)	30.7 (1.21)	29.2 (1.15)	60.8 (2.39)	182.4 (7.18)	278.6 (10.97)	230.9 (9.09)	128.6 (5.06)	46.5 (1.83)	7.3 (0.29)	17.4 (0.69)	1,081.6 (42.59)
Source 1: Australian National University
Source 2: Japan International Cooperation Agency (precipitation)
