= Fishing communities in Maharashtra =

List of fishing communities

Maharashtra is famous for its varied fresh water resources, including lakes, tanks and rivers. A number of fishing communities have developed in response to these favorable factors. These communities can be divided into:

- Specialists or indigenous groups who depend completely on fish and other aquatic resources for their subsistence
- Subsistence fishers or opportunists who depend partly on fish, and
- Groups who have recently started fishing.

Fishing communities in Maharashtra

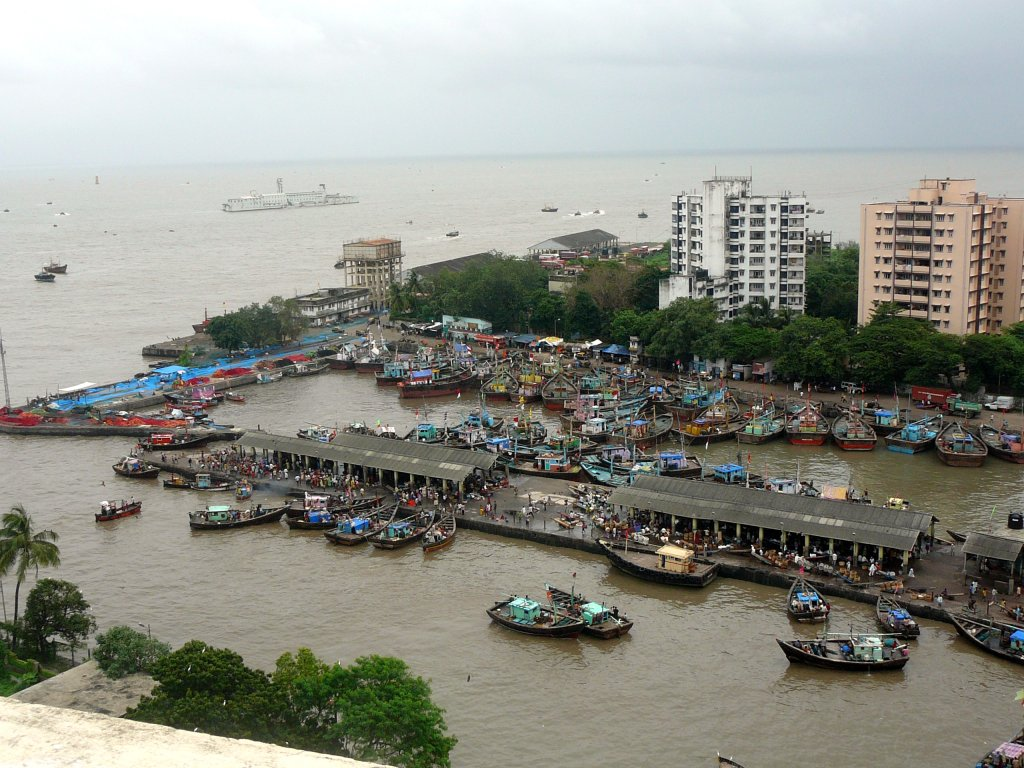
Sasson Docks (Maharashtra)

== Specialists or Indigenous fishing communities ==
=== Koli ===
Koli, the caste of Original fishermen – The Main occupation of Koli is Fishing. Primarily they are fisherman and boatman. They are adept in various methods of sea and river fishing and are regularly employed as a worker on a ferry. Their connection with water has led to them becoming the water-carrier for Hindus. People of India. Maharashtra.

=== Dhiwar ===
Dhiwar, the caste of fishermen and palanquin – bearers derives the name from a corruption of the Sanskrit ‘Dhiwara’, a fisherman (Singh 2004). It has a large number of sub-divisions of a local or occupational nature. The ‘Singadia’ or those who cultivate ‘Singada nut’; the ‘Nadha’ or those who live on banks of streams and the ‘Dhurias’ who sell parched rice. A large number of exogamous groups are also returned, either of titular or totemistic nature: such as ‘Baghmare’ or Vaghmare, tiger-slayer; ‘Godhve, a vulture; and ‘Kolhe’ or Jackal. Marriage is prohibited between members of the same sept and between first cousins. In many localities, families do not intermarry so long as they remember any relationship to have existed between them (Singh 2004). The occupations of Dhiwar are many and various. Primarily they are fisherman and boatman. They are adept in various methods of river fishing and are regularly employed as a worker on a ferry. They monopolizes growing Singade or water nuts in tanks; also grows melons, cucumbers and other vegetables on the sandy stretches along the banks of streams, but at agriculture proper they do not excel. Their connection with water has led to them becoming the water-carrier for Hindus. With the introduction of wheeled transport, these people’s occupation as carriers of palanquins or litters has dwindled.

=== Bhoi ===
Bhoi is a fishing community in this area. Bhoi are traditionally dependent upon the river Adan for their subsistence. Due to depleting fish resources their lives are in danger. Bhoi's the traditional fishermen community in Maharashtra state are mostly found in shoreline areas of the west coast of Maharashtra as well as near rivers, reservoirs, dams. From the ancient times these people used to be called as the "Palkhiche Bhoi" the tribe which wander all over carrying the Palkhi of ancient king and their families as the loyal ones. Diminishing the rule of king's and kingdom these loyal people have returned to their traditional business – fishing. This community/tribe is mostly found in District of Ratnagiri, Sindhudurga, Raigad, Mumbai and in mostly all districts of Maharashtra where the fishing occupation is traditional carried out.

=== Gabit ===
Gabit are a community found in the Konkan regions of the Indian states of Goa. Karnataka and Maharashtra.

In Goa, they are distinct from the Kharvi community found mostly in the south of that state, although they share a similar traditional occupation. The Gabits are primarily a fishing community and are concentrated in the northern talukas of Canacona, Pernem and Salcete. They are Hindus and generally live in joint family arrangements, although a movement towards the nuclear family is evident

== Subsistence or opportunists ==
=== Gond: गोंड ===
Gond is the principal tribe of the Dravidian family and perhaps the most important of the non – Aryan or forest tribes in India (Russel and Hiralal 1916). The forest provides substantial bulk for livelihood ranging from food, fuel, fodder, timber, medicine to revenue. The NTFP harvested from the forest like Mahua, gum, and Tendu leaves for Bidi rolling, medicinal plants adds valuable inputs to the economy. Agriculture is largely primitive type, generally paddy. Use of the insecticides and hybrid varieties is not common practice. There are three subdivisions of Gond viz. Raj Gond, Dadves and Mokasis (Pattnaik 2000). The derivation of the word Gond is uncertain. It is the name given to the tribe by Hindus or Muslims, as their own name for themselves is ‘Koitur’ or ‘Koi’, means human being (Russell and Hiralal 1916). Considering another view, the Gond designation given to this tribe by Telugu people, probably was being derived from ‘Konda’, meaning hill or mountain in Telugu language (Guha 1999). The Gond speaks Dravidian language of the same family as Tamil, Canarese and Telugu and therefore it is likely that they come from the south into the present dwellings. Presently Gond are spreads from Narmada in north up to Godavari in south and Chhattisgarh in east up to Khandesh in west (Rajurkar 1956).

=== Agri ===
This Community major occupation is salt making and farming. But this community also does fishing on small scale. There is very small section of this community which take fishing as full-time occupation and other section of this community does fishing to feed their family or just as a hobby.

== See also ==
- Fishing in Maharashtra
- Traditional fishing tackle of Central India
- List of Scheduled Tribes in India
- Maharashtra
