= Kubinde Daha =

Lake in Nepal

Kupinde Daha
- Nepali: कुपिण्डे ताल
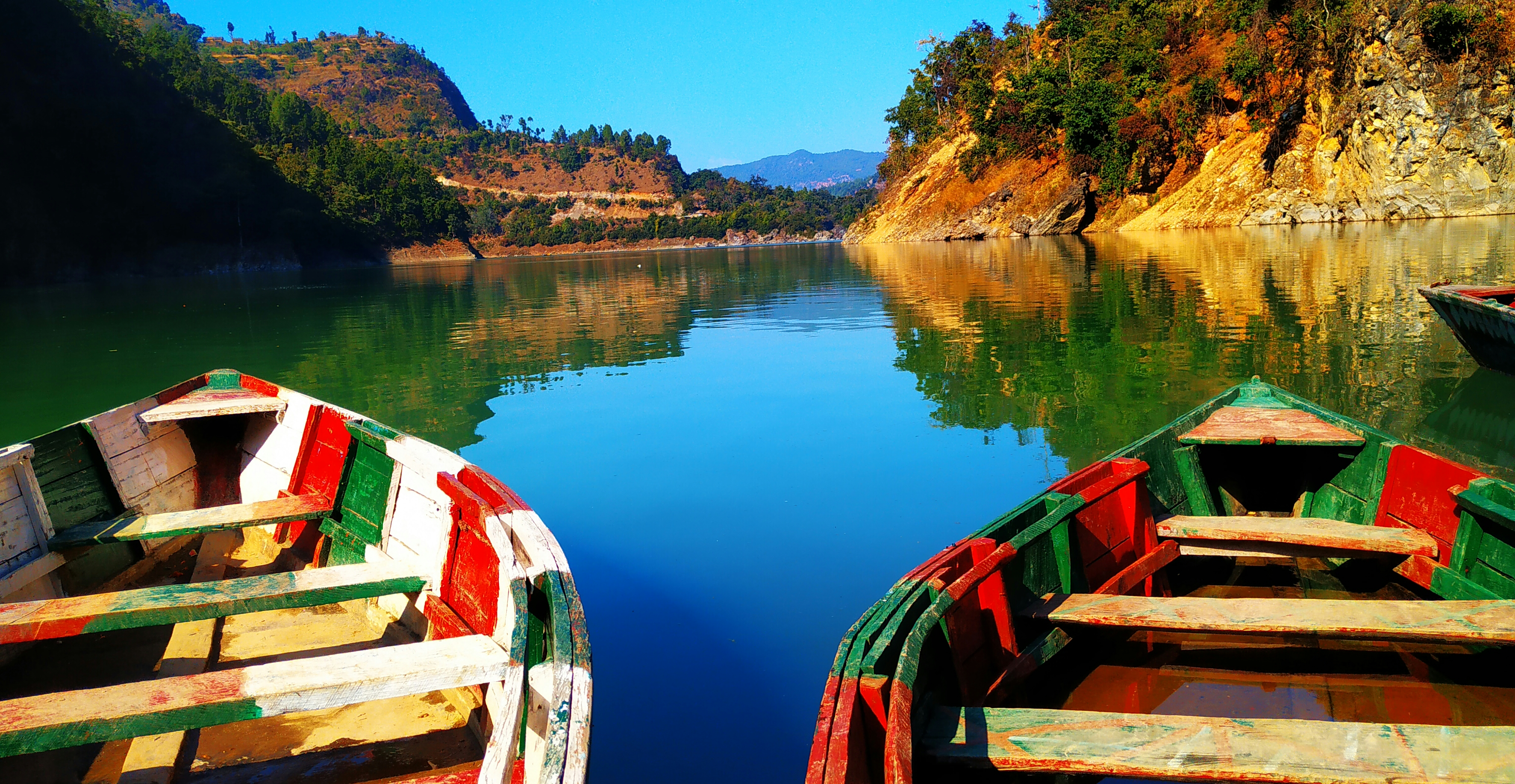

- Location within Nepal
- Location: salyan District, Karnali Province
- Coordinates: 28°40′14″N 82°17′14″E
- Type: fresh water
- Basin countries: Nepal
- Max. length: 834 m (2,736 ft)
- Max. width: 538 m (1,765 ft)
- Surface area: 24.00 ha (59.3 acres)
- Average depth: 100 m (330 ft)
- Max. depth: 1,120 m (3,670 ft)
- Water volume: 574 m^{3} (20,300 cu ft)
- Shore length^{1}: 834 m (2,736 ft)
- Surface elevation: 2,990 m (9,810 ft)
- ^{1} Shore length is not a well-defined measure.

Kupinde Daha (Nepali: कुपिण्डे ताल) is a lake in the Salyan District in the Karnali Province of Nepal. Surrounded by mountains and forests, Kupinde is two kilometers by one kilometer wide. The lake is a tourist destination, and lies next to the Baraha Temple. In the early 2000s, annual fairs were held in the area.

== Background ==
In 1971 there have been 10 wetlands of Nepal enlisted in the Ramsar site till the date. In 2009 Nepal 4th National Report to the Convention on Biological Diversity and Nepal has achieved a little till 2008 in line with CBD.
