= Marke =

Marke is the name of a number of places.

- Marke, Germany
- Marke, Belgium
- Marke, Nepal
