= Triveni Rural Municipality, Salyan =

Triveni, Salyan त्रिवेणी
- Rural municipality
- Location in Nepal
- Coordinates: 28.30°N 82.29°E
- Country: Nepal
- Province: Karnali Province
- District: Salyan District

Population (1991)
  - Total: 3,789
- Time zone: UTC+5:45 (Nepal Time)
- Website: trivenimunsalyan.gov.np

Triveni is a rural municipality in Salyan District in the Karnali Province of western-central Nepal. At the time of the 1991 Nepal census it had a population of 3789 people living in 710 individual households.

== Demographics ==
At the time of the 2011 Nepal census, Triveni Rural Municipality had a population of 16,647. Of these, 99.4% spoke Nepali, 0.3% Magar, 0.2% Urdu, 0.1% Newar and 0.1% other languages as their first language.

In terms of ethnicity/caste, 54.7% were Chhetri, 26.7% Magar, 7.8% Kami, 3.3% Sanyasi/Dasnami, 2.1% Sarki, 2.0% Damai/Dholi, 1.3% Hill Brahmin, 0.9% Newar, 0.5% Thakuri, 0.4% Musalman, 0.2% Badi, 0.1% Tharu and 0.1% others.

In terms of religion, 97.3% were Hindu, 1.8% Christian, 0.5% Buddhist and 0.4% Muslim.

In terms of literacy, 65.1% could read and write, 3.0% could only read and 31.8% could neither read nor write.
