= Dhagari Pipal =

Coordinates: 28°41′52″N 82°34′26″E

Dhagari Pipal ढागरी पिपल
- Village development committee
- Interactive map of Dhagari Pipal
- Country: Nepal
- Zone: Rapti Zone
- District: Salyan District

Population (1991)
  - Total: 3,834
- Time zone: UTC+5:45 (Nepal Time)

Dhagari Pipal is a village development committee in Salyan District in the Rapti Zone of western-central Nepal. At the time of the 1991 Nepal census it had a population of 3834 people living in 668 individual households.
