= Bajh Kanda =

Bajh Kanda बाज कांडा
- Village development committee
- Location in Nepal
- Coordinates: 28°27′0″N 82°14′30″E
- Country: Nepal
- Province: Karnali Province
- District: Salyan District

Population (1991)
  - Total: 2,241
- Time zone: UTC+5:45 (Nepal Time)

banjh Kanda is a village development committee in Salyan District in Karnali Province of western-central Nepal. At the time of the 1991 Nepal census it had a population of 2241 people living in 375 individual households.
