= Marmaparikhanda =

Coordinates: 28°34′N 82°01′E

Marmaparikanda मर्मपरिकाँडा Marma
- Village development committee
- Nickname: Ragechaur
- Interactive map of Marmaparikanda
- Country: Nepal
- Zone: Rapti Zone
- District: Salyan District

Government
  - Samajsebi: Dilli Raj Rawat

Population (1991)
  - Total: 3,530
- Time zone: UTC+5:45 (Nepal Time)

Marmaparikhanda is a village development committee in Salyan District in the Rapti Zone of western-central Nepal. At the time of the 1991 Nepal census it had a population of 3530 people living in 597 individual households.
