= Bhalchaur =

Bhalchaur भलचौर
- Village development committee
- Location in Nepal
- Coordinates: 28°30′0″N 82°33′0″E
- Country: Nepal
- Province: Karnali Province
- District: Salyan District

Government
  - समाजसेवी: नारायण दहाल

Population (1991)
  - Total: 4,671
- Time zone: UTC+5:45 (Nepal Time)

Bhalchaur is a village development committee in Salyan District in the Karnali Province of western-central Nepal. At the time of the 1991 Nepal census it had a population of 4671 people living in 883 individual households.
