= Siddheswar =

Coordinates: 28°28′N 82°12′E

Siddheswar सिद्धेश्वर
- Village development committee
- Interactive map of Siddheswar
- Country: Nepal
- Zone: Rapti Zone
- District: Salyan District

Population (1991)
  - Total: 3,715
- Time zone: UTC+5:45 (Nepal Time)

Siddheswar is a village development committee in Salyan District in the Rapti Zone of western-central Nepal. At the time of the 1991 Nepal census it had a population of 3715 people living in 604 individual households.
