= Kabhrechaur =

Kabhrechaur काभ्रेचौर
- Village development committee
- Location in Nepal
- Coordinates: 28.33°N 81.82°E
- Country: Nepal
- Zone: Rapti Zone
- District: Salyan District

Population (1991)
  - Total: 4,097
- Time zone: UTC+5:45 (Nepal Time)

Kabhrechaur is a village development committee in Salyan District in the Rapti Zone of western-central Nepal. At the time of the 1991 Nepal census, it had a population of 4097 people living in 669 individual households.
