= Sinwang =

Coordinates: 28°18′N 82°21′E

Sinwang सिनवाङ
- Village development committee
- Interactive map of Sinwang
- Country: Nepal
- Zone: Rapti Zone
- District: Salyan District

Population (1991)
  - Total: 3,012
- Time zone: UTC+5:45 (Nepal Time)

Sinwang is a village development committee in Salyan District in the Rapti Zone of western-central Nepal. At the time of the 1991 Nepal census it had a population of 3012 people living in 538 individual households.
