= Pipal Neta =

Coordinates: 28°25′N 82°18′E

Pipal Neta पिपलनेटा
- Village Development Committee
- Interactive map of Pipal Neta
- Country: Nepal
- Zone: Rapti Zone
- District: Salyan District

Population (1991)
  - Total: 1,780
- Time zone: UTC+5:45 (Nepal Time)

Pipal Neta is a village development committee in Salyan District in the Rapti Zone of western-central Nepal. At the time of the 1991 Nepal census it had a population of 1780 people living in 315 individual households.
