= Devisthal =

Coordinates: 28°32′00″N 82°02′08″E

Devasthal देवस्थल
- Village development committee
- Location in Nepal
- Country: Nepal
- Zone: Rapti Zone
- District: Salyan District

Population (1991)
  - Total: 2,940
- Time zone: UTC+5:45 (Nepal Time)

Devasthal is a village development committee in Salyan District in the Rapti Zone of western-central Nepal. At the time of the 1991 Nepal census it had a population of 2940 people living in 496 individual households.
