= Jhimpe =

Coordinates: 28°21′25″N 82°18′47″E

Jhimpe झिम्पे
- Village development committee
- Interactive map of Jhimpe
- Country: Nepal
- Zone: Rapti Zone
- District: Salyan District

Population (1991)
  - Total: 5,727
- Time zone: UTC+5:45 (Nepal Time)

Jhimpe is a village development committee in Salyan District in the Rapti Zone of western-central Nepal. At the time of the 1991 Nepal census it had a population of 5727 people living in 908 individual households.
