= Korbang Jhimpe =

Coordinates: 28°20′N 82°20′E

Korbang Jhimpe कोरबाङ झिम्पे
- Village development committee
- Interactive map of Korbang Jhimpe
- Country: Nepal
- Zone: Rapti Zone
- District: Salyan District

Population (2011)
  - Total: 6,183
- Time zone: UTC+5:45 (Nepal Time)

Korbang Jhimpe is a village development committee in Salyan District in the Rapti Zone of western-central Nepal. At the time of the 2001 Nepal census it had a population of 636. According to the 2011 Nepal census Korbang Jhimpe had a population of 6,183.
