= Syanikhal =

Syanikhal स्यानीखेल
- Location in Nepal
- Coordinates: 28.39°N 82.24°E
- Country: Nepal
- Zone: Rapti Zone
- District: Salyan District

Population (1991)
  - Total: 3,711
- Time zone: UTC+5:45 (Nepal Time)

Syanikhal is market center in Sharada Municipality in Salyan District in the Rapti Zone of western-central Nepal. The place formerly existing as Village Development Committee was annexed to form a new municipality since 18 May 2014. At the time of the 1991 Nepal census it had a population of 3711 people living in 680 individual households.
