= Bhurti Temple Complex =

Historical site in Dailekh District, Nepal

- भुर्ती देवल
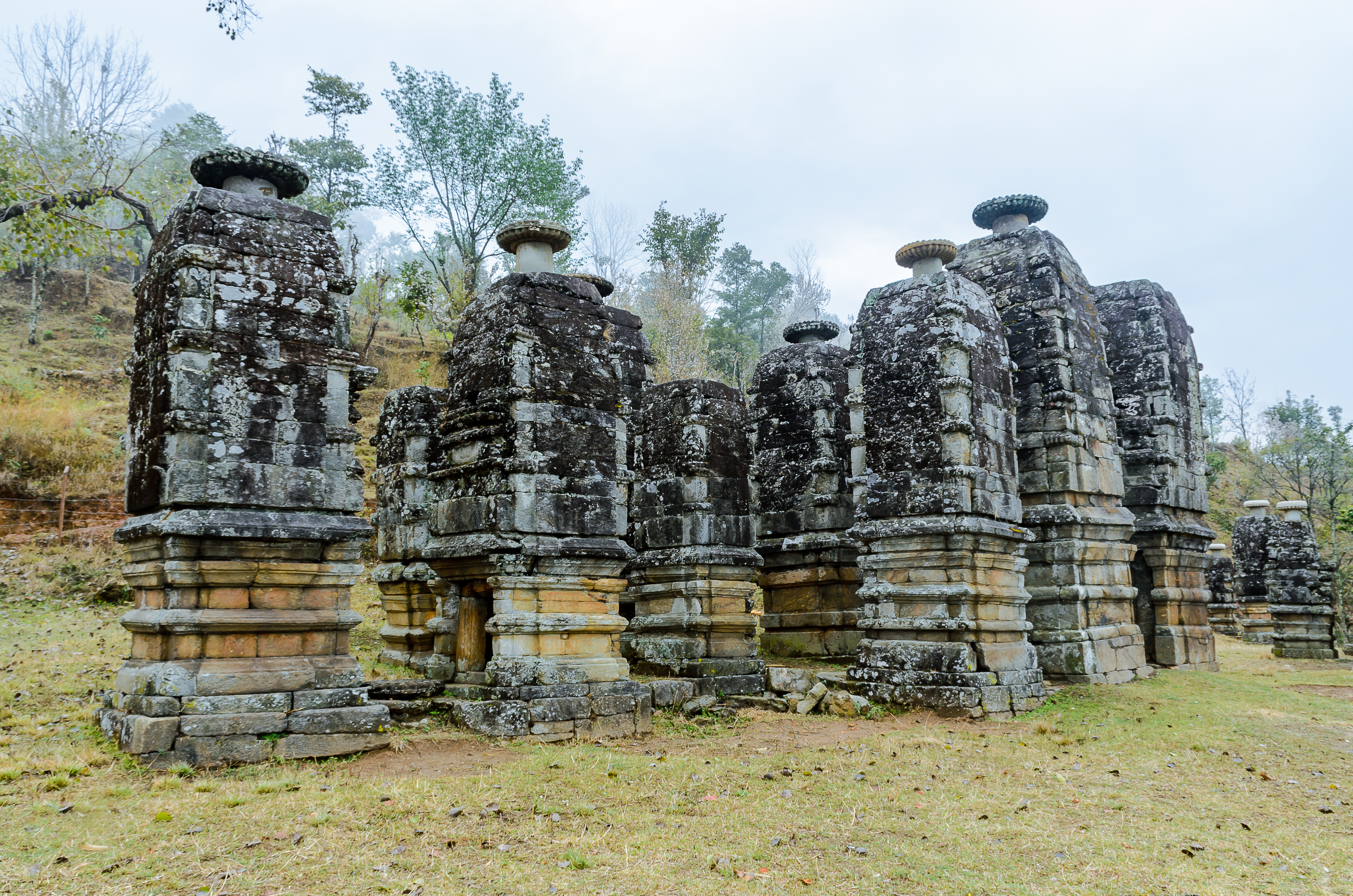

Religion
- Affiliation: Hinduism
- District: Dailekh District
- Province: Karnali Province

Location
- Country: Nepal

Bhurti Temple Complex is a ruin of ancient monuments in Dailekh district of western Nepal. The complex consists of 22 monuments. The origin of the temple complex is not known. The temple is believed to be built during Shreebarma reign in 1465 B.S., however, there is no historical evidence and details. The temples are constructed in a typical western Malla architecture with dry stone masonry in Panchadeval and Shikhar style. There are stone inscriptions around the temple complex. Currently, no worship practices is done at these temples.

According to mythology, in the Mahabharata era, when Pandava lost their nation and had to take 13 years of Banbas, they spent a year in this area.

The site is under consideration for world heritage recognition since 2008.
