= Dhakadam =

Dhakadam ढाकादम
- Village development committee
- Location in Nepal
- Coordinates: 28.55°N 82.34°E
- Country: Nepal
- Zone: Rapti Zone
- District: Salyan District

Population (1991)
  - Total: 4,655
- Time zone: UTC+5:45 (Nepal Time)

Dhakadam is a village development committee in Salyan District in the Rapti Zone of western-central Nepal. At the time of the 1991 Nepal census it had a population of 4655 people living in 831 individual households.
