= Darmakot =

Darmakot दार्माकोट
- Village development committee
- Location in Nepal
- Coordinates: 28.58°N 82.32°E
- Country: Nepal
- Zone: Rapti Zone
- District: Salyan District

Population (1991)
  - Total: 3,760
- Time zone: UTC+5:45 (Nepal Time)

Darmakot is a village development committee in Salyan District in the Rapti Zone of western-central Nepal. At the time of the 1991 Nepal census it had a population of 3760 people living in 669 individual households.
