= Bame Banghad =

Bame Banghad बामे भाङघड
- Village development committee
- Location in Nepal
- Coordinates: 28°35′0″N 82°4′0″E
- Country: Nepal
- Province: Karnali Province
- District: Salyan District

Population (1991)
  - Total: 4,331
- Time zone: UTC+5:45 (Nepal Time)

Bame Banghad is a village development committee in Salyan District in Karnali Province of western-central Nepal. At the time of the 1991 Nepal census it had a population of 4331 people living in 729 individual households.
