= Traditional fishing tackle of Central India =

Traditional fishing instruments are used by the people of Central India. Many of these are mainly made up of bamboo at Mendha and from synthetic material at Khursa. Following types of indigenous fishing instruments has been documented from both villages.

== Dhiri ==
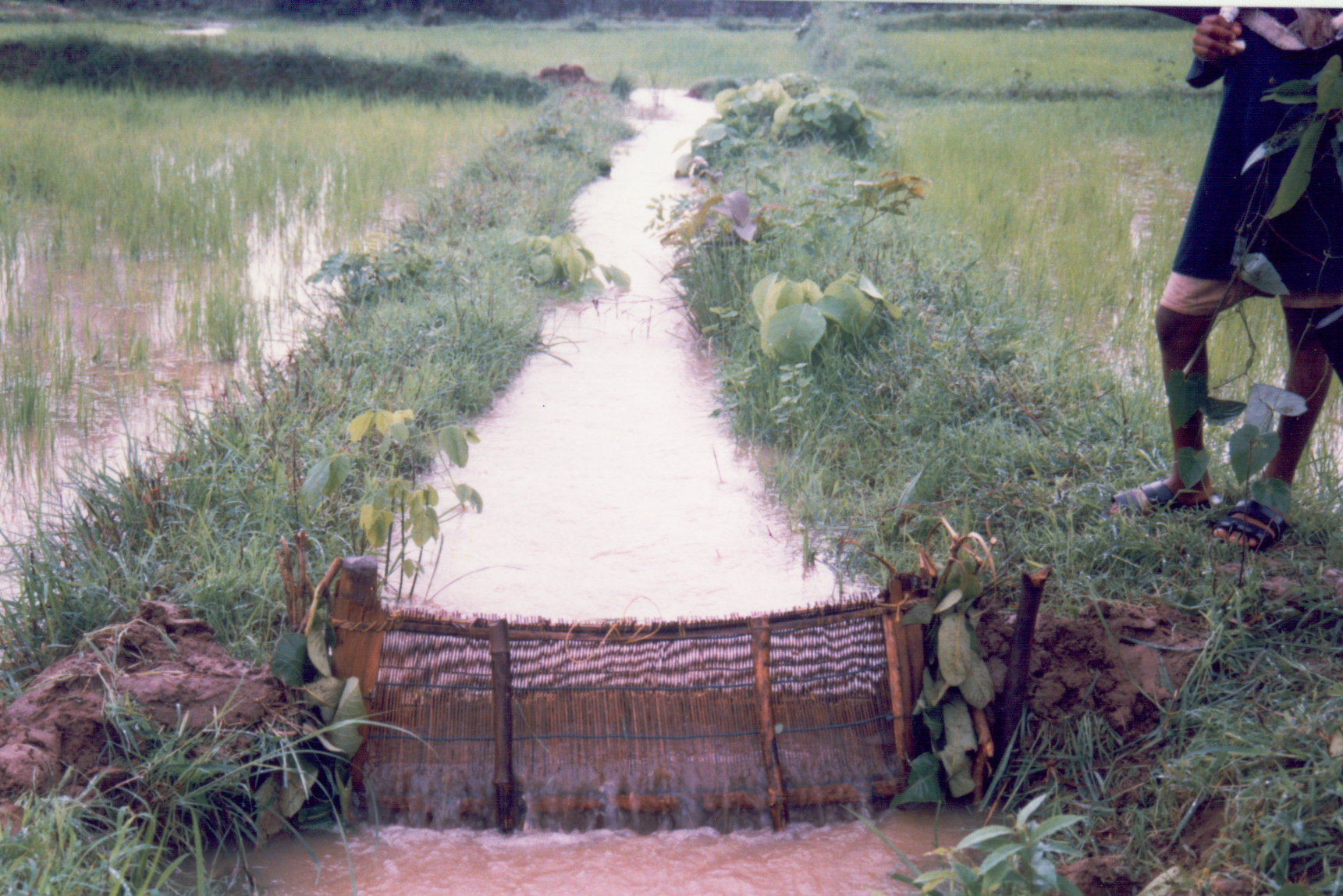
Dhiri, a traditional fishing instrument used by Gond tribal of central India

Reported from Mendha, this is a rectangular trap of bamboo sticks (locally called kaduhu) interwoven by nylon threads (originally made of fiber from the boyal tree were in use). This is a passive method of fishing. Virtually this trap operate on a 'funnel' or 'maze' principle, with fish passing easily through an entrance hole, but being confused by the blind endings within the trap and being unable to find their way out. The dimensions of box vary as per need, but standard size is 2.5 feet (0.76 m) to 5 feet (1.5 m) long, 0.5 to 1 foot (0.30 m) wide and 1 to 1.5 feet (0.46 m) high. This structure has 2 to 3 doors on both sides. The entrances or doors are very specialized structures, work as one-way valves, due to this valve fish can enter inside but cannot escape. The diameter of the doors is 2.5 cm (1 in) wide, so that fish of this much of size can only be caught. Dhiri are set in running water generally in night. The setting of the dhiri is laborious work and needs about 1 hour time. This can only set in at least 0.5 foot (0.15 m) deep water (so that water level should be slightly above the door) with the help of rope, mud and branches of the trees. Fishes moving along with stream of water enters into the doors. About 1 kg to as much as 10 kg live fish can be caught without any physical damage. Another morning or after 4 to 5 hours fish can be collected from the upper hole. Sometimes water snakes are also caught in the dhiri.(Heda, 2007)

== Kurjar ==
Reported from Mendha, this is active method of the fish trapping. Kurjar is a dome of bamboo (shaped just like a satellite antenna disc) made up of 12 bamboo sticks (locally called kurjar guta) arranged in circle and tighten to each other with the help of rope. To these sticks, nylon mesh is tightly attached (initially instead of nylon threads fiber from the boyal tree were in use). Mesh size measured 15×15 mm at lower wide end and 20×20 mm towards rear end. After assembly, circumference of the dome becomes 21.5 feet (6.6 m) and height becomes 130 cm (51 in). Its application is during monsoon flood when the shoal of migrating fishes seen by a knowledgeable individual, running from the bank into river kurjar drop on migrating fishes. Fish trapped under kurjar are collected by hand. Observation during its application reveals that it was not much effective; as it is very much time consuming compared with the low yield. To use kurjar it is important to have knowledge about the migratory behavior of the fishes.(Heda, 2007)

== Dhundka ==
Dhundka is reported from Mendha. This is very simple structure exclusively made up of bamboo. Dhundka, an earthen pot like structure has circumference of about 90 to 100 cm (39 in). One end of the pot has a rounded hole of 25 cm (10 in) diameter. This circular hole attached with a pipe made from hollow stem of gongum (Cochlospermum religiosum), gopid (Lannea coromandelica) or bamboo (Bambusa arundinacea). The gongal or gopid used as the stem of these plants has smooth, slimy inner side (so that fish readily slip inside). This can be applied in small cascades with the help of pipe attached. Fishes along with falling water enters through pipe and falls into the dhundka. Overnight, about 1 kg of fish can be caught in the dhundka.(Heda, 2007).

== Garri (hooks) ==
Garri is popular among children. This is nothing but the popular baited hooks. The stick used made up of bamboo. Earthworms and or small dead fish are used for bait.(Heda, 2007).

== Zinka ==
Reported from Mendha, this is bamboo mat as much as 15 feet (4.6 m) long and 10.5 feet (3.2 m) wide, depending upon the length of available bamboo and width of stream. It is fixed against water current so that it should immerse half in water. Flowing with water, fishes jumps on the non-immersed part of zinka and die due to asphyxia. This is generally used in the outlets of agriculture field. Very small size fishes were observed during catching.(Heda, 2007).

== Dandoor ==
Reported from Mendha, this is cylindrical structure made up of bamboo sticks. Just like dhiri it has a one-way valve. This is similar in function with dhiri. Large size fishes can be caught in the cylinder. (Heda, 2007).

== Gappa ==
Reported from Mendha, this is active method of catching fishes usually from the shallow pools. Women catch fishes with the help of this bamboo pot. This is circular pot made up of bamboo sticks. Originally, it is devised for the agriculture purpose, to collects grains etc. From a shallow pool, water is thrown outside (some time on the zinka) along with water fish thrown out and collected in a dooti (a small bamboo pot for fish collection).(Heda, 2007).

== Kotra ==
This gadget is used by Dhivar people of this area. This is a large net used in running water and after monsoon (September). This net has two parts viz. a pusa (net proper) and ghumla, a bamboo-made cylindrical structure. The net proper is made up of nylon threads. The net is 6 feet (1.8 m) long and about 2 to 3 feet (0.91 m) in circumference. One end of the pusa is attached to ghumla. Water current is confined to flow through kotra. For its application the velocity of water current should be high otherwise the fishes can return and escape. Flowing fishes trap into the kotra. (Heda, 2007).

== Koturli ==
This gadget is used by Dhivar people of this area. It is a type of the small gill net.(Heda, 2007).

== Tangad ==
This gadget is used by Dhivar people of this area. This is just like gill net with dimensions measuring 100 feet (30 m) long and 10 feet (3.0 m) wide. It is generally used to catch large size fishes in fish culture ponds.(Heda, 2007).

== Pandi ==
This gadget is used by Dhivar people of this area. It is just like gill net with dimensions measured 150 feet (46 m) long and 20 feet (6.1 m) wide. This is generally used to catch large fish.(Heda, 2007).

== Atki (gill net) ==
This is passive method of the fishing and most popular among the Dhivar and not used at all by Gond tribal. This is gill net made up of synthetic fibers. Initially the cotton fibers were in use. The length, width and mesh size is highly variable and depends on what sized fishes to be caught and habitat of its application (If the habitat depth is more large size gill net used). Weaving of the gill net is skilled work and it is an important pastime of the Dhivar people.(Heda, 2007).

== Bhor jar (cast net) ==
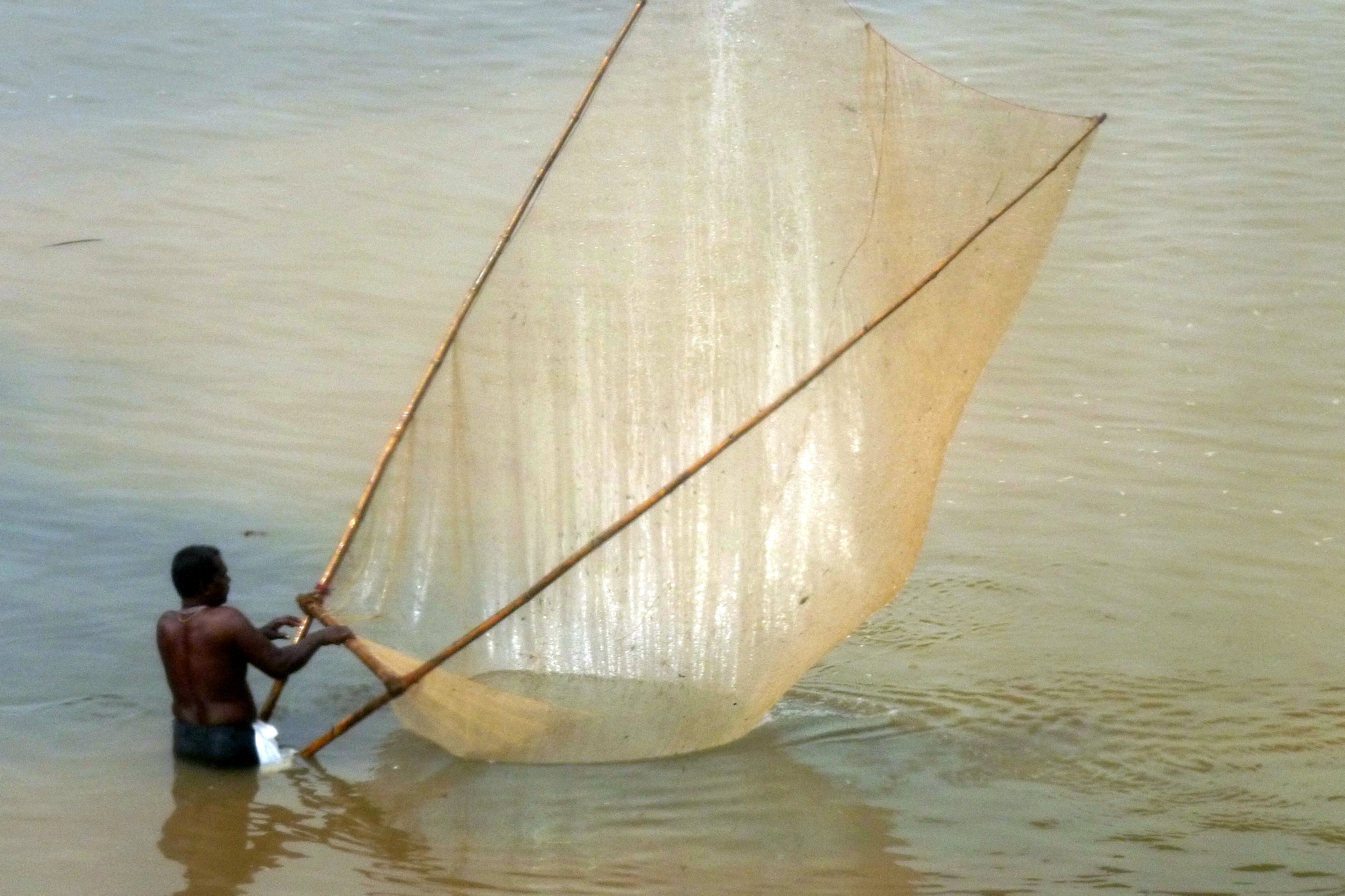
Man using a cast net

Use of the cast net is very common practice among the Dhivar fisherman but it is not found among Gond, as it needs expertise to use and it is costly. The Ghan bhor jar (small cast net) has acircumference measured 8.4 m and mesh size is 9×9 mm. (Heda, 2007).

The motha bhor jar (large cast net) is used by Dhivar people of this area.

== Joka (deep, lift net) ==
Reported from Mendha, this is a very simple bamboo made structure used to catch fishes from the small, shallow pools and ponds just like gappa. It is nothing but a deep or lift net. Two people lower this bamboo pot into water and periodically taken out of water with fish.(Heda, 2007).

== Pelni ==
This gadget is used by Dhivar people of this area. This is a triangle of the three bamboo poles to which a fine mesh is attached. It is applied against flowing water and once shoal of flowing fish enters inside, the net lifts and entered fish are collected.(Heda, 2007).

== Zoruli ==
This gadget is used by Dhivar people of this area. This is a type of lift net and used to catch small sized fishes for household consumption.(Heda, 2007).

== See also ==
- Fishing communities in Maharashtra
- Bhoi fishing community
