= Nigalchula =

Nigalchula निगलचुला
- Village development committee
- Location in Nepal
- Coordinates: 28.36°N 82.02°E
- Country: Nepal
- Province: Karnali Province
- District: Salyan District

Population (1991)
  - Total: 2,443
- Time zone: UTC+5:45 (Nepal Time)

Nigalchula is a village development committee in Salyan District in Karnali Province of western-central Nepal. At the time of the 1991 Nepal census, it had a population of 2443 people living in 418 individual households.
