= Sarpani Garpa =

Sarpani Garpa सरपानी गर्पा
- Village development committee
- Location in Nepal
- Coordinates: 28.23°N 82.39°E
- Country: Nepal
- Zone: Rapti Zone
- District: Salyan District

Population (1991)
  - Total: 3,721
- Time zone: UTC+5:45 (Nepal Time)

Sarpani Garpa is a village development committee in Salyan District in the Rapti Zone of western-central Nepal. At the time of the 1991 Nepal census it had a population of 3721 people living in 647 individual households.
