= Dandagaun, Salyan =

Coordinates: 28°25′N 82°12′E

Dandagaun, Rapti डाँडागाउँ
- Nickname: माल्नेटा Malnena
- Interactive map of Dandagaun, Rapti
- Country: Nepal
- Zone: Rapti Zone
- District: Salyan District

Population (1991)
  - Total: 4,198
- Time zone: UTC+5:45 (Nepal Time)

Dandagaun, Rapti is market center in Sharada Municipality in Salyan District in the Rapti Zone of western-central Nepal. The place formerly existing as Village Development Committee was annexed to form a new municipality since 18 May 2014. At the time of the 1991 Nepal census it had a population of 4198 people living in 740 individual households.
