= Kalagaun, Salyan =

Kalagaun कालागाउँ
- Village development committee
- Location in Nepal
- Coordinates: 28.59°N 82.23°E
- Country: Nepal
- Zone: Rapti Zone
- District: Salyan District

Population (1991)
  - Total: 5,121
- Time zone: UTC+5:45 (Nepal Time)

Kalagaun is a former village development committee in Salyan District in the Rapti Zone of western-central Nepal. At the time of the 1991 Nepal census it had a population of 5121 people living in 855 individual households.
