= Kubhinde, Salyan =

Kupinde, Rapti कुभिण्डे
- Village development committee
- Location in Nepal
- Coordinates: 28°19′34″N 82°22′42″E
- Country: Nepal
- Zone: Rapti Zone
- District: Salyan District

Population (2001)
  - Total: 5,552
- Time zone: UTC+5:45 (Nepal Time)

Kubhinde, Rapti is a village development committee in Salyan District in the Rapti Zone of western-central Nepal. At the time of the 1991 Nepal census it had a population of 4723 people living in 879 individual households.
