= Kabhra =

Kabhra काभ्रा
- Village development committee
- Location in Nepal
- Coordinates: 28.27°N 82.18°E
- Country: Nepal
- Zone: Rapti Zone
- District: Salyan District

Population (1991)
  - Total: 3,314
- Time zone: UTC+5:45 (Nepal Time)

Kabhra is a village development committee in Salyan District in the Rapti Zone of western-central Nepal. At the time of the 1991 Nepal census it had a population of 3314 people living in 607 individual households.
