= Marke, Nepal =

Marke मार्के
- Location in Nepal
- Coordinates: 28.39°N 82.09°E
- Country: Nepal
- Zone: Rapti Zone
- District: Salyan District

Population (1991)
  - Total: 4,189
- Time zone: UTC+5:45 (Nepal Time)

Marke is market center in Sharada Municipality in Salyan District in the Rapti Zone of western-central Nepal. The place formerly existing as Village Development Committee was annexed to form a new municipality since 18 May 2014. At the time of the 1991 Nepal census it had a population of 4189 people living in 770 individual households.
