= Chande, Nepal =

Coordinates: 28°27′N 82°6′E

Chande चाँदे
- Village development committee
- Interactive map of Chande
- Country: Nepal
- Zone: Rapti Zone
- District: Salyan District

Population (1991)
  - Total: 4,096
- Time zone: UTC+5:45 (Nepal Time)

Chande is a village development committee in Salyan District in the Rapti Zone of western-central Nepal. At the time of the 1991 Nepal census it had a population of 4096 people living in 620 individual households.
