= Baphukhola =

Baphukhola बाफुखोला
- Village development committee
- Location in Nepal
- Coordinates: 28°30′0″N 82°30′0″E
- Country: Nepal
- Zone: Rapti Zone
- District: Salyan District

Population (1991)
  - Total: 2,534
- Time zone: UTC+5:45 (Nepal Time)

Baphukhola is a village development committee in Salyan District in the Rapti Zone of western-central Nepal. At the time of the 1991 Nepal census it had a population of 2534 people living in 436 individual households.
