= Chhayachhetra =

Chhayachhetra छायाक्षेत्र
- Village development committee
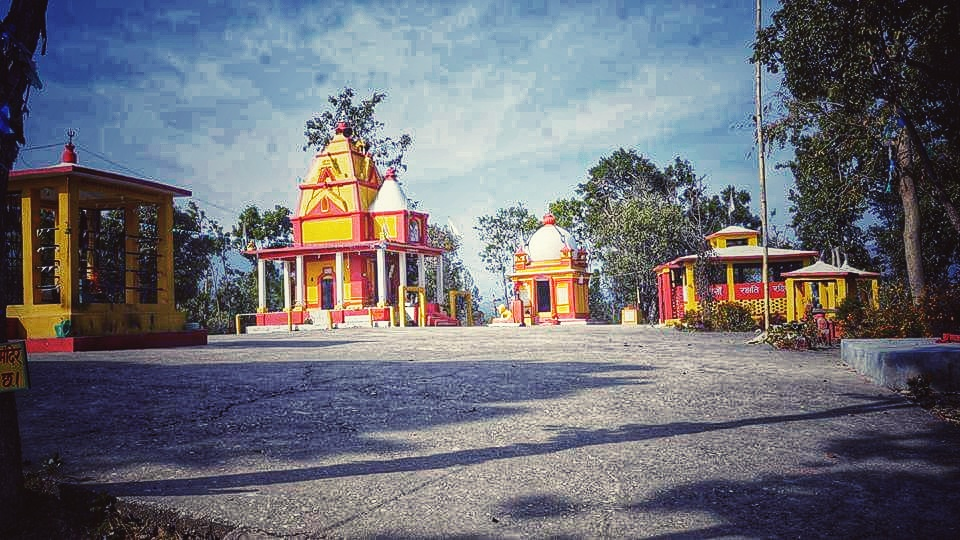
- Chhayachhetra

- Location in Nepal
- Coordinates: 28.32°N 82.22°E
- Country: Nepal
- Zone: Rapti Zone
- District: Salyan District

Population (1991)
  - Total: 5,152
- Time zone: UTC+5:45 (Nepal Time)

Chhayachhetra is a village development committee in Salyan District in the Rapti Zone of western-central Nepal. At the time of the 1991 Nepal census it had a population of 5152 people living in 888 individual households.
