= Pawan Nagar =

Coordinates: 28°12′N 82°16′E

Pawan Nagar पवन नगर
- Village Development Committee
- Interactive map of Pawan Nagar
- Country: Nepal
- Province: Lumbini Province
- District: Dang District

Population (1991)
  - Total: 11,428
- Time zone: UTC+5:45 (Nepal Time)

Pawan Nagar is a town and Village Development Committee in Dang District in Lumbini Province of south-western Nepal. At the time of the 1991 Nepal census it had a population of 11,428 persons living in 1961 individual households. Farming is the main occupation.
