= Sibaratha =

Coordinates: 28°30′N 82°19′E

Sibaratha शिवरथा
- Village development committee
- Interactive map of Sibaratha
- Country: Nepal
- Zone: Rapti Zone
- District: Salyan District

Population (1991)
  - Total: 4,372
- Time zone: UTC+5:45 (Nepal Time)

Sibaratha is a village development committee in Salyan District in the Rapti Zone of western-central Nepal. At the time of the 1991 Nepal census it had a population of 4372 people living in 749 individual households.
