= Majh Khanda =

Majh Khanda माझखण्ड
- Village development committee
- Location in Nepal
- Coordinates: 28°26′N 82°00′E
- Country: Nepal
- Zone: Rapti Zone
- District: Salyan District

Population (1991)
  - Total: 3,480
- Time zone: UTC+5:45 (Nepal Time)

Majh Khanda is a village development committee in Salyan District in the Rapti Zone of western-central Nepal. At the time of the 1991 Nepal census it had a population of 3480 people living in 648 individual households.
