= Baghmare =

Baghmare बाघमारे
- Village Development Committee
- Location in Nepal
- Coordinates: 28.21°N 82.19°E
- Country: Nepal
- Province: Lumbini Province
- District: Dang Deokhuri District

Population (1991)
  - Total: 5,965
- Time zone: UTC+5:45 (Nepal Time)

Baghmare is a town and Village Development Committee in Dang Deokhuri District in Lumbini Province of south-western Nepal. At the time of the 1991 Nepal census it had a population of 5,965 persons living in 1075 individual households.
