= Salyan District, Nepal =

District of Karnali Province,Nepal

Coordinates: 28°22′N 82°10′E

Salyan District सल्यान जिल्ला
- District
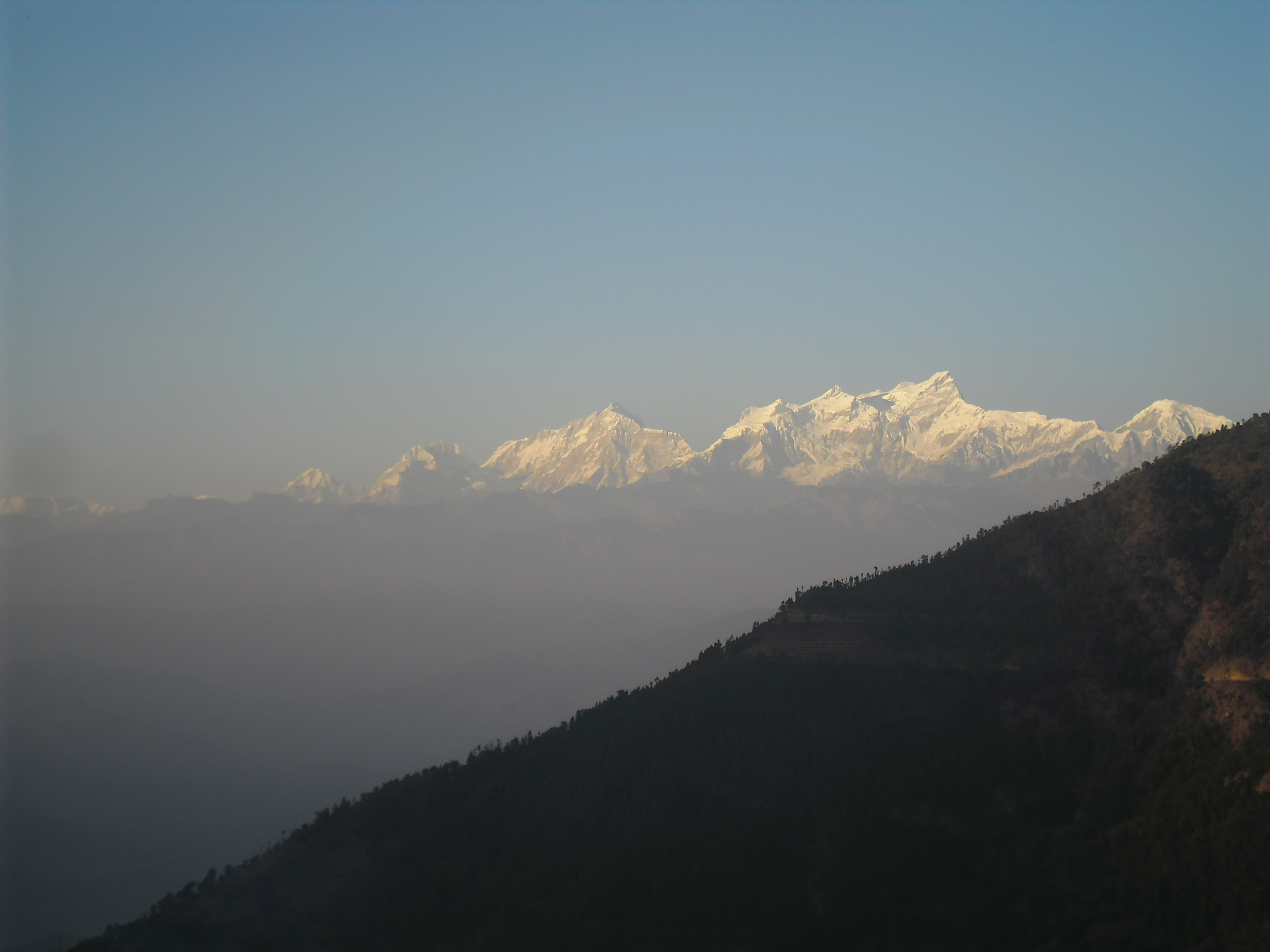
- View of the Himalayas from Chhayachhetra

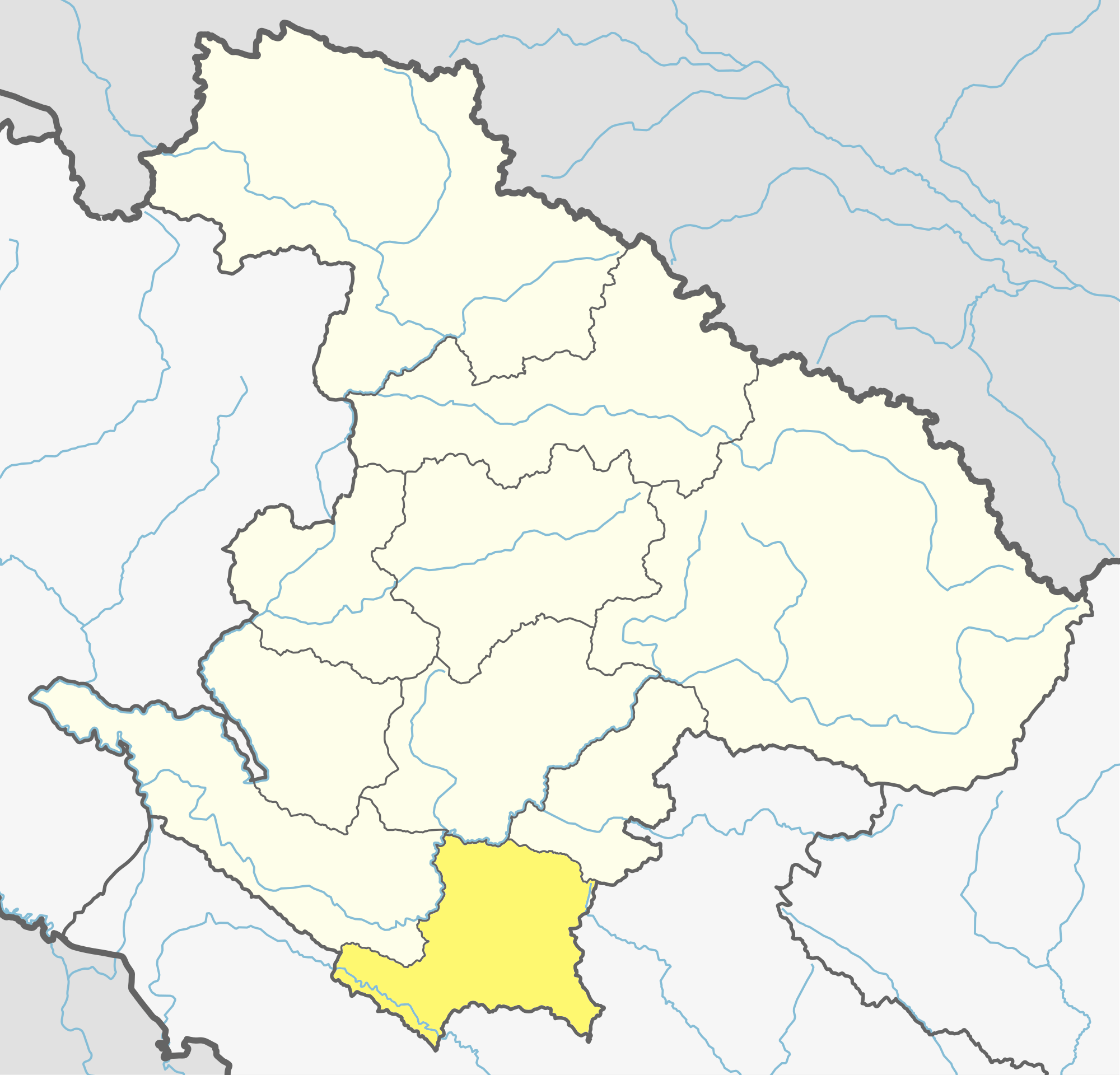
- Location of Salyan District (dark yellow) in Karnali
- Country: Nepal
- Admin HQ.: Salyan (today part of Shaarda Municipality)

Government
  - Type: Coordination committee
  - Body: DCC, Salyan

Area
  - Total: 1,462 km^{2} (564 sq mi)

Population (2011)
  - Total: 241,716
  - Density: 165.3/km^{2} (428.2/sq mi)
- Time zone: UTC+05:45 (NPT)
- Main Language(s): Nepali, English, Newari
- Website: ddcsalyan.gov.np

Salyan District (Nepali: सल्यान जिल्ला IPA: [sʌljan]) in Karnali Province, is one of the seventy-seven districts of Nepal. Salyan covers an area of 1,462 km^{2} (564 sq mi) with a population of 213,500 in 2001 and 241,716 in 2011. The district's administrative center is named Salyan or Salyan Khalanga, today it is part of Shaarada Municipality.

The district is known for its Hindu temples including Shiva temples in Chhayachhetra and Laxmipur, and the Devi temple at Khairabang in Shaarada municipality, one of nine in Nepal.

== History ==
Salyan was one of the Baise Rajya, a confederation of 22 petty kingdoms in the Karnali (Ghagra) region. It was ruled by Samala Shahis before unification. About 1760 CE all these kingdoms were annexed by the Shah Dynasty during the unification of Nepal.

== Etymology ==
Salyan derives from the Nepali word sallo which means pine tree or conifer.

== Geography and climate ==
Although Salyan is considered a hilly district, its southwest salient is actually outside the Pahari-inhabited hill region, in the lower Siwalik Hills that are more an extension of the Terai.

The Babai River flows through the southwestern Siwaliks section after draining Dang Valley. A tributary Sharad Khola drains the eastern half of Salyan's hill region—including the district center, then exits these hills by cutting through the Mahabharat Range to its confluence with the Babai. The western half of Salyan's hill region is drained by the Bheri.

| Climate zone | Elevation range | % of area |
|---|---|---|
| Upper tropical | 300 to 1,000 meters 1,000 to 3,300 ft. | 28.6% |
| Subtropical | 1,000 to 2,000 meters 3,300 to 6,600 ft. | 68.3% |
| Temperate | 2,000 to 3,000 meters 6,400 to 9,800 ft. | 3.0% |

== Demographics ==
At the time of the 2021 Nepal census, Salyan District had a population of 238,515. 9.68% of the population is under 5 years of age. It has a literacy rate of 77.30% and a sex ratio of 1074 females per 1000 males. 101,624 (42.61%) lived in municipalities.

Castes/ethnic groups in Salyan district (2021)
1. Chhetri (59.0%)
2. Magar (14.6%)
3. Kami (11.2%)
4. Thakuri (3.34%)
5. Dasnami (3.15%)
6. Damai (2.72%)
7. Bahun (2.14%)
8. Sarki (1.88%)
9. Others (2.00%)

Khas people make up a majority of the population with 84% of the population. Chhetris form an outright majority in the district with 59% of the population, while Khas Dalits make up 16% of the population. Magars make up 15% of the population.

Languages of Salyan district (2021)
1. Nepali (98.3%)
2. Magar Kham (1.02%)
3. Others (0.72%)

At the time of the 2021 census, 98.26% of the population spoke Nepali and 1.02% Magar Kham as their first language. In 2011, 99.4% of the population spoke Nepali as their first language.

Religion in Salyan District (2021)
| Religion | Percent |
| Hinduism | 95.89% |
| Christianity | 2.72% |
| Buddhism | 1.10% |
| Other or not stated | 0.29% |

=== Population by census 1971–2021 ===
Source:

== Administration ==
The district consists of ten municipalities, out of which three are urban municipalities and seven are rural municipalities:

- Shaarda Municipality
- Bagchaur Municipality
- Bangad Kupinde Municipality
- Kalimati Rural Municipality
- Tribeni Rural Municipality
- Kapurkot Rural Municipality
- Chhatreshwari Rural Municipality
- Kumakh Rural Municipality
- Siddha Kumakh Rural Municipality
- Darma Rural Municipality

=== Former village development committees ===
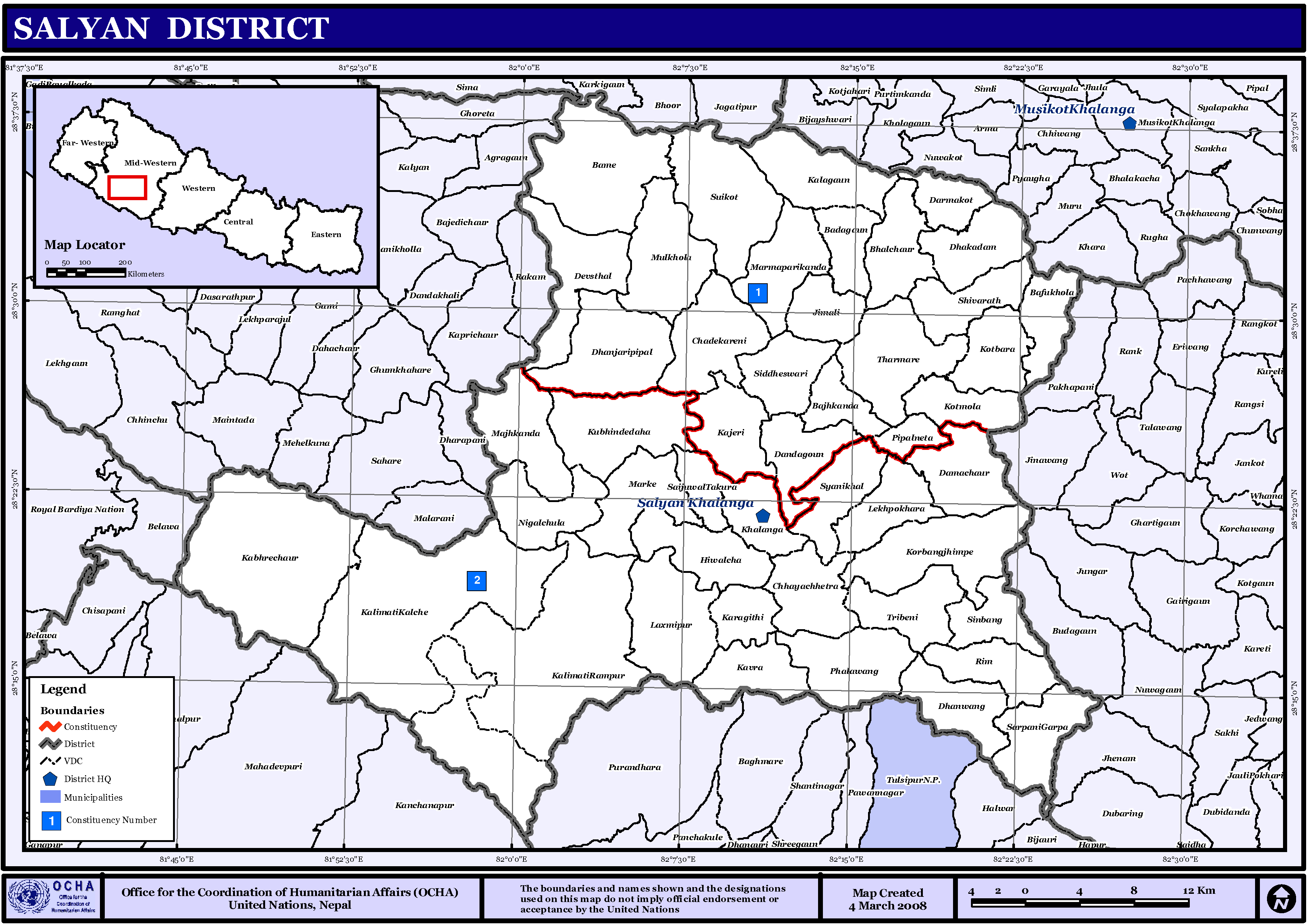
VDCs in Salyan

Prior to the restructuring of the district, Saylan District consisted of the following municipalities and village development committees:

- Badagaun
- Bafukhola
- Bajh Kanda
- Bame Banghad
- Bhalchaur
- Chande
- Chhayachhetra
- Damachaur
- Dandagaun
- Darmakot
- Devasthal
- Jhajhari Pipal
- Dhakadam
- Dhanwang
- Hiwalcha
- Jhimpe
- Jimali
- Kabhrechaur
- Kajeri
- Kalagaun
- Kalimati Kalche
- Kalimati Rampur
- Kavra
- Khalanga
- Korbang Jhimpe
- Kotbara
- Kotmala
- Kubhinde
- Laxmipur
- Lekhpokhara
- Majh Khanda
- Marke
- Marmaparikanda
- Mulkhola
- Nigalchula
- Phalawang
- PipalNeta
- Rim
- Saijuwal Takura
- Sarpani Garpa
- Sibaratha
- Siddheswar
- Sinwang
- Suikot
- Syanikhal
- Tharmare
- Tribeni
  - Halde Now kalimati Rular muncipatity 2

== Maps ==
Besides the United Nations/Nepal map of districts and VDCs shown above, their Map Centre has a downloadable PDF version adding municipalities, roads and water detail:

"Salyan District" (PDF) (Map). Salyan District.

From 1992 to 2002 a definitive series of large scale topographic maps were surveyed and published through a joint project by Government of Nepal Survey Department and Finland's Ministry for Foreign Affairs contracting through the FinnMap consulting firm. Japan International Cooperation Agency substituted for FinnMap in Lumbini Zone. Topographic sheets at 1:25,000 scale covering 7.5 minutes latitude and longitude map the Terai and Middle Mountains. Less populated high mountain regions are on 15 minute sheets at 1:50,000. JPG scans can be downloaded here: These sheets cover Salyan District:

- 2881 08D Bajedichaur (1999)
- 2881 11D Chisapani Mulatati (1997)
- 2881 12A Mehelkuna (1999)
- 2881 12B Botechaur (1999)
- 2881 12C Ghuiyabari (1998)
- 2881 12D Baluwa (1998)
- 2881 16A Dhakeri (1997)
- 2881 16B Dhobaghat (1997)
- 2882 05A Karkigau (1999)
- 2882 05C Salli Bajar (1999)
- 2882 05D Swikot (1999)
- 2882 06C Pharulachaur (1999)
- 2882 06D Simruth (1999)
- 2882 09A Kubhinde Daha (1999)
- 2882 09B Khalanga (1999)
- 2882 09C Suketal (1999)
- 2882 09D Shitalpati (1998)
- 2882 10A Tharmare (1999)
- 2882 10B Sukhaodar (1999)
- 2882 10C Luham (1998)
- 2882 10D Nerpa (1999)
- 2882 13A Hamsapur (1998)
- 2882 13B Panchakule (1998)
- 2882 14A Tulsipur (1999)
- 2882 14B Dubrin (1999)
