= Sarki (caste) =

Sarki also indigenous ethnic group of Nepal, occupational caste

सार्की

Regions with significant populations
- Himalayas; Nepal (India) Darjeeling, Kalimpong, Dooars; Bhutan; Burma
- Nepal: 452,229 (1.5% of Nepal's population)

Languages
- Nepali, Thakali some also speak Gurung

Religion
- Shamanism, Buddhism 1.7% (2011), Hinduism 95.46% (2011), Christianity 2.84% (2011)

Related ethnic groups
- indigenous people, Damai, Badi, Kami, Gandarbha/Gaine

Sarki (Nepali: सार्की) are an indigenous people in Nepal. They are found in the region of the Himalayas, Nepal, across the hills of Darjeeling & Kalimpong and in Terai area of Dooars.

Traditionally Sarki men wear bhoto, kachada, dhakatopi, ascot, while women wear cholo, fariya, and potuka. Now, due to the influence of Western culture, various types of dresses have also been introduced. Now, they wear modern clothes. They are experts in playing their musical instrument "Madal" and performing dance in a group which is also called “Khayali Marooni”. They also have other dance like Thali nach, Sarange nach. According to the 2021 Nepal census, Sarki makes up 1.55% of Nepal's population (452,229 people). Sarki are referred to in the Nepali and Thakali languages.

Due to many caste-based discriminations in Nepal, the government of Nepal legally abolished the caste system and criminalized any caste-based discrimination, including "untouchability" (the ostracism of a specific caste) - in the year 1963 A.D. With Nepal's step towards freedom and equality, Nepal, previously ruled by a Hindu monarchy, was a Hindu nation which has now become a secular state, and on 28 May 2008, it was declared a republic, ending it as a Hindu kingdom

The 1854 Nepalese Muluki Ain (Legal Code) categorized Sarki as a category. Sarki is categorized under "Hill Dalit" among the 9 broad social groups, along with Damai, Badi, Kami and Gaine by the Government of Nepal.

== Geographic distribution ==
At the time of the 2011 Nepal census, 374,816 people (1.4% of the population of Nepal) were Sarki. The frequency of Sarki by province was as follows:

- Gandaki Province (4.1%)
- Karnali Province (2.6%)
- Sudurpashchim Province (1.7%)
- Lumbini Province (1.5%)
- Bagmati Province (1.3%)
- Koshi Province (1.0%)
- Madhesh Province (0.1%)

The frequency of Sarki was higher than national average (1.4%) in the following districts:

- Gorkha (7.6%)
- Jumla (7.1%)
- Parbat (6.7%)
- Arghakhanchi (6.1%)
- Baglung (5.6%)
- Lamjung (5.3%)
- Bajura (5.0%)
- Dhading (4.8%)
- Gulmi (4.8%)
- Dadeldhura (4.5%)
- Tanahun (4.3%)
- Pyuthan (4.2%)
- Syangja (4.0%)
- Sindhuli (3.6%)
- Myagdi (3.4%)
- Kalikot (3.2%)
- Palpa (3.2%)
- Dailekh (3.1%)
- Ramechhap (3.1%)
- Okhaldhunga (2.9%)
- Dolpa (2.8%)
- Khotang (2.8%)
- Udayapur (2.6%)
- Kaski (2.5%)
- Doti(2.4%)
- Surkhet (2.4%)
- Bhojpur (2.3%)
- Humla (2.3%)
- Bajhang (2.2%)
- Dang (1.9%)
- Kavrepalanchok (1.9%)
- Jajarkot (1.8%)
- Salyan (1.8%)
- Western Rukum (1.8%)
- Nuwakot (1.7%)
- Kanchanpur (1.6%)
- Terhathum (1.6%)
- Sindhupalchowk (1.5%)

== Bibliography ==
- Whelpton, John (2005). A History of Nepal. Cambridge University Press. ISBN 978-0521804707.
