= Karnali Province =

Province of Nepal

Karnali Province कर्णाली प्रदेश
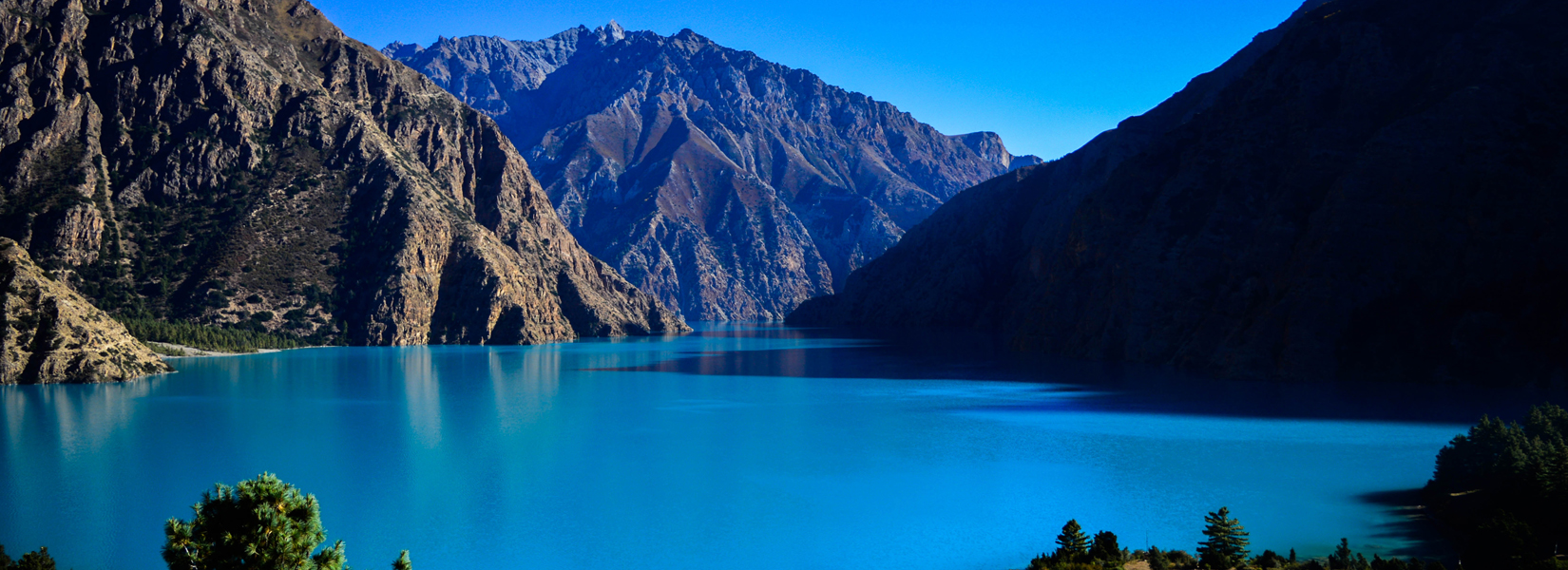
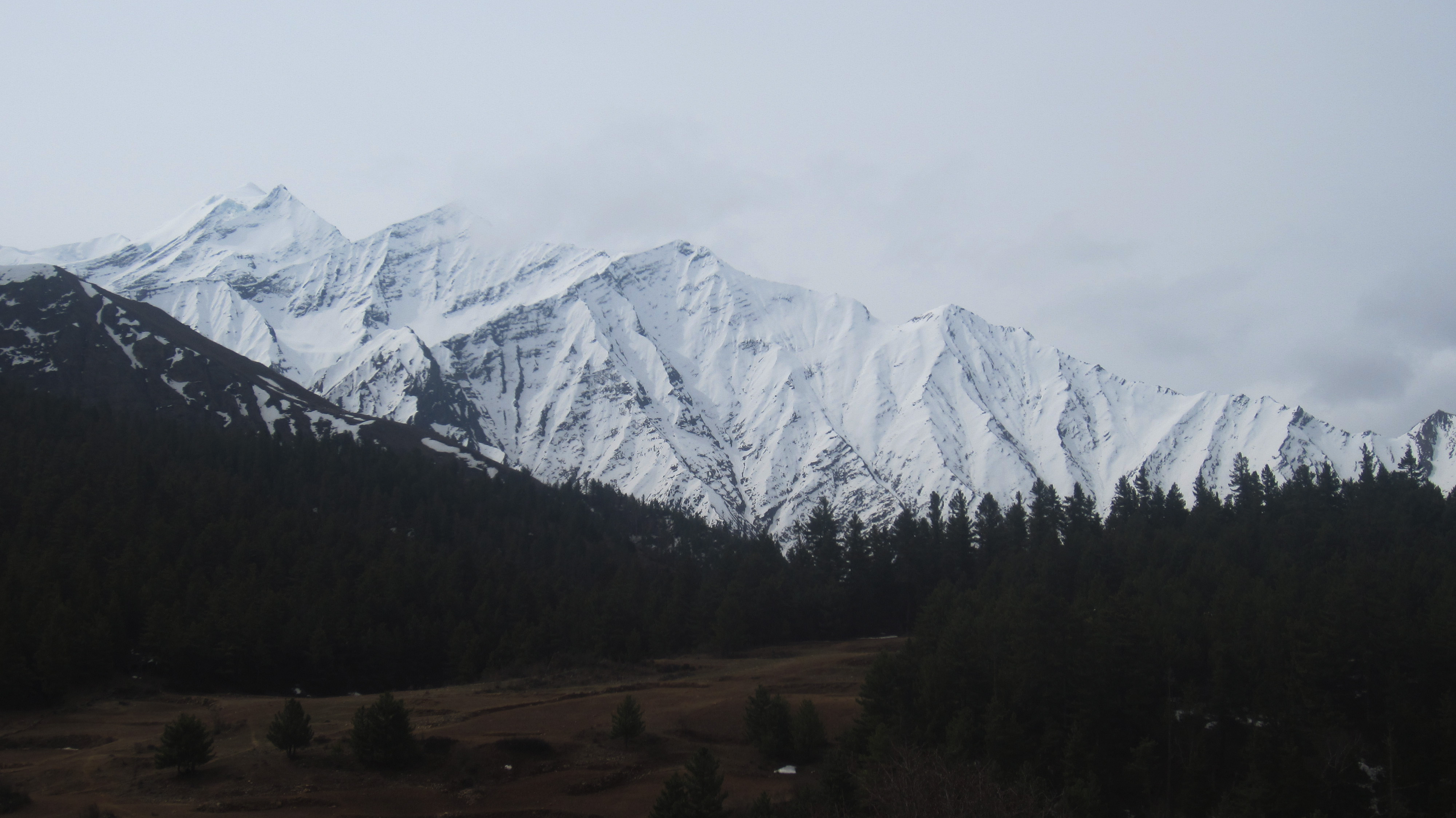
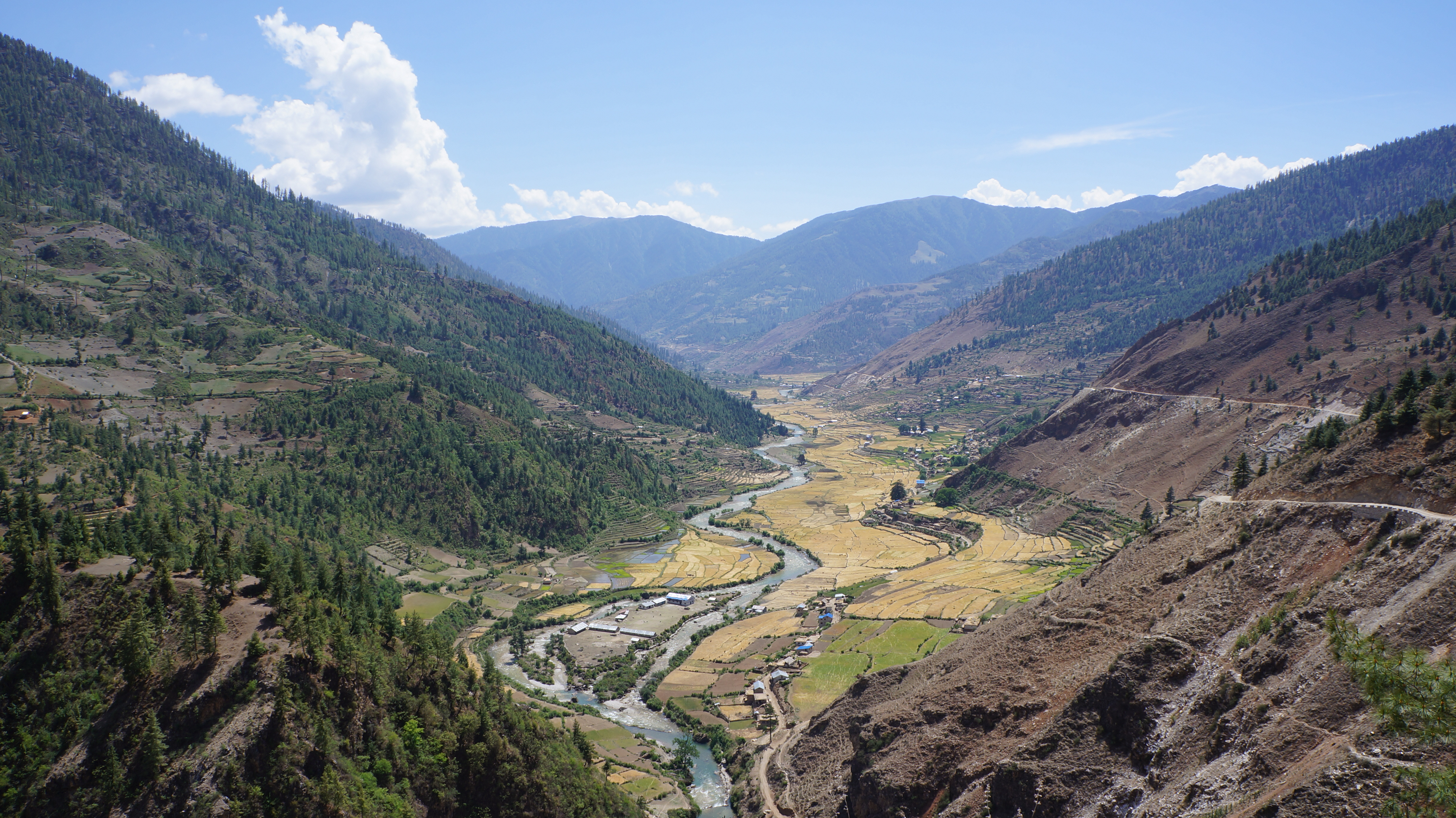
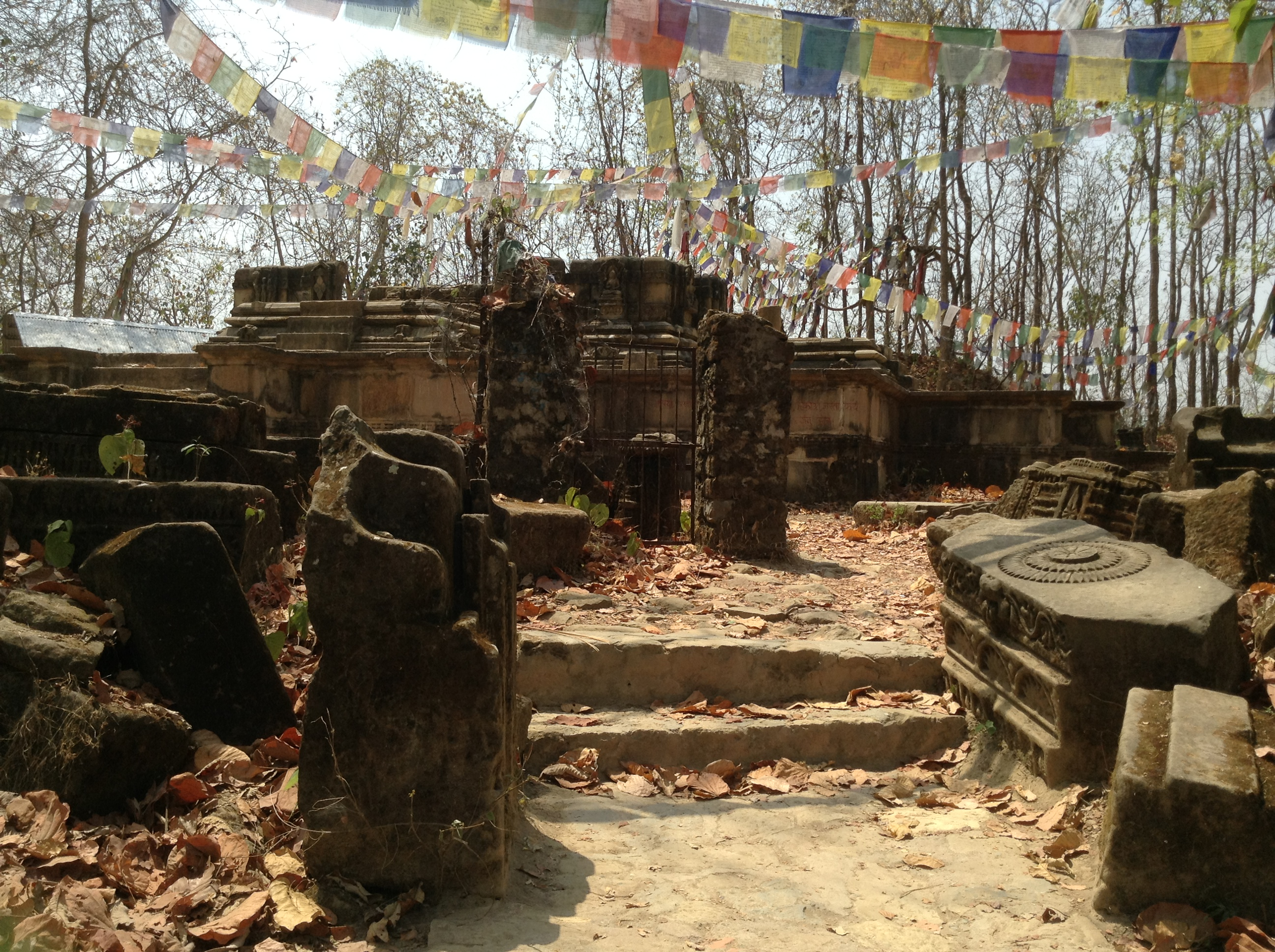
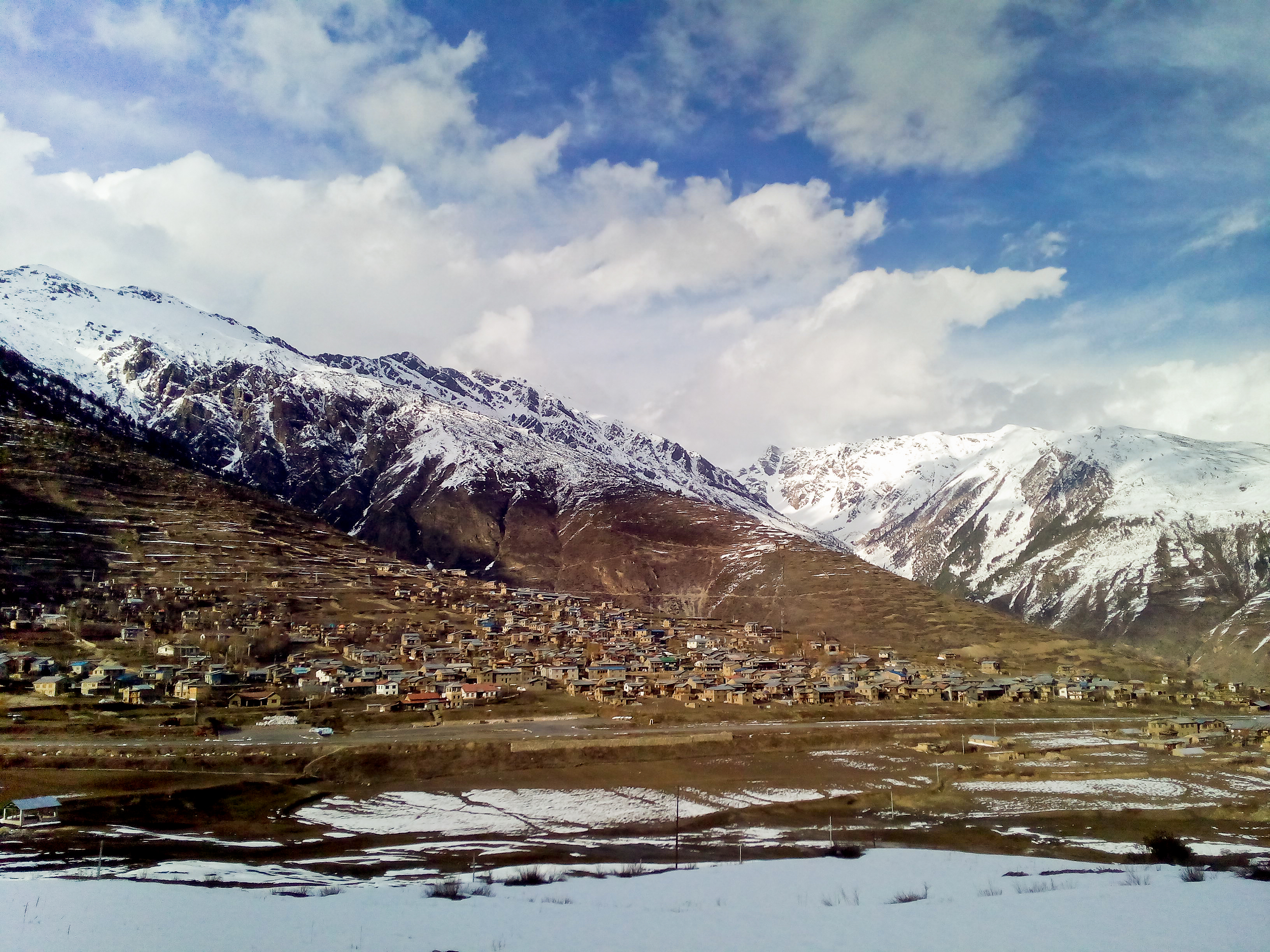
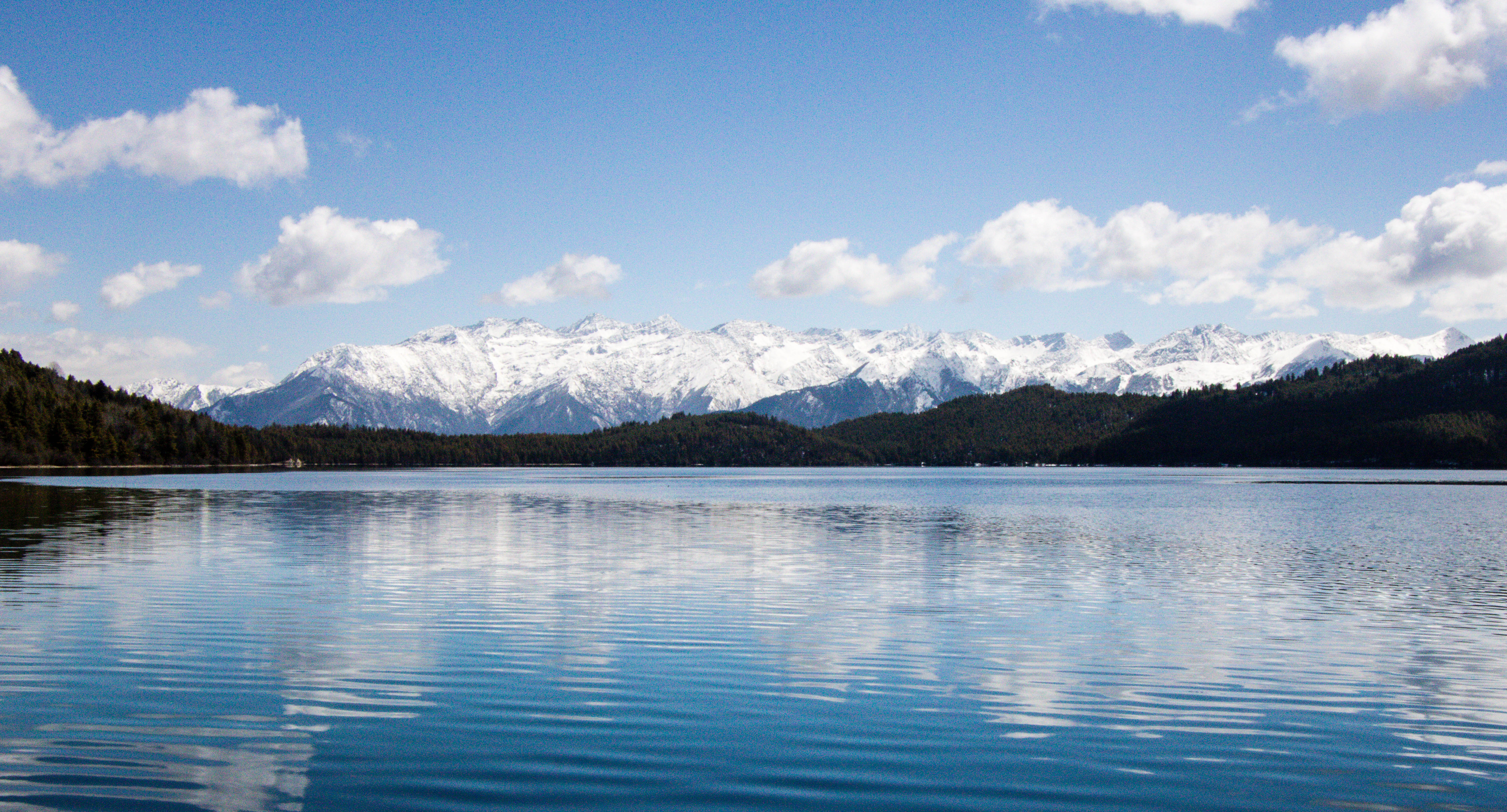
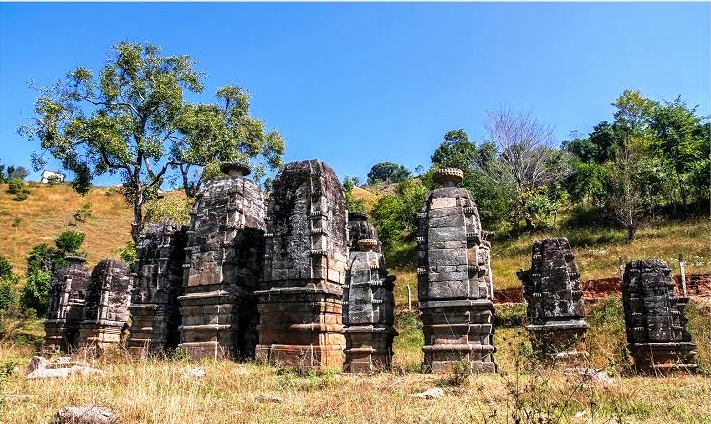
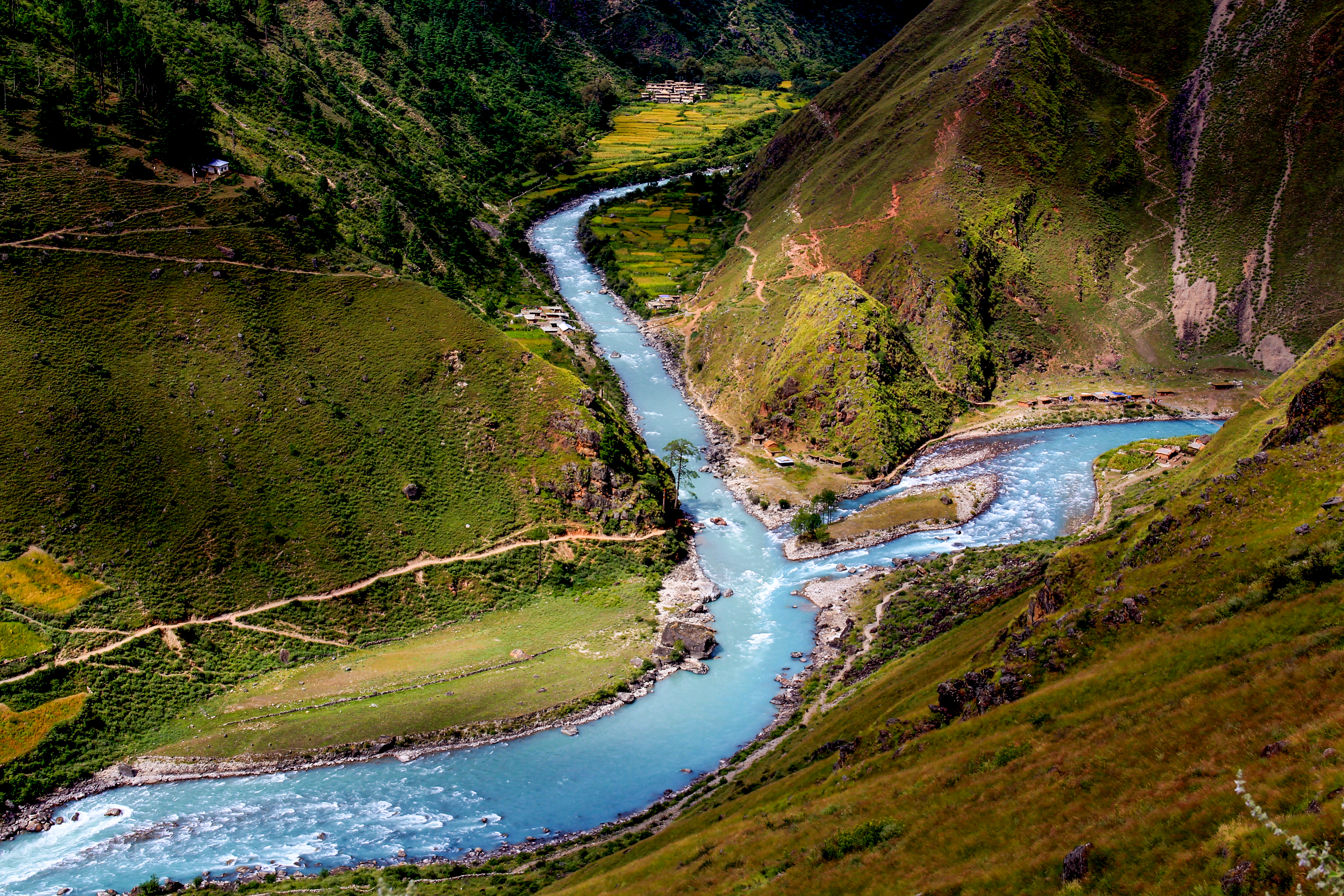
- From top going clockwise:Phoksundo lake, Kanjiroba, Sinja Valley, ruins of Kakre Bihar in Surkhet, Simikot, Rara lake, Bhurti Temple Complex and Karnali River

- Seal

- Location of Karnali Province

- Divisions of Karnali Province
- Interactive map of Karnali Province
- Coordinates: 29.27°N 82.18°E
- Country: Nepal
- Formation: 20 September 2015
- Named as Karnali: 25 February 2018
- Named for: Karnali River
- Capital: Birendranagar
- Largest city: Birendranagar
- Districts: 10

Government
  - Type: Province
  - Body: Government of Karnali Province
  - Governor: Yagya Raj Joshi
  - Chief Minister: Mangal Bahadur Shahi
  - High Court: Surkhet High Court
  - Provincial Assembly: Unicameral (40 seats)
  - Parliamentary constituency: Pratinidhi Sabha 12; Rastriya Sabha 8

Area
  - Total: 27,984 km^{2} (10,805 sq mi)
  - Rank: 1st
- Highest elevation (Churen Himal): 7,348 m (24,108 ft)
- Lowest elevation (Kuine): 180 m (590 ft)

Population (2021)
  - Total: 1,688,412
  - Rank: 7th
  - Density: 60.335/km^{2} (156.27/sq mi)
  - Rank: 7th
- Demonym: Madhya Pashchimeli Nepali
- Time zone: UTC+5:45 (NST)
- Geocode: NP-SI
- ISO 3166 code: NP-P6
- Official Language: Nepali
- Other Official Languages: 1.Jumli; 2.Magar
- HDI (2022): 0.575 ▲ (medium)
- HDI rank: 7th
- Literacy: ▲76.6%(2024)
- Sex ratio: 95.78 ♂ /100 ♀ (2011)
- GDP: US$2.1 billion
- GDP rank: 7th
- Website: www.karnali.gov.np

Karnali Province (Nepali: कर्णाली प्रदेश, romanized: Karṇālī pradēśa) is one of the seven federal provinces of Nepal formed by the new constitution, which was adopted on 20 September 2015. The total area of the province is 27,984 square kilometres (10,805 mi^{2}), making it the largest province in Nepal with 18.97% of the country's area. According to the 2011 Nepal census, the population of the province was 1,570,418, making it the least populous province in Nepal. The province borders the Tibet Autonomous Region of China to the north, Gandaki Province to the east, Sudurpashchim Province to the west, and Lumbini Province to the south. Birendranagar with a population of 154,886 is both the province's capital and largest city.

== Etymology ==
The province's name is derived from the Karnali River, which flows through the province. A meeting of the provincial assembly on 25 February 2018 adopted the name Karnali for the province.

== History ==
Karnali is an old civilization connected with the Karnali River Archaeological sites found in Jumla, Surkhet and Dailekh infer that the area was part of the old Khasa kingdom, established during the 11th century. The capital of the Khas Kingdom was Sinja in present-day Jumla district. The kingdom expanded to a great extent in the 13th and 14th century; expanding to Garhwal in the west, Mansarowar and Guge regions of Tibet in the north, Gorkha-Nuwakot regions in the east and Kapilvastu with large areas of Terai in the south. After the late 14th century, the Khas empire collapsed and was divided into the Baise Rajya (22 principalities) in Karnali-Bheri region.

Before the unification of modern Nepal, a part of Karnali (from Karnali River to Bheri River) was in the Sanghiya Baise Rajya (22 principality confederacy). The principalities were sovereign but intermittently allied among themselves until they were annexed during the unification of modern Nepal from 1744 to 1810.

== Geography ==
Karnali is the largest province of Nepal with an area of 27,984 km^{2} (10,805 sq mi). The province is surrounded by Gandaki Province in east, Lumbini Province in south-east and south, Sudurpashchim Province in the west and Tibet Autonomous Region of China in north.

The province has occupied higher mountains land of north and mid-hills of Nepal. It contains Kubi Gangri, Changla and Kanjiroba mountains in north. The Shey Phoksundo National Park with Phoksundo lake is the largest national park of Nepal and Rara lake is the largest lake of Nepal which are located in Karnali Province. Karnali River is the biggest river of the province which is thought to be the longest river in Nepal. Seti River and Bheri River are tributaries of Karnali, and Kupinde Daha is a lake of Karnali.

Average temperatures and precipitation for selected communities in Karnali
Location	August (°F)	August (°C)	January (°F)	January (°C)	Annual Precipitation (mm/in)
Kharpunath	48	8.9	9.5	−12.5	209.5/8.2
Simikot	54.9	12.7	17.6	−8	304.2/12
Chandannath	60.8	16	29.7	−1.3	728.9/28.7
Narayan	71.8	22.1	45.3	7.4	1252.3/49.3
Birendranagar	78.4	25.8	53.2	11.8	1651/65

== Demographics ==
According to the 2021 Census of Nepal, Karnali Province has a population of 1,688,412 comprising 864,651 females and 823,761 males. The province has the lowest population in the country, having 5.93% of the population on 19.74% of the land. The population density of the province is 56 people per square kilometer. 10.00% of the population is under 5 years of age. It has a literacy rate of 76.08%.

=== Ethnic groups ===
Castes/ethnicities in Karnali province (2021)
1. Chhetri (42.2%)
2. Kami (16.2%)
3. Thakuri (10.5%)
4. Magar (10.4%)
5. Hill Brahmin (8.03%)
6. Damai (4.05%)
7. Sarki (2.84%)
8. Sanyasi (1.30%)
9. Other Hill Janjati (2.86%)
10. Others (1.61%)

Khas people are the largest ethnic group, making up 85% of the population, with Chhetris as the largest subgroup. Khas Dalits account for 23% of the population within the Khas group, with the Kami being the largest Dalit subgroup. Hill Janjatis make up 13% of the population, most of whom are Magars. Small numbers of Tibetic groups also live in the province.

=== Languages ===
Languages of Karnali Province (2021)
1. Nepali (88.8%)
2. Khash (6.34%)
3. Magar (1.60%)
4. Others (3.21%)

Of the population, 88.85% of the population spoke Nepali, 6.34% Khash and 1.60% Magar as their first language. The dialect of Nepali spoken most in the province is variously known as Khash or by local names.

The Language Commission of Nepal has recommended Magar as an additional official language in the province. The most spoken language is Nepali, which is known with its original name Khas Kura in the province.

=== Religion ===
Religion in Karnali Province (2021)
1. Hindu (94.7%)
2. Buddhism (3.16%)
3. Christianity (1.74%)
4. Other or not stated (0.43%)

Hinduism is the most followed religion in the province with 95.34% of the people identifying as Hindus. Buddhism is the largest minority religion, being followed by 3.09%, and Christianity is the second-largest minority religion, being followed by 1.30% of the population.

== Government and administration ==
The Governor acts as the head of the province while the Chief Minister is the head of the provincial government. The Chief Judge of the Surkhet High Court is the head of the judiciary. The present Governor, Chief Minister and Chief Judge are Govindra Prasad Kaulani, Jeevan Bahadur Shahi and Hari Kumar Pokharel respectively. The province has 40 provincial assembly constituencies, 12 House of Representative constituencies and eight National Assembly seats.

Karnali has a unicameral legislature, like all of the other provinces in Nepal. The term length of the provincial assembly is five years. The Provincial Assembly of Karnali Province is temporarily housed at the Irrigation Division Office in Birendranagar.

=== Administrative subdivisions ===
Karnali is divided into ten districts.

Districts	Headquarters	Population (2011)
Western Rukum District	Musikot	155,383
Salyan District	Salyan	242,444
Dolpa District	Dunai	36,700
Humla District	Simikot	50,858
Jumla District	Chandannath	108,921
Kalikot District	Manma	136,948
Mugu District	Gamgadhi	55,286
Surkhet District	Birendranagar	350,804
Dailekh District	Narayan	261,770
Jajarkot District	Khalanga	171,304

A district is administered by the head of the District Coordination Committee and the District Administration Officer. The districts are further dived to municipalities or rural municipalities which are further divided into wards. There are 25 municipalities and 54 rural municipalities in the province. The capital and largest city of the province is Birendranagar. It is only city in the province with a population of over 50,000.

Largest cities or towns in Karnali Province Central Bureau of Statistics
Rank		District	Pop.
1	Birendranagar	Surkhet	100,458
2	Gurbhakot	Surkhet	43,765
3	Dullu	Dailekh	41,540
4	Bheriganga	Surkhet	41,407
5	Bangad Kupinde	Salyan	36,052
6	Chhedagad	Jajarkot	35,295
7	Bagchaur	Salyan	34,118
8	Shaarada	Salyan	33,730
9	Aathbiskot	Rukum West	33,601
10	Bheri	Jajarkot	33,515

== Economy ==
Karnali Province has the lowest growth rate in the country with an annual economic growth rate of 5.7% and is also contributes the least to the GDP at 4.1%. The province is among the poorest in Nepal with an estimated 28.9% of people living under absolute poverty (second highest in the country) and 51.7% of the people are multidimensionally poor (highest in the country). The unemployment rate in the province stands at 9.7% which is the third-lowest in the country.

=== Agriculture ===
Karnali is the largest producer of barley in the country and accounted for 43% of the country's total share of barley production in 2018/19.

== Environment ==
It is estimated in 2023, or the year 2078 in Nepal, that more than 96 percent or 1,644,022 of the citizens of Karnali province are forced to drink contaminated water, and only 3 percent or 50,847 of citizens in the province have access to clean drinking water, according to Nepalnews.

== See also ==
- Provinces of Nepal
- List of districts in Nepal
