= Naumule =

Naumule नौमुले
- Rural municipality
- Location in Nepal
- Coordinates: 28.91°N 81.83°E
- Country: Nepal
- Province: Karnali
- District: Dailekh
- Wards: 8
- Established: 10 March 2017

Government
  - Type: Rural council
  - Chairperson: Mr. Bhade Budha Magar (NC)
  - Vice-chairperson: Mrs. Amrita Singh (NC)

Area
  - Total: 228.59 km^{2} (88.26 sq mi)

Population (2011)
  - Total: 20,802
  - Density: 91.001/km^{2} (235.69/sq mi)
- Time zone: UTC+5:45 (NST)
- Website: official website

Naumule (Nepali: नौमुले) is a rural municipality located in Dailekh District of Karnali Province of Nepal.

Naumule, Toli, Baluwatar Dwari, Kalika, Salleri and Chauratha which previously were all separate Village development committees merged to form this new local level body. Fulfilling the requirement of the new Constitution of Nepal 2015, Ministry of Federal Affairs and General Administration replaced all old VDCs and Municipalities into 753 new local level bodies.

The total area of the rural municipality is 228.59 square kilometres (88.26 sq mi) and the total population of the rural municipality as of 2011 Nepal census is 20,802 individuals. The rural municipality is divided into total 8 wards. The headquarters of the municipality is situated at Naumule.

== Demographics ==
At the time of the 2011 Nepal census, Naumule Rural Municipality had a population of 20,802. Of these, 92.3% spoke Nepali, 7.3% Magar, 0.2% Gurung and 0.1% Urdu as their first language.

In terms of ethnicity/caste, 39.8% were Magar, 15.7% Kami, 15.2% Chhetri, 13.9% Thakuri, 5.8% Hill Brahmin, 3.6% Damai/Dholi, 2.2% Gurung, 2.0% Sarki, 1.4% Sanyasi/Dasnami, 0.1% Badi, 0.1% Musalman and 0.1% others.

In terms of religion, 92.6% were Hindu, 5.9% Buddhist, 1.4% Christian and 0.1% Muslim.

In terms of literacy, 64.6% could read and write, 3.9% could only read and 31.4% could neither read nor write.
