= Gurans Rural Municipality =

Rural municipality in Karnali Province, Nepal

Gurans गुराँस
- Rural municipality
- Location in Nepal
- Coordinates: 28.75°N 81.633333°E
- Country: Nepal
- Province: Karnali
- District: Dailekh
- No. of wards: 8
- Established: 10 March 2017

Government
  - Type: Rural council
  - Chairperson: Mr. top bahadur BC (NE.KA.PA YAMALE)
  - Vice-chairperson: Mrs. SIWA KHADKA (NE.KA.PA YAMALE)

Area
  - Total: 164.79 km^{2} (63.63 sq mi)

Population (1001)
  - Total: 22,033
  - Density: 133.70/km^{2} (346.29/sq mi)
- Time zone: UTC+5:45 (NST)
- Website: official website

Gurans (Nepali: गुराँस) is a rural municipality located in Dailekh District of Karnali Province of Nepal.

The total area of the rural municipality is 164.79 square kilometres (63.63 sq mi) and the total population of the rural municipality as of 2011 Nepal census is 22,033 individuals. The rural municipality is divided into total 8 wards.

The rural municipality was established on 10 March 2017, when Government of Nepal restricted all old administrative structure and announced 744 local level units (although the number increased to 753 later) as per the new constitution of Nepal 2015.

Khadkawada, Baraha, Seri, Goganpani, Piladi and Lalikanda Village development committees were incorporated to form this new rural municipality. The headquarters of the municipality is situated at Baraha.

== Demographics ==
At the time of the 2011 Nepal census, Gurans Rural Municipality had a population of 22,033. Of these, 99.7% spoke Nepali, 0.2% Gurung and 0.1% other languages as their first language.

In terms of ethnicity/caste, 48.1% were Chhetri, 17.8% Kami, 10.5% Thakuri, 10.1% Magar, 6.4% Damai/Dholi, 3.1% Hill Brahmin, 2.2% Gurung, 0.8% Sanyasi/Dasnami, 0.5% Badi, 0.1% other Dalit, 0.1% Sarki, 0.1% Tamang and 0.1% others.

In terms of religion, 96.9% were Hindu, 2.8% Buddhist and 0.2% Christian.

In terms of literacy, 67.5% could read and write, 2.6% could only read and 29.8% could neither read nor write.
