= Aathabis =

Aathabis आठबीस
- Municipality
- Location in Nepal
- Coordinates: 29.06°N 81.46°E
- Country: Nepal
- Province: Karnali
- District: Dailekh
- No. of wards: 9
- Established: 10 March 2017

Government
  - Type: Mayor-council
  - Mayor: Mr. Tarka Baduwal (NCP)
  - Deputy mayor: Mrs. Kalpana Thapa (NCP)

Area
  - Total: 168 km^{2} (65 sq mi)

Population (2021)
  - Total: 31,092
  - Density: 185/km^{2} (480/sq mi)
- Time zone: UTC+5:45 (NST)
- Website: official website

Aathabis (Nepali: आठबीस) is an urban municipality located in Dailekh District of Karnali Province of Nepal.

The total area of the municipality is 168 square kilometres (65 sq mi) and the total population of the municipality as of 2021 Nepal census is 31,092 individuals. The municipality is divided into total 9 wards.

The municipality was established on 10 March 2017, when Government of Nepal restricted all old administrative structure and announced 744 local level units as per the new constitution of Nepal 2015.

Sattalla, Sigaudi, Rakam Karnali, Pipalkot, Singasain and Tilepata Village development committees were Incorporated to form this new municipality. The headquarters of the municipality is situated at Rakam Karnali

== Demographics ==
At the time of the 2011 Nepal census, Aathabis Municipality had a population of 29,257. Of these, 97.8% spoke Nepali, 1.3% Magar, 0.6% Kham, 0.1% Maithili, 0.1% Urdu and 0.1% other languages as their first language.

In terms of ethnicity/caste, 32.8% were Chhetri, 24.8% Kami, 14.7% Hill Brahmin, 13.7% Thakuri, 7.1% Damai/Dholi, 4.3% Magar, 1.4% Sanyasi/Dasnami, 0.4% Sarki, 0.3% other Dalit, 0.2% Musalman, 0.1% Badi, 0.1% Gurung, 0.1% Teli and 0.1% others.

In terms of religion, 99.5% were Hindu, 0.2% Buddhist and 0.2% Muslim.

In terms of literacy, 52.5% could read and write, 3.4% could only read and 44.0% could neither read nor write.
