= Narayan Municipality =

Narayan नारायण
- Municipality
- Location in Nepal Narayan (Nepal)
- Coordinates: 28°50′43″N 81°42′50″E
- Country: Nepal
- Province: Karnali
- District: Dailekh
- No. of wards: 11
- Established: 26 March 1997

Government
  - Type: Local Government
  - Mayor: Mr. Loman Sharma(UML)
  - Deputy mayor: Mrs. Tapta Khadka Thapa (UML)

Area
  - Total: 110.63 km^{2} (42.71 sq mi)

Population (2011)
  - Total: 27,037
  - Density: 244.39/km^{2} (632.97/sq mi)
- Time zone: UTC+5:45 (NST)
- Headquarters: Dailekh Bazar
- Website: narayannepal.com.np

Narayan (Nepali: नारायण) is a municipality located in Dailekh District of Karnali Province of Nepal.

The total area of the municipality is 110.63 square kilometres (42.71 sq mi) and the total population of the municipality as of 2011 Nepal census is 27,037 individuals. The municipality is divided into total 11 wards.

The municipality was established on 26 March 1997 merging the then Village development committees of Narayan, Belaspur, Saraswati, Triveni and Basantamala. That time the area of the municipality was 44.26 square kilometres (17.09 mi^{2}) and the total population of those area was 21,110 (according to the 2011 Nepal census).

On 10 March 2017 Government of Nepal restricted old administrative structure and announced 744 local level units (although the number increased to 753 later) as per the new constitution of Nepal 2015. Thus, on 10 March 2017, Bhawani, Bindhyabasini and Kharigaira Village development committees were incorporated with former municipality. The headquarters of the municipality is situated at Dailekh Bazar

== Demographics ==
At the time of the 2011 Nepal census, Narayan Municipality had a population of 27,922. Of these, 96.3% spoke Nepali, 3.3% Magar, 0.2% Maithili, 0.1% Tharu and 0.2% other languages as their first language.

In terms of ethnicity/caste, 39.2% were Chhetri, 13.4% Kami, 11.4% Hill Brahmin, 10.6% Magar, 7.8% Thakuri, 7.1% Sarki, 4.6% Damai/Dholi, 2.6% Newar, 1.3% Gurung, 0.9% Sanyasi/Dasnami, 0.4% Badi, 0.2% Tharu, 0.1% Gharti/Bhujel, 0.1% Musalman, 0.1% Tamang, 0.1% other Terai, 0.1% Yadav and 0.3% others.

In terms of religion, 97.7% were Hindu, 1.9% Christian, 0.3% Buddhist and 0.1% Muslim.

In terms of literacy, 71.1% could read and write, 2.9% could only read and 26.0% could neither read nor write.
