= Mahabu Rural Municipality =

Mahabu महाबु
- Rural municipality
- Location in Nepal
- Coordinates: 28.95°N 81.7°E
- Country: Nepal
- Province: Karnali
- District: Dailekh
- No. of wards: 6
- Established: 10 March 2017

Government
  - Type: Rural council
  - Chairperson: Mr. Jang Bahadur Shahi (NCP)
  - Vice-chairperson: Mrs. Prem Kumari Budha (NCP)

Area
  - Total: 110.80 km^{2} (42.78 sq mi)

Population (2011)
  - Total: 19,277
  - Density: 173.98/km^{2} (450.61/sq mi)
- Time zone: UTC+5:45 (NST)
- Headquarters: Raniban
- Website: official website

Mahabu (Nepali: महाबु) is a rural municipality located in Dailekh District of Karnali Province of Nepal.

The total area of the rural municipality is 110.80 square kilometres (42.78 sq mi) and the total population of the rural municipality as of 2011 Nepal census is 19,277 individuals. The rural municipality is divided into total 6 wards.

The rural municipality was established on 10 March 2017, when Government of Nepal restricted all old administrative structure and announced 744 local level units (although the number increased to 753 later) as per the new constitution of Nepal 2015.

Raniban, Kasikandh, Bansi Bada Khola and part of Kharigaira Village development committees were incorporated to form this new rural municipality. The headquarters of the municipality is situated at Raniban.

== Demographics ==
At the time of the 2011 Nepal census, Mahabu Rural Municipality had a population of 19,277. Of these, 95.6% spoke Nepali, 1.5% Gurung and 0.9% Magar as their first language.

In terms of ethnicity/caste, 24.7% were Chhetri, 20.3% Thakuri, 15.8% Magar, 15.1% Kami, 8.1% Hill Brahmin, 4.2% Sarki, 3.8% Gurung, 3.3% Damai/Dholi, 2.2% Sanyasi/Dasnami, 1.2% other Dalit, 0.8% Badi, 0.1% Marwadi and 0.2% others.

In terms of religion, 95.7% were Hindu, 4.3% Buddhist and 0.1% Christian.

In terms of literacy, 64.6% could read and write, 2.6% could only read and 32.7% could neither read nor write.
