= Bhagawatimai Rural Municipality =

Bhagawatimai भगवतीमाई
- Rural municipality
- Location in Nepal
- Coordinates: 28°48′36″N 81°48′36″E
- Country: Nepal
- Province: Karnali
- District: Dailekh
- No. of wards: 7
- Established: 10 March 2017

Government
  - Type: Rural council
  - Chairperson: Mr. Daan Bahadur Thapa (NCP)
  - Vice-chairperson: Mrs. Chandra Regmi (NCP)

Area
  - Total: 151.52 km^{2} (58.50 sq mi)

Population (2011)
  - Total: 18,778
  - Density: 123.93/km^{2} (320.98/sq mi)
- Time zone: UTC+5:45 (NST)
- Headquarters: Pagnath
- Website: official website

Local levels of Dailekh district

Bhagawatimai (Nepali: भगवतीमाई) is a rural municipality located in Dailekh District of Karnali Province of Nepal.

The total area of the rural municipality is 151.52 square kilometres (58.50 sq mi) and the total population of the rural municipality as of 2011 Nepal census is 18,778 individuals. The rural municipality is divided into total 7 wards.

The rural municipality was established on 10 March 2017, when Government of Nepal restricted all old administrative structure and announced 744 local level units (although the number increased to 753 later) as per the new constitution of Nepal 2015.

Pagnath, Rum, Moheltoli, Jagannath, Katti and Bada Bhairab Village development committees were incorporated to form this new rural municipality. The headquarters of the municipality is situated at Pagnath.

== Demographics ==
At the time of the 2011 Nepal census, Bhagawatimai Rural Municipality had a population of 18,778. Of these, 99.9% spoke Nepali and 0.1% other languages as their first language.

In terms of ethnicity/caste, 42.4% were Chhetri, 26.6% Kami, 15.7% Thakuri, 7.8% Hill Brahmin, 4.3% Damai/Dholi, 2.1% Magar, 0.5% Sarki, 0.3% Badi and 0.1% others.

In terms of religion, 99.8% were Hindu and 0.2% Christian.

In terms of literacy, 61.6% could read and write, 2.9% could only read and 35.5% could neither read nor write.
