= Dungeshwor Rural Municipality =

Dungeshwor डुङ्गेश्वर
- Rural municipality
- डुङ्गेश्वर
- Location in Nepal
- Coordinates: 28°44′24″N 81°41′24″E
- Country: Nepal
- Province: Karnali
- District: Dailekh
- No. of wards: 6
- Established: 10 March 2017

Government
  - Type: Rural council
  - Chairperson: Mr. Sundar K.C (CPNUML)
  - Vice-chairperson: Mrs. Kalawati Neupane (CPNUML)

Area
  - Total: 105.19 km^{2} (40.61 sq mi)

Population (2011)
  - Total: 15,883
  - Density: 150.99/km^{2} (391.07/sq mi)
- Time zone: UTC+5:45 (NST)
- Headquarters: Danda Parajul
- Website: dungeshwormun.gov.np

Dungeshwar (Nepali: डुङ्गेश्वर) is a rural municipality located in Dailekh District of Karnali Province of Nepal.

The total area of the rural municipality is 105.19 square kilometres (40.61 sq mi) and the total population of the rural municipality as of 2011 Nepal census is 15,883 individuals. The rural municipality is divided into total 6 wards.

The rural municipality was established on 10 March 2017, when Government of Nepal restricted all old administrative structure and announced 744 local level units (although the number increased to 753 later) as per the new constitution of Nepal 2015.

Danda Parajul, Awal Parajul, Belpata and Lakuri Village Development Committees were incorporated to form this new rural municipality. The headquarters of the municipality is situated at Danda Parajul.

== Demographics ==
At the time of the 2011 Nepal census, Dungeshwor Rural municipality had a population of 15,883. Of these, 94.6% spoke Nepali, 4.9% Magar, 0.1% Gurung, 0.1% Urdu, 0.1% Maithili and 0.1% other languages as their first language.

In terms of ethnicity/caste, 40.7% were Chhetri, 15.9% Magar, 15.3% Kami, 7.5% Thakuri, 7.2% Hill Brahmin, 5.1% Damai/Dholi, 3.5% Gurung, 2.8% Sarki, 0.5% Sanyasi/Dasnami, 0.4% Musalman, 0.3% Gaine, 0.1% Badi, 0.1% Baraee, 0.1% Newar, 0.1% Rai, 0.1% Tamang and 0.2% others.

In terms of religion, 91.9% were Hindu, 6.7% Buddhist, 1.1% Christian and 0.4% Muslim.

In terms of literacy, 68.2% could read and write, 4.0% could only read and 27.6% could neither read nor write.
