= Dullu =

Dullu Municipality दुल्लु नगरपालिका
- Municipality
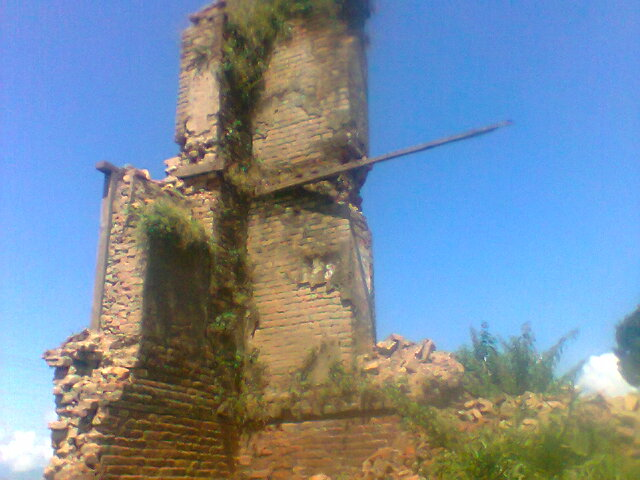

- Location in Nepal Dullu Municipality (Nepal)
- Coordinates: 28.86°N 81.62°E
- Country: Nepal
- Province: Karnali
- District: Dailekh
- Established: 18 May 2014

Government
  - Type: Mayor-council
  - Mayor: Mr. Bharat rijal (NC)
  - Deputy mayor: Mrs. Bina karki (NCP)

Area
  - Total: 156.77 km^{2} (60.53 sq mi)

Population (2011)
  - Total: 41,540
  - Density: 265.0/km^{2} (686.3/sq mi)
- Time zone: UTC+5:45 (NST)
- Website: official website

Dullu (Nepali: दुल्लु) is an urban Municipality in Dailekh District of Karnali Province in Nepal.

At the time of the 2011 Nepal census former Dullu had a population of 30,457 people living in 5,861 individual households. After the reconstruction of local level authority in Nepal in 2017, the total area of the new Dullu municipality has 156.77 square kilometres (60.53 mi^{2}) and total population is now (as of 2011 Nepal census) 41,540.

== History ==
The Municipality was formed merging 6 former Village Development Committee i.e. Naule Katuwal, Nepa, Paduka, Dullu, Pusakot Chiudi and Badalamji since 18 May 2014.

Fulfilling the requirement of the new constitution of Nepal in 2015, all old municipalities (58 municipalities) and villages (more than 3900) were restructured into 753 new Municipalities and Villages, thus Malika, Gauri, Kalbhairab and Gamaudi villages Incorporated with former Dullu municipality.

This place was the winter capital of the kingdom of Sinja and later it became independent until being converted into a subnational kingdom up to 2019 BS when it was annexed into Nepal by King Mahendra. There is a stone tabloid which is supposed to be the first one written in Nepali language .

== Demographics ==
At the time of the 2011 Nepal census, Dullu Municipality had a population of 41,540. Of these, 99.7% spoke Nepali, 0.3% Magar and 0.1% other languages as their first language.

In terms of ethnicity/caste, 45.7% were Chhetri, 16.7% Kami, 9.8% Thakuri, 8.8% Hill Brahmin, 6.7% Sarki, 5.0% Damai/Dholi, 4.1% Sanyasi/Dasnami, 1.2% Magar, 0.5% Kumal, 0.4% Gurung, 0.3% Badi, 0.3% other Dalit, 0.2% Majhi, 0.1% Newar, 0.1% other Terai and 0.1% others.

In terms of religion, 99.7% were Hindu, 0.1% Christian and 0.1% Buddhist.

In terms of literacy, 63.8% could read and write, 3.0% could only read and 33.2% could neither read nor write.
