= Chamunda Bindrasaini =

Chamunda Bindrasaini चामुण्डा बिन्द्रासैनी
- Municipality
- Location in Nepal
- Coordinates: 28.93°N 81.56°E
- Country: Nepal
- Province: Karnali
- District: Dailekh
- No. of wards: 9
- Established: 10 March 2017

Government
  - Mayor: Mr. Ganesh Kumar Shahi (NC)
  - Deputy mayor: Mrs. Mansara Kumari Sharma (NC)

Area
  - Total: 90.60 km^{2} (34.98 sq mi)

Population (2011)
  - Total: 26,149
  - Density: 288.6/km^{2} (747.5/sq mi)
- Time zone: UTC+5:45 (NST)
- Website: official website

Chamunda Bindrasaini (Nepali: चामुण्डा बिन्द्रासैनी) is an urban municipality located in Dailekh District of Karnali Province of Nepal.

The total area of the municipality is 90.60 square kilometres (34.98 sq mi) and the total population of the municipality as of 2011 Nepal census is 26,149 individuals. The municipality is divided into total 9 wards.

The municipality was established on 10 March 2017, when Government of Nepal restricted all old administrative structure and announced 744 local level units as per the new constitution of Nepal 2015.

Lyati Bindraseni, Chamunda and Jambukandh Village development committees were Incorporated to form this new municipality. The headquarters of the municipality is situated at Jambukandh

== Demographics ==
At the time of the 2011 Nepal census, Chamunda Bindrasaini Municipality had a population of 26,149. Of these, 99.0% spoke Nepali, 0.9% Tamang and 0.1% other languages as their first language.

In terms of ethnicity/caste, 24.0% were Thakuri, 20.5% Kami, 20.4% Hill Brahmin, 19.9% Chhetri, 6.2% Damai/Dholi, 4.6% Magar, 2.1% Sarki, 1.1% Tamang, 0.6% Sanyasi/Dasnami, 0.3% Gurung, 0.2% Badi, 0.1% Lohar and 0.1% others.

In terms of religion, 96.5% were Hindu and 3.5% Buddhist.

In terms of literacy, 56.9% could read and write, 3.6% could only read and 39.4% could neither read nor write.
