= Thantikandh Rural Municipality =

Thantikandh ठाँटीकाँध
- Rural municipality
- Location in Nepal
- Coordinates: 28.983333°N 81.55°E
- Country: Nepal
- Province: Karnali
- District: Dailekh
- No. of wards: 6
- Established: 10 March 2017

Government
  - Type: Rural council
  - Chairperson: Mr. Dhir Bahadur Shahi (NCP)
  - Vice-chairperson: Mrs. Sushmita Singh (NCP)

Area
  - Total: 88.22 km^{2} (34.06 sq mi)

Population (2011)
  - Total: 18,896
  - Density: 214.2/km^{2} (554.8/sq mi)
- Time zone: UTC+5:45 (NST)
- Headquarters: Lakhandra
- Website: official website

Thantikandh (Nepali: ठाँटीकाँध) is a rural municipality located in Dailekh District of Karnali Province of Nepal.

The total area of the rural municipality is 88.22 square kilometres (34.06 sq mi) and the total population of the rural municipality as of 2011 Nepal census is 18,896 individuals. The rural municipality is divided into total 6 wards.

The rural municipality was established on 10 March 2017, when Government of Nepal restricted all old administrative structure and announced 744 local level units (although the number increased to 753 later) as per the new constitution of Nepal 2015.

Lakhandra, Bisalla and Tolijaisi Village development committees were incorporated to form this new rural municipality. The headquarters of the municipality is situated at Lakhandra.

== Demographics ==
At the time of the 2011 Nepal census, Thantikandh Rural Municipality had a population of 18,896. Of these, 99.3% spoke Nepali, 0.6% Magar and 0.1% Kham as their first language.

In terms of ethnicity/caste, 35.6% were Chhetri, 28.0% Thakuri, 23.9% Kami, 4.3% Hill Brahmin, 4.1% Magar, 3.8% Damai/Dholi, 0.1% Lohar and 0.2% others.

In terms of religion, 99.9% were Hindu and 0.1% Buddhist.

In terms of literacy, 54.7% could read and write, 3.6% could only read and 41.5% could neither read nor write.
