= Dekendra Thapa =

Nepali journalist (died 2004)

Dekendra Raj Thapa
- डेकेन्द्र थापा
- Died: 11 August 2004 (aged 33); Dailekh, Nepal
- Cause of death: Assassination
- Occupations: Journalist, author

Dekendra Raj Thapa was a Nepali journalist. He was killed by Maoist combatants during the Maoist insurgency in Nepal after getting kidnapped from his home in the Dailekh District of western Nepal. He was working for Radio Nepal, the national broadcasting service at the time.

== Death ==
In June 2004, the Maoists blocked the pipe that brought water to the district capital, Dailekh Bazar, and Dekendra Raj Thapa and other journalists walked to the Maoist-controlled area to try to persuade them to open it. Instead, they were kidnapped by the rebels, and while Kamal Neupane and Gorakh Bahadur Singh were released, Dekendra was detained. Dekendra was to remain in Dwari VDC, Dailekh District, as Maoist had "unfinished business" with him.

Maoists abducted Thapa on 26 June, and a rebel commander said on 16 August that they had executed him on 11 August 2004, according to local news reports. Dekendra Raj Thapa was killed two months after the rebels abducted him.

His corpse was discovered after four years buried inside a local forest. It was found that since his mouth was found open and two bones were broken, he was buried alive. The police arrested 5 (Nirak Bahadur Gharti, Jaya Bahadur Shahi, Harilal Pun, and Bir Bahadur K.C) people after 8 years of killing in charge of their involvement in the killing of Mr. Thapa. However, Mukti, Arun, and Keshav Khadka, who had personally interrogated Thapa were not present in court. The case's verdict received criticism for its minimum sentencing for the accused.

In August 2006, Thapa's body was exhumed by forensic experts. His body was cremated.

== Timeline ==
June 2004 Radio journalist Dekendra Raj Thapa abducted from Toli VDC

11 August 2004 Dekendra Raj Thapa buried alive in Dwari after month-and-half of torture

28 August 2008 Laxmi Thapa lodged FIR at Dailekh Police about her husband's murder

2012 Prime Minister Baburam Bhattarai and his handpicked attorney general Mukti Pradhan order police investigation quashed

5 January 2013 Police arrest Lachhiram Gharti and five others for the murder of Dekendra Thapa

28 January 2013 State lawyers file case against accused and on 31 January court ordered them arrested

4 July 2013 The Appellate Court in Surkhet upholds verdict against accused

5 August 2013 The Supreme Court overturns the verdict and orders the accused to be freed

20 August 2014 District court schedules to have the final hearing on the Dekendra case. The hearing was postponed to 3 November 2014 due to recent floods which have disrupted mobility in the district.

7 December 2014 District Court convicts five of the accused

== Court's decision ==
On Sunday, 7 December 2014, the Dailekh District Court awarded punishment in the case. The five accused are awarded imprisonment of one and a half to two years. Two of those awarded have already finished the term of their punishment, hence they were supposed to be released on 8 December 2014.

== See also ==
- List of kidnappings
- List of solved missing person cases (post-2000)
