= Guthu =

Gutu (chaukune) गुटु
- Village development committee
- Location in Nepal
- Coordinates: 28.87°N 81.31°E
- Country: Nepal
- Zone: Bheri Zone
- District: Surkhet District

Population (1991)
  - Total: 5,036
- Time zone: UTC+5:45 (Nepal Time)

Gutu is a village in the western part of Surkhet District in the Bheri Zone of the Karnali province and former Mid-Western Development Region of Nepal, according to the former administrative divisions. According to the 11th National Census 2068, the population of the village was 7,640, of which 3,692 were males and 3,948 were females, and there were 1,422 households. It is currently the headquarters of Chaukune Rural Municipality.

This place is considered very historical. From the hills in the upper part, one can see a beautiful view of the plain valley. It is said that the word Guthu of the Guthi clans is a corruption of Guthu.
