= Goganpani =

Goganpani may refer to several places in Nepal:

- Goganpani, Bagmati
- Goganpani, Bheri
