= Ghoreta =

Ghoreta घोरेटा
- Village development committee
- Location in Nepal
- Coordinates: 28.63°N 81.96°E
- Country: Nepal
- Zone: Bheri Zone
- District: Surkhet District

Population (1991)
  - Total: 1,936
- Time zone: UTC+5:45 (Nepal Time)

Ghoreta is a village development committee in Surkhet District in the Bheri Zone of mid-western Nepal. At the time of the 1991 Nepal census, it had a population of 1936 people living in 308 individual households.
