= Baise Rajya =

Former confederation in Nepal

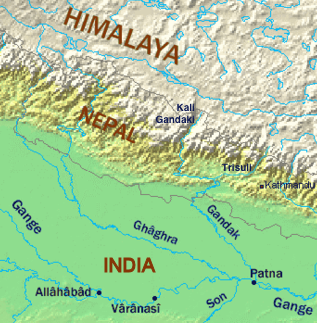
Karnali River (labelled Ghaghra) among the tributaries of the Ganges

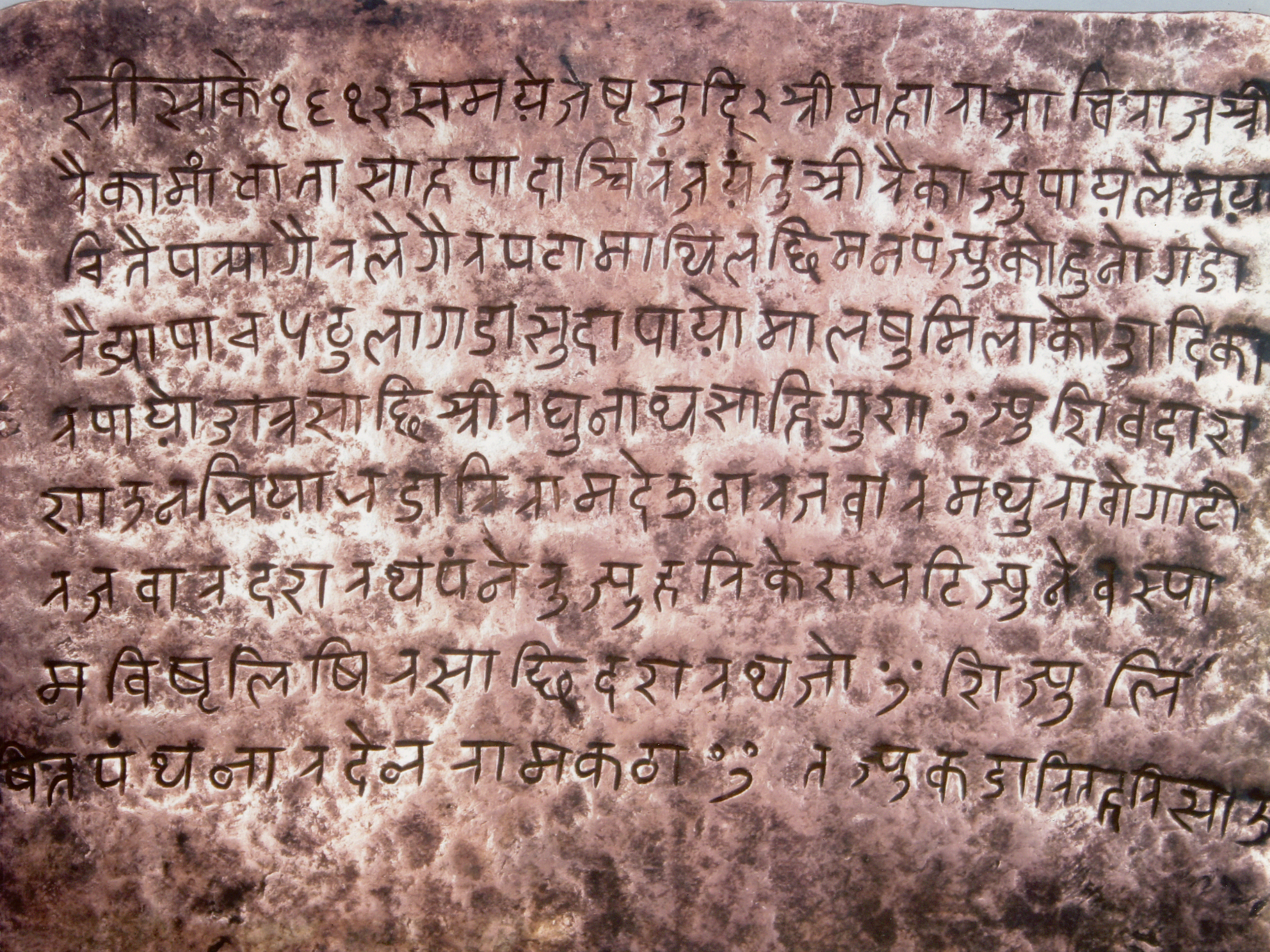
Copper Inscription by Baise King of Doti, Raika Mandhata Shahi at Saka Era 1612 (शाके १६१२) (or 1747 Bikram Samvat) in old Khas language using Devanagari script.

The Baise Rajya (Nepali: बाइसे राज्यहरू, lit. ‘22 kingdoms’) were sovereign and intermittently allied petty kingdoms in the western hills of what is now Nepal, located around the Karnali–Bheri river basin. They formed after the break up of the Khasa-Malla kingdom. These kingdoms were ruled by local dynasties, of Magar chieftains, depending on the region. Several of these kingdoms, particularly in areas like Rukum, Rolpa, and Pyuthan, had strong Magar leadership and populations. The Baise states maintained varying degrees of independence until they were gradually annexed during the unification of Nepal from 1744 to 1810. Although Prithvi Narayan Shah (r. 1743–1775), the founder of the Gorkha kingdom, initiated the unification, it was completed under his successors by the end of the 18th century.

The 22 principalities were Jumla, Doti, Jajarkot, Bajura, Gajur, Malneta, Thalahara, Dailekh District, Dullu, Duryal, Dang, Sallyana, Chilli, Tulsipur State, Darnar, Atbis Gotam, Majal, Gurnakot, and Rukum. (Note: According to Pradhan, the Baise States included Kumaon, Garhwal in the west, Western Tibet in the north and Surkhet alogwith inner Terai valleys in the south.) These Baise states were ruled by Khasas and several decentralized tribal polities.

== List of Rajyas (22 states) ==
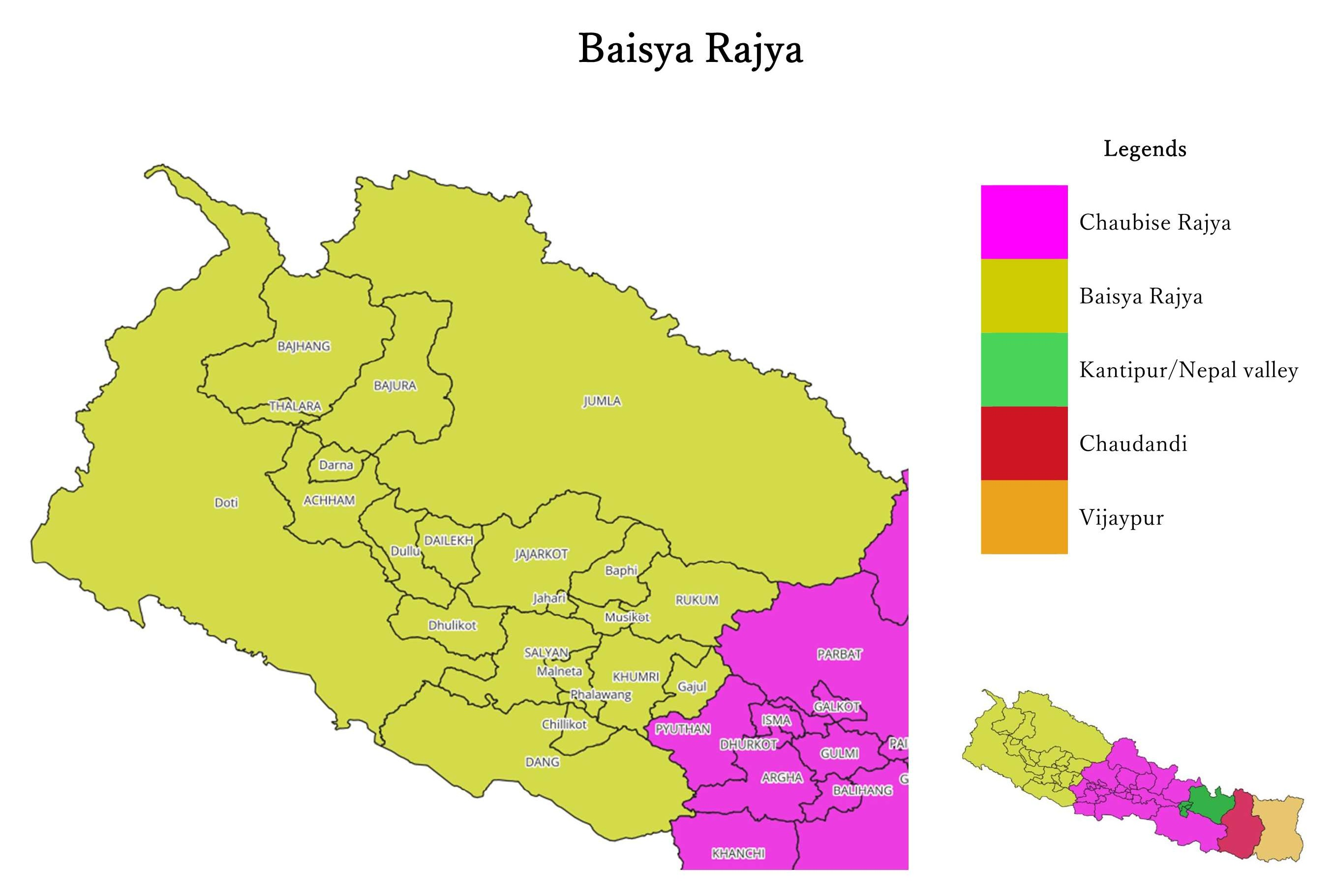

Rajya	Annexation to Nepal	Notes
Atbis Gotam	1786	Also known as Gutam.
Bajura	August 1791	Became a vassal state of the Kingdom of Nepal.
Biskot	1782	Also possibly known as Bosakot.
Chilli	.	Descended from Raja Malaibam, Raja of Bajhang in the 14th century.
Dailekh	.	.
Dang Tulsipur	1786	Founded around 1350, by a scion of the predecessor Kingdom of Sarasvati House of Tulsipur
Darnar	.	Also spelled Darna, it became a vassal state of the Kingdom of Nepal.
Doti	1786	.
Dullu	1790	Also known as Raskot, it was founded by a division of the Kingdom of Mailbham around 1378.
Duryal	.	.
Gajur	.	.
Gurnakot	.	Possibly the same as Garhunkot, it became a vassal state of the Kingdom of Nepal.
Jajarkot	.	Became a vassal state of the Kingdom of Nepal, also known originally as Jagatipur.
Jehari	.	Descended from Raja Malaibam, Raja of Bajhang in the 14th century.
Jumla	October 1788	Annexation date also given as September 1789.
Majal	.	.
Malneta	.	Became a vassal state of the Kingdom of Nepal.
Musikot	1786	Descended from Raja Malaibam, Raja of Bajhang in the 14th century.
Phalawagh	.	Possibly the same as Salyana.
Rukum	.	Descended from Raja Malaibam, Raja of Bajhang in the 14th century.
Salyana	25 September 1786	It was made a vassal state after annexation and was ultimately abolished in 1961, with the Raja still receiving a Privy Purse until the abolishment of the Nepali monarchy.
Thalahara	.	Became a vassal state of the Kingdom of Nepal.

A parallel confederation of 24 principalities Chaubisi rajya (Nepali: चौबिसी राज्य) occupied most of the Gandaki basin east of the Baisi.

== See also ==
- Chaubisi Rajya

== Citations ==
=== Sources ===
- Pradhan, Kumar L. (2012), Thapa Politics in Nepal: With Special Reference to Bhim Sen Thapa, 1806–1839, New Delhi: Concept Publishing Company, ISBN 9788180698132
