= Ghatgaun =

Coordinates: 28°46′N 81°16′E

Ghatgaun घतगाउँ
- Village development committee
- Interactive map of Ghatgaun
- Country: Nepal
- Zone: Bheri Zone
- District: Surkhet District

Population (1991)
  - Total: 3,352
- Time zone: UTC+5:45 (Nepal Time)

Ghatgaun is a village development committee in Surkhet District in the Bheri Zone of mid-western Nepal. At the time of the 1991 Nepal census it had a population of 3352 people living in 659 individual households.
