= Baluwatar =

Baluwatar may refer to:

- Baluwatar, Bheri, Nepal
- Baluwatar, Kathmandu, Nepal
