= Jarbuta =

Jarbuta जरबुटा
- Village development committee
- Location in Nepal
- Coordinates: 28.62°N 81.66°E
- Country: Nepal
- Zone: Bheri Zone
- District: Surkhet District

Population (2011)
  - Total: 8,580
- Time zone: UTC+5:45 (Nepal Time)

Jarbuta is a village development committee in Surkhet District in the Bheri Zone of mid-western Nepal. At the time of the 1991 Nepal census it had a population of 5243 people living in 949 individual households. As of the 2011 Nepal census it had a population of 8580 people living in 1,837 individual households.
