= Garpan =

Garpan गर्पन Meheli
- Village development committee
- Nickname: meheli
- Location in Nepal
- Coordinates: 28.63°N 81.74°E
- Country: Nepal
- Zone: Bheri Zone
- District: Surkhet District

Population (1991)
  - Total: 1,953
- Time zone: UTC+5:45 (Nepal Time)

Garpan is a village development committee in Surkhet District in the Bheri Zone of mid-western Nepal. At the time of the 1991 Nepal census it had a population of 1953 people living in 354 individual households.
