= Pokharikanda =

Pokharikanda पोखरीकाँडा
- Village development committee
- Location in Nepal
- Coordinates: 28.76°N 81.48°E
- Country: Nepal
- Zone: Bheri Zone
- District: Surkhet District

Population (1991)
  - Total: 2,669
- Time zone: UTC+5:45 (Nepal Time)

Pokharikanda is a village development committee in Surkhet District in the Bheri Zone of mid-western Nepal. At the time of the 1991 Nepal census it had a population of 2,669 people living in 431 individual households.

The cheapest way to get from Nepal to Pokharikanda is to bus and train and drive which costs ₹2,100 - ₹3,000 and takes 21h 53m.
