= Naumule (village) =

Naumule नौमुले
- Village
- Location in Nepal
- Coordinates: 28.91°N 81.83°E
- Country: Nepal
- Province: Karnali
- District: Dailekh

Population (1991)
  - Total: 1,610
- Time zone: UTC+05:45 (Nepal Time)

Naumule is a village and former village development committee in Dailekh District of Karnali Province of Nepal, now in Naumule Rural Municipality. At the time of the 1991 Nepal census it had a population of 1610 people living in 251 individual households.
