= Saraswati, Nepal =

Saraswati, Nepal सरस्वती
- Village development committee
- Country: Nepal
- Zone: Bheri Zone
- District: Dailekh District

Population (1991)
  - Total: 3,836
- Time zone: UTC+5:45 (Nepal Time)

Saraswati is a village development committee in Dailekh District in the Bheri Zone of western-central Nepal. At the time of the 1991 Nepal census, it had a population of 3836 people living in 680 individual households.
