= List of gaunpalikas of Nepal =

Gaunpalika
- Also known as: Rural Municipality
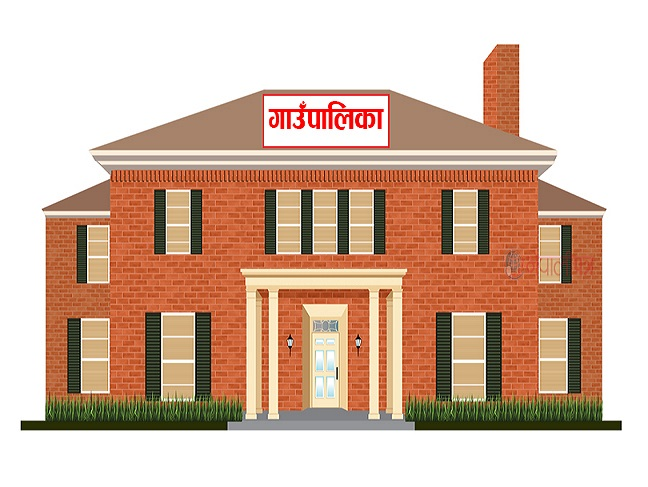
- Category: Rural Municipality
- Location: Nepal
- Number: 460 (as of 2017)
- Populations: 59,946–538
- Areas: 2,419.64 square kilometres (934.23 sq mi) - 15.48 square kilometres (5.98 sq mi)
- Government: Rural Council
- Subdivisions: Wards

Gaunpalika (Nepali: गाउँपालिका, romanized: gāunpālikā, lit. 'Rural municipal') is the newly formed lower administrative division in Nepal. This administrative division was established in 2017, and replaced the existing village development committees. There are currently 460 rural municipalities.

This is a list of the gaunpalikas, or rural municipalities, of Nepal published by the Ministry of Federal Affairs and General Administration.

== Classification ==
The Ministry of Federal Affairs and General Administration has classified the local units into four grades based on infrastructure and social development.

Classification	Type	Quantity
Grade 'A'	Very remote	145
Grade 'B'	Remote	174
Grade 'C'	Fairly accessible	141
Grade 'D'	Accessible	0

== Rural Municipality ==
Rural Municipalities in blue

There are 460 rural municipalities in Nepal.

Name	Nepali	Province	District	Population (2021)	Area (KM^{2})	Wards
Hatuwagadhi	हतुवागढी	Koshi	Bhojpur	16,175	142.61	9
Ramprasad Rai	रामप्रसाद राई	Koshi	Bhojpur	15,673	158.83	8
Tyamke Maiyum	ट्याम्केमैयुम	Koshi	Bhojpur	15,464	173.41	9
Aamchok	आमचोक	Koshi	Bhojpur	14,968	184.89	10
Arun	अरुण	Koshi	Bhojpur	14,591	154.76	7
Salpa Silichho	साल्पासिलिछो	Koshi	Bhojpur	12,284	193.33	6
Pauwa Dungma	पौवादुङमा	Koshi	Bhojpur	12,107	118.86	6
Sangurigadhi	सागुरीगढी	Koshi	Dhankuta	19,561	166.44	10
Sahidbhumi	सहीदभूमि	Koshi	Dhankuta	17,767	99.55	7
Chaubise	चौविसे	Koshi	Dhankuta	17,677	147.6	8
Chhathar Jorpati	छथर जोरपाटी	Koshi	Dhankuta	16,456	102.83	6
Chulachuli	चुलाचुली	Koshi	Ilam	23,157	108.46	6
Phakphokthum	फाकफोकथुम	Koshi	Ilam	19,706	108.79	7
Mai Jogmai	माईजोगमाई	Koshi	Ilam	19,131	172.41	6
Rong	रोङ	Koshi	Ilam	17,367	155.06	6
Mangsebung	माङसेबुङ	Koshi	Ilam	16,810	142.41	6
Sandakpur	सन्दकपुर	Koshi	Ilam	15,444	156.01	5
Kamal	कमल	Koshi	Jhapa	53,894	104.57	7
Buddha Shanti	बुद्धशान्ति	Koshi	Jhapa	53,010	79.78	7
Kachankawal	कचनकवल	Koshi	Jhapa	41,317	109.45	7
Jhapa	झापा	Koshi	Jhapa	39,302	94.12	7
Barhadashi	बाह्रदशी	Koshi	Jhapa	37,946	88.44	7
Gaurigunj	गौरीगंज	Koshi	Jhapa	35,506	101.35	6
Haldibari	हल्दीवारी	Koshi	Jhapa	32,722	117.34	5
Khotehang	खोटेहाङ	Koshi	Khotang	16,846	164.09	9
Diprung Chuichumma	दिप्रुङ	Koshi	Khotang	16,305	136.59	7
Kepilasgadhi	केपिलासगढी	Koshi	Khotang	13,231	191.55	7
Aiselukharka	ऐसेलुखर्क	Koshi	Khotang	13,217	125.93	7
Jante Dhunga	जन्तेढुंगा	Koshi	Khotang	12,016	128.68	6
Barah Pokhari	बराहपोखरी	Koshi	Khotang	11,397	141.57	6
Rawabesi	रावाबेसी	Koshi	Khotang	11,199	97.44	6
Sakela	साकेला	Koshi	Khotang	9,623	79.99	5
Budhi Ganga	बुढीगंगा	Koshi	Morang	51,497	56.41	7
Katahari	कटहरी	Koshi	Morang	48,510	51.59	7
Jahada	जहदा	Koshi	Morang	47,639	62.38	7
Dhanpalthan	धनपालथान	Koshi	Morang	45,348	70.26	7
Kanepokhari	कानेपोखरी	Koshi	Morang	43,193	82.83	7
Gramthan	ग्रामथान	Koshi	Morang	36,024	71.84	7
Kerabari	केरावारी	Koshi	Morang	34,504	219.83	10
Miklajung	मिक्लाजुङ	Koshi	Morang	33,167	158.98	9
Manebhanjyang	मानेभञ्ज्याङ	Koshi	Okhaldhunga	19,597	146.61	9
Sunkoshi	सुनकोशी	Koshi	Okhaldhunga	17,783	143.75	
Molung	मोलुङ	Koshi	Okhaldhunga	16,440	112	
Champadevi	चम्पादेवी	Koshi	Okhaldhunga	16,311	126.91	10
Khiji Demba	खिजिदेम्बा	Koshi	Okhaldhunga	15,559	179.77	
Chisankhugadhi	चिसंखुगढी	Koshi	Okhaldhunga	13,844	126.91	
Likhu	लिखु	Koshi	Okhaldhunga	12,104	88.03	
Phalgunanda	फाल्गुनन्द	Koshi	Panchthar	21,289	107.53	
Miklajung	मिक्लाजुङ	Koshi	Panchthar	21,061	166.61	
Phalelung	फालेलुङ	Koshi	Panchthar	20,361	207.14	
Hilihang	हिलिहाङ	Koshi	Panchthar	19,085	123.01	
Yangwarak	याङवरक	Koshi	Panchthar	16,821	208.63	
Kummayak	कुम्मायक	Koshi	Panchthar	12,746	129.3	
Tumbewa	तुम्बेवा	Koshi	Panchthar	11,189	117.34	
Makalu	मकालु	Koshi	Sankhuwasabha	13,424	519.45	
Silichong	सिलीचोङ	Koshi	Sankhuwasabha	10,296	293.26	
Sabhapokhari	सभापोखरी	Koshi	Sankhuwasabha	9,970	222.08	
Chichila	चिचिला	Koshi	Sankhuwasabha	6,577	88.63	
Bhot Khola	भोटखोला	Koshi	Sankhuwasabha	6,438	639.01	
Thulung Dudhkoshi	थुलुङ दुधकोशी	Koshi	Solukhumbu	18,354	144.6	
Mapya Dudhkoshi	माप्य दुधकोशी	Koshi	Solukhumbu	12,648	167.67	
Maha Kulung	महाकुलुङ	Koshi	Solukhumbu	11,847	648.05	
Necha Salyan	नेचासल्यान	Koshi	Solukhumbu	11,381	94.49	
Sotang	सोताङ	Koshi	Solukhumbu	9,025	103	
Khumbu Pasang Lhamu	खुम्बु पासाङल्हमु	Koshi	Solukhumbu	8,720	1,539.11	
Likhu Pike	लिखुपिके	Koshi	Solukhumbu	5,334	124.38	
Harinagar	हरिनगरा	Koshi	Sunsari	49,845	52.29	
Bhokraha Narsingh	भोक्राहा	Koshi	Sunsari	49,280	63.37	
Koshi	कोशी	Koshi	Sunsari	48,804	75.98	
Dewanganj	देवानगन्ज	Koshi	Sunsari	39,030	53.56	
Gadhi	गढी	Koshi	Sunsari	38,739	67.7	
Barju	बर्जु	Koshi	Sunsari	36,249	69.43	
Sirijangha	सिरीजङ्घा	Koshi	Taplejung	14,114	481.09	
Aathrai Triveni	आठराई त्रिवेणी	Koshi	Taplejung	12,296	88.83	
Meringden	मेरिङदेन	Koshi	Taplejung	11,838	210.33	
Pathibhara Yangwarak	पाथीभरा याङवरक	Koshi	Taplejung	11,806	93.76	
Phaktanglung	फक्ताङलुङ	Koshi	Taplejung	11,791	1,858.51	
Sidingwa	सिदिङ्वा	Koshi	Taplejung	10,979	206	
Maiwa Khola	मैवाखोला	Koshi	Taplejung	10,213	138	
Mikwa Khola	मिक्वाखोला	Koshi	Taplejung	7,964	442.96	
Aathrai	आठराई	Koshi	Terhathum	18,156	167.07	
Phedap	फेदाप	Koshi	Terhathum	15,169	110.83	
Chhathar	छथर	Koshi	Terhathum	14,197	133.93	
Menchhayayem	मेन्छयायेम	Koshi	Terhathum	6,678	70.09	
Udayapurgadhi	उदयपुरगढी	Koshi	Udayapur	28,926	209.51	
Rautamai	रौतामाई	Koshi	Udayapur	20,324	204.08	
Tapli	ताप्ली	Koshi	Udayapur	13,344	119.11	
Limchungbung	लिम्चुङबुङ	Koshi	Udayapur	9,689	106.8	
Subarna	सुवर्ण	Madhesh	Bara	35,141	36.84	
Adarsha Kotwal	आदर्श कोतवाल	Madhesh	Bara	31,364	36.25	
Baragadhi	बारागढी	Madhesh	Bara	29,555	39.29	
Karaiyamai	करैयामाई	Madhesh	Bara	29,165	47.69	
Pheta	फेटा	Madhesh	Bara	28,395	23.65	
Prasauni	प्रसौनी	Madhesh	Bara	25,414	20.24	
Devtal	देवताल	Madhesh	Bara	25,361	23.31	
Bishrampur	विश्रामपुर	Madhesh	Bara	24,892	19.81	
Parwanipur	परवानीपुर	Madhesh	Bara	24,745	15.48	
Lakshminya	लक्ष्मीनिया	Madhesh	Dhanusha	31,881	30.66	
Mukhiyapatti Musharniya	मुखियापट्टी मुसहरमिया	Madhesh	Dhanusha	28,208	26.84	
Janak Nandini	जनकनन्दिनी	Madhesh	Dhanusha	27,146	27.62	
Aurahi	औरही	Madhesh	Dhanusha	24,053	25.56	
Dhanauji	धनौजी	Madhesh	Dhanusha	21,942	22.13	
Bateshwar	बटेश्वर	Madhesh	Dhanusha	21,742	31.66	
Sonama	सोनमा	Madhesh	Mahottari	43,082	57.77	
Pipara	पिपरा	Madhesh	Mahottari	40,535	39.98	
Samsi	साम्सी	Madhesh	Mahottari	38,585	21.57	
Ekdara	एकडारा	Madhesh	Mahottari	31,770	24	
Mahottari	महोत्तरी	Madhesh	Mahottari	28,807	28.08	
Sakhuwa Prasauni	सखुवा प्रसौनी	Madhesh	Parsa	35,399	74.27	
Jagarnathpur	जगरनाथपुर	Madhesh	Parsa	32,649	45.29	
Chhipahrmai	छिपहरमाई	Madhesh	Parsa	29,082	24.9	
Paterwa Sugauli	पटेर्वा सुगौली	Madhesh	Parsa	25,498	64.29	
Bindabasini	बिन्दबासिनी	Madhesh	Parsa	24,991	26.04	
Kalikamai	कालिकामाई	Madhesh	Parsa	23,480	24.66	
Jirabhawani	जिरा भवानी	Madhesh	Parsa	22,677	55.39	
Dhobini	धोबीनी	Madhesh	Parsa	22,606	24.41	
Pakaha Mainpur	पकाहा मैनपुर	Madhesh	Parsa	22,585	21.26	
Thori	ठोरी	Madhesh	Parsa	17,219	128.67	
Yamunamai	यमुनामाई	Madhesh	Rautahat	28,414	16.7	
Durga Bhagawati	दुर्गा भगवती	Madhesh	Rautahat	22,864	19.8	
Tilathi Koiladi	तिलाठी कोईलाडी	Madhesh	Saptari	33,658	32.91	
Rajgadh	राजगढ	Madhesh	Saptari	32,462	47.9	
Agnisaira Krishnasavaran	अग्निसाइर कृष्णासवरन	Madhesh	Saptari	31,634	103.08	
Mahadeva	महादेवा	Madhesh	Saptari	30,315	34.97	
Chhinnamasta	छिन्नमस्ता	Madhesh	Saptari	29,946	38.71	
Rupani	रुपनी	Madhesh	Saptari	29,877	56.08	
Bishnupur	बिष्णुपुर	Madhesh	Saptari	27,703	37	
Tirahut	तिरहुत	Madhesh	Saptari	24,034	37.81	
Balan-Bihul	बलान-बिहुल	Madhesh	Saptari	23,527	33.04	
Chandranagar	चन्द्रनगर	Madhesh	Sarlahi	36,908	47.5	
Brahampuri	ब्रह्मपुरी	Madhesh	Sarlahi	31,378	33.89	
Ramnagar	रामनगर	Madhesh	Sarlahi	31,366	26.44	
Chakraghatta	चक्रघट्टा	Madhesh	Sarlahi	29,550	25.16	
Kaudena	कौडेना	Madhesh	Sarlahi	28,702	25.33	
Bishnu	विष्णु	Madhesh	Sarlahi	28,570	28.09	
Dhanakaul	धनकौल	Madhesh	Sarlahi	27,974	45.94	
Basbariya	बसबरिया	Madhesh	Sarlahi	25,905	29.42	
Parsa	पर्सा	Madhesh	Sarlahi	24,005	23.12	
Laxmipur Patari	लक्ष्मीपुर पतारी	Madhesh	Siraha	31,118	42.33	
Bariyarpatti	बरियारपट्टी	Madhesh	Siraha	29,712	37.72	
Arnama	अर्नमा	Madhesh	Siraha	27,899	37.76	
Aurahi	औरही	Madhesh	Siraha	26,478	35.87	
Bhagwanpur	भगवानपुर	Madhesh	Siraha	23,380	33.03	
Bishnupur	विष्णुपुर	Madhesh	Siraha	22,781	26.34	
Naraha	नरहा	Madhesh	Siraha	22,760	29.28	
Sakhuwa Nankarkatti	सखुवानान्कारकट्टी	Madhesh	Siraha	20,844	32.84	
Navarajpur	नवराजपुर	Madhesh	Siraha	20,788	32.18	
Ichchhakamana	इच्छाकामना	Bagmati	Chitwan	27,643	166.73	
Benighat Rorang	बेनीघाट रोराङ्ग	Bagmati	Dhading	33,854	29.17	
Thakre	थाक्रे	Bagmati	Dhading	32,374	96.41	
Gajuri	गजुरी	Bagmati	Dhading	28,634	138.66	
Galchhi	गल्छी	Bagmati	Dhading	23,733	129.08	
Siddhalekh	सिद्धलेक	Bagmati	Dhading	22,214	106.09	
Tripurasundari	त्रिपुरासुन्दरी	Bagmati	Dhading	21,937	271.23	
Jwalamukhi	ज्वालामूखी	Bagmati	Dhading	21,338	114.04	
Ganga Jamuna	गङ्गाजमुना	Bagmati	Dhading	19,265	152.72	
Netrawati Dabjong	नेत्रावती डबजोङ	Bagmati	Dhading	11,310	181.78	
Rubi Valley	रुवी भ्याली	Bagmati	Dhading	10,781	401.85	
Khaniyabas	खनियाबास	Bagmati	Dhading	10,287	120.8	
Kalinchok	कालिन्चोक	Bagmati	Dolakha	21,097	132.49	
Shailung	शैलुङ	Bagmati	Dolakha	17,923	128.67	
Baiteshwar	वैतेश्वर	Bagmati	Dolakha	17,896	80.41	
Bigu	विगु	Bagmati	Dolakha	16,490	663.2	
Gaurishankar	गौरिशंकर	Bagmati	Dolakha	15,995	681.39	
Melung	मेलुङ	Bagmati	Dolakha	15,893	86.54	
Tamakoshi	तामाकोशी	Bagmati	Dolakha	15,163	153.06	
Roshi	रोशी	Bagmati	Kavrepalanchok	23,790	176	
Temal	तेमाल	Bagmati	Kavrepalanchok	16,957	89	
Mahabharat	महाभारत	Bagmati	Kavrepalanchok	16,079	186	
Bhumlu	भुम्लु	Bagmati	Kavrepalanchok	15,678	91	
Bethanchok	बेथानचोक	Bagmati	Kavrepalanchok	14,959	101	
Chaunri Deurali	चौंरी देउराली	Bagmati	Kavrepalanchok	14,076	98	
Khanikhola	खानीखोला	Bagmati	Kavrepalanchok	12,201	132	
Bagmati	बाग्मती	Bagmati	Lalitpur	11,353	111.49	
Konjyosom	कोन्ज्योसोम	Bagmati	Lalitpur	8,989	44.16	
Mahankal	महाङ्काल	Bagmati	Lalitpur	8,122	82.44	
Manahari	मनहरी	Bagmati	Makwanpur	47,353	199.52	
Bakaiya	बकैया	Bagmati	Makwanpur	40,907	393.75	
Bagmati	बाग्मती	Bagmati	Makwanpur	30,425	311.79	
Raksirang	राक्सिराङ्ग	Bagmati	Makwanpur	25,996	226.7	
Makawanpurgadhi	मकवानपुरगढी	Bagmati	Makwanpur	24,461	148.72	
Kailash	कैलाश	Bagmati	Makwanpur	21,856	204.48	
Bhimphedi	भीमफेदी	Bagmati	Makwanpur	21,516	245.27	
Indrasarowar	ईन्द्र सरोवर	Bagmati	Makwanpur	13,534	97.34	
Kakani	ककनी	Bagmati	Nuwakot	24,504	87.97	
Dupcheshwar	दुप्चेश्वर	Bagmati	Nuwakot	21,005	131.62	
Likhu	लिखु	Bagmati	Nuwakot	17,728	47.88	
Shivapuri	शिवपुरी	Bagmati	Nuwakot	17,203	101.5	
Tadi	तादी	Bagmati	Nuwakot	15,933	69.8	
Suryagadhi	सुर्यगढी	Bagmati	Nuwakot	14,919	49.09	
Kispang	किस्पाङ	Bagmati	Nuwakot	14,235	82.57	
Tarkeshwar	तारकेश्वर	Bagmati	Nuwakot	14,184	72.62	
Panchakanya	पञ्चकन्या	Bagmati	Nuwakot	13,818	53.47	
Myagang	म्यागङ	Bagmati	Nuwakot	12,668	97.83	
Khandadevi	खाँडादेवी	Bagmati	Ramechhap	19,312	150.7	
Likhu Tamakoshi	लिखु तामाकोशी	Bagmati	Ramechhap	18,325	124.51	
Gokulganga	गोकुलगङ्गा	Bagmati	Ramechhap	17,798	198.4	
Doramba	दोरम्बा	Bagmati	Ramechhap	17,686	140.88	
Umakunda	उमाकुण्ड	Bagmati	Ramechhap	16,590	451.99	
Sunapati	सुनापती	Bagmati	Ramechhap	14,658	86.98	
Naukunda	नौकुण्ड	Bagmati	Rasuwa	12,344	126.99	
Kalika	कालिका	Bagmati	Rasuwa	10,115	192.54	
Uttargaya	उत्तरगया	Bagmati	Rasuwa	8,555	104.51	
Gosaikund	गोसाईकुण्ड	Bagmati	Rasuwa	7,788	978.77	
Aamachodingmo	आमाछोदिङमो	Bagmati	Rasuwa	6,673	682.23	
Tinpatan	तिनपाटन	Bagmati	Sindhuli	34,889	280.26	
Marin	मरिण	Bagmati	Sindhuli	28,808	324.55	
Hariharpurgadhi	हरिहरपुरगढी	Bagmati	Sindhuli	26,505	343.9	
Golanjor	गोलन्जोर	Bagmati	Sindhuli	18,737	184.13	
Sunkoshi	सुनकोशी	Bagmati	Sindhuli	18,375	154.68	
Phikkal	फिक्कल	Bagmati	Sindhuli	15,910	186.06	
Ghyanglekh	घ्याङलेख	Bagmati	Sindhuli	12,652	166.77	
Indrawati	ईन्द्रावती	Bagmati	Sindhupalchok	25,365	105.09	
Panchpokhari Thangpal	पाँचपोखरी थाङपाल	Bagmati	Sindhupalchok	20,997	187.29	
Jugal	जुगल	Bagmati	Sindhupalchok	18,303	273.62	
Helambu	हेलम्बु	Bagmati	Sindhupalchok	17,497	287.26	
Balephi	बलेफी	Bagmati	Sindhupalchok	17,085	61.6	
Sunkoshi	सुनकोशी	Bagmati	Sindhupalchok	15,176	72.84	
Bhotekoshi	भोटेकोशी	Bagmati	Sindhupalchok	14,318	278.31	
Tripurasundari	त्रिपुरासुन्दरी	Bagmati	Sindhupalchok	12,014	94.28	
Lisankhu Pakhar	लिसंखु पाखर	Bagmati	Sindhupalchok	11,750	98.61	
Badigad	वडिगाड	Gandaki	Baglung	28,839	178.68	
Nisikhola	निसीखोला	Gandaki	Baglung	23,119	244.37	
Kathekhola	काठेखोला	Gandaki	Baglung	22,526	82.88	
Bareng	वरेङ	Gandaki	Baglung	11,158	75.28	
Tarakhola	ताराखोला	Gandaki	Baglung	10,120	129.53	
Tamankhola	तमानखोला	Gandaki	Baglung	9,982	178.02	
Shahid Lakhan	शहिद लखन	Gandaki	Gorkha	23,076	148.97	
Barpak Sulikot	बारपाक सुलीकोट	Gandaki	Gorkha	22,636	200.63	
Aarughat	आरूघाट	Gandaki	Gorkha	21,572	160.79	
Gandaki	गण्डकी	Gandaki	Gorkha	21,394	123.86	
Siranchowk	सिरानचोक	Gandaki	Gorkha	19,719	121.66	
Bhimsen Thapa	भिमसेनथापा	Gandaki	Gorkha	16,986	101.25	
Dharche	धार्चे	Gandaki	Gorkha	14,263	651.52	
Ajirkot	अजिरकोट	Gandaki	Gorkha	12,832	198.05	
Tsum Nubri	चुम नुव्री	Gandaki	Gorkha	5,932	1,648.65	
Machhapuchhre	माछापुछ्रे	Gandaki	Kaski	22,898	544.58	
Annapurna	अन्नपुर्ण	Gandaki	Kaski	22,099	33.33	
Madi	मादी	Gandaki	Kaski	16,142	563	
Rupa	रूपा	Gandaki	Kaski	14,891	94.81	
Marsyangdi	मर्स्याङदी	Gandaki	Lamjung	17,080	597.25	
Dordi	दोर्दी	Gandaki	Lamjung	16,050	350.93	
Dudhpokhari	दूधपोखरी	Gandaki	Lamjung	8,592	153.33	
Kwhola Sothar	क्व्होलासोथार	Gandaki	Lamjung	7,960	175.37	
Nason	नासोँ	Gandaki	Manang	1,671	709.58	
Manang Ngisyang	मनाङ डिस्याङ	Gandaki	Manang	1,595	694.63	
Chame	चामे	Gandaki	Manang	1,276	78.86	
Narpa Bhumi	नार्पा भूमी	Gandaki	Manang	396	837.54	
Gharapjhong	घरपझोङ	Gandaki	Mustang	3,712	316	
Thasang	थासाङ	Gandaki	Mustang	2,856	289	
Baragung Muktichhetra	बारागुङ मुक्तिक्षेत्र	Gandaki	Mustang	2,036	886	5
Lomanthang	लोमन्थाङ	Gandaki	Mustang	1,430	727	
Lo-Ghekar Damodarkunda	लो-घेकर दामोदरकुण्ड	Gandaki	Mustang	1,292	1,344	
Malika	मालिका	Gandaki	Myagdi	18,332	147	
Mangala	मंगला	Gandaki	Myagdi	14,688	89	
Raghuganga	रघुगंगा	Gandaki	Myagdi	14,114	379	
Dhaulagiri	धवलागिरी	Gandaki	Myagdi	12,616	1,037	
Annapurna	अन्नपुर्ण	Gandaki	Myagdi	12,323	556.41	
Binayi Triveni	विनयी त्रिवेणी	Gandaki	Nawalpur	38,370	267.13	
Hupsekot	हुप्सेकोट	Gandaki	Nawalpur	26,583	189.21	
Bulingtar	बुलिङटार	Gandaki	Nawalpur	14,637	147.68	
Baudikali	बौदीकाली	Gandaki	Nawalpur	11,338	91.87	
Jaljala	जलजला	Gandaki	Parbat	21,119	82.26	
Modi	मोदी	Gandaki	Parbat	18,794	143.6	
Paiyun	पैयूं	Gandaki	Parbat	12,725	42.65	
Bihadi	विहादी	Gandaki	Parbat	10,828	44.8	
Mahashila	महाशिला	Gandaki	Parbat	8,116	49.38	
Kaligandaki	कालीगण्डकी	Gandaki	Syangja	17,955	73.51	
Arjun Chaupari	अर्जुन चौपारी	Gandaki	Syangja	14,045	57.22	
Biruwa	विरुवा	Gandaki	Syangja	14,001	95.79	
Harinas	हरीनास	Gandaki	Syangja	13,191	87.48	
Aandhikhola	आँधीखोला	Gandaki	Syangja	13,094	69.61	
Phedikhola	फेदीखोला	Gandaki	Syangja	10,899	56.73	
Myagde	म्याग्दे	Gandaki	Tanahun	23,578	115	
Aanbu Khaireni	आँबुखैरेनी	Gandaki	Tanahun	22,252	128	
Bandipur	बन्दिपुर	Gandaki	Tanahun	18,532	102	
Rhishing	ऋषिङ्ग	Gandaki	Tanahun	17,918	215	
Devghat	देवघाट	Gandaki	Tanahun	14,584	159	
Ghiring	घिरिङ	Gandaki	Tanahun	14,334	126	
Malarani	मालारानी	Lumbini	Arghakhanchi	24,150	101.06	
Panini	पाणिनी	Lumbini	Arghakhanchi	22,291	151.42	
Chhatradev	छत्रदेव	Lumbini	Arghakhanchi	21,611	87.62	
Baijanath	वैजनाथ	Lumbini	Banke	69,472	141.67	
Raptisonari	राप्ती सोनारी	Lumbini	Banke	66,445	1,041.73	
Khajura	खजुरा	Lumbini	Banke	62,789	101.91	
Janaki	जानकी	Lumbini	Banke	46,141	63.32	
Duduwa	डुडुवा	Lumbini	Banke	43,206	91.1	
Narainapur	नरैनापुर	Lumbini	Banke	43,135	172.34	
Badhaiyatal	बढैयाताल	Lumbini	Bardiya	52,818	115.19	
Geruwa	गेरुवा	Lumbini	Bardiya	33,514	78.41	
Rapti	राप्ती	Lumbini	Dang	52,123	161.07	
Gadhawa	गढवा	Lumbini	Dang	45,898	358.57	
Babai	बबई	Lumbini	Dang	30,968	257.48	
Rajpur	राजपुर	Lumbini	Dang	28,346	577.33	
Shantinagar	शान्तिनगर	Lumbini	Dang	27,641	116.02	
Dangisharan	दंगीशरण	Lumbini	Dang	23,668	110.7	
Banglachuli	वंगलाचुली	Lumbini	Dang	22,373	245.14	
Malika	मालिका	Lumbini	Gulmi	20,075	92.49	
Madane	मदाने	Lumbini	Gulmi	20,022	94.52	
Satyawati	सत्यवती	Lumbini	Gulmi	19,473	115.92	
Chhatrakot	छत्रकोट	Lumbini	Gulmi	19,357	87.01	
Gulmi Darbar	गुल्मीदरवार	Lumbini	Gulmi	19,296	79.99	
Dhurkot	धुर्कोट	Lumbini	Gulmi	18,814	86.32	
Chandrakot	चन्द्रकोट	Lumbini	Gulmi	18,662	105.73	
Isma	ईस्मा	Lumbini	Gulmi	18,529	81.88	
Ruru Kshetra	रुरु	Lumbini	Gulmi	16,597	67.38	
Kaligandaki	कालीगण्डकी	Lumbini	Gulmi	15,044	101.04	
Mayadevi	मायादेवी	Lumbini	Kapilvastu	55,972	88.53	
Suddhodhan	शुद्धोधन	Lumbini	Kapilvastu	52,861	91.69	
Yasodhara	यसोधरा	Lumbini	Kapilvastu	44,900	67.56	
Bijaynagar	विजयनगर	Lumbini	Kapilvastu	43,291	173.19	
Pratappur	प्रतापपुर	Lumbini	Parasi	49,897	87.55	
Sarawal	सरावल	Lumbini	Parasi	42,207	73.19	
Susta	त्रिवेणी सुस्ता	Lumbini	Parasi	40,655	112.17	
Palhinandan	पाल्हीनन्दन	Lumbini	Parasi	38,186	44.67	
Mathagadhi	माथागढी	Lumbini	Palpa	24,053	215.49	
Rainadevi Chhahara	रैनादेवी छहरा	Lumbini	Palpa	23,149	175.88	
Bagnaskali	वगनासकाली	Lumbini	Palpa	18,497	84.17	
Nisdi	निस्दी	Lumbini	Palpa	18,120	194.5	
Tinau	तिनाउ	Lumbini	Palpa	17,777	202	
Rambha	रम्भा	Lumbini	Palpa	17,155	94.12	
Purbakhola	पूर्वखोला	Lumbini	Palpa	16,052	138.05	
Ribdikot	रिब्दीकोट	Lumbini	Palpa	15,473	124.55	
Naubahini	नौबहिनी	Lumbini	Pyuthan	32,682	213.41	
Jhimruk	झिमरुक	Lumbini	Pyuthan	26,130	106.93	
Gaumukhi	गौमुखी	Lumbini	Pyuthan	25,980	139.04	
Airawati	ऐरावती	Lumbini	Pyuthan	20,428	156.75	
Sarumarani	सरुमारानी	Lumbini	Pyuthan	19,783	157.97	
Mandavi	माण्डवी	Lumbini	Pyuthan	15,863	113.08	
Mallarani	मल्लरानी	Lumbini	Pyuthan	15,646	80.09	
Sunilsmriti	सुनिलस्मृति	Lumbini	Rolpa	30,617	156.55	
Runtigadhi	रुन्टीगढी	Lumbini	Rolpa	28,291	232.69	
Lungri	लुङ्ग्री	Lumbini	Rolpa	26,325	135.23	
Triveni	त्रिवेणी	Lumbini	Rolpa	23,412	205.39	
Paribartan	परिवर्तन	Lumbini	Rolpa	21,671	163.01	
Gangadev	गंगादेव	Lumbini	Rolpa	21,503	124.38	
Madi	माडी	Lumbini	Rolpa	18,056	129.05	
Sunchhahari	सुनछहरी	Lumbini	Rolpa	17,241	277.62	
Thabang	थवाङ	Lumbini	Rolpa	10,851	191.07	
Bhume	भूमे	Lumbini	Eastern Rukum	19,829	273.67	
Sisne	सिस्ने	Lumbini	Eastern Rukum	18,534	327.12	
Putha Uttarganga	पुठा उत्तरगंगा	Lumbini	Eastern Rukum	18,308	560.34	
Mayadevi	मायादेवी	Lumbini	Rupandehi	56,170	72.44	
Gaidhawa	गैडहवा	Lumbini	Rupandehi	56,149	96.79	
Kotahimai	कोटहीमाई	Lumbini	Rupandehi	45,975	58.26	
Siyari	सियारी	Lumbini	Rupandehi	44,985	66.17	
Rohini	रोहिणी	Lumbini	Rupandehi	43,327	64.32	
Sammarimai	सम्मरीमाई	Lumbini	Rupandehi	43,044	50.78	
Kanchan	कञ्चन	Lumbini	Rupandehi	42,528	58.51	
Shuddhodhan	शुद्धोधन	Lumbini	Rupandehi	41,907	57.66	
Omsatiya	ओमसतीया	Lumbini	Rupandehi	41,141	48.54	
Marchawarimai	मर्चवारीमाई	Lumbini	Rupandehi	40,880	48.55	
Gurans	गुराँस	Karnali	Dailekh	21,189	164.79	
Naumule	नौमुले	Karnali	Dailekh	19,687	228.59	
Bhairabi	भैरवी	Karnali	Dailekh	18,767	110.46	
Thantikandh	ठाँटीकाँध	Karnali	Dailekh	18,301	88.22	
Bhagawatimai	भगवतीमाई	Karnali	Dailekh	18,206	151.52	
Mahabu	महावु	Karnali	Dailekh	18,059	110.8	
Dungeshwar	डुंगेश्वर	Karnali	Dailekh	14,533	105.19	
Mudkechula	मुड्केचुला	Karnali	Dolpa	5,803	250.08	
Kaike	काईके	Karnali	Dolpa	3,965	466.6	
Shey Phoksundo	शे फोक्सुन्डो	Karnali	Dolpa	3,635	123.07	
Jagadulla	जगदुल्ला	Karnali	Dolpa	2,575	83.3	
Dolpo Buddha	डोल्पो बुद्ध	Karnali	Dolpa	2,420	377.38	
Chharka Tangsong	छार्का ताङसोङ	Karnali	Dolpa	1,672	345.57	
Simkot	सिमकोट	Karnali	Humla	11,935	785.89	
Sarkegad	सर्केगाड	Karnali	Humla	10,688	306.7	
Adanchuli	अदानचुली	Karnali	Humla	8,265	150.61	
Kharpunath	खार्पुनाथ	Karnali	Humla	6,736	880	
Chankheli	चंखेली	Karnali	Humla	6,579	1,310.41	
Tanjakot	ताँजाकोट	Karnali	Humla	6,092	159.1	
Namkha	नाम्खा	Karnali	Humla	3,589	2,419.64	
Junichande	जुनीचाँदे	Karnali	Jajarkot	23,771	346.21	
Kushe	कुसे	Karnali	Jajarkot	23,058	273.97	
Barekot	बारेकोट	Karnali	Jajarkot	22,005	577.5	
Shivalaya	शिवालय	Karnali	Jajarkot	14,776	134.26	
Patarasi	पातारासी	Karnali	Jumla	16,824	814.07	
Tatopani	तातोपानी	Karnali	Jumla	15,575	525.56	
Tila	तिला	Karnali	Jumla	14,539	175.49	
Kanaka Sundari	कनकासुन्दरी	Karnali	Jumla	13,625	225.39	
Sinja	सिंजा	Karnali	Jumla	12,556	153.29	
Hima	हिमा	Karnali	Jumla	12,191	132.32	
Guthichaur	गुठिचौर	Karnali	Jumla	10,922	427	
Narharinath	नरहरिनाथ	Karnali	Kalikot	22,458	143.86	
Palata	पलाता	Karnali	Kalikot	17,346	318.84	
Shubha Kalika	शुभ कालिका	Karnali	Kalikot	13,773	97.32	
Pachal Jharana	पचालझरना	Karnali	Kalikot	13,687	166.92	
Sanni Triveni	सान्नी त्रिवेणी	Karnali	Kalikot	13,491	136.71	
Mahawai	महावै	Karnali	Kalikot	8,177	322.07	
Khatyad	खत्याड	Karnali	Mugu	18,832	281.12	
Soru	सोरु	Karnali	Mugu	14,277	365.8	
Mugum Karmarong	मुगुम कार्मारोंग	Karnali	Mugu	6,222	2,106.91	
Sani Bheri	सानीभेरी	Karnali	Western Rukum	24,759	133.8	
Banphikot	बाँफिकोट	Karnali	Western Rukum	21,033	190.42	
Tribeni	त्रिवेणी	Karnali	Western Rukum	20,525	85.49	
Kumakh	कुमाख	Karnali	Salyan	24,859	177.28	
Kalimati	कालीमाटी	Karnali	Salyan	22,206	500.72	
Chhatreshwari	छत्रेश्वरी	Karnali	Salyan	21,242	150.69	
Darma	दार्मा	Karnali	Salyan	20,139	81.46	
Kapurkot	कपुरकोट	Karnali	Salyan	17,526	119.21	
Tribeni	त्रिवेणी	Karnali	Salyan	16,664	119.11	
Siddha Kumakh	सिद्ध कुमाख	Karnali	Salyan	13,127	89.36	
Chaukune	चौकुने	Karnali	Surkhet	26,950	381.01	
Barahatal	बराहताल	Karnali	Surkhet	25,943	455.09	
Simta	सिम्ता	Karnali	Surkhet	24,083	241.64	
Chingad	चिङ्गाड	Karnali	Surkhet	15,600	170.19	
Turmakhand	तुर्माखाँद	Sudurpashchim	Achham	24,574	232.07	
Ramaroshan	रामारोशन	Sudurpashchim	Achham	23,600	173.33	
Mellekh	मेल्लेख	Sudurpashchim	Achham	22,785	134.78	
Dhankari	ढँकारी	Sudurpashchim	Achham	21,998	227.88	
Chaurpati	चौरपाटी	Sudurpashchim	Achham	21,681	182.16	
Bannigadi Jayagad	बान्नीगडीजैगड	Sudurpashchim	Achham	13,519	58.26	
Dogada Kedar	दोगडाकेदार	Sudurpashchim	Baitadi	23,104	126.38	
Dilashaini	डिलाशैनी	Sudurpashchim	Baitadi	22,966	125.28	
Sigas	सिगास	Sudurpashchim	Baitadi	21,814	245.44	
Shivanath	शिवनाथ	Sudurpashchim	Baitadi	18,064	81.65	
Surnaya	सुर्नया	Sudurpashchim	Baitadi	17,945	124.52	
Pancheshwar	पञ्चेश्वर	Sudurpashchim	Baitadi	17,796	120.41	
Kedarsyu	केदारस्यु	Sudurpashchim	Bajhang	21,312	113.91	
Bitthadchir	बित्थडचिर	Sudurpashchim	Bajhang	17,812	86.15	
Thalara	थलारा	Sudurpashchim	Bajhang	15,958	105.51	
Chhabis Pathibhera	छब्बीसपाथिभेरा	Sudurpashchim	Bajhang	14,474	116.34	
Khaptad Chhanna	छान्ना	Sudurpashchim	Bajhang	13,419	113.52	
Masta	मष्टा	Sudurpashchim	Bajhang	13,265	109.24	
Talkot	तलकोट	Sudurpashchim	Bajhang	11,719	335.26	
Durgathali	दुर्गाथली	Sudurpashchim	Bajhang	11,318	61.83	
Surma	सुर्मा	Sudurpashchim	Bajhang	11,082	270.8	
Saipal	सइपाल	Sudurpashchim	Bajhang	2,625	1,467.27	
Khaptad Chhededaha	खप्तड छेडेदह	Sudurpashchim	Bajura	19,307	135.08	
Swami Kartik Khapar	स्वामिकार्तिक खापर	Sudurpashchim	Bajura	12,576	110.55	
Himali	हिमाली	Sudurpashchim	Bajura	10,309	830.33	
Jagannath	जगन्नाथ	Sudurpashchim	Bajura	10,158	171.72	
Gaumul	गौमुल	Sudurpashchim	Bajura	8,913	314.66	
Navadurga	नवदुर्गा	Sudurpashchim	Dadeldhura	18,672	141.89	
Aalitaal	आलिताल	Sudurpashchim	Dadeldhura	18,112	292.87	
Ajaymeru	अजयमेरु	Sudurpashchim	Dadeldhura	15,161	148.9	
Ganyapadhura	गन्यापधुरा	Sudurpashchim	Dadeldhura	13,722	135.65	
Bhageshwar	भागेश्वर	Sudurpashchim	Dadeldhura	13,132	233.38	
Malikarjun	मालिकार्जुन	Sudurpashchim	Darchula	15,635	100.82	
Naugad	नौगाड	Sudurpashchim	Darchula	15,528	180.27	
Marma	मार्मा	Sudurpashchim	Darchula	15,124	208.06	
Lekam	लेकम	Sudurpashchim	Darchula	13,743	83.98	
Duhun	दुहु	Sudurpashchim	Darchula	9,842	65.35	
Byans	ब्याँस	Sudurpashchim	Darchula	9,668	839.26	
Api Himal	अपि हिमाल	Sudurpashchim	Darchula	6,798	613.95	
Aadarsha	आदर्श	Sudurpashchim	Doti	24,495	128.47	
Purbichauki	पूर्वीचौकी	Sudurpashchim	Doti	21,494	117.66	
K.I. Singh	केआईसिंह	Sudurpashchim	Doti	20,736	127.01	
Sayal	सायल	Sudurpashchim	Doti	20,456	122.72	
Jorayal	जोरायल	Sudurpashchim	Doti	19,788	419.09	
Bogatan Phudsil	वोगटान–फुड्सिल	Sudurpashchim	Doti	15,540	300.22	
Badi Kedar	बड्डी केदार	Sudurpashchim	Doti	14,902	332.55	
Kailari	कैलारी	Sudurpashchim	Kailali	49,917	233.27	
Janaki	जानकी	Sudurpashchim	Kailali	49,860	107.27	
Bardagoriya	बर्गगोरिया	Sudurpashchim	Kailali	37,682	77.26	
Joshipur	जोशीपुर	Sudurpashchim	Kailali	37,187	65.57	
Chure	चुरे	Sudurpashchim	Kailali	21,400	493.18	
Mohanyal	मोहन्याल	Sudurpashchim	Kailali	21,082	626.95	
Laljhadi	लालझाँडी	Sudurpashchim	Kanchanpur	25,037	154.65	
Beldandi	बेलडाँडी	Sudurpashchim	Kanchanpur	21,888	36.7	

== See also ==
- Village development committee (VDCs)
- List of cities in Nepal
- Local self-government in Nepal
