= Lalikanda =

Coordinates: 28°42′N 81°48′E

Lalikhanda लालीखण्ड
- Village development committee
- Interactive map of Lalikhanda
- Country: Nepal
- Zone: Bheri Zone
- District: Dailekh District

Population (1991)
  - Total: 3,363
- Time zone: UTC+5:45 (Nepal Time)

Lalikhanda is a village development committee in Dailekh District in the Bheri Zone of western-central Nepal. At the time of the 1991 Nepal census it had a population of 3363 people living in 515 individual households.
