= Bada Bhairab =

Coordinates: 28°47′N 81°47′E

Bada Bhairab बडा भैरव
- Village development committee
- Interactive map of Bada Bhairab
- Country: Nepal
- Zone: Bheri Zone
- District: Dailekh District

Population (1991)
  - Total: 2,316
- Time zone: UTC+5:45 (Nepal Time)

Bada Bhairab is a village development committee in Dailekh District in the Bheri Zone of western-central Nepal. At the time of the 1991 Nepal census it had a population of 2316 people living in 419 individual households.
