= Gauri, Dailekh =

Coordinates: 28°46′N 81°40′E

Gauri, Nepal गौरी
- Village Development Committee
- Interactive map of Gauri, Nepal
- Country: Nepal
- Zone: Bheri Zone
- District: Dailekh District

Population (1991)
  - Total: 2,008
- Time zone: UTC+5:45 (Nepal Time)

Gauri is a Village Development Committee in Dailekh District in the Bheri Zone of western-central Nepal. At the time of the 1991 Nepal census it had a population of 2008 people residing in 390 individual households.
