= Tilepata =

Tilepata तिलेपाटा
- Village development committee
- Location in Nepal
- Coordinates: 29.03°N 81.48°E
- Country: Nepal
- Zone: Bheri Zone
- District: Dailekh District

Population (1991)
  - Total: 4,305
- Time zone: UTC+5:45 (Nepal Time)

Tilepata is a village development committee in Dailekh District in the Bheri Zone of western-central Nepal. At the time of the 1991 Nepal census it had a population of 4305 people living in 797 individual households.
