= Tolijaisi =

Tolijaisi तोलीजैसी
- Village development committee
- Interactive map of Tolijaisi
- Coordinates: 28.990°N 81.508°E
- Country: Nepal
- Zone: Bheri Zone
- District: Dailekh District

Population (1991)
  - Total: 3,596
- Time zone: UTC+5:45 (Nepal Time)

Tolijaisi is a village development committee in Dailekh District in the Bheri Zone of western-central Nepal. At the time of the 1991 Nepal census it had a population of 3596 people living in 627 individual households.
