= Malika, Dailekh =

Malika, Bheri मालिका
- Village development committee
- Location in Nepal
- Coordinates: 28.79°N 81.63°E
- Country: Nepal
- Zone: Bheri Zone
- District: Dailekh District

Population (1991)
  - Total: 4,245
- Time zone: UTC+5:45 (Nepal Time)

Malika, Bheri is a village development committee in Dailekh District in the Bheri Zone of western-central Nepal. At the time of the 1991 Nepal census it had a population of 4245 people living in 813 individual households.
