= Chamunda, Nepal =

Chamunda, Nepal चामुण्डा
- Village development committee
- Location in Nepal
- Coordinates: 28.96°N 81.58°E
- Country: Nepal
- Zone: Bheri Zone
- District: Dailekh District

Population (1991)
  - Total: 7,641
- Time zone: UTC+5:45 (Nepal Time)

Chamunda, Nepal is a village development committee in Dailekh District in the Bheri Zone of western-central Nepal. At the time of the 1991 Nepal census it had a population of 7641 people living in 1342 individual households.
