= Meheltoli =

Moheltoli मोहेलटोली
- Village development committee
- Location in Nepal
- Coordinates: 28.84°N 81.86°E
- Country: Nepal
- Zone: Bheri Zone
- District: Dailekh District

Population (1991)
  - Total: 1,877
- Time zone: UTC+5:45 (Nepal Time)

Moheltoli is a village development committee in Dailekh District in the Bheri Zone of western-central Nepal. At the time of the 1991 Nepal census it had a population of 1877 people living in 360 individual households.
