= Lakuri =

Lakuri लाँकुरी
- Village development committee
- Location in Nepal
- Coordinates: 28.77°N 81.73°E
- Country: Nepal
- Zone: Bheri Zone
- District: Dailekh District

Population (1991)
  - Total: 3,234
- Time zone: UTC+5:45 (Nepal Time)

Lakuri is a village development committee in Dailekh District in the Bheri Zone of western-central Nepal. At the time of the 1991 Nepal census it had a population of 3234 people living in 573 individual households.

== Media ==
To promote local culture, Lakuri has a community radio station, Radio Dhrubatara FM (Nepali: रेडियो ध्रुवतारा एफ एम; Nepali pronunciation: [reɖiyo dʱrubʌtara epʰ em]), which broadcasts at 89.8 MHz. Dhrubatara means "pole star".
