= Basantamala =

Basantamala बसन्तमाला
- Village development committee
- Country: Nepal
- Zone: Bheri Zone
- District: Dailekh District

Population (1991)
  - Total: 2,569
- Time zone: UTC+5:45 (Nepal Time)

Basantamala is a village development committee in Dailekh District in the Bheri Zone of western-central Nepal. At the time of the 1991 Nepal census it had a population of 2569 people living in 452 individual households.
