= Lyati Bindraseni =

Layati Bindrasaini लयाटी बिन्द्रासैनी
- Village development committee
- Location in Nepal
- Coordinates: 28.91°N 81.52°E
- Country: Nepal
- Zone: Bheri Zone
- District: Dailekh District

Population (1991)
  - Total: 4,780
- Time zone: UTC+5:45 (Nepal Time)

Lyati Bindraseni is a village development committee in Dailekh District in the Bheri Zone of western-central Nepal. At the time of the 1991 Nepal census, it had a population of 4780 people living in 936 individual households.

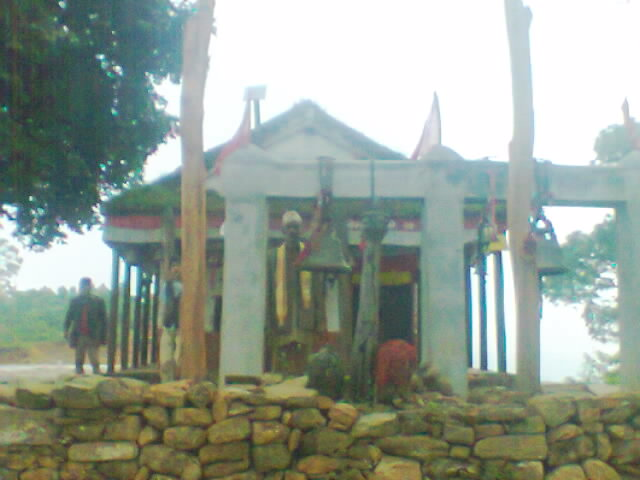
Vindrasaini temple
