= Sigaudi =

Sigaudi सिगौडी
- Village development committee
- Location in Nepal
- Coordinates: 29.00°N 81.45°E
- Country: Nepal
- Zone: Bheri Zone
- District: Dailekh District

Population (1991)
  - Total: 4,442
- Time zone: UTC+5:45 (Nepal Time)

Sigaudi is a village development committee in Dailekh District in the Bheri Zone of western-central Nepal. At the time of the 1991 Nepal census it had a population of 4442 people living in 821 individual households.
