= Kal Bhairab, Nepal =

Kal Bhairab, Nepal कालभैरव
- Village development committee
- Location in Nepal
- Coordinates: 28.81°N 81.66°E
- Country: Nepal
- Zone: Bheri Zone
- District: Dailekh District

Population (1991)
  - Total: 3,787
- Time zone: UTC+5:45 (Nepal Time)

Kal Bhairab is a village development committee in Dailekh District in the Bheri Zone of western-central Nepal. At the time of the 1991 Nepal census it had a population of 3787 people living in 713 individual households.

In Kal Bhairab there are two villages: Bhukahan and Toryan. In Bhukahan, Bhatu, Bhairabthan, Rumalthan, Amaldharaghara, Baradanda, and Okhaldhunga are famous places. In Torayan, Palta and Lamagada are famous places.
