= Seri, Dailekh =

Coordinates: 28°44′N 81°38′E

Seri, Nepal सेरी
- Village Development Committee
- Interactive map of Seri, Nepal
- Country: Nepal
- Zone: Bheri Zone
- District: Dailekh District

Population (1991)
  - Total: 1,692
- Time zone: UTC+5:45 (Nepal Time)

Seri (Nepali: सेरी) is a Village Development Committee in Dailekh District in the Bheri Zone of western-central Nepal. At the time of the 1991 Nepal census it had a population of 1692 people residing in 291 individual households.
