= Bisalla =

Bisalla बिसल्ला
- Village development committee
- Location in Nepal
- Country: Nepal
- Zone: Bheri Zone
- District: Dailekh District

Population (1991)
  - Total: 4,222
- Time zone: UTC+5:45 (Nepal Time)

Bisalla is a village development committee in Dailekh District in the Bheri Zone of western-central Nepal. At the time of the 1991 Nepal census it had a population of 4222 people living in 748 individual households.
