= Singasain =

Coordinates: 29°3′N 81°32′E

sinhasain सिंहासैन
- Village development committee
- Nickname: सिंहासैन गा.वि.स.
- Interactive map of sinhasain
- nepal: Nepal
- Zone: Bheri Zone
- District: Dailekh District
- Established: sinhasain

Population (1991)
  - Total: 3,702
- Time zone: UTC+5:45 (Nepal Time)

Singasain is a village development committee in Dailekh District in the Bheri Zone of western-central Nepal. At the time of the 1991 Nepal census it had a population of 3702 people living in 692 individual households.
