= Awal Parajul =

Awal Parajul अवल पराजुल
- Village development committee
- Location in Nepal
- Coordinates: 28.73°N 81.76°E
- Country: Nepal
- Province: Karnali Province
- District: Dailekh District

Population (1991)
  - Total: 3,114
- Time zone: UTC+5:45 (Nepal Time)

Awal Parajul is a village development committee in Dailekh District in the Bheri Zone of western-central Nepal. At the time of the 1991 Nepal census it had a population of 3114 people living in 513 individual households.
