= Kasikandh =

Kasikandh काशीकन्ध
- Village development committee
- Location in Nepal
- Coordinates: 28.99°N 81.69°E
- Country: Nepal
- Zone: Bheri Zone
- District: Dailekh District

Population (1991)
  - Total: 3,256
- Time zone: UTC+5:45 (Nepal Time)

Kasikandh is a village development committee in Dailekh District in the Bheri Zone of western-central Nepal. At the time of the 1991 Nepal census it had a population of 3256 people living in 555 individual households.
