= Bhawani =

Bhawani भवानी Bhawani Mata
- Village development committee
- Nickname: सहुबाडा
- Location in Nepal western part of nepal
- Coordinates: 28.93°N 81.75°E
- Country: Nepal
- Zone: Bheri Zone
- District: Dailekh District

Population (2011)
  - Total: 2,610
- Time zone: UTC+5:45 (Nepal Time)

Bhawani is a village development committee in Dailekh District in the Bheri Zone of western-central Nepal. At the time of the 1991 Nepal census it had a population of 1421 people living in 269 individual households. लोकल मान्छे
