= Goganpani, Dailekh =

Goganpani, Bheri गोगनपानी
- Village development committee
- Location in Nepal
- Coordinates: 28.70°N 81.67°E
- Country: Nepal
- Zone: Bheri Zone
- District: Dailekh District

Population (2001)
  - Total: 3,118
- Time zone: UTC+5:45 (Nepal Time)

Goganpani, Bheri is a village development committee in Dailekh District in the Bheri Zone of western-central Nepal. At the time of the 1991 Nepal census, it had a population of 2574 people living in 449 individual households.
