= Dailekh =

Dailekh दैलेख (Khalanga)
- Neighborhood (District Headquarters)
- Location in Nepal
- Coordinates: 28°50′15″N 81°42′28″E
- Country: Nepal
- Province: Karnali Province
- District: Dailekh District
- Municipality: Narayan

Population (1991)
  - Total: 3,596
- Time zone: UTC+5:45 (Nepal Time)

Dailekh (Nepali: दैलेख), locally known as Dailekh Bazar Narayan is a town and the headquarters of Dailekh District located in Karnali Province of Nepal. It was Incorporated to Narayan Municipality on 26 March 1997.

== Climate ==
Climate data for Dailekh, elevation 1,402 m (4,600 ft), (1976–2005)
Month	Jan	Feb	Mar	Apr	May	Jun	Jul	Aug	Sep	Oct	Nov	Dec	Year
Mean daily maximum °C (°F)	14.9 (58.8)	17.6 (63.7)	22.7 (72.9)	28.0 (82.4)	29.8 (85.6)	29.7 (85.5)	27.9 (82.2)	27.7 (81.9)	26.5 (79.7)	24.0 (75.2)	20.4 (68.7)	16.6 (61.9)	23.8 (74.9)
Mean daily minimum °C (°F)	5.2 (41.4)	7.2 (45.0)	10.9 (51.6)	15.0 (59.0)	17.0 (62.6)	18.4 (65.1)	18.8 (65.8)	18.5 (65.3)	16.6 (61.9)	12.9 (55.2)	9.6 (49.3)	6.5 (43.7)	13.1 (55.5)
Average precipitation mm (inches)	36.4 (1.43)	42.8 (1.69)	41.0 (1.61)	33.1 (1.30)	105.8 (4.17)	229.1 (9.02)	494.5 (19.47)	494.9 (19.48)	253.9 (10.00)	35.8 (1.41)	8.6 (0.34)	17.5 (0.69)	1,774.5 (69.86)
Source: Agricultural Extension in South Asia
