= Dwari =

Odhari ओढारी
- Village development committee
- Location in Nepal
- Coordinates: 28.95°N 81.84°E
- Country: Nepal
- Zone: Bheri Zone
- District: Dailekh District

Population (1991)
  - Total: 2,286
- Time zone: UTC+5:45 (Nepal Time)

Odhari is a village development committee in Dailekh District in the Bheri Zone of western-central Nepal. At the time of the 1991 Nepal census it had a population of 2286 people living in 368 individual households.
