= Gamaudi =

Gamaudi गमौडी
- Village development committee
- Location in Nepal
- Coordinates: 28.84°N 81.65°E
- Country: Nepal
- Province: Karnali Province
- District: Dailekh District

Population (1991)
  - Total: 2,948
- Time zone: UTC+5:45 (Nepal Time)

Gamaudi is a village development committee in Dailekh District in Karnali Province of western-central Nepal. At the time of the 1991 Nepal census it had a population of 2948 people living in 568 individual households.
