= Baluwatar, Dailekh =

Baluwatar, Bheri बालुवाटार
- Village development committee
- Location in Nepal
- Coordinates: 28.99°N 81.77°E
- Country: Nepal
- Zone: Bheri Zone
- District: Dailekh District

Population (1991)
  - Total: 2,633
- Time zone: UTC+5:45 (Nepal Time)

Baluwatar is a village development committee in Dailekh District in the Bheri Zone of western-central Nepal. At the time of the 1991 Nepal census, it had a population of 2633 people living in 433 individual households.
