= Toli, Dailekh =

Coordinates: 28°54′N 81°48′E

Toli टोली
- Village development committee
- Interactive map of Toli
- Country: Nepal
- Province: Karnali Province
- District: Dailekh District

Population (1991)
  - Total: 2,493
- Time zone: UTC+5:45 (Nepal Time)

Toli is a village development committee in Dailekh District in Karnali Province of western-central Nepal. At the time of the 1991 Nepal census it had a population of 2493 people living in 399 individual households.
