= Dailekh District =

District in Karnali Province, Nepal

Dailekh District दैलेख जिल्ला
- District
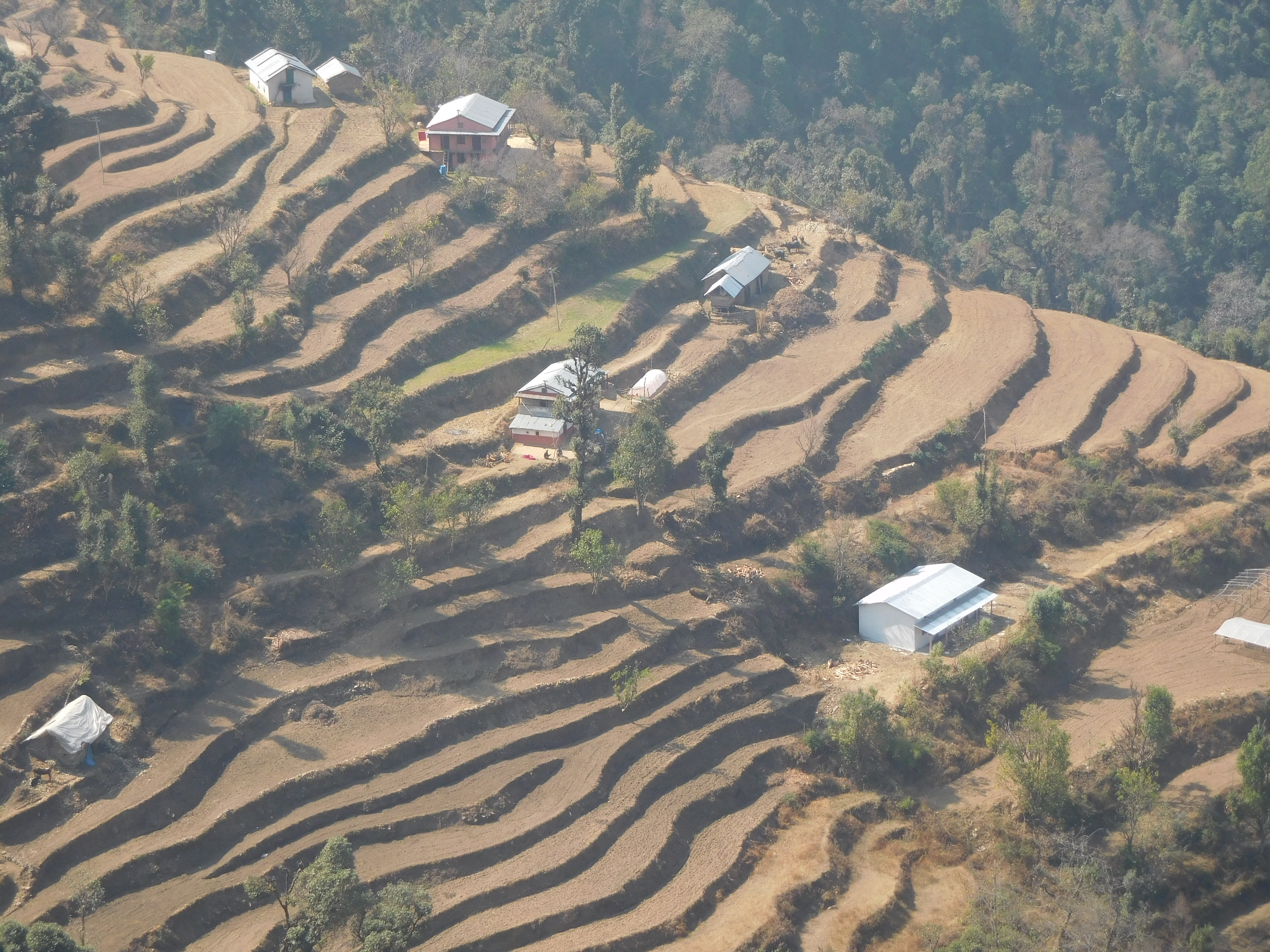
- View of fields in Guranshe

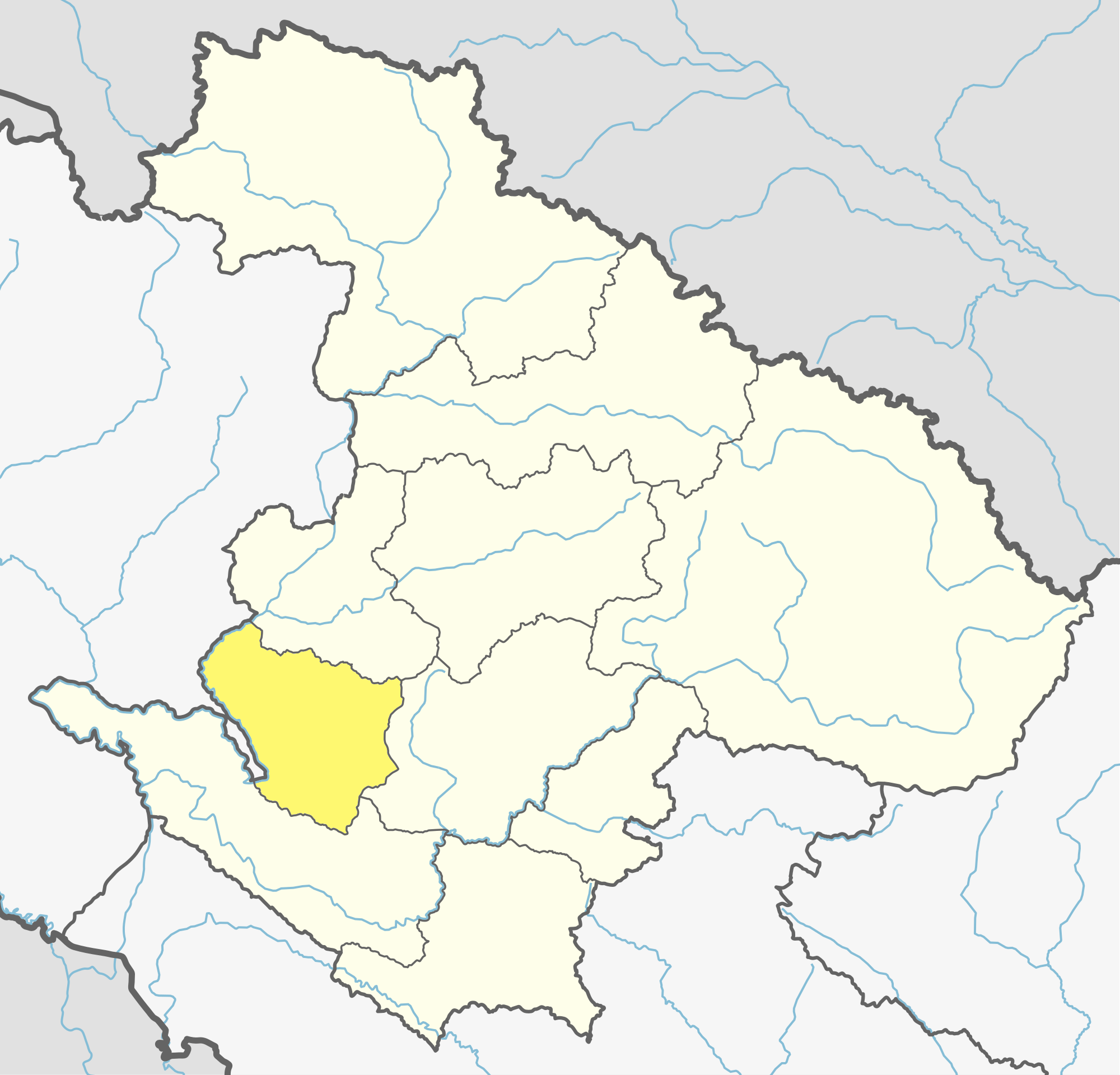
- Location of Dailekh District (dark yellow) in Karnali
- Coordinates: 28°50′15″N 81°42′28″E
- Country: Nepal
- Province: Karnali Province
- Admin HQ.: Dailekh (Narayan)
- Municipality: List: Urban; Narayan; Dullu; Aathbis; Chamunda Bindrasaini; Rural; Thantikandh; Bhairawi; Mahabu; Naumule; Dungeshwar; Gurans; Bhagawatimai

Government
  - Type: Coordination committee
  - Body: DCC, Dailekh
  - Head: Mr. Prem Bahadur Thapa
  - Parliamentary constituencies: 2 seats List: Dailekh 1; Dailekh 2
  - Provincial constituencies: 4 seats List: Dailekh 1(A); Dailekh 1(B); Dailekh 2(A); Dailekh 2 (B)

Area
  - Total: 1,505 km^{2} (581 sq mi)
- Highest elevation: 4,168 m (13,675 ft)
- Lowest elevation: 544 m (1,785 ft)

Population (2011)
  - Total: 260,855
  - Density: 173.3/km^{2} (448.9/sq mi)

Demographics
  - Ethnic groups: Chetri, Kami, Thakuri
  - Female ♀: 51%

Human Development Index
  - Literacy: 62%
- Time zone: UTC+05:45 (NPT)
- Postal Codes: 21600, 21602, 21603, 21604, 21605, 21607..., 21610
- Telephone Code: 089
- Main Language(s): Nepali
- Major highways: Mid-Hill (under cons.)
- Website: ddcdailekh.gov.np

Dailekh District (Nepali: दैलेख जिल्ला pronounced [dʌi̯lekʰ]) a part of Karnali Province, is one of the seventy-seven districts of Nepal. The district, with Dailekh as its district headquarters, covers an area of 1,502 km^{2} (580 sq mi) and had a population of 225,201 in 2001 and 261,770 in 2011.

== Etymology ==
It is said that the name Dailekh is derived from Dadhi Lekh. Dadhi stands for Dadhichi. Dadhichi was a sage in ancient time and Lekh mean hill. Etymologically ‘Dadhi Lekh’ means the hill where sage Dadhichi meditated. There is also another story about name that, in ancient time it was a place of Devatas, so it called "Daibalok" which later became 'Dailekh'.

== History ==
Dailekh District was a part of Khasa kingdom during 12th to 14th century. Sinja Valley was the ancient capital city and powerful town of the Khasa Kingdom After the fall down of the Khasa Kingdom it divided into many small kingdoms. Before the unification of modern Nepal, the area of the Karnali region had a united kingdom named Baise Rajya (twenty-two principalities). Dailekh principality was one of twenty-two principalities.

== Geography and climate ==
Dailekh is a high, hilly district out of ten districts of Karnali Province. It is situated at coordinates of 28° 35' 00" N to 29° 08' 00" N Latitudes and 81° 25' 00" E to 81° 53' 00" E of Longitudes. The lowest elevation is 544m and the highest elevation is 4,168m. The headquarter is situated at an elevation of 1448m. The district has covered 80% of mid-hill land and 21% of high-hill land. The total area of the district is 1,505 square kilometres (581 mi^{2}).

On the basis of altitude, this district can be classified into 4 different sub-categories:

Climate Zone	Elevation Range	% of Area
Upper Tropical	300 to 1,000 meters 1,000 to 3,300 ft.	16.7%
Subtropical	1,000 to 2,000 meters 3,300 to 6,600 ft.	64.5%
Temperate	2,000 to 3,000 meters 6,400 to 9,800 ft.	16.1%
Subalpine	3,000 to 5,500 meters 9,800 to 18,044 ft.	2.4%

== Transportation ==
Dailekh is connected with Birendranagar (the capital city of Karnali Province) with a road called Dailekh road (F-48). Dailekh road meets to Ratna Highway (NH-12) at Birendranagar (Surkhet). Ratna Highway is connected with Mahendra Highway (NH-1) at Kohalpur. Through Mahendra Highway one can get access to Kathmandu, Pokhara and other cities of Nepal.

There is another road connecting Dailekh to Karnali Highway (NH-13) via Dullu.

The national capital Kathmandu is at distance of 647.41 kilometres (402.28 mi) from Dailekh.

The nearest airport for Dailekh is Surkhet Airport which is about 70 kilometres (43 mi) at distance from Dailekh.

== Demographics ==
Historical population
Census year	Pop.	±% p.a.
1981	166,527	—
1991	187,400	+1.19%
2001	225,201	+1.85%
2011	261,770	+1.52%
2021	253,319	−0.33%
Source: Citypopulation

At the time of the 2021 Nepal census, Dailekh District had a population of 252,313. 10.62% of the population is under 5 years of age. It has a literacy rate of 75.50% and a sex ratio of 1089 females per 1000 males. 122,905 (48.71%) lived in municipalities.

Castes/ethnic groups in Dailekh district (2021)
1. Chhetri (35.3%)
2. Kami (19.6%)
3. Thakuri (13.8%)
4. Bahun (9.64%)
5. Magar (9.07%)
6. Damai (5.09%)
7. Sarki (3.03%)
8. Dasnami (1.21%)
9. Gurung (1.20%)
10. Other Hill Janjati (1.04%)
11. Others (1.00%)

Khas people make up a majority of the population with 88% of the population, while Khas Dalits make up 28% of the population. Hill Janjatis make up 11% of the population, of which Magars are 9% of the population.

Languages of Dailekh district (2021)
1. Nepali (95.9%)
2. Magar Dhut (2.96%)
3. Others (1.14%)

At the time of the 2021 census, 95.90% of the population spoke Nepali and 2.96% Magar Dhut as their first language. In 2011, 97.9% of the population spoke Nepali as their first language.

Religion in Dailekh District (2021)
Religion	Percent
Hinduism	95.91%
Buddhism	2.75%
Christianity	0.81%
Other or not stated	0.53%

== Constituency ==
Dailekh comprises 2 parliamentary seats and 4 provincial seats:

Constituency	Area	Seat	MP/MLA	Party
Dailekh 1	Narayan; Mahabu; Naumule; Bhagawatimai; Dungeshwar; Gurans			
Dailekh 2	Dullu; Chamunda Bindrasaini; Aathbiskot; Thantikandh; Bhairabi			
Dailekh 1(A)	Dungeshwar; Gurans; Bhagawatimai			
Dailekh 1(B)	Narayan; Mahabu; Naumule			
Dailekh 2(A)	Dullu; Bhairabi			
Dailekh 2(B)	Chamunda Bindrasaini; Aathbis; Thantikandh			

== Divisions of Dailekh ==
As per the new constitution of Nepal 2015, the district is divided into 4 urban municipalities and 7 rural municipality;

#	Municipality	Type	Area	Population	Website
1	Narayan	Urban	110.63	27,037	narayanmun.gov.np
2	Dullu	Urban	156.77	41,540	dullumun.gov.np
3	Aathbis	Urban	168	29,227	aathbismun.gov.np
4	Chamunda Bindrasaini	Urban	90.6	26,149	chamundabindrasainimun.gov.np
5	Thantikandh	Rural	88.22	18,896	thantikandhmun.gov.np
6	Bhairabi	Rural	110.46	21,233	bhairabimun.gov.np
7	Mahabu	Rural	110.8	19,277	mahabumun.gov.np
8	Naumule	Rural	228.59	20,802	naumulemun.gov.np
9	Dungeshwar	Rural	105.19	15,890	dungeshwormun.gov.np
10	Gurans	Rural	164.79	22,033	guransmun.gov.np
11	Bhagawatimai	Rural	151.52	18,778	bhagawatimaimun.gov.np
	Dailekh	District	1505	260,862	ddcdailekh.gov.np

=== Former VDCs and Municipalities ===
Awal Parajul; Bada Bhairab; Bada Khola; Badalamji; Baluwatar; Bansi; Baraha; Basantamala; Belaspur; Belpata; Bhawani; Bindhyabasini; Bisalla; Chamunda; Chauratha; Dada Parajul; Dullu; Gamaudi; Gauri; Goganpani	Jaganath; Jambukandh; Kal Bhairab; Kalika; Kasikandh; Katti; Khadkawada; Kharigera; Kusapani; Lakhandra; Lakuri; Lalikhanda; Lyati Bindraseni; Mairi Kalikathum; Malika; Meheltoli; Narayan Municipality; Naule Katuwal; Nepa; Nomule	Odhari; Padukasthan; Pagnath; Piladi; Pipalkot; Pusakot Chiudi; Rakam Karnali; Raniban; Rawalkot; Rum; Salleri; Sattalla; Saraswati; Seri; Sigaudi; Singasain; Tilepata; Tolijaisi; Toli

== Gallery ==
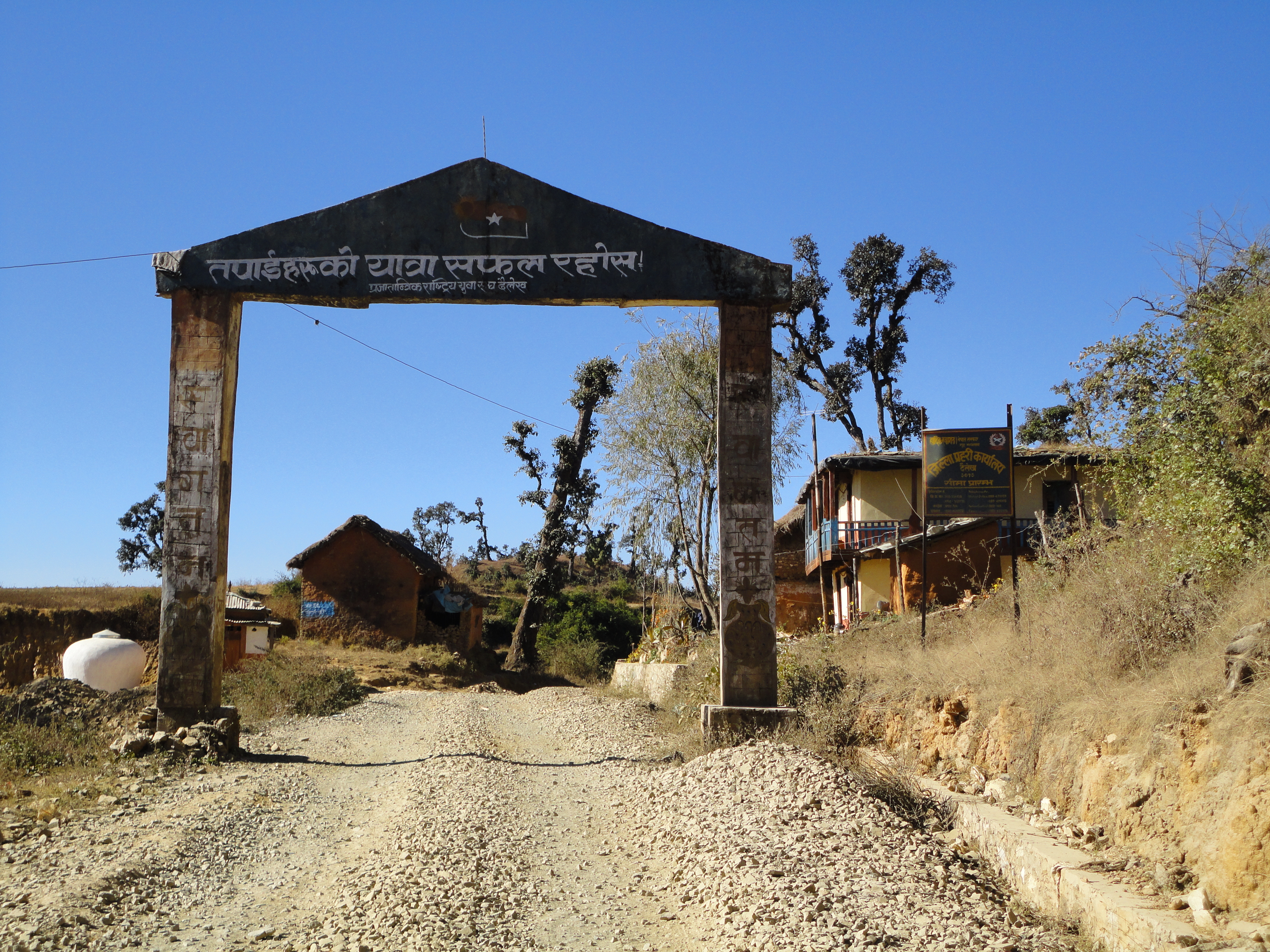
An entrance gate to Dailekh District in Ranimatta Mid-western Nepal

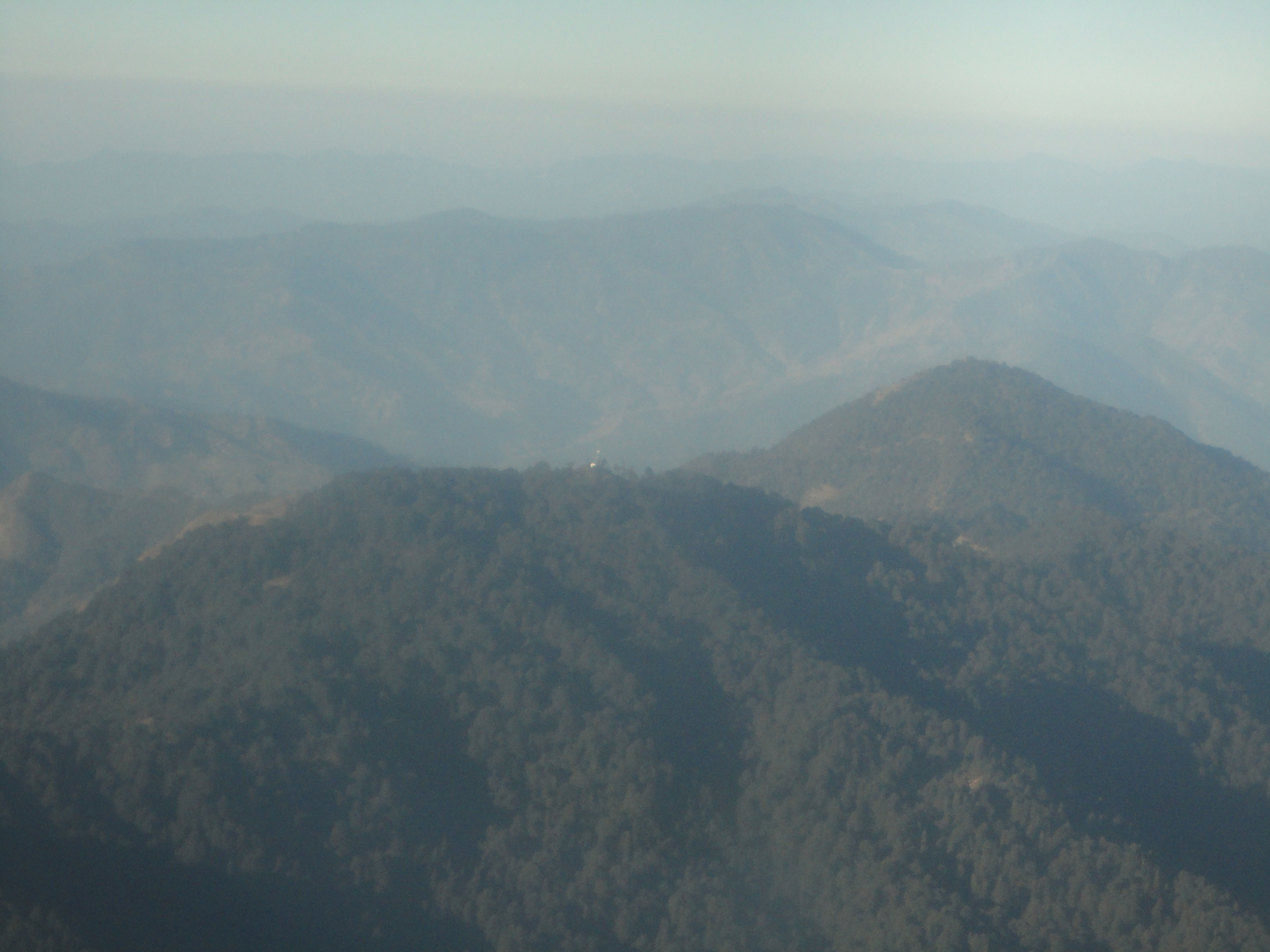
Aerial view of Dailekh District (Mid Western Nepal) on the way to Surkhet from Humla

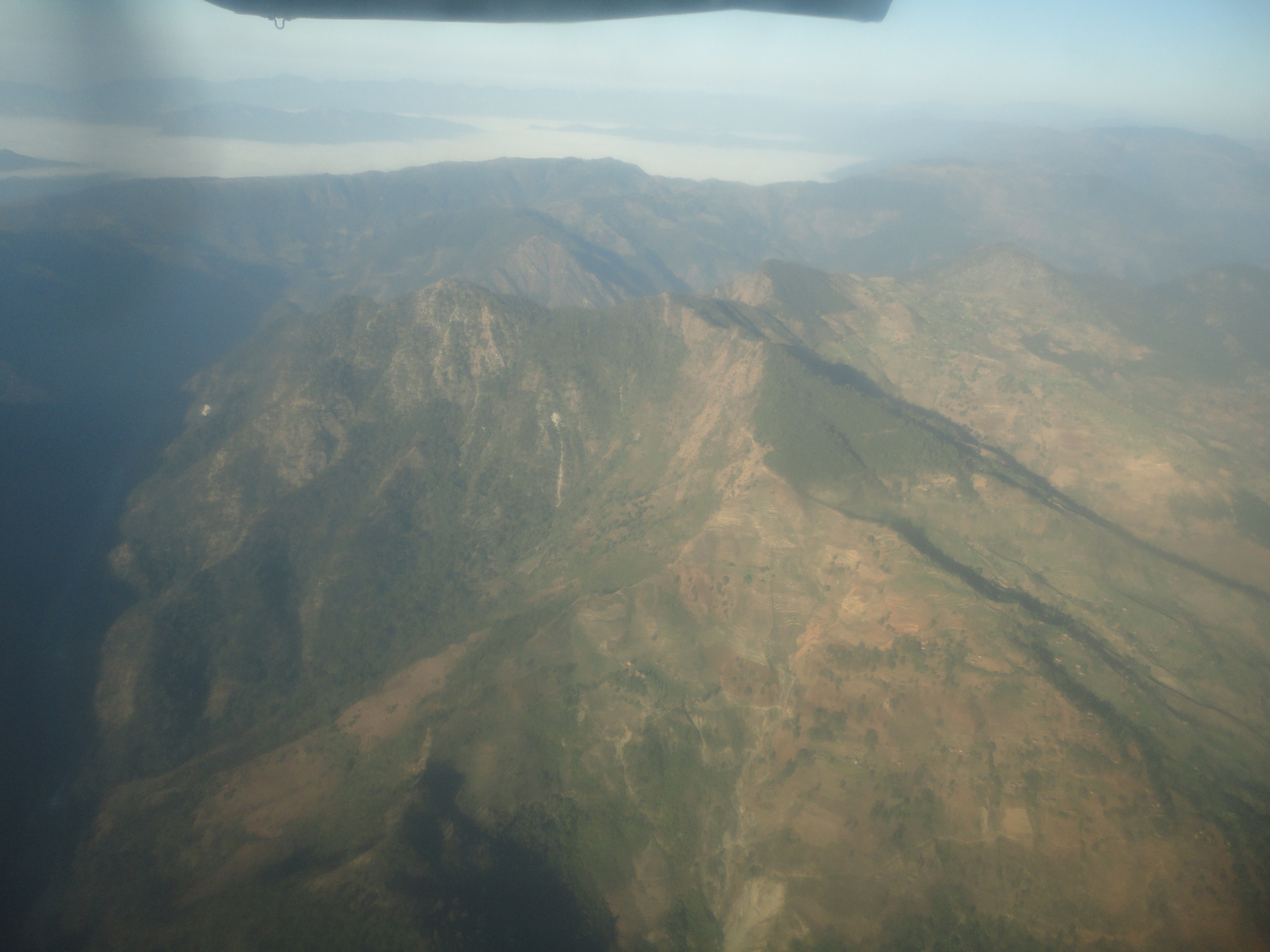
Aerial view of Dailekh District (Mid Western Nepal) on the way to Surkhet from Humla

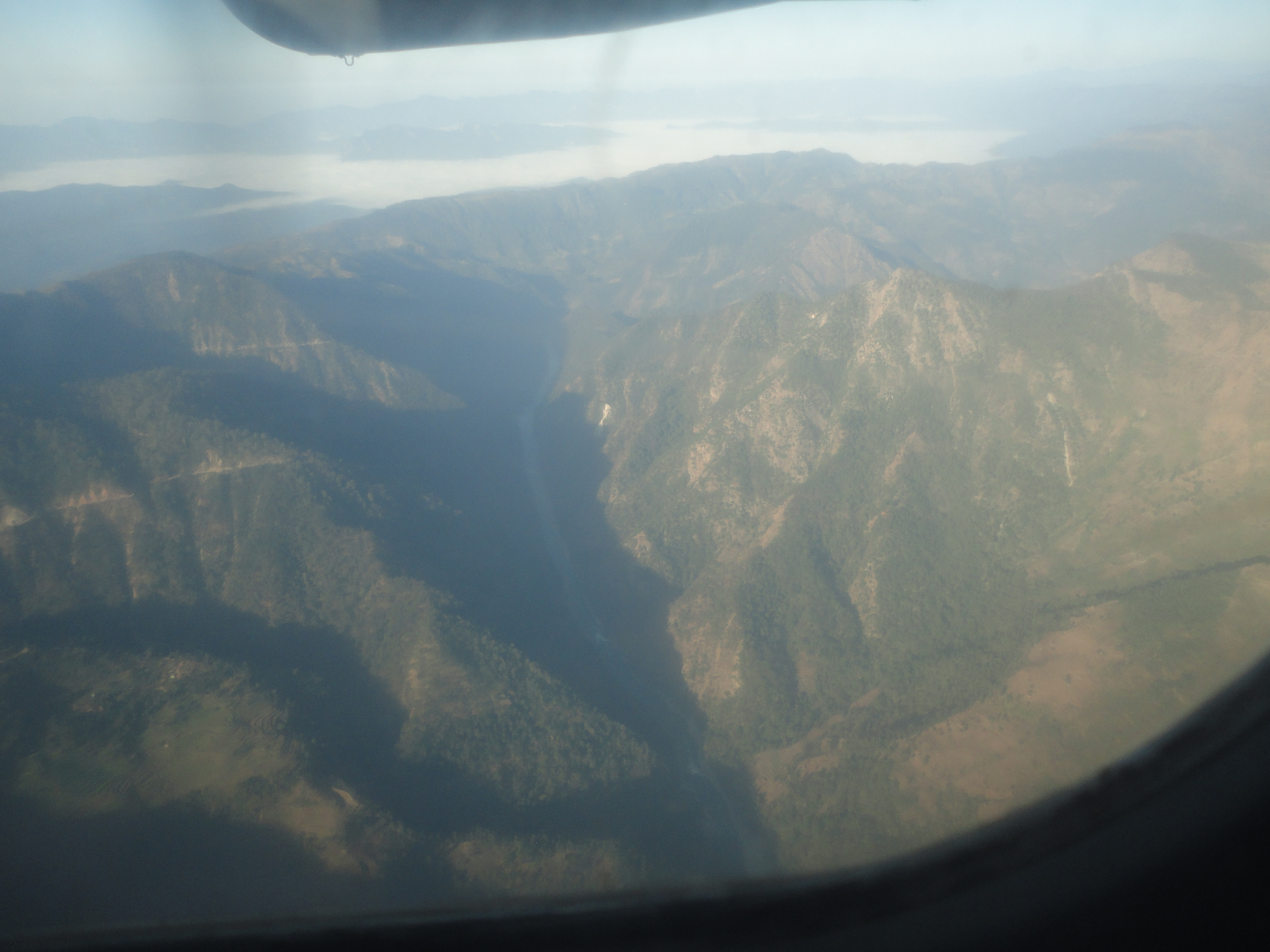
River Karnali, an aerial view of Dailekh District (Mid Western Nepal) on the way to Surkhet from Humla

== See also ==
- Zones of Nepal
- "Districts of Nepal". Statoids.
