= Thakuri =

Nepalese royal subcaste

ठकुरी

Regions with significant populations
- Nepal: 494,470 (1.7% of Nepal's population)

Languages
- Nepali

Religion
- Hinduism 99.20% (2011), Christianity 0.54% (2011)

Thakuri (Nepali: ठकुरी), meaning “master of the estate,” originally referred to ruling chieftains—many of Magar origin—across the ancient Magarat region, which later fragmented into the Baise (22) and Chaubisi (24) principalities. Over time, these Magar leaders were Sanskritized as high-caste Kshatriya, and their descendants, including branches of the Shah dynasty, came to be known collectively as Thakuri.

During the height of their influence, the Thakuri caste played a pivotal role in shaping the political landscape of Nepal. They held positions of authority and governance, contributing to the administration and stability of the region. Their lineage was highly regarded, and they were often sought after for leadership roles within the kingdom.

Notably, members of the Shah dynasty, which ruled Nepal for centuries, were descendants of the Khand Thakuri caste from Chaubisi. The Shah royal family held significant sway over Nepalese affairs, guiding the nation through various periods of prosperity and turmoil.

The Thakuris forged a legacy deeply rooted in Nepalese history. Their contributions to politics, culture, and society continue to be remembered and celebrated, reflecting their enduring impact on the nation.

== Etymology ==
Nepali sociologist Harka Bahadur Gurung noted that the Thakuri is the Nepalese version of the Hindi word Thakur which means 'master of the estate'. Thakuris of Nepal are also associated with some territory inherited from the days of Baisi and Chaubisi principalities and the term Thakurai actually refers to 'fiefdom'.

== Origins ==
The oldest texts available refer to Chhetris as 'Khasa' and Thakuris as Thakuris or Thakurs. It is, however, undeniable that a lot of Thakuris and Chhetris do hail from the same roots, a few centuries before the Baise Rajya era.

Thakuri come from diverse. In the Karnali and Sudurpaschim, Thakuris were mainly represented by powerful rulers from the Khas Malla kingdom, also known as the Khasa Kingdom, and the Chand kings who hailed from Kumaon Garhwal. These rulers expanded their kingdoms into areas like Bajhang and Darchula. The Karnali region, historically, was marked by influential kingdoms, especially the mighty Malla kingdom (or Khasa Kingdom), which held sway over a significant part of Gandaki Province. In specific places like the Kingdom of Bajhang, Bajura, and nearby areas, both Singh and Chand kings played crucial roles, extending their influence and establishing themselves as rulers in various parts of Sudurpashchim Province and the Karnali Province.

Additionally, there's a notable presence of other Thakuri castes such as Shahi, Shah, Bam, Malla, Singh, Chand and many more in these regions.

Meanwhile, in the Gandaki province (Anchal), there are Thakuri sub-castes like Sen, Malla Banshi/bamshi, Khand, and Shah/Shahi, and many more. Rulers in Gandaki region especially Magars rulers declared themself 'Thakuri' and changed their surnames to Thakuri, adopting names like Khand, (Shah of Gorkha) including (Sen Magar) who were ruler and many more. Both Magar and Khand Thakuri community worship kuldeuta or Kul-puja (ancestor worship) in Alamdevi Temple (Nepal's former Shah Kings' mother Goddess or family deity) in Syangja District where a Magar priest (Maski-Rana Magar) is mandated for worship.

Historically, they ruled over certain areas in the Baise regions, like Bajhang and nearby areas in the Baise Rajya. The debate over the attribution of Rajput descent has engaged historians, with some suggesting political motives behind such claims made by ruling families in Nepal. Mahesh Chandra Regmi highlights a historical trend where Nepalese ruling dynasties attempt to link their lineage with renowned Indian dynasties. This trend is exemplified by Thakuri Shah rulers, like King Ram Shah, who sought recognition of kinship relations with the Ranas of Udaypur.

Sen Thakuri and Magar communities continue their cultural traditions, such as Kul Pooja, in various regions of Nepal.

Despite their historical significance, the Khand Thakuri population remains relatively small today. Many members of this community have embraced the title Shahi Thakuri, aligning themselves with the broader Thakuri identity while preserving their historical roots. The Khand Thakuri's contributions to Nepal’s unification and governance remain an integral part of the nation’s history, highlighting their lasting influence in shaping Nepal’s monarchy and political development. Kingdom of Nuwakot

== Society ==
Various Thakuri sub-castes, such as Sen Banshi/Bamshi, Khand, Uchhai, Shah/Shahi are specifically prevalent in the Gandaki region. On the other hand, sub-castes like Chand, Shahi, Bam, Singh, and Pal are prominently found mainly in the Karnali region

== Demographics ==
Thakuris constitute the aristocracy and possess the high social, ritual and political status. Thakuris were historically politically and socially ahead of others. Traditionally, the Thakuris' main occupations involved government, agriculture and military. They traditionally constituted the ruling and warrior classes, and, except royal posts, share other administrative and military posts with the Chhetris.

The frequency of Thakuri was higher than national average (1.6%) in the following districts:

- Kalikot (25.1%)
- Humla (19.8%)
- Jajarkot (16.8%)
- Mugu (15.4%)
- Dailekh (14.1%)
- Jumla (7.4%)
- Baitadi (6.8%)
- Dolpa (6.4%)
- Kanchanpur (5.6%)
- Bajura (5.2%)
- Western Rukum (5.0%)
- Bajhang (4.9%)
- Darchula (4.9%)
- Surkhet (4.6%)
- Kailali (3.9%)
- Banke (3.6%)
- Doti (3.5%)
- Salyan (3.5%)
- Achham (2.5%)
- Dadeldhura (2.5%)
- Parbat (2.5%)
- Syangja (2.5%)
- Bardiya (2.3%)
- Tanahun (2.3%)
- Myagdi (2.0%)
- Nawalpur (1.8%)

== Thakuri family and dynasties ==
The ruling Shah dynasty of Gorkha Kingdom and other dynasties such as the Malla dynasty from Galkot later Kingdom of Nepal are ranked among Thakuris.

- Shah dynasty of Gorkha Kingdom

== Notable Thakuri surnames ==
In alphabetical order, the commonly known Thakuri surnames are:

- Bam
- Chand
- Khand/Khan
- Malla
- Pal
- Sen
- Shah
- Shahi
- Kalel/Kalyal (Shahi)
- Singh
- Thakuri
- Simha

Of these, Chand, Bam, Malla, and Pal are also associated with Kumaon/Kuramanchal kingdom.

== Famous Thakuri People ==
- Prithvi Narayan Shah
- Jaya Prithvi Bahadur Singh
- Kunwar Inderjit Singh
- Thirbam Malla
- Lokendra Bahadur Chand
- Gaurika Singh
- Dasrath Chand

== See also ==
- Baise Rajya (Twenty-Two Principalities)
- Chaubise Rajya(Twenty-Four Principalities)
- Khasa-Malla Kingdom
- Chand Kings
- Katyuri Kings
