= Bheri Zone =

Coordinates: 28°30′N 81°35′E

Bheri भेरी
- Zone
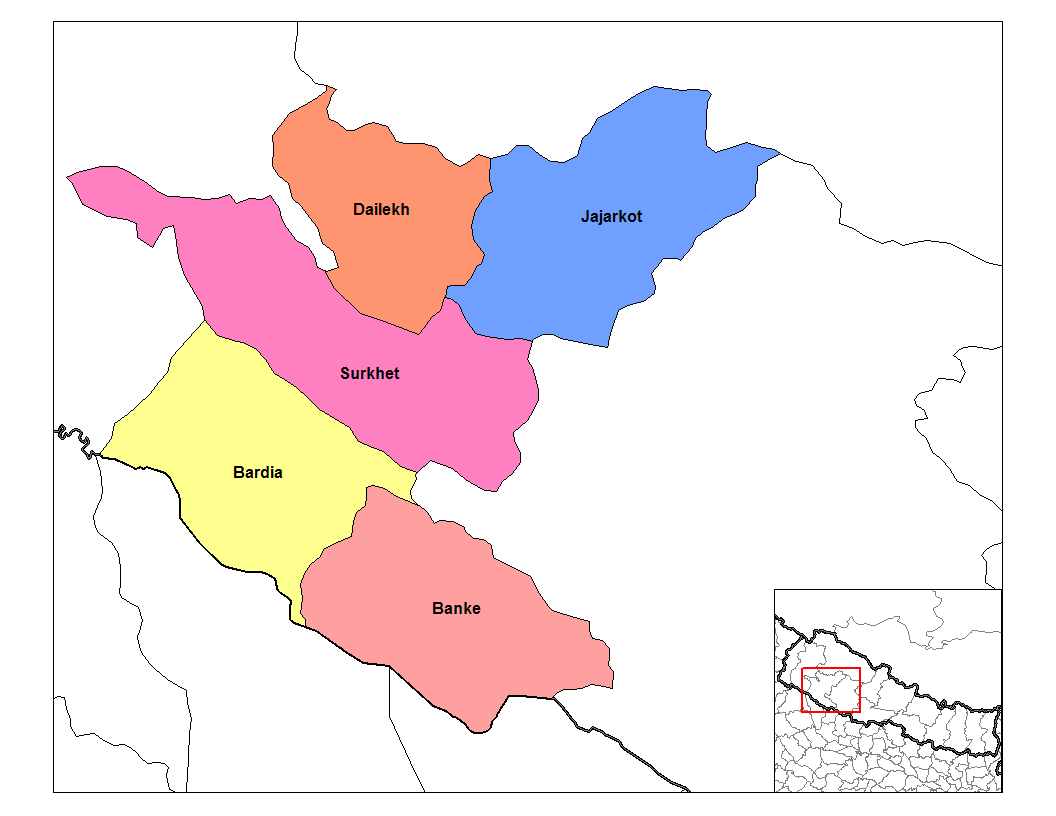
- Country: Nepal
- Named for: Bheri River
- Capital: Nepalgunj

Population (2011)
  - Total: 1,701,767
- Time zone: UTC+5:45 (Nepal Time)

Bheri Zone (Nepali: भेरी अञ्चल) was one of the fourteen zones located in the Mid-Western Development Region of Nepal. Nepalgunj were the administrative headquarters.

Cities and towns were Narayan, Jajarkot and Chhinchu in the "hills"; Nepalgunj, Gularia and Kohalpur in Terai; and Birendranagar in Surkhet Valley in the Inner Terai.

== Administrative subdivisions ==
Bheri was divided into five districts; since 2015 the three northern districts have been redesignated as part of Karnali Province, while the two southern districts have been redesignated as part of Lumbini Province.

District	Type	Headquarters	Since 2015 part of Province
Banke	Outer Terai	Nepalgunj	Lumbini Province
Bardiya	Outer Terai	Gularia	Lumbini Province
Dailekh	Hill	Khalanga	Karnali Province
Jajarkot	Hill	Jajarkot	Karnali Province
Surkhet	Inner Terai	Birendranagar	Karnali Province

== See also ==
- Development Regions of Nepal (Former)
- List of zones of Nepal (Former)
- List of districts of Nepal
