= List of Hindu temples in Nepal =

Char Dham, Nepal

This is a list of major Hindu temples in Nepal, alphabetically sorted by district.

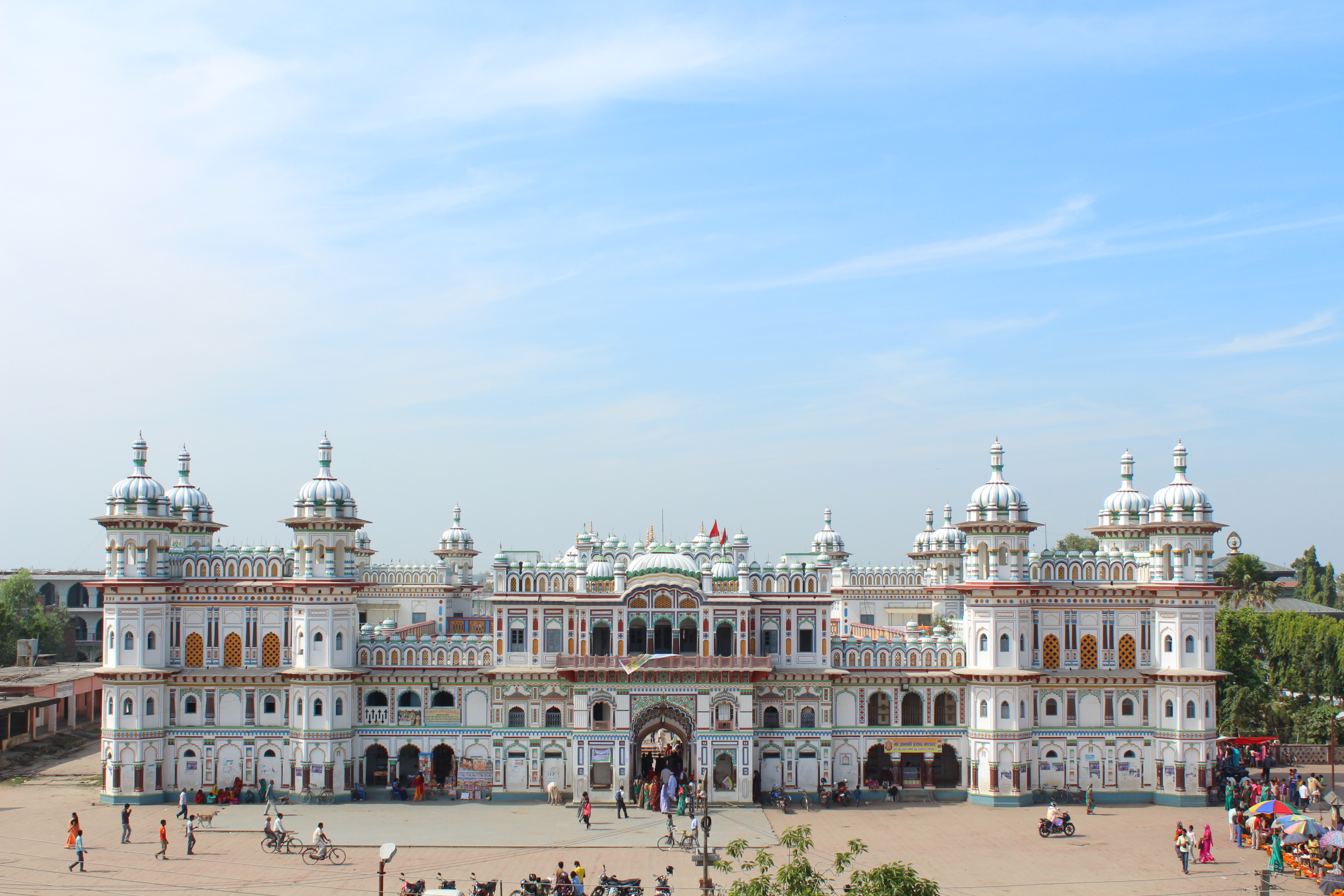
Janaki Mandir, Janakpur

== Arghakhachi District ==
- Aakashdevi Temple
- Supa Deurali Temple

== Bajura District ==
- Badimalika Temple (बडिमालिका मन्दिर)

== Banke ==
- Bageshwori Temple (Nepalgunj)

== Bara District ==
- Kankali Temple, Simraungadh
- Katghat Temple, Jitpursimara
- Ranivas Temple, Simraungadh
- Shree Ram Mandir, Nijgadh

== Baitadi District ==
- Tripura Sundari Temple
- Nagarjun Temple
- Gwallek Kedar Dham, Baitadi
- Ningalashaini Bhagawati Temple
- Melauli Bhagwati Mandir, Baitadi
- Jagannath Mandir

== Bhaktapur District ==
- Anantalingeshwor Mahadev
- Ashapuri Mahadev Temple
- Aananta lingeshwor Mahadev
- Balakhu Ganesh
- Balkumari temple, Bhaktapur, Thimi (बालकुमारी मन्दिर)
- Balkumari Dyochhen (बालकुमारी धोँ छेँ)
- Barahi Dyochhen (बाराही धोँ छेँ)
- Bhadrakali Dyochhen (भद्रकाली धोँ छेँ)
- Bhairav Temple (भैरव मन्दिर)
- Brahmayani Dyochhen (बम्ह्रायणी धोँ छेँ)
- Changu Narayan (चांगुनारायण मन्दिर)
- Chhonga Ganesh
- Chhuma Ganesh
- Dakshin Barahi Temple, Thimi (दक्षिण बाराही मन्दिर)
- Dattatraya Temple (दत्तात्रय मन्दिर)
- Doleshwor Mahadeva Temple (डोलेश्वर महादेव मन्दिर)
- Indrayani Dyochhen (इन्द्रायणी धोँ छेँ)
- Jalbinayak Temple (जलविनायक मन्दिर)
- Kailashnath Mahadev Statue,
- Kumari Dyochhen (कुमारी धोँ छेँ)
- Lhasapasa Saraswoti Temple
- Mahalaxmi Temple, Bode (महालक्ष्मी मन्दिर)
- Maheshowri Dyochhen (महेश्वरी धोँ छेँ)
- Matshya Narayan
- Neel Barahi Temple, Bode (नील बाराही मन्दिर)
- Nyatapola (न्यातपोल)
- Phashi Temple (फसी देग् मन्दिर)
- Siddhibinayak Temple (सिद्धिविनायक मन्दिर)
- SiddhiGanesh Temple (सिद्धिगणेश मन्दिर)
- Shiddi Laxmi
- Suryavinayak Temple (सूर्यविनायक मन्दिर)
- Suwarneshwor Manadev
- Siddhikali Temple, Thimi (सिद्धिकाली मन्दिर)
- Taleju Temple (तलेजु)
- Thalbinayak Temple (थलविनायक मन्दिर)
- Tripura Sundari Dyochhen (त्रिपुरासुन्दरी धोँ छेँ)
- Vatsala Durga Temple (वत्सला दुर्गा मन्दिर)
- WakuPati Narayan Temple (वाकुपति नारायण मन्दिर)
- Yaksheshwor Mahadeva Temple (यश्रश्वर महादेव मन्दिर)

== Biratnagar ==
- Ashta Chiranjeevi Mandir, Madhumaraa
- Bagalamukhi Mandir, Bagalamukhi
- Banaskhandi Shiva Mandir, Devkota Chowk
- Birateshwar Shiva Mandir, Main Road
- Durga Mandir, Pichhara
- Ganesh Mandir, Hospital Chowk
- Geeta Mandir, Haatkhola
- Hanuman Mandir, Budhahaat Chowk
- Hanuman Mandir, Teenpaini
- Kali Mandir, Main Road
- Radha Krishna Mandir, Panee Tanki
- Radha Raman Mandir, Bargachhi
- Ram Janaki Mandir, Thakurbari Road
- Shani Mandir, Hanumandas Road
- Shiva Mandir, Malaya Road

== Birendranagar ==
- Deutibajy Mandir (देउती बज्यै मन्दिर)
- Kakrebihar Mandir (काक्रेविहार मन्दिर)
- Ugratara Mandir
- Gathal Mandhir

== Birgunj ==
- Mahavir Mandir
- Maisthan Mandir
- Gita Mandir
- Surya Mandir

== Chitwan District ==
- Devghat Mandir (देवघाट मन्दिर)
- Bageshwari Mandir (बागेस्वरी मन्दिर)
- Gansehthan Mandir (गणेशथान मन्दिर)
- Zakhadi Mai Mandir (जखडी माइ मन्दिर)
- Kalika Mandir (कालीका मन्दिर)
- Pasupatinath Mandir (पसुपतीनाथ मन्दिर)
- Rameshwar Mandir (रामेश्वर मन्दिर)

== Dadeldhura ==
- Ghatal Than
- Ugratara Amargadhi 8 Dadeldhura
- bhumiraj mandir
- Bhageshwor mandir
- Dageshwori mandir

== Dailekh ==
- Padukasthan
- Shreesthan
- Navisthan
- Kotila
- Dungeshwor Temple
- Dhuleshwor
- Belaspur Temple
- Thama Chaughera Maisthan
- Dewal
- Saatkhamba

== Dhankuta District ==
- Gokundeshwar Mahadev Mandir, Tallo Kopche
- Chintang Devi temple (Jalpadevi Temple)
- Narwadeshwar Mahadev Mandir, Sirwani
- Nishan Bhagawati Temple, Bich Bazaar
- Pathivara Devi Temple, Bhedetar
- Saraswati Mandir, Salleri Ban
- Shiva Panchayan Mandir (Bisranti Temple)
- Margathan, (Bihebari hatiya)

== Dhanusha District ==
- Janaki Mandir (जानकी मन्दिर)
- Ram Mandir (राम मन्दिर)
- Janak Mandir (जनक मन्दिर)
- Sankat Mochan Mandir (संकट मोचन मन्दिर)
- Shiva Mandir (शिव मन्दिर)
- Mahabir jhanda mandir (माहाबिर झणडा मन्दिर) (In Bhathihan Bazar)
- Bhola Baba Mandir, also known as Shree Sapteshwornath Mandir (in Kushmaha Satoshar)
- Dhanusha Dham Mandir (in Dhanusha Dham)
- Durga Bhawani Mandir (दुर्गा भवानी मन्दिर) (सबैला बजार,धनुषा)
- Shree Ram Janaki Mandir (श्री राम जानकी मन्दिर) (सबैला बजार, धनुषा)
- Hanuman Mandir (हनुमान मन्दिर) (हनुमान चौक, सबैला, धनुषा)
- Shree Radhakrishna Mandir (श्री राधाकृष्ण मन्दिर) (गोविन्दपुर, सबैला, धनुषा)

== Dharan ==
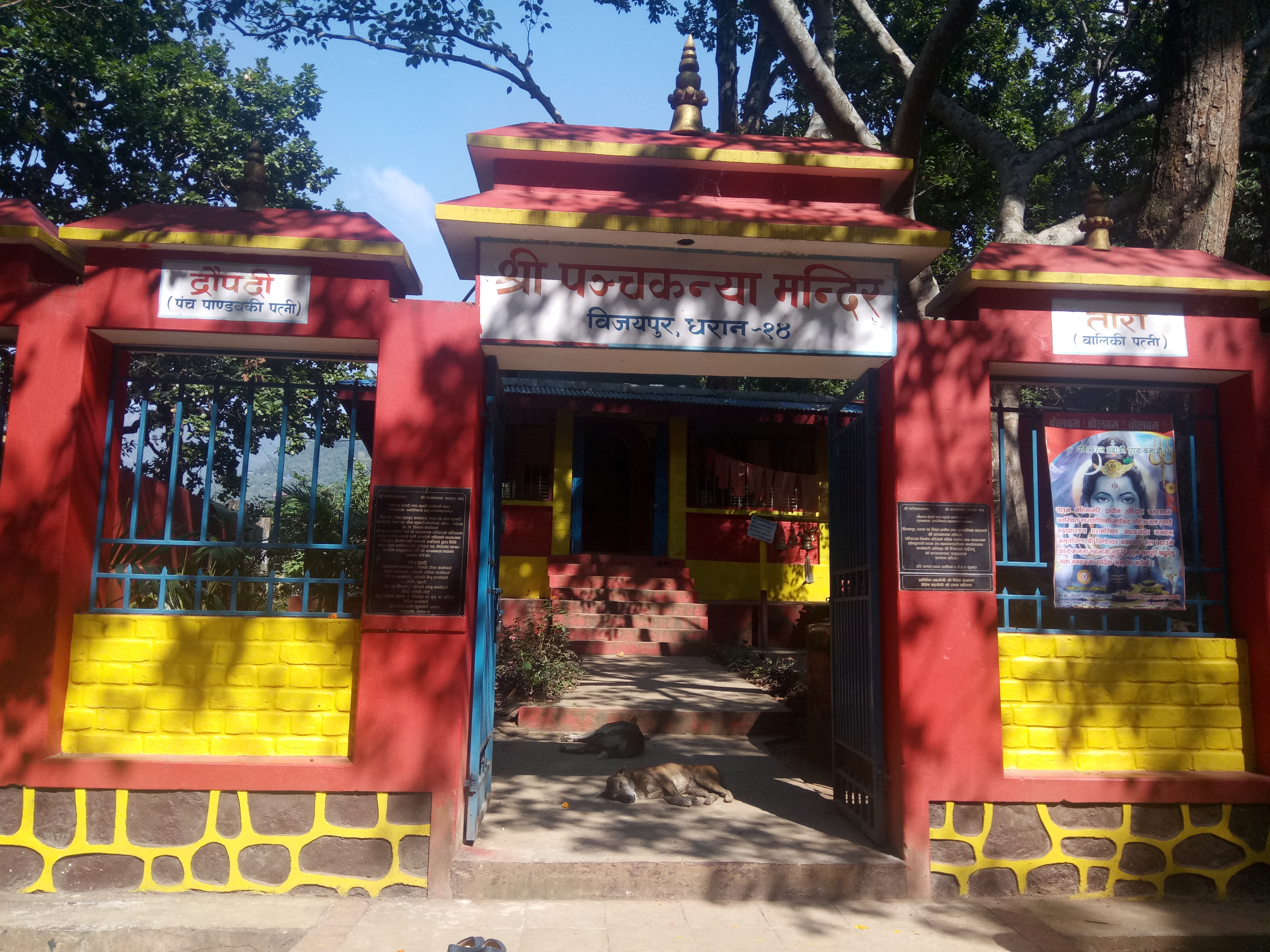
Panchakanya Temple

- Budha Subba Temple-(Dharan, Nepal)
- Dantakali Temple
- Bishnupaduka
- Pindeshwor Temple
- Panchakanya Temple
- Barahakshetra

== Dolpa ==
- Bala Tripura Sundari Temple

== Dolakha ==
- Dolakha Bhimsen Temple

== Darchula District ==
- Malikarjun Temple

== Gorkha District ==
- Manakamana Temple
- Gorkha Kalika (Gorkha Bazar)
- Akala Temple (Naharkee mains)

== Jhapa ==
- Kankai Mai
- Kichakbadh
- Satasidham
- Arjundhara
- Laxmi Narayan mandir, Charali

== Kanchanpur District ==
- Sidhhanath temple
- Linga Dham

== Kaski District ==
- Bhimkali Mandir (भिमकाली मन्दिर)
- Bindhyabasini temple (विन्धबासीनी मन्दिर)
- Tal Barahi Temple (तालबाराही मन्दिर)
- Dhodbarahi Mandir (Tanhu) (ढोडवाराही मन्दिर)
- Kalika Mandir' Kalikasthan, Kalika V.D.C.-4 (कालीका मन्दिर)
- Bhadrakali Temple भद्रकाली मन्दिर
- Sitaladevi Mandir
- Akala Devi Temple
- Mudula Karki Kulayan Mandir
- Kedareshwor Mahadev Temple
- Kumari Temple
- Kalika temple Mattikhan 15 km south from Pokhara
- Dhor Barahi Temple
- Narayansthan Temple
- Thulibidi Jhakri
- Nirajan Adhikari
- Phewa Taal Vitri Temple

== Kathmandu District ==
- Kageshwori Mahadev(कागेश्वरी महादेव मन्दिर If crow touch you have to visit)( कागेश्वरी महादेव मन्दिर)
- Koteshwor Mahadev (कोटेश्वर महादेव मन्दिर the patron deity of Nepal)
- Pashupatinath Temple (पशुपतिनाथ मन्दिर the patron deity of Nepal)
- Swayambhunath temple (स्वयम्भूनाथ मन्दिर worshipped by Buddhists and Hindus)
- Kasthamandap (काष्ठमण्डप the temple after which Kathmandu was named. It is also known as Gorakhnath Temple)
- Ashok Binayak Temple, Maru Tol (अशोक विनायक)
- Karyabinayak Temple (कार्यविनायक मन्दिर)
- Mahadev Parwati Temple (महादेव पार्वती मन्दिर), Kathmandu
- Degutaleju Temple (देगुतलेजु), Kathmandu
- Kumari Chhen (कुमारी छें the temple of living Goddess)
- Majipa Lakhey Chhen (मजिपाः लाखे छें the residence of Shanta Bhairab Majipa Lakhey)
- Jaishidewal (जैसीदेवल), Kathmandu
- Sapana Tirtha Temple Tokha, Kathmandu
- Chandeshwori Temple Tokha, Kathmandu
- Indreni Temple Bhutkhel, Tokha, Kathmandu
- Naradevi Temple (नरदेवी मन्दिर Swetakaali temple)
- Raktakali Temple (रक्तकाली मन्दिर)
- Pachali Bhairabh (पचली भैरव)
- Taleju Bhawani Temple (Kathmandu) (तलेजु भवानी)
- Shobha Bhagwati Mandir (शोभा भगवती मन्दिर)
- Bhadrakali Temple (Kathmandu) (भद्रकाली मन्दिर)
- Maitidevi Temple (मैतिदेवी मन्दिर)
- Bhairava Kal Bhairab (कालभैरव)
- Batuk Bhairab Temple (बटुक भैरव मन्दिर)
- Guhyeshwari Temple (गुह्येश्वरी मन्दिर)
- Bhagwatibahal Temple (भगवतीबहाल मन्दिर)
- Gyaneshwor Mahadev & Bhairavsthan (ज्ञानेश्वर महादेव र भैरवस्थान)
- Sankata (संकटा, पाःलाःद्यः), (Te Bahal, Newroad)
- Mahankal (महाकाल the deity is common in Hinduism and Buddhism)
- Chabahil Ganesh Temple (चाबहिल गणेश मन्दिर)
- Chamunda Devi Temple, Jorpati
- Akash Bhairav Temple (आकाश भैरव मन्दिर)
- Budhanilkantha Temple (बुद्धनीलकण्ठ मन्दिर)
- Sohrakhutte Ganesh (सोह्रखुट्टे गणेश)
- Sohrahate Ganesh (सोह्रहाते गणेश)
- Bhimsensthan (भीमसेनस्थान)
- Swet Bhairab Temple (श्वेत भैरव मन्दिर)
- Ganesh Temple (New Road) (गणेश मन्दिर)
- Ranamukteshwar Temple (रणमुक्तेश्वर मन्दिर), Pako Pukhuldhyang, New Road
- Ram Temple (Battisputali) (राम मन्दिर), Battisputali
- Pulukishi Chhen (पुलुकिसि छें the house of Airawat elephant, the Bahan of Indra, Kilagha
- Palanchowk Bhagwati (Hyumat) (पलांचोक भगवती)
- Bagbhairaw Temple (बाघभैरव मन्दिर)
- Asthanarayan Temple (अष्टनारायण मन्दिर)
- Dakshinkali Temple (दक्षिणकाली मन्दिर)
- Budanilkintha Temple (बुढानिलकण्ठ, भुइजःसि)
- Aadi nath temple (आदिनाथ लोकेश्वर, चोभाःद्यः)
- Bishnu Davi Temple (Bhajangal), Kirtipur
- Uma mahashwor Temple (उमामहेश्वर, नासः द्यः) (Kirtipur)
- Ses Narayan temple (Farping near Dakshinkali Temple)
- Taudaha nagraja (Chovar)
- Jal Binayak Temple (Chovar)
- Jwala Mai Temple (Tyouda, Ason), Kathmandu
- Jagannath Temple (Hanuman-Dhoka Durbar Square)
- Mahendreswor Temple (Hanuman-Dhoka Durbar Square)
- Trilokya Mohan Narayan Temple (Hanuman-Dhoka Durbar Square)
- Narayan Temple (Narayan Hiti Palace), Kathmandu
- Naxal Bhagawati (Bhagawati Bahal, Naxal), Kathmandu
- Shri Radha Madhava Temple (श्रीराधामाधव मन्दिर), Budhanilkantha, Kathmandu
- Gokarneshwor Mahadev Temple, Kathmandu
- Uttar Bahini Temple, Gokarneshwor, Kathmandu
- Swasthani mata temple, Sankhu, Kathmandu
- Bajrayogini Temple, Sankhu, Kathmandu
- Madhav Narayan Temple, Sankhu, Kathmandu
- Shree Nawatan Dham, Gothatar, Kathmandu
- Kirateshwor Mahadev Temple, Pashupatinath, Kathmandu
- Tundal Devi Temple, Hadigaun
- Tripureshwor Mahadev Temple, Tripureshwor, Kathmandu
- Kailashnath Mahadev Statue, Sanga

== Kavrepalanchowk District ==
- Chandeshwari Temple (चण्डेश्वरी मन्दिर)
- Dhaneshwor Temple (धनेश्वर)
- Bhagwati Temple (भगवती मन्दिर)
- Narayan Temple (नारायण मन्दिर)
- Mahadev Mandir (महादेव मन्दिर)
- Palanchok Bhagawati Temple (पलान्चोक भगवती)
- Astamatrika (अष्टमात्रिका‍ पनाैती)
- Unnmat Bhairab (उन्नमत्त भैरव पनाैती)
- Biseshor Mahadev (विशेश्वर महादेव पनाैती)
- Indreshor Mahdev (इन्देश्वर महादेव पनाैती)
- Indreswor Mandir, Panauti
- Gaukureshwor Temple, Dhulikhel
- GaneshTemple, Dhulikhel
- Shree Shwet Bhairav Temple Shreekhandapur

== Lalitpur District ==
- Bajra Barahi Temple (Bajra Barahi) (बज्र बाराहि)
- Balkumari Temple, Lalitpur
- Bangalamukhee Temple (बंगलामुखी मन्दिर)
- Batuk Bhairab (Lagankhel) (वटुक भैरव)
- Bhubaneswori Temple (Nakabahil) (भुवनेश्वरी)
- Bimsen Temple (Mangal Bazar) (भिमसेन)
- Bishankhu Narayan Temple (Sundhara) (बिशंखु नारायण)
- Bishwokarma (Ikhalukhu) (विश्वकर्मा)
- Chapat Ganesh Temple (Chapat) (चपट गणेश)
- Chamunda Temple (Patan) (चामुन्डा, सिगविलि)
- Chinnamasta (Mangal Bazar) (छिन्नमस्ता)
- Dhanawantari Barahi Temple (Jwagal) (धन्वन्तरी बाराहि)
- Govrateshwor Mahadev Temple (Luvu) (गेाभ्राट्रश्वर महादेव)
- Hayagriva Bhairava Temple (Bungamati)
- Jal Binayak (जल विनायक)
- Karya Binayak (कार्य विनायक)
- Kopeshwor Mahadev (Mangal Bazar) (केापेश्वर महादेव)
- Krishna Mandir (Patan) (कृष्ण मन्दिर)
- Kumari Chhen (Patan) (कुमारी छें)
- Kumbheshwar Temple (कुम्भेश्वर मन्दिर)
- Min Nath (Tangal) (चाकुवा ध्येा)
- Matangi (Mangal Bazar) (मातंगी)
- Manakamana (Patan) (मनकामना)
- Mani Keshav Narayan Temple (Swotha) (मणिकेशव नारायण)
- Mahabouddha Temple (Sundhara) (महावैाध्द)
- Mahalaxmi Temple (Lagankhel) (महालक्षमी)
- Santaneshwor Mahadev Temple (Bajra Barahi) (सन्तानेश्वर महादेव)
- Phulchowki Temple (Phulchowki) (फुलचेाकि)
- Rato Machhindra Nath Temple (Bungamati) (बुंग ध्येा)
- Rato Machhindra Nath Temple (Tangal) (बुंग ध्येा)
- Shwet Barahi Temple (Bandegaun) (श्वेतबाराहि)
- Siddhi Laxmi (Purnachandi) (सिदि लक्षमी)
- Taleju Mandir (Patan) (तलेजु मन्दिर)
- Tamak Dhyo (Jawalakhel) (तमकः ध्येा)
- Tika Bhairab (Lele) (टीका भैरव)
- Ram Mandir, Lamatar
- hanuman mandir

== Mahottari ==
- Jaleshwar Mahadev Temple

== Makawanpur ==
- Bhutandevi Temple
- Pashupatinath Temple
- Manakamana Temple
- Churiyamai Temple
- Banaskhandi Temple
- Bansagopal Temple
- Pathivara Temple
- Kusmanda Sarowar Triveni Dham

== Nawalparasi ==
- Daunne Devi Temple (दाउन्ने देबी मन्दिर)
- Maula Kalika Temple (मौला कालिका मन्दिर)
- Triveni Dham
- Sri Laxmi-Narasimha Divya Dham (Only Divya Desham in Nepal along with Muktinath Temple)
- Sri Laxmi-Hari Mandir
- Sri Radha-Krishna Madir (Nimbarka Kendra - Vrindawan Pratik)
- Sri Laxmi Venkatesh Mandir (Ved Vidya Ashram)
- Durga Mandir (Bardaghat)

== Palpa ==
- Bhairabsthan Temple
- Siddha Baba Temple

== Parsa ==
- Parasnath Temple (Nepal)

== Rasuwa ==
- Betrawati, the Uttar Gaya

== Rukum ==
- Digresaikumari bhagawati, Tharpu

== Rupendehi District ==
- Bolbam Dham, Parroha
- Siyabhar mandir, Suddhodhan -3 (Pharsatikar)

== Saptari District ==
- Chinnamasta Bhagawati Temple, Sakhda
- Kankalini Temple, Bhardah
- Rajdevi Temple, Rajbiraj
- Shambhunath Temple, Sambhunath
- Chandi Bhagawati Temple, Rajbiraj
- Baishnawi Kali Temple, Rajbiraj
- Bageshwari Temple, Rajbiraj
- Radha Krishna Temple, Rajbiraj
- Krishna Mandir, Rajbiraj
- Harinandeshwor Mahadev Mandir, Rajbiraj
- Balaji Devsthan Hanuman Mandir, Rajbiraj
- Dakneshwori Temple, Pato
- Bishnu Mandir, Rupnagar
- Ram Mandir, Rajbiraj
- Krishnaram Marauti, Agnisair
- Dinabhadri, Kataiya
- Sani Dham, Terhauta
- Hanuman Mandir, Hanumannagar

== Sinduplachowk ==
- Listi devi mandir
- Gaurati Bhimsen Temple
- Kshama devi mandir
- Bankali Mandir Gorsu
- Sutkeri Dhunga Gorsu

== Tanahun ==
- Aakala devi
- Andhimul Temple
- Bindebasini Temple, Bandipur
- Chhabdi Barahi Mandir
- Dhor Barahi Mandir
- Khadgamai Temple, Bandipur
- Shiva Mandir, Teendhara, Bandipur
- Shivalaya Mandir, Bandipur-3, Seratar
- Thanimai temple

== Taplejung ==
- Pathibhara Devi Temple (Teplejung)

== Tehrathum ==
- Singha Bahini Temple
- Siddhadevi temple
- Jal Kanya Devi Temple
- Pancha Kanya Devi

== Other Districts ==
Sri Nrsimha Dham Kshetra, Salyantar, Dhading (Jagannath Foundation-SRPV)

- Gadhimai Temple
- Muktinath Temple (मुक्तीनाथ मन्दिर)
- Chandannath Temple (Jumla) (चन्दननाथ मन्दिर)
- Narayanthan
- Kirateshwor Mahadev
- Lalita Devi Mandir
- Kalinchwork Bhagwati Mandir (Dolakha)
- Chanya Chatra - Syangja
- Tauleshwarnath Mandir - Kapilvastu
- Kalika Bhagawati Temple (Baglung)
- Jalkeshwor Mahadev - (Pattharkot, Sarlahi)
- Baidyanath Dham (Achham)
