= Dungeshwor Temple =

Hindu temple in Nepal

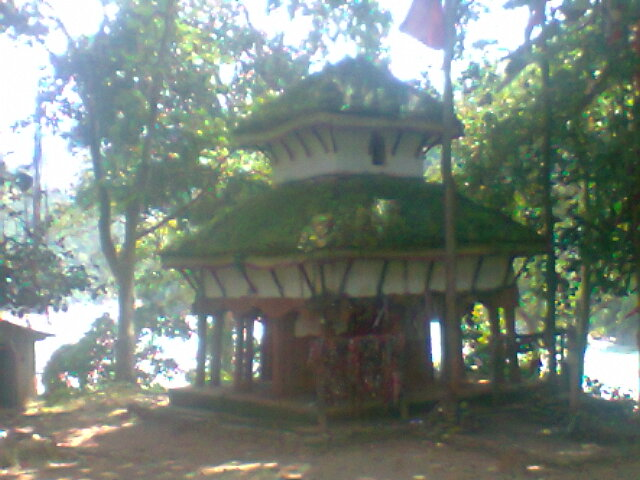
- Sidheshwor Mahadev Temple

- Dungeshwor Temple in Nepal

Religion
- Affiliation: Hinduism
- District: Dailekh
- Deity: Shiva
- Festival: Bada Dashain

Location
- Location: Naule Katuwal, Dullu Municipality
- State: Bheri
- Country: Nepal
- Interactive map of Dungeshwor Temple
- Coordinates: 28.78°N 81.58°E

Architecture
- Type: Pagoda Style

Specifications
- Temple: 2
- Inscriptions: Written in Stone
- Elevation: 544 m (1,785 ft)

Dungeshwor Temple (Nepali: डुङ्गेश्वर मन्दिर) is one of religious affairs in Dailekh district in Karnali Province. This place is located in Lower Dungeshwor, the highest place in Dailekh district. This places is located in the confluence of Loohre and Karnali river, at the level of 544 meters from the sea level. In ancient times, here is believed to be the end of the day. There are two temples by Shideshwor Mahadev and Dungal Temple in Dungeshwor. According to Ancient holy flame myth and Vaishwankar myth of Dailakh district, this area is considered to be a place in the center of five famous Panchkoshi, five in Dailekh district. Because of these diverse reasons it is considered to be a mantle. This bridge is currently located in the village of Naule Katuwal connected to Dullu Municipality. This campusphere is located near the Karnali highway in Karnali river and Larkakhola's turbulence. Interesting historical context has been popular about the predecessor of this loop. Dailekh has two places named Lower Dhungeshwor and Upper Dhungeshwor.

== Establishment ==
According to myth, a Brahmin named Jyotikha Upadhyay had been traveling daily from the house daily while completing Panchali and Lohar Sangam in Panangli and Lohar, after completing the Hindu rituals and Santana and entering the cave. In this cave, he used to be involved in Shiva's worship and meditation, chastisement and after returning to his own house, have seen some disability in the hands of Brahmin. Even though his health condition was weak, despite the continuation, in 1935, he met a saint named Sagar Giri on the banks of Karnali river. So he requested Sagar Giri to continue this worship because it is not possible cause of his disability. After accepting the request of the Brahmin, the young man of Giri Thar, brought the Shivaling, established the temple and became the new lord of divine power. Then devotees and kings together with the protection of the temple made Damaha, Slogan, and idol for worshiping in the temple. Then slowly the temple's rise also increased.

== Building the temple ==
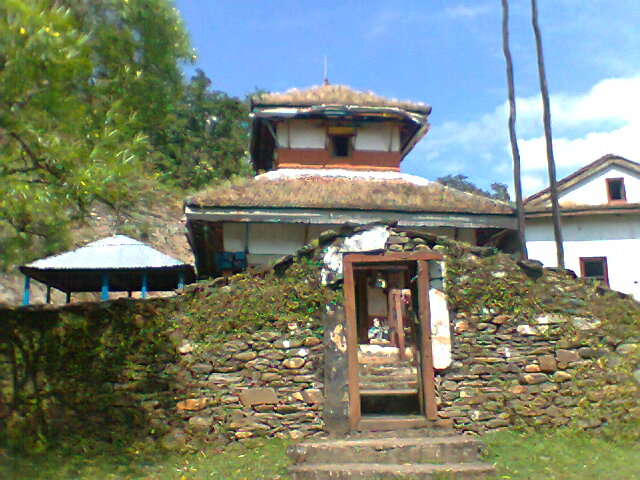
Dhungel Temple, Dungeshwor

The temple's sequence of worship started taking over the area. After some times, the two sisters Ganga and Jamuna of Dhungta from Achham district came to this place with the intention of worshiping God without getting married. Seeing their involvement, Sagar Giri handled the temple to them residing Himalayas as an eternal life. Because of the worship and taking care of this temple, they started calling as "Devaki", meaning goddess. Only then, the order of worshiping Devi's hands went to this place. And the number of deviates also increased. Afterwards, the then king Prithvi Narayan Shah picked up Damaha, Nagara and symbol in this temple was taken to Hanuman Dhoka, Kathmandu, and was conquered by his gangs. At the time of worshiping at Sidheshwor Mahadev in the morning, the dormitory kept in Hanumanhoka has started itself. In 1960 BS, when the Damaha, Nagara and symbol was returned to Sidheshwor Mahadev temple, they offered two hope programs including the pillar of the temple. In this context, an official from Kathmandu, who proposed to marry the Ganga and Jamuna, was worshiping in the temple. Devi Ganga made the temple of Siddheshwar Mahadev if he had a condition to marry her officials, and the officer made a covenant with the Ganga and fulfilled the promise. Similarly, In 1961 BS, one Khatri of Nepa village married Jamuna by promising to build the temple of Dhungel Mahadev. Khatri also built the temple of Dhungel Mahadev following his promise. In 1961 BS, Saint Sagar Giri of this temple died and Narottam Giri operated a parade of Sideshwor Temple. The cord of being saint was also recovered from his father and then started.

== Recent priests and saints ==
After the death of Narottam Giri, Kabiraj Giri (B.S. 1980), Khagendra Giri (B.S. 1998), Jaydev Giri (B.S. 2007), Sundar Giri (B. S. 2030), Choura Giri (B. S. 2034), Choura Giri's wife, Ranga Giri (B.S. 2040), Choura Giri's son Sukdev Giri (B.S. 2043) and since 2054, Khadga Giri has been taking charge of Mahant.

Similarly Siddheshwar Mahadev, Kalika Bhagwati, Ganeshji, Kalsaini Bhariab, Batuk Bharab and other gods and goddesses in this temple have been handled and worshiped by this crew, however, due to the controversy on being head of the temple, during Kabiraj Giri's period there was no provision of regulations in worship. During that period someone unknown saint called Lamsal, started to worship but he was cursed and started to suffer. And then he gave up. After that Chhadunge Brahman and Lasmal Brahman have too gave up because of suffering. After 2036 BS, the offspring of Jyotikhar Upadhaya, Bishnu Prasad Upadhya has been operating the worship of the temple till now.

== Tradition to worship ==
There is a belief that this temple's natural holy flame is connected to the vessel of the navel, and need to fire any other holy lights. If failed, could be reason to suffer of dishonor, drought, famine, and hunger. The temple of Sidheshwor Mahadev is merely opening at the day of Vijayadashmi. From the day of great degradation of Dashain (i.e. Ghatasathapana), the temple is given legitimate offerings along with religious sounds and music and are immersed on the day of Vijayadashmi. In the temple, the hope template is written as "श्री ५ पृथ्वीवीरविक्रम शाहदेव विक्रम संवत १९६०", meaning "His Highness Prithivi Bir Bikram Shah Dev Bikram Samvat 1960" and "वि.सं. १९८१", meaning (B.S. 1981) and "वि. सं. १९८९", meaning (B.S. 1989) on two consecutive large bells. There is a Shivaing in the temple. Similarly, Trishula, Axe and sword in the temple are worshiped as symbol of Goddess Bhagwati.

== See also ==
- List of Hindu temples in Nepal
