= Ashok Binayak Temple =

Hindu temple in Nepal

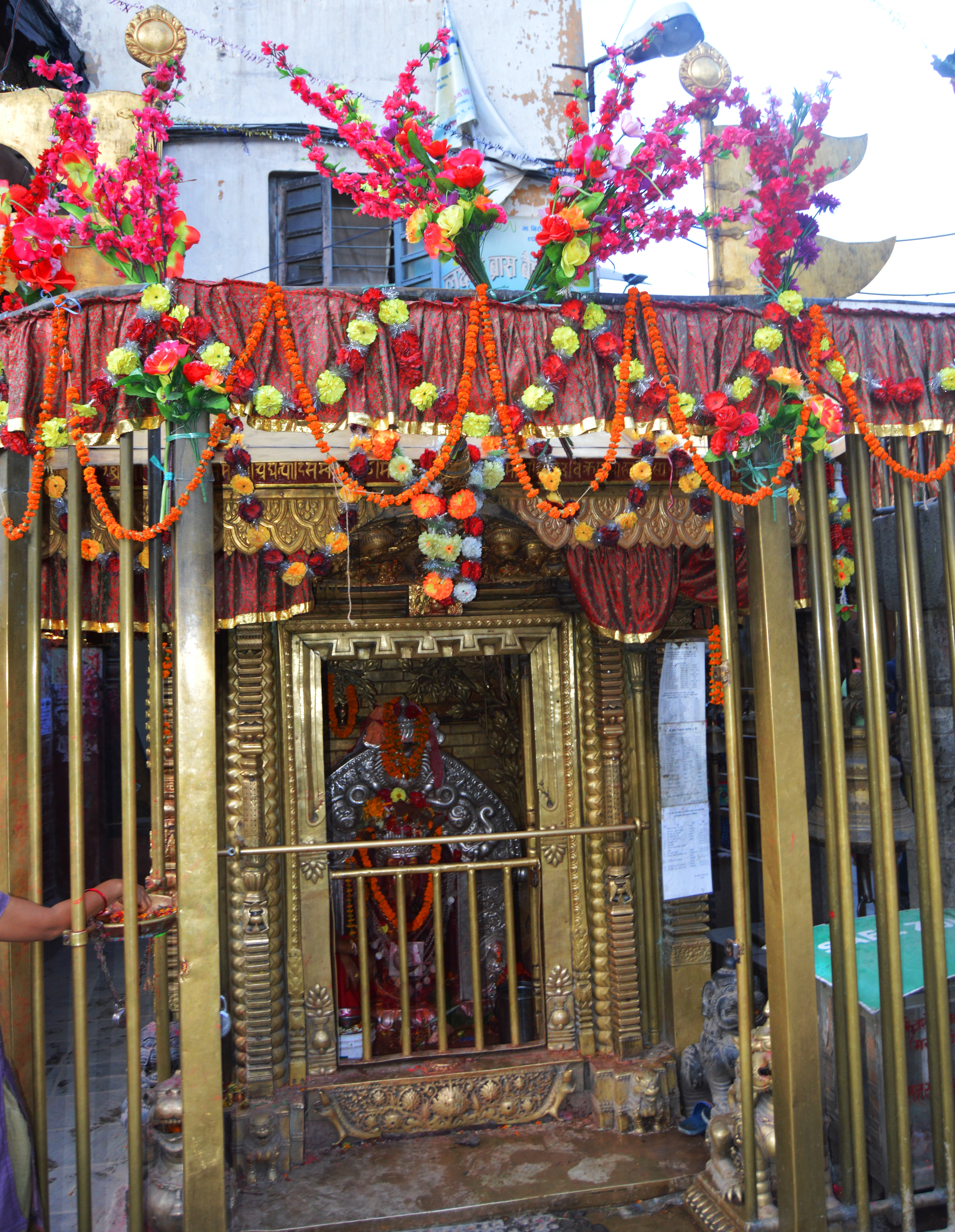
- A view of Ashok Binayak Temple.

- Location of Ashok Binayak Temple in Nepal.

Religion
- Affiliation: Hinduism
- District: Kathmandu
- Deity: Ganesh The God Ganesh

Location
- Location: Maru Tole, Kathmandu, Nepal
- Country: Nepal
- Coordinates: 26.7286°N 85.9247°E

Architecture
- Type: Pagoda
- Completed: Unknown; Modified around 1850 A.D

Ashok Binayak (अशोक विनायक) is a Hindu temple located in Kathmandu district at eastern side of Kathmandu Durbar Square in Maru Tole. This temple is of Lord Ganesha also known as Binayak. The god is worshipped as the god of luck by Hindus. The temple hosts one of the four original Ganesh shrines of Kathmandu valley. It is a popular place of worship for Hindus.It is worshipped both by Hindus and Buddhists. The temple is visited during Tuesdays every week as it is the day which is considered the day of Ganesh.

== History ==
Ashok Vinayak is one of the four original Ganesh of Kathmandu valley. The other three Ganesh shrines being Chandra Binayak, Surya Binayak and Jal Binayak. Additionally, there are other Ganesh temples like Kamal Binayak and Karya Binayak which are also popular Ganesh temples situated inside the valley.

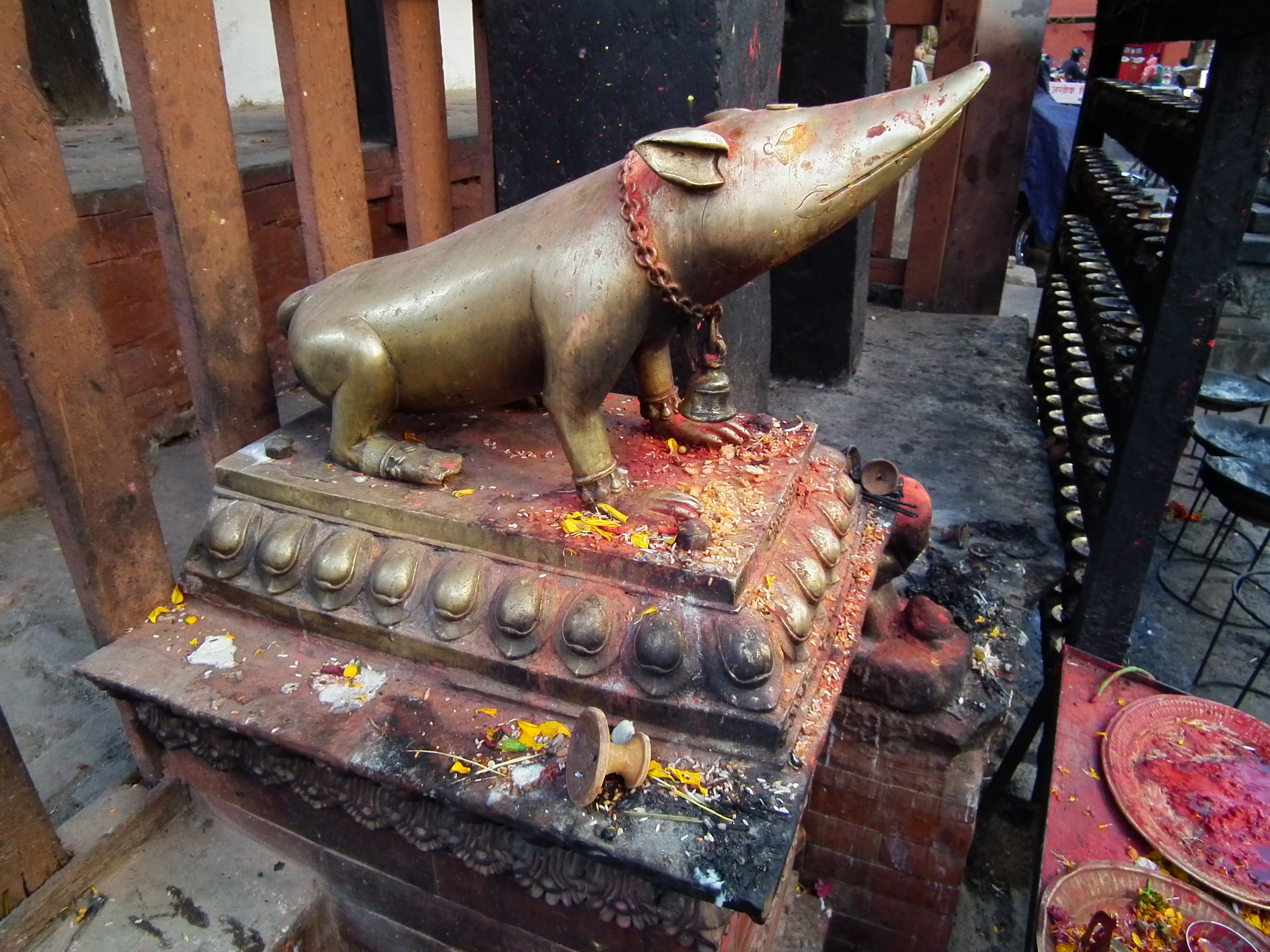
Rat or mouse statue at the temple

== Structure ==
The temple is a single-storeyed structure. The design is also noted for not having a gajur or a pointed design on the center-top of the roof. This design choice is also responsible for naming the locality "Maru" which literally in Newari language means "does not have". The entire exterior of temple is plated in gold and is surrounded by bars at the present moment.

The temple hosts the holy shrine of Ganesh or Ashok Vinayak. On special days like Tuesdays and during special occasions like Dashain and Indra Jatra, the statue is decorated with a metallic cover made of silver or other metals. Right across the narrow road where the temple is, you will find a mouse which is known as a loyal bahan of the god Ganesh. You will also find structures where people can light and place their oil candles. The temple is also decorated with bells.

== See also ==
- List of Hindu temples in Nepal
