= Dhuleshwor =

Religious site in Dailekh District, Karnali Province, Nepal

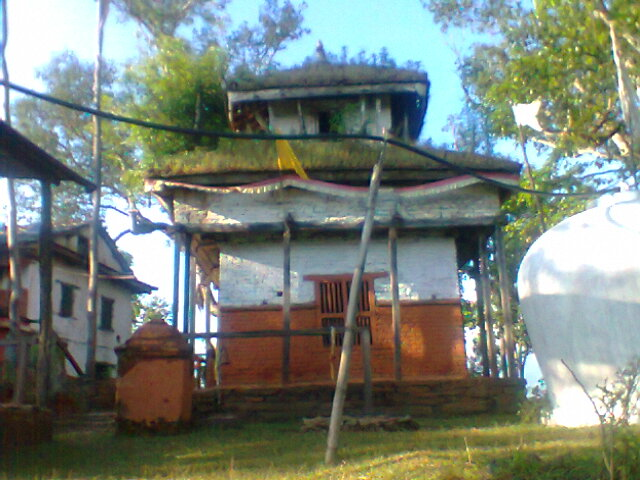
- Dhuleshwor Temple

- Dhuleshwor Temple in Nepal

Religion
- Affiliation: Hinduism
- District: Dailekh
- Deity: Shiva
- Festival: Bada Dashain

Location
- Location: Badalamji, Dullu Municipality
- State: Bheri
- Country: Nepal
- Coordinates: 28.88°N 81.61°E

Architecture
- Type: Pagoda Style

Specifications
- Temple: 4
- Inscriptions: Written in Stone
- Elevation: 544 m (1,785 ft)

Dhuleshwor (Nepali: धुलेश्वर) is a religious site in Dailekh District in Karnali Province, Nepal. It is one of five places under the Panchkoshi, the five holy places of Dailekh. This site is located at Badalamji village of Dullu Municipality.

The ground under the temple generates dust. Scientists have studied it as a minor epicenter of a volcano, however religious faiths credit it with divine power. Dhuleshwor temple is known as the most important of Panchkoshi, among Padukasthan, Shirsthan, Nabhisthan and Kotilasthan.

== Legend ==
According to Ancient holy flame myth and Vaishvanara myth, Kotilasthan does not come under Panchkoshi. Kotilasthan is a Shakta pitha. As per Panchkoshi, a pilgrimage must begin from Padukasthan, Shirsthan, Nabhisthan and finally end up with a night at Dhuleshwor. Vaishvanara myth indicated on its snow fairy episode this place as more saintly than Flame Mountain Badrinath and Kedarnath.

== Related structures ==
Nearby temples include the Bhairab Temple, the Masta Temple and the Shiva Temple. Other structures include the Flame House and the Gaadi House.

The Flame House includes 2 stone inscriptions written in Nepali; the writings are no longer easily seen. One describes then King King Rajendra Bikram Shah who established the temple in 1748 BC. The other describes Colonel Kulman Singh Basnet who built the temple roof in 1778 BC. Most of the structures have been destroyed and many idols were lost during the Nepalese Civil War. On 26 Chaitra 2067, someone looted the statues of Narpateshwor Mahadev and other statues from the Flame House.

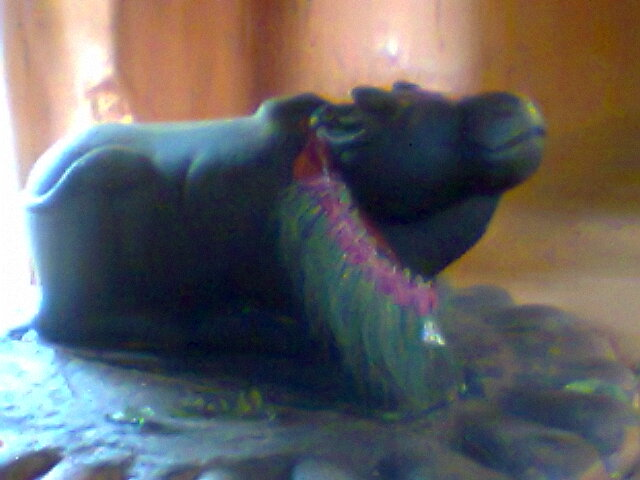
Nandi nearby Shivaling

Bathing at Banganga and Brahamkund at the bottom of the Dhuleshwor is traditional. At Baleshwor Temple funerals are performed. Other worship sites are Dulange Hill, Badalamji and Naag Snake.

== Ritual ==
During the holy worship, wind with dust (dhulo) comes from under ground, labeled "Dhuleshwor", (Lord Shiva's incarnation as dust). A Shivling sits at the center of this temple. On one side of Shivling is Shiva's Ox (Nandishwor) and lion on the other side. Along with that Kal Bhairav, Baal Bhairav and Batuk Bharav statues can be found at the premises. By sacrificing animals Kaal Bhairav is worshiped while the other two are worshiped by shower it with milk. A Masta god statue is also worshiped with milk. Mostly, these are worshiped during Chaite Dashain and Bada Dashain. On normal days, daily worship is done by a bachelor-saint.

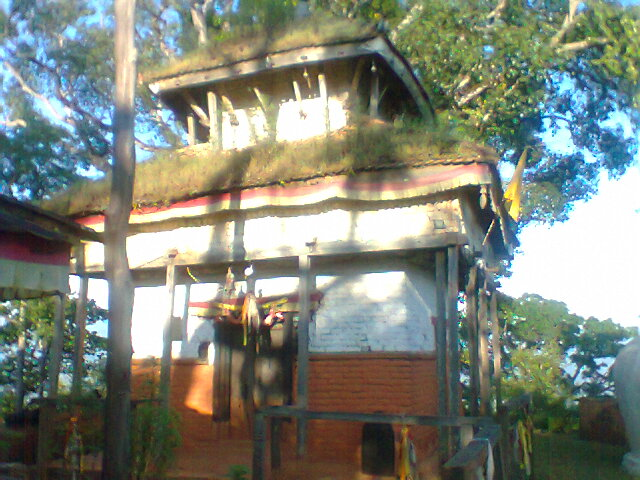
Flame house of Duleshwor Mahadev

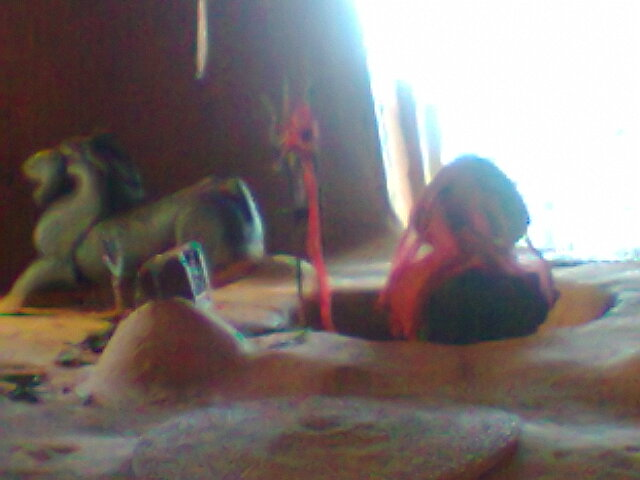
Shivaling at Dhuleshwor

== Mythology ==
Lord Shiva's wife Sati committed suicide by jumping on the holy flame after her father insulted her husband. After her death, Shiva walked around carrying her body and behaving like a mad person. Seeing this and Kailash Parvat empty, because other gods were not able to run the creation smoothly, Lord Bishnu created bacteria that could make her body decay. Wherever Sati's decayed body parts fell on the earth, Shakta pithas emerged.

At Dhuleshwor, Sati's body converted to dust, thus this place is called Dhuleshwor, an incarnation of Shiva as dust.

This place was unknown until the Shivaling was discovered by saint Nadiban. He started to worship alone, hidden. Soldiers from Kathmandu came to arrest him because people complained about him. When the soldiers were taking him to Kathmandu, he returned saying he would come later and reached the palace before the soldiers. The then king of Kathmandu examined him and realized that the power of his meditation had discovered a worship site. Nadiban's offspring became saints and priests of this temple. Their graves are on the temple premises.
