= Akala Devi Temple =

Hindu temple in Nepal

- अकला देवी मन्दिर
- Location within Gandaki Province

Religion
- Affiliation: Hinduism
- District: Kaski
- Deity: Goddess Akala Devi
- Festival: Dashain

Location
- Country: Nepal
- Coordinates: 28.2749665°N 83.9557570°E

Architecture
- Type: Pagoda

Akala Devi temple (Nepali: अकला देवी मन्दिर) is situated at Lamachaur, Pokhara. It is a three tiered roof built in Nepalese style. It is dedicated to Goddess Akala Devi. The Nepalese-style temple of Akala Devi at Lamachaur of Pokhara comprises three tiered roofs but is built of cement and bricks rather than wood. The temple is newly built. Originally, a small shrine honouring the goddess was present under a tree but this was later replaced by the present temple. It is mainly followed by Hinduism religion people.

== Festivals ==
There are many festivals throughout the year, and thousands of people attend these temple to worship. The most important festivals of them are Dashain, which usually takes place during either September or October (as per the traditional Hindu Calendar) and Teej, a large number of devotees visit it on Teej.

== Transportation ==
Local public buses to Akala Devi Temple are available from Mahendrapul, Lamachour, Bhurjung khola.

== See also ==
- List of Hindu temples in Nepal
