= Andhimul Temple =

Hindu temple in Nepal

- आँधिमूल
- Location in Nepal

Religion
- Affiliation: Hinduism
- District: Tanahu District
- Deity: Shiva

Location
- Country: Nepal
- Interactive map of Andhimul Temple
- Coordinates: 27.930°N 84.447°E

Andhimul Temple (Nepali: आँधिमूल) is a Hindu temple located in Satrasay Phant of Anbu Khaireni Rural Municipality. The temple was constructed in 2035 B.S. and a Shivalinga was established in the temple in 2054 BS.

The temple has a pagoda shape. There are two ponds near the temple. Pilgrims from various parts of the country, including Tanahun, Kaski, Gorkha, and Lamjung, pay a visit to the temple. They feed pigeons and sacrifice goats and chickens.

The temple is open every day except on the month of Shrawan and on no moon days.

== Mythology ==
According to the legend, when a grandmother came with her granddaughter to this place to graze cows, the granddaughter felt thirsty. While searching for water, she secretly found water in this place and quenched her thirst. It is believed that in the Magh language, Aan means thirst and Dhi means water; hence, the place was called Andhimul.

According to another legend, when Cheli was coming to Mawli in ancient times, a storm appeared when he reached at the middle of the forest. To avoid the storm, they stayed in the cave near the arch tree at this place. Later, in a dream, a relative was ordered to worship at the base of a tree and burn incense on the full moon day. While excavating the place that he saw in the dream, a source of water emanating from the base of the same tree started to form a pond. It is believed that the local people have been worshipping the Andhimul and the pond since after.

== See also ==
- List of Hindu temples in Nepal
