= Naradevi Temple =

Temple in Nepal

- नरदेवी मन्दिर
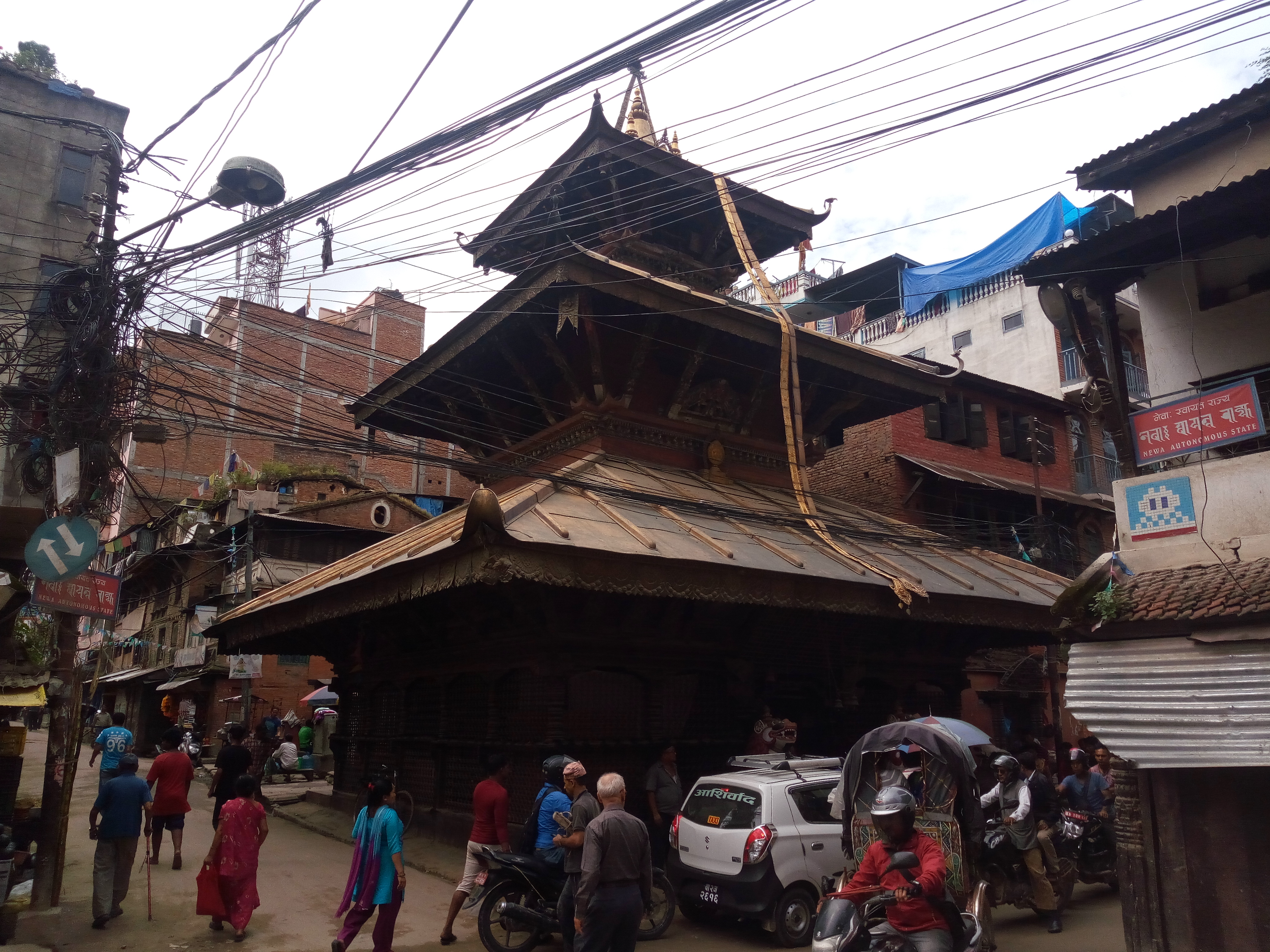

- Location in Nepal

Religion
- Affiliation: Hinduism
- District: Kathmandu district
- Deity: Kali

Location
- Country: Nepal
- Interactive map of Naradevi Temple
- Coordinates: 27.7076367°N 85.306°E

Naradevi Temple (Nepali: नरदेवी मन्दिर), also called Swetakaali Temple, is a Hindu temple located in an older part of Kathmandu, Nepal. It is believed that occult and tantric rituals are performed in the temple and there is a female energy in the temple. The goddess housed in the temple, Sweta Kali is believed to receive human sacrifice in the ancient times. The goddess is also referred as Nyata Ajima by the Newar community. The goddess is also considered to be the mother of the goddess Kumari Chandeswori Bhagwati.

On the tenth day of Dasain, Khadga Jatra is celebrated in the temple. Various swords (Khadga) are taken to the temple in a grand procession and revered with traditional tantric rituals. Buffalo slain in a single blow are sacrificed to mark the event of Nawami.

== Mythology ==
According to the mythology, a king of Patan in his hunting trip lost his way in Kantipur (current Kathmandu). When he reached near Kilagal, he was chased by a wild elephant and upon trying to escape the elephant he reached near Nardevi temple and hid inside a huge tree. There he got unconscious. When he woke up, goddess Swetakali appeared and granted his life back by saying “You may live.” The king then returned to Patan and later erected the Nardevi temple. Two other two kings of Bhaktapur also saw the same goddess which led them to repair the temple and set up a group to look after the temple. They also started the ceremony of lighting ghee lamps and sacrificing a sheep in the temple. This ritual is carried out by the Kumale potters from Thimi to commemorate the goddess.

The locals believe that the original home called Byachen belonging to of the goddess, still exists in the nearby area where all the ornaments and clothes are secured.

== History ==
The temple is believed to have been established in the ninth century by Gunakamadeva, the founder of Kathmandu.

== Architecture ==
The temple is a three tired structure. One of the roofs is gold plated and the support pillars are crafted artistically. The temple houses three silver statues of Kali.

== Gallery ==
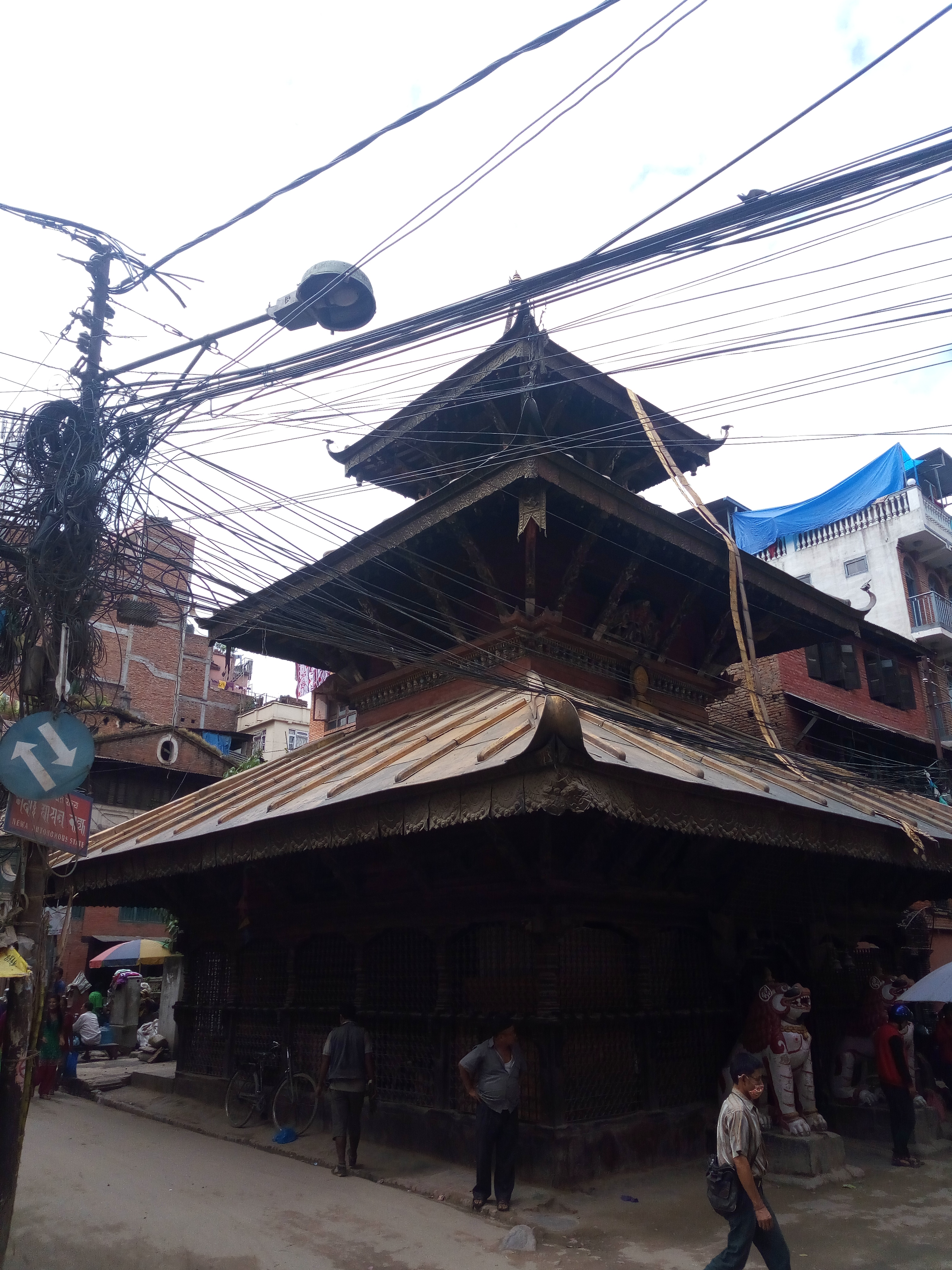
Main view

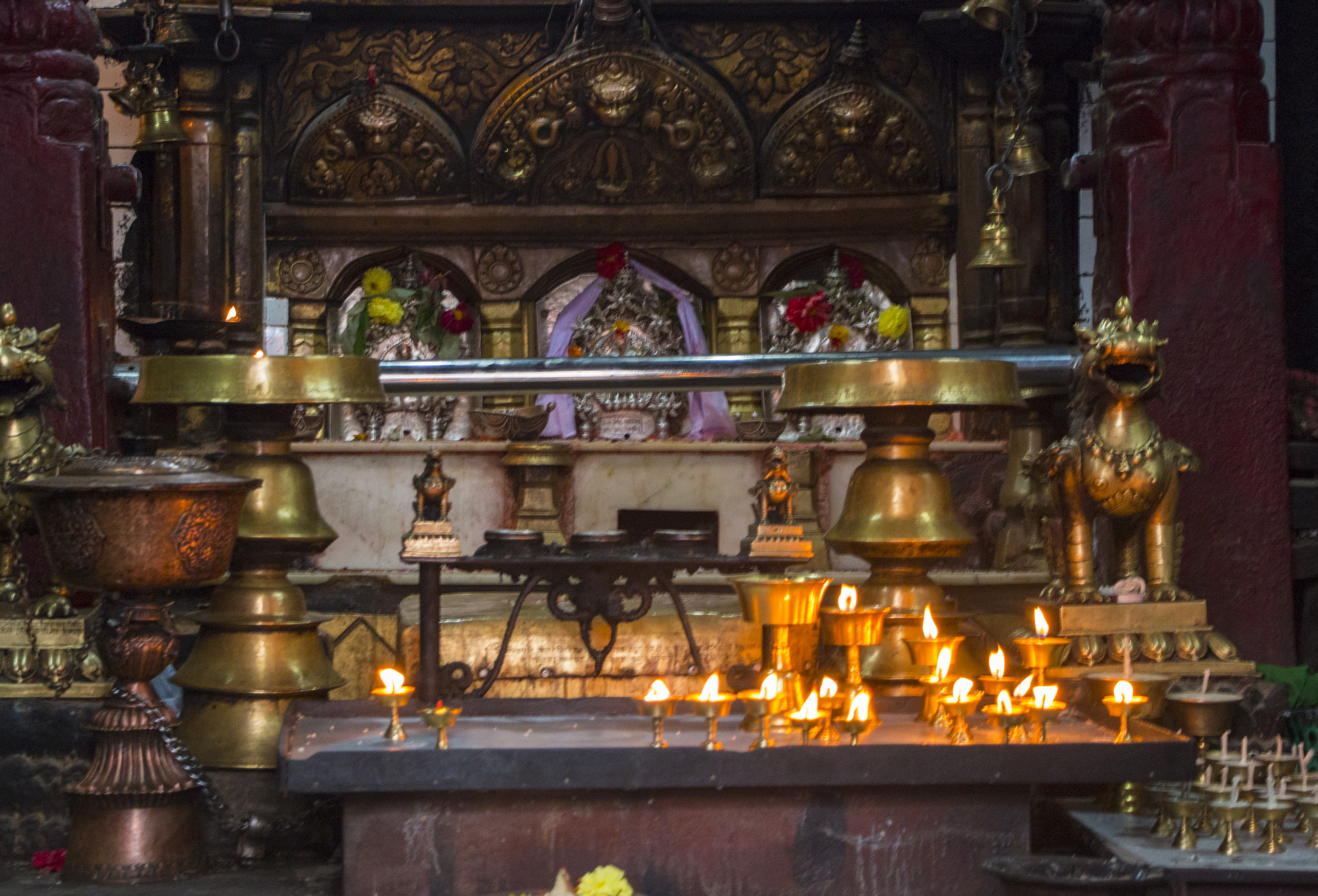
Statue inside the temple

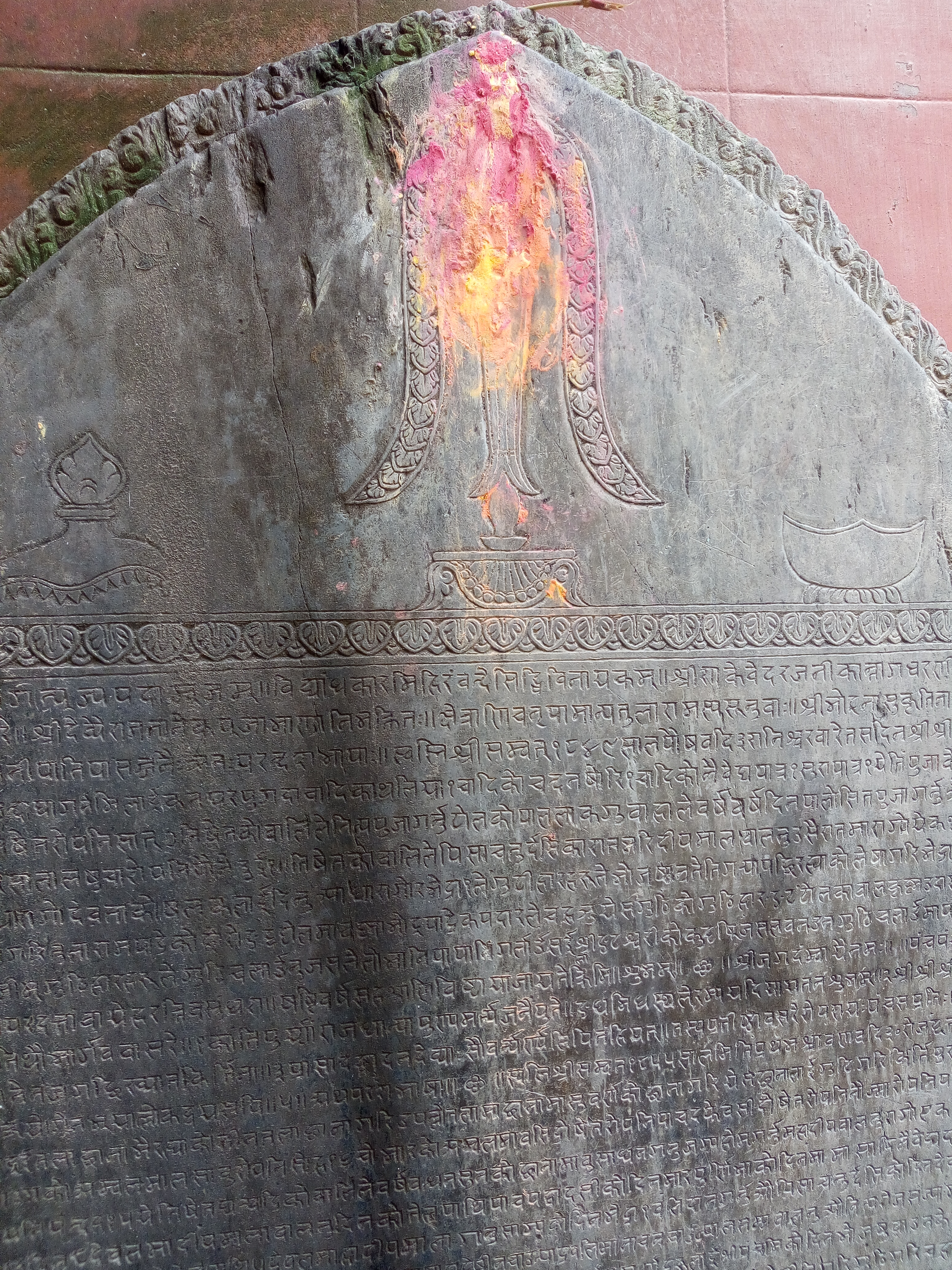
Stone inscription

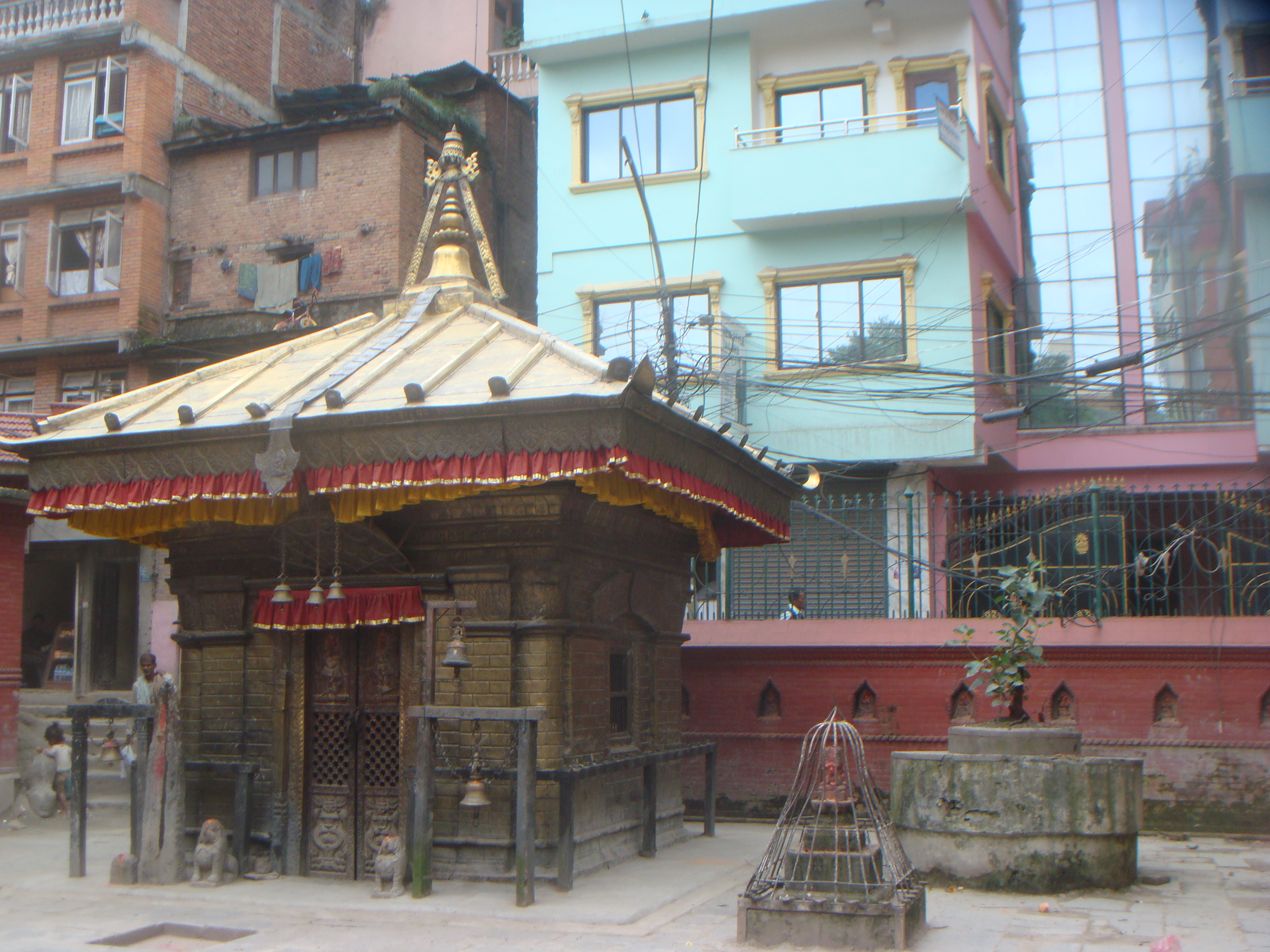
Raktakalika temple next to Naradevi

== See also ==
- List of Hindu temples in Nepal
