= Nagadesh =

Naagdesh (Nagadesh) नागदेश नगदेश (जयपूर)
- Nicknames: Narse, Nagadesh, Naagdesh
- Interactive map of Naagdesh (Nagadesh)
- Coordinates: 27°41′05″N 85°23′05″E
- Country: Nepal
- Zone: Bagmati Zone
- District: Bhaktapur District

Population (2011)
  - Total: 6,900
  - Religions: Hindu
- Time zone: UTC+5:45 (Nepal Time)
- Postal code: 44811

Nagadesh (Newar: 𑐣𑐐𑐡𑐾𑐱; from Classical Newar: 𑐣𑐎𑐡𑐾𑐱, nakadeśa, meaning "new city") is an ancient Newar city in Madhyapur Thimi Municipality in Bhaktapur District in the Bagmati Zone of central Nepal. In 2011 it had a population of approximately 6,900 with more than 1500 houses in it, according to the 2011 Nepal census. At the time of the 1991 Nepal census it had a population of 4,237 with 693 houses in it. The primary occupation is farming.

Nagadesh is famous for Shree Sidhi Ganesh Jatra, लुँझ्या Sunko Jhyaal (Golden Window Of Nagadesh), Sileshwor Mahadev Bisantaki Tole Nagadesh, Nagadesh Mahakali Naach, Bhairav Naach, Manohara Ghat, Nagadesh sindur jatra, Pulu Kishi Pyaakha Naach, Nagadesh Buddha Bihar.

Festivals that are celebrated in Nagadesh. People of Nagadesh celebrates festivals each month starting from the new year to the Holi puni at the end of the year.

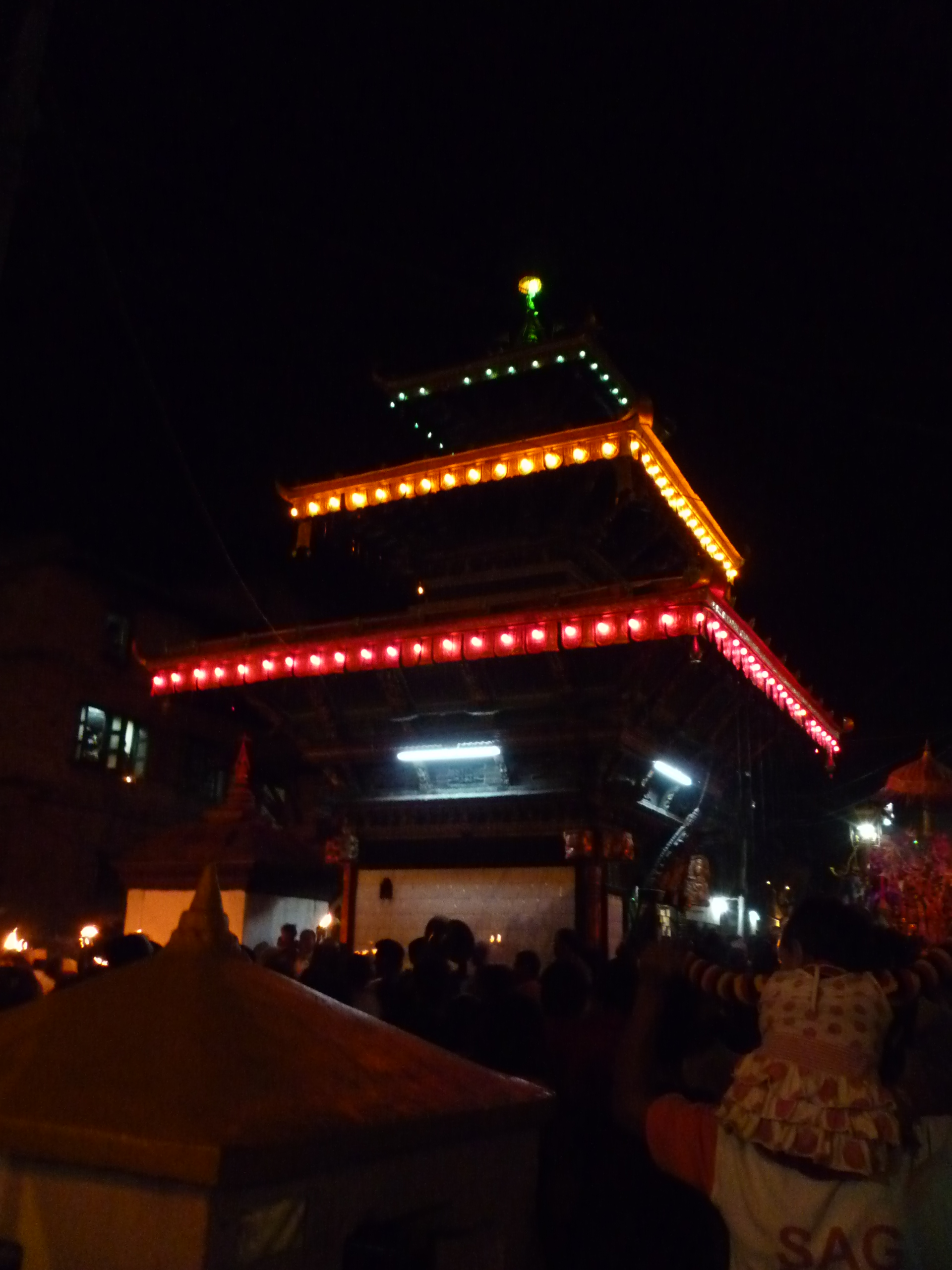

- Biska jatra (New year festival) Shree Sidhi Ganesh Rath Jatra
- Mother's Day (Mathathirtha Aunshi)
- Buddha purnima (Buddha purnima)
- Kumar Khasti (Sithi Nakha)
- Gathamaga charya
- Janai puni: Sileshwor Mahadev Bisantaki Tole Naagdesh Mela
- Sa: Paaru (Gai Jatra)
- Naagdesh Mahakali Naach, Bhairav Naach
- Father's day (Kushe Aushi)
- Yenha Punchi (in Purnima (full moon) After Indra Jatra of Kathmandu)
- Dashain (Nawaratri)
- Tihar (Laxmi pooja, Mha puja, Kija puja,)
- Sakima punhi
- Dhanya purnima (Yomari purnima)
- Maghe sankranti (Ghya-chaku sankranti) (Makar Sankranti)
- Pulu Kishi Pyaakha Naach
- Shree panchami
- Shiva ratri
- Holi (Holi purnima)
