= Parasnath Temple (Nepal) =

Hindu temple in southern Nepal

- पारसनाथ मन्दिर
- Location in Nepal

Religion
- Affiliation: Hinduism
- District: Parsa district
- Deity: Shiva

Location
- Location: Mahuwan village
- Country: Nepal
- Interactive map of Parasnath Temple
- Coordinates: 27.1123116°N 84.801268°E

Parasnath temple (Nepali: पारसनाथ मन्दिर) is located in Mahuwan village, Parsa district of Nepal. Pilgrims from Nepal and India visits the temple. The name of district is based on the name of this temple. According to mythology, the temple was established by a Jain hermit, Parasnath. The temple is dedicated to Lord Shiva and holds significant historical and religious importance.

== See also ==
- List of Hindu temples in Nepal
