= Maitidevi Temple =

- मैतिदेवी मन्दिर
- Maitidevi Temple decorated with lights during Dashain, Tihar festival

Religion
- Affiliation: Hinduism
- District: Kathmandu
- Deity: Goddess Maitidevi
- Festivals: Dashain, Tihar

Location
- Country: Nepal
- Interactive map of Maitidevi Temple

Architecture
- Type: Pagoda
- Established: 7th century

Maitidevi Temple (Nepali: मैतिदेवी मन्दिर, IAST: Maitidevi Mandira, lit. 'parental home of all goddesses') is a Hindu temple dedicated to powerful and benevolent manifestation of Goddess Durga, it is situated in Kathmandu city in Bagmati Province, Nepal with its original foundation being established in the 7th century by Lichchhavi King Amshu Verma. The present structure dates to the early 20th century under Rana Prime Minister Chandra Shumsher.

== See also ==
- List of Hindu temples in Nepal
