= Baidyanath Dham (Nepal) =

Hindu pilgrimage site in Nepal

- बैद्यनाथ धाम
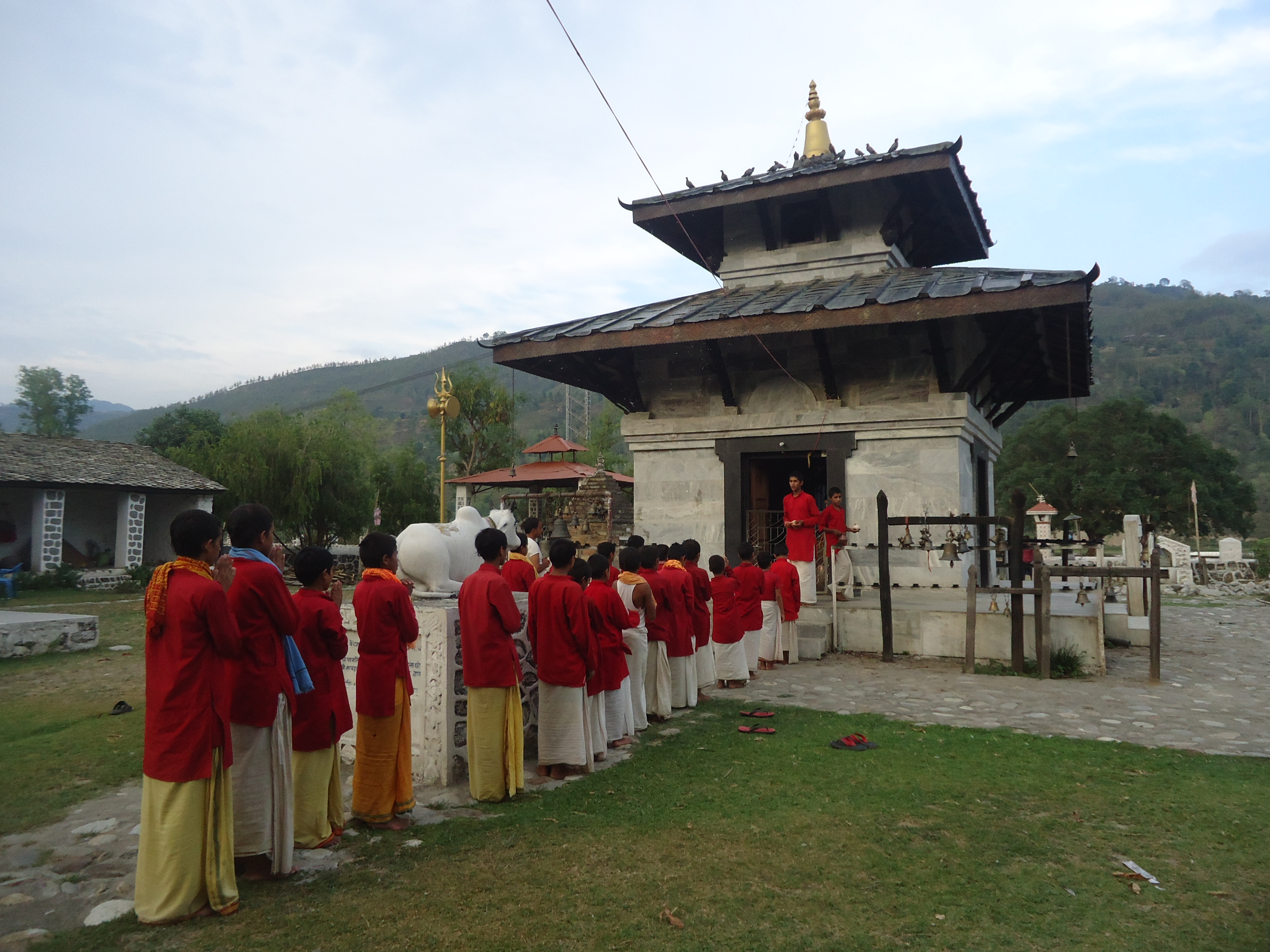

- Location in Nepal

Religion
- Affiliation: Hinduism
- District: Achham District
- Deity: Shiva
- Festival: Shivaratri

Location
- Country: Nepal
- Interactive map of Baidyanath Dham
- Coordinates: 24.49248°N 86.69997°E

Baidyanath Dham, one of the four Shrines of Nepal, is a shrine of Lord Shiva located in Achham District in the confluence of the Budhi Ganga and Saraswati rivers in Achham district. The shrine has a school to teach Ved called Ved Bidyashram. In 2020, the government allocated NPR 2 million for Baidyanath Dham to upgrade Ved Bidyashram.

In Shivaratri pilgrims from Nepal and India visit this place.

== Legend ==
The place has been mentioned in Skanda Purana in the section of Manas Khanda. When Ravan could not get the vision of Shiva by meditating in Kailash Parbat, he came to Baidyanath for mediation. Shiva appeared to him and granted his wish to attach 9 heads at this place. As Shiva acted as a Baidya, a doctor, this place is called Baidyanath.

== History ==
The place is mentioned by Abhaya Malla, the king of Achham in 1440 BS. He said the place has the capacity to cure all disease. Inscriptions of 17th century also mention the Shah Kings. A Baiju Kumal is assigned as a Dwarpal and Jalakhar Joshi Baidya as the priest of this temple since the time of Abhaya Malla.

The place also houses the weapons of Gorkha Army that they left during the Unification of Nepal. The legend says that when Gorkha army came to this place, they were blinded and had to retreat.

== See also ==
- List of Hindu temples in Nepal
