= Bolbam Dham =

Hindu temple in Nepal

- Bolbam Dham
- Location in Nepal

Religion
- Affiliation: Hinduism
- District: Rupandehi
- Deity: Shiva

Location
- Country: Nepal
- Interactive map of Bolbam Dham
- Coordinates: 27.6756963°N 83.35435°E

Bolbam Dham (Nepali: बोलबम धाम) is a Hindu temple in Rupandehi district, Sainamaina Municipality of the western Nepal. The temple complex consists of Shiva Pancyyan, Ganesh-Parvati temple, Laxmi Narayan temple, Radha Krishna temple, and Sanoshi Mata temple. There are 108 shivalingas and an idol of Shiva inside the temple complex. The temple started Shravani Mela for the first time in Nepal. Also, the first Shiva Jyotilinga in Nepal was established in this temple. The main festival of the temple occurs in the month of Shrawan. About 30 thousands pilgrims visit the temple on each Mondays during the month of Shravan. Other festival celebrated in the temple includes Janai Purnima. Pilgrims are mostly Hindus from Nepal and India. Nepal Government has issued a postal stamp in 2073 BS (2016–2017) showing the imagery of the Shiva Jyotirlinga from this temple.

== History ==
The place is believed to have history prior to the birth of Buddha. The parents of Buddha are believed to have offered prayers to the Shivalinga of this temple.

The recorded history of the temple indicates that about 150 years ago, there was a ruin of shiva temple at the location of the current temple. A local landlord named Chandavan Chaudhary had seen a Shivalinga near the farm in this area. He started digging it, but was unable to dig out completely, so instead, he constructed a temple, keeping the Shivalinga in the centre. Chaudhary died before the temple was completed, however, he had appointed a priest to look after the temple. After the priest also died, the temple was abandoned and turned into ruins. In 2035 BS (1978–1979), a Nāga hermit from India came to stay in the current temple complex. He improved the land and started to build the temple. In 2045 BS (1988–1989), the temple of Shiva paschyaana was constructed. From 2049 BS (1992–1993), Jalaparna ritual was started. In 2053 BS (1996–1997), budget from local government was allocated to develop the temple as a religious destination.

== See also ==
- List of Hindu temples in Nepal
