= Aakashdevi Temple =

Hindu temple in Nepal

Religion
- Affiliation: Hinduism
- Deity: Devi (female Goddess)
- Festivals: Teej, Shivarattri, Ram Navami, Bala Chathurdasi, Krishna Janmashtami, Dashain

Location
- Location: Arghakhanchi District, Nepal
- Interactive map of Aakashdevi Temple
- Coordinates: 28.0377809°N 83.2072097°E

Aakashdevi Temple (Nepali: आकाशदेवी मन्दिर नेपाल) also called Tarakhase Temple is a Hindu goddess temple located in Bahigaun Tarakhase within the Chhatradev Rural Municipality of Arghakhanchi District, Nepal. With its 13 storied architecture (125 feet tall), it is recognized as the tallest temple in the district. The temple was constructed in 2008 BS (1951–1952).

The temple serves as a focal point for various local festivals, including Teej, Shivarattri, Ram Navami, Bala Chathurdasi, Krishna Janmashtami, and Dashain. These events attract numerous devotees, who believe that worshipping at the temple fulfills their wishes through the blessings of the goddess.

== See also ==
- List of Hindu temples in Nepal
