= Bala Tripura Sundari Temple =

Hindu temple in Nepal

Shree Bala Tripura Sundari Devi Temple
- बाला त्रिपुरा सुन्दरी मन्दिर
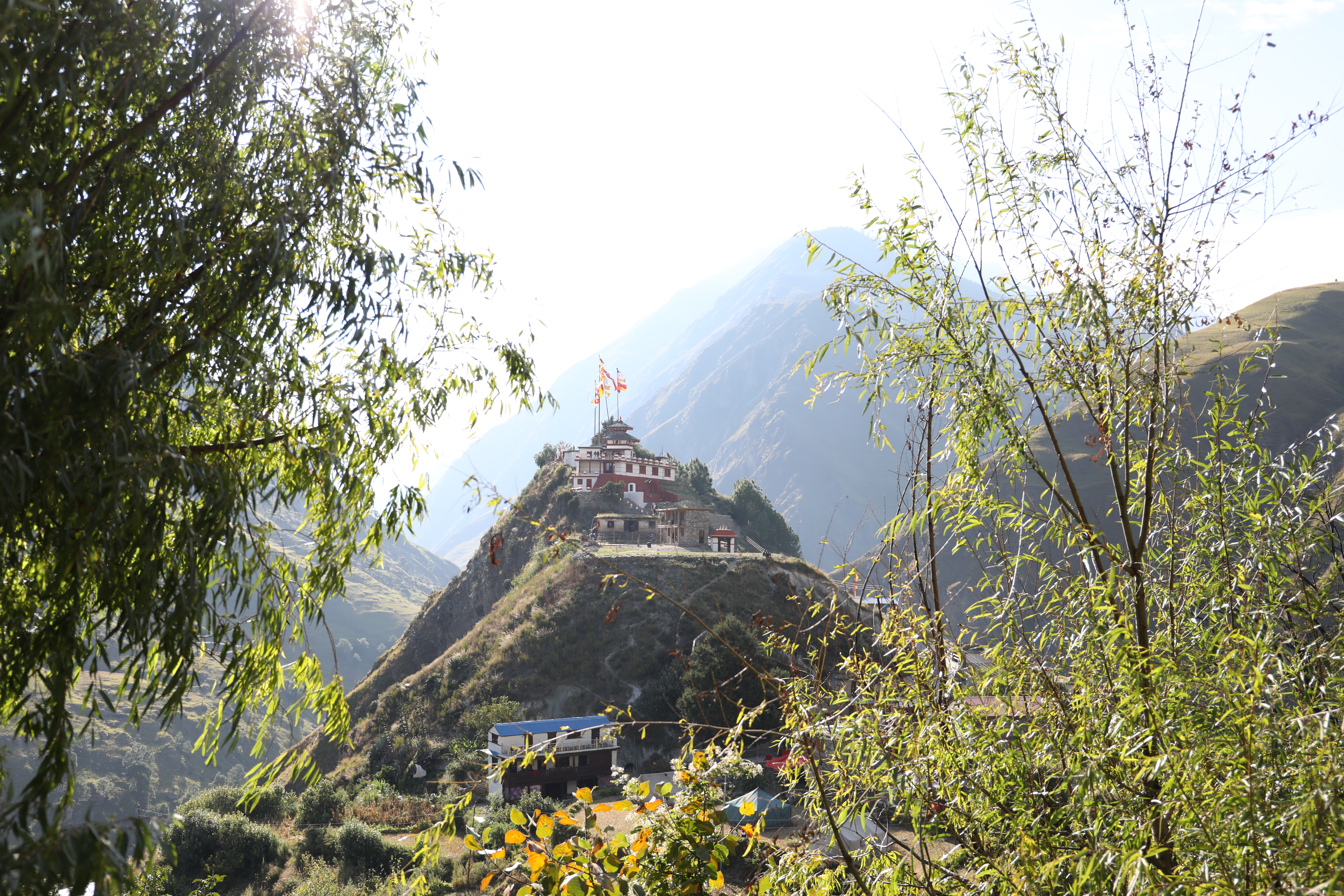

- Location in Nepal

Religion
- Affiliation: Hinduism
- District: Dolpa District
- Deity: Durga

Location
- State: Karnali
- Country: Nepal
- Interactive map of Shree Bala Tripura Sundari Devi Temple
- Coordinates: 29.025°N 82.784°E

Architecture
- Established: 1057; 969 years ago

Website
- Official website

Shree Bala Tripura Sundari Devi Bhagawoti Temple, regarded as the Purna Shakti Peeth (Sanskrit: शक्ति पीठ, romanized: Śakti Pīṭha, lit. 'seat of Shakti'), is a significant pilgrimage site in Shaktism. Shree Bala Tripura Sundari Devi Bhagawoti Temple,

The temple is located near Tripurakot on the bank of the Thuli Bheri river in the Dolpa district of Nepal, and is said to have been built in the 12th century for the sister of God masto. About 20,000 pilgrims visit the temple every year, mostly during the Dashain festival.

The temple is on a hill near the confluence of the Bhariavi Ganga, Tamrabarni and Sundari rivers. The temple has statues of five goddesses: Barahi, Chamunda, Bhramayani, Indrayani and Mahakali. There are eight other metal idols of god and goddesses. The idols of Chamunda, Chandika, Nusing and Baisnav were stolen in 2029 BS (1972).

Due to the renown of Bala Tripura Sundari Bhagawoti Temple, Universe Master Shree Shankaracharya of Kanchi Kamakoti, India, prayed and worshiped at this temple. Similarly, Shree Khaptad Baba received Yog Siddhi from this temple. In commemoration of this historical reception, the Khaptad Baba route, which comprises 1,008 steps, was constructed around the premises of the temple in 2020.

== History ==
According to legend, a king named Bikram Shahi ruled the area, with his palace at the current location of the temple. After beating rice in Okhall (rice mill), he found the rice had doubled. This mystery led the king to excavate the area in around 1114 BS. He found a statue of Bhagwati standing in a Sadkon Yantra, and many butterflies came out of the excavated pit. One of the butterflies flew over and sat at the location where the temple now lies. When villagers tried to catch the butterfly, it transformed into stone.

Among the remaining eight butterflies, five flew to different places in Nepal which are now established as religious centres: Kanika Sundari in Jumla district, Bagheshwori in Nepalgunj district, KhairaBang Bhagawoti in Salyan district, Tripureshwori Bhagawoti in Baitadi district, and BadiMalika in Doti district.

The first priest of the temple was Bistas, appointed by King Bikram Shahi. Later Chaulagai, Sinkhadas, Neupane and Upadhya Bhramins were appointed as priests.

Three butterflies changed to statues while villagers attempt to catch them. Observing the transformation of butterflies to statues while attempting to catch them, villagers discussed what to do next with the other butterflies. But this occurrence had already appeared as a dream to Kaji Bista, a villager. He dreamed "we were nine sister of Durga Bhagawati, villagers have to construct a temple at the place where there exist Okhall and do regular worship and prayer from Brahmin of Neupane Caste." The next morning, Kaji Bista discussed his dream with villagers and villagers constructed a small temple over the place of Okhall.

During that period, Neupane castes Brahmin were not present in Tibrikot district. This created a problem and pressure on the dwellers of Tibrikot. So they decided to call Brahmin from Jumla district. But fortunately Sukdev Neupane of Jumla, along with a group were returning from Muktinath and staying at Bala Tripura Sundari Bhagawati temple which lies on the way of muktinath to Jumla. Villagers shared the dream related to worshiping of statutes with Sukdev Neupane, hoping to let him stay at the temple as a regular priest and the villagers would manage all necessary properties (land, house, money, etc.) for him to stay at Tibrikot. But the group of Sukdev refused the villager's proposal and moved on to Jumla. But on the way to Jumla from Tibrikot near the Temple there lie's a river named Tamrawani. While crossing the river Sukdev and his groups became blind, but as they attempt to return to Bala Tripura Sundari Bhagawati temple their blindness problem disappeared. They felt that this was the effect of the goddess Bala Tripura Sundari Bhagawati. So Brahmin Sukdev Neupane decided to stay at the temple as regular priest. After the establishment of the temple, Tibrikot was renamed Tripurakot. Up to the present day, regular worship and prayer are being done by Sukdev Neupane and his descendants.

== Renovation ==
In 1978, the temple was renovated by the Government of Nepal.

It was renovated again on 10 September 2015, under the leadership of temple trustee Laxmi Kant Upadhaya and assisted by a grant from the Indian government worth 33.3 million Nepalese rupees; ambassador of India Shri Ranjit Rae inaugurated the renovated temple. The renovation upgraded the old structure with improved facilities to accommodate the 20,000 pilgrims who visited the temple every year. To participate in the restoration and enhance the temple, the temple trustee brought in a woodcarver from Lalitpur and a stone carver from Bhaktapur, as these cities are well known for their wood and stone craftsmanship, respectively. As the temple is in Dolpa district, a remote part of Nepal, all the tools, materials, and craftsmen were flown in to Dolpa.

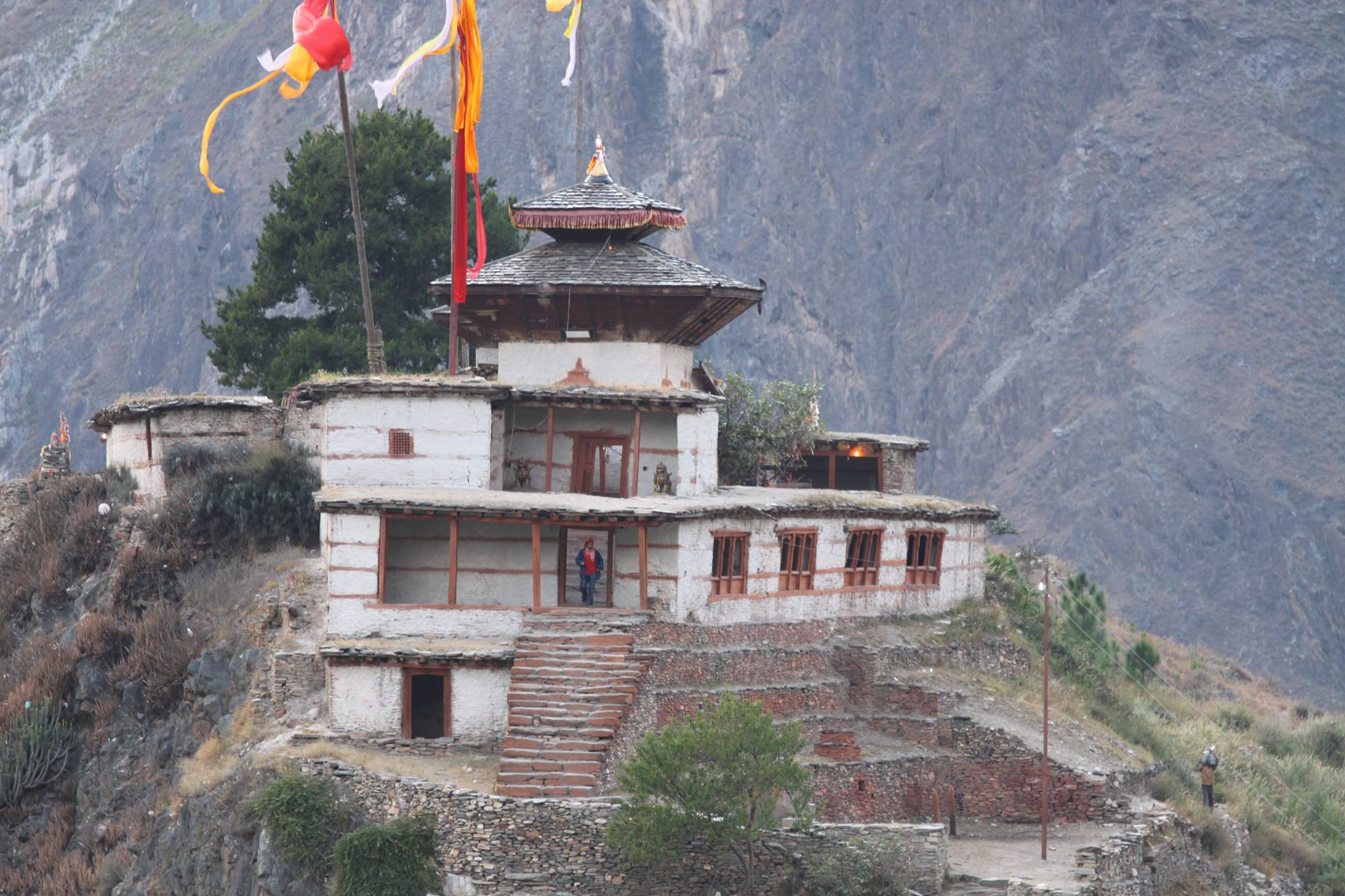
Before Renovation of Shree Bala Tripura Sundari Devi Bhagawoti Temple, Dolpa

== Notable events ==
In 2018, the Dalit community of Nepal were allowed to enter the temple for the first time in history.

== See also ==
- List of Hindu temples in Nepal
