= Shiva Parvati Temple =

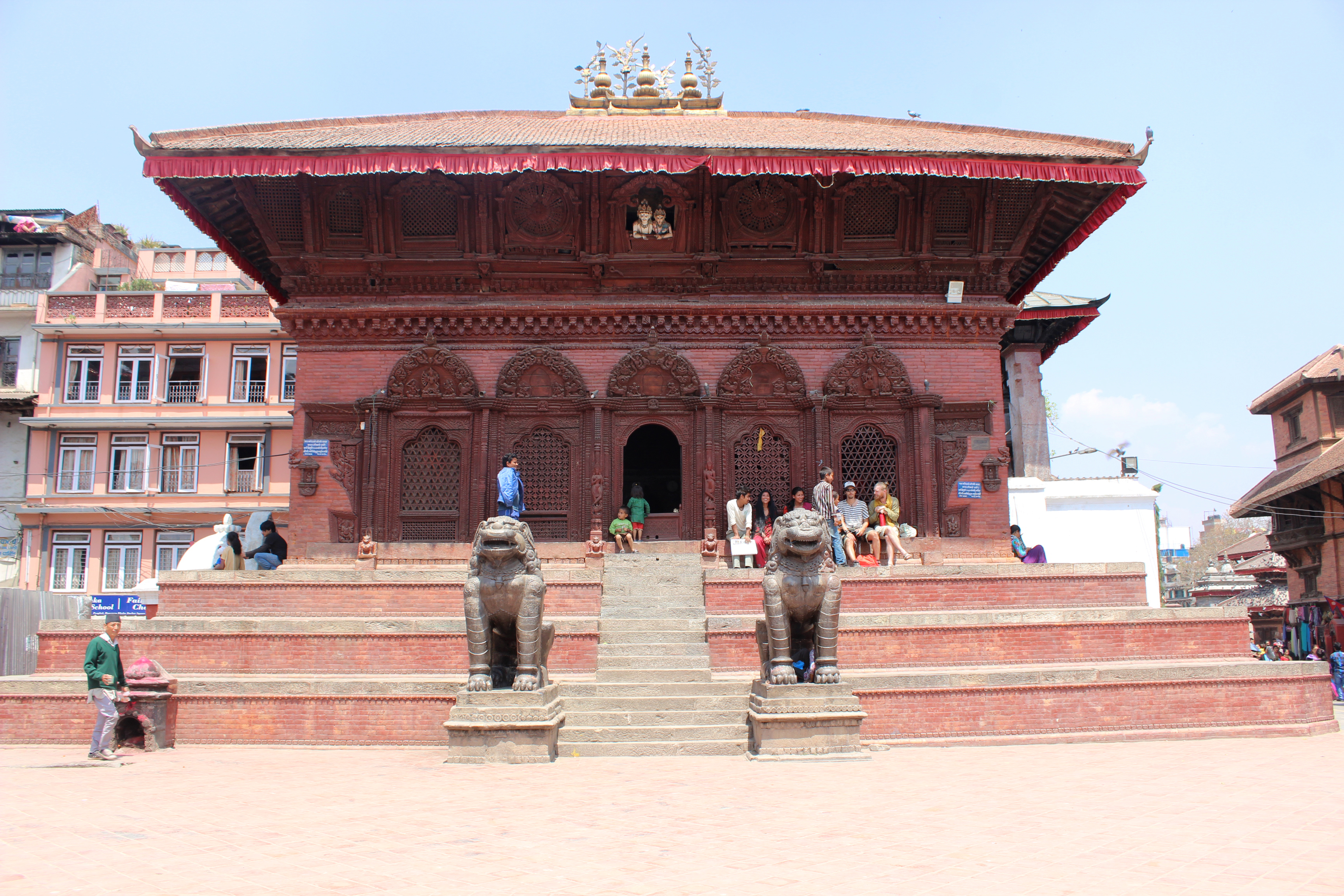
- Shiva Parvati Temple in 2014

- Location within Bagmati Province Location within Nepal

Religion
- Affiliation: Hinduism
- District: Kathmandu District
- Province: Bagmati Province
- Deity: Shiva Parvati

Location
- Location: Kathmandu Durbar Square
- Country: Nepal
- Interactive map of Shiva Parvati Temple
- Coordinates: 27.704447866917825°N 85.30643325926691°E

Shiva Parvati Temple is a Hindu temple located in Kathmandu Durbar Square, Nepal.

It was built by Bahadur Shah, son of Nepal's first king Prithvi Narayan Shah. The temple survived the April 2015 Nepal earthquake.

== Gallery ==
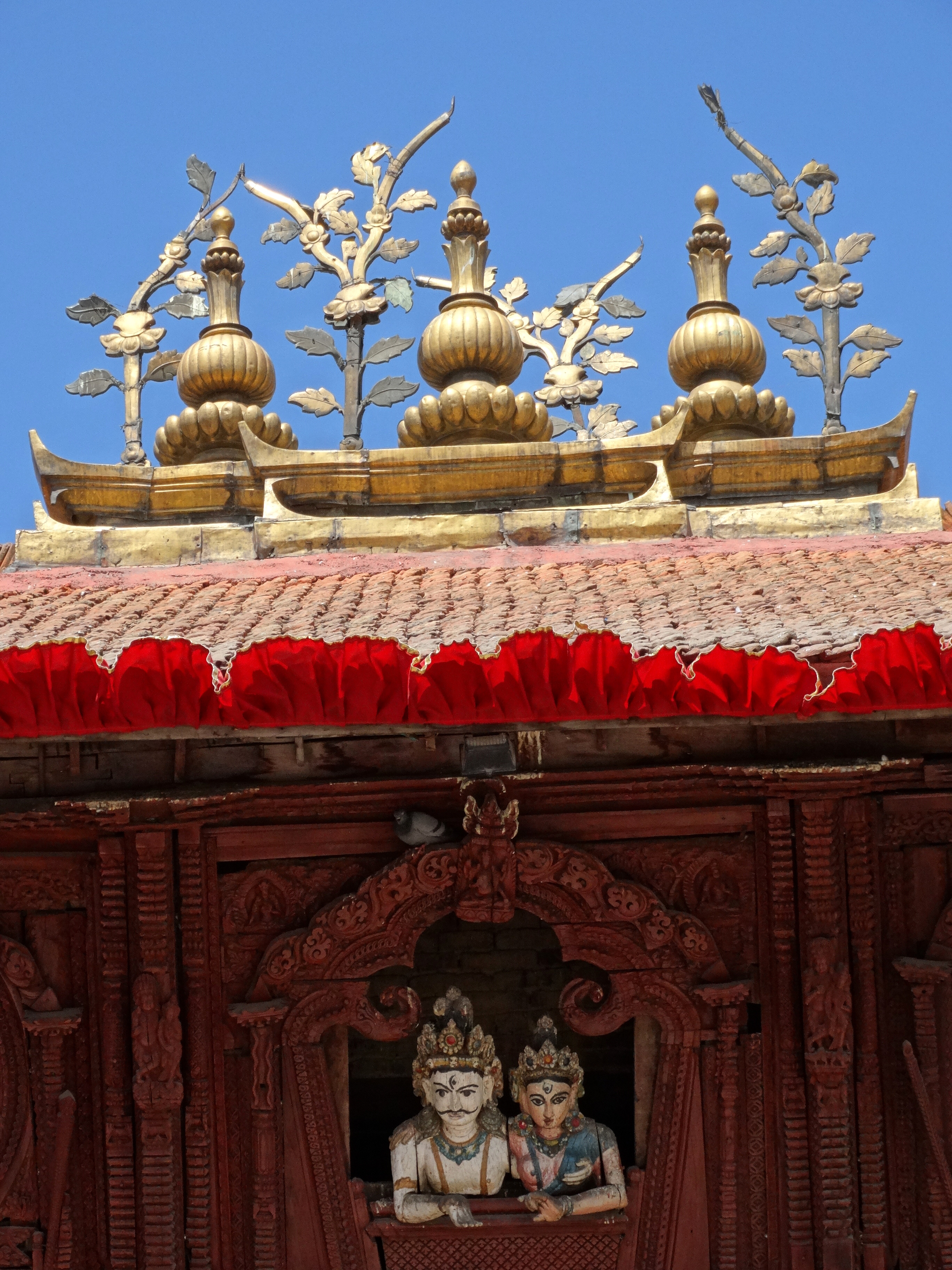
Shiva and Parvati looking down

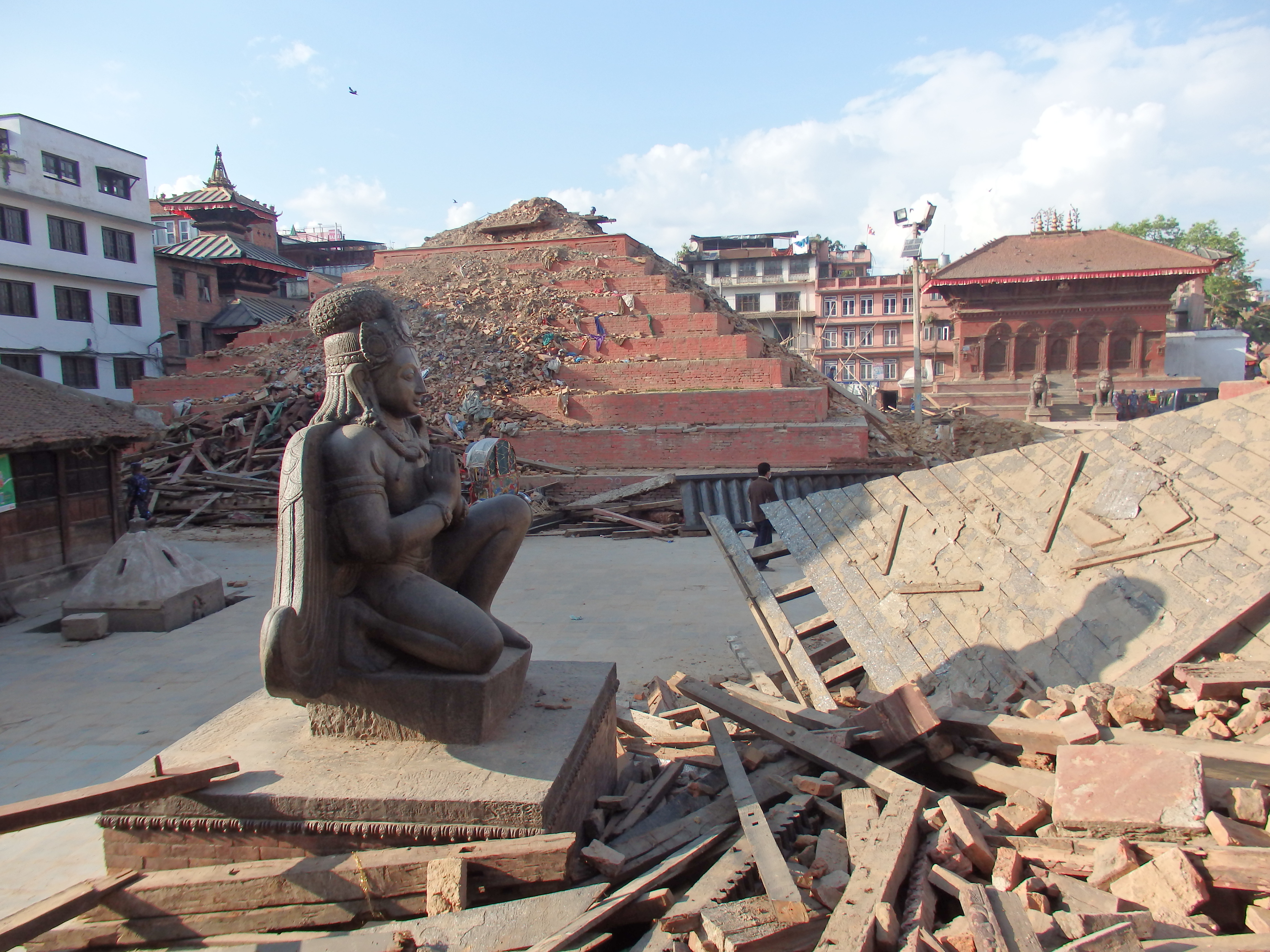
The aftermath of the April 2015 Nepal earthquake; Shiva Parvati Temple located extremely right
