= Karyabinayak Temple =

Hindu temple in Nepal

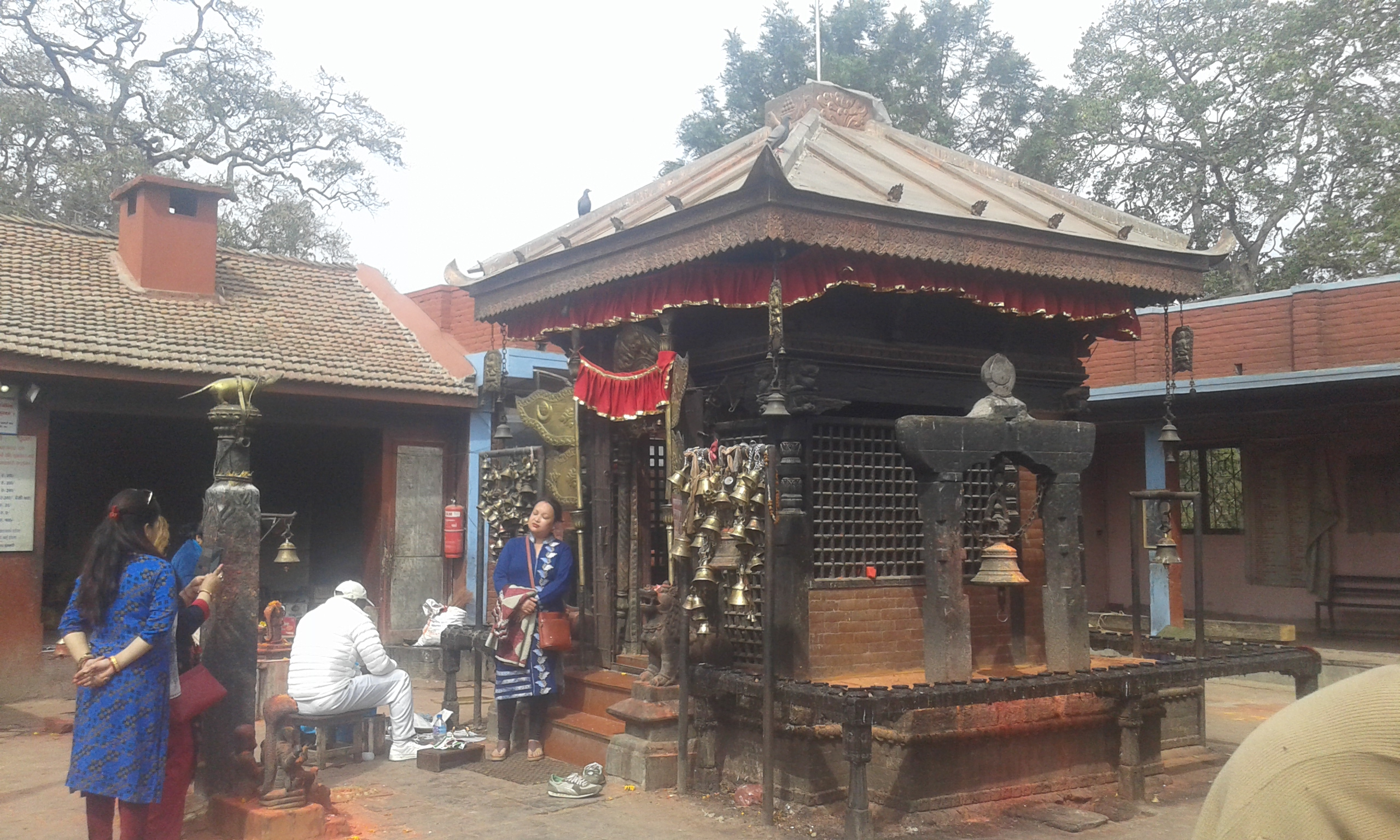

- Location of Karya Binayak Temple in Nepal.

Religion
- Affiliation: Hinduism
- District: Lalitpur District
- Deity: Ganesh
- Festival: Ganesha Chaturthi

Location
- Location: Lalitpur, Nepal
- State: Bagmati Zone
- Country: Nepal
- Coordinates: 27°37′54.73″N 85°18′8.55″E

Karya Binayak (कार्यविनायक मन्दिर) is a Hindu temple located in Bungamati, Lalitpur District. It is about ten kilometres south of Kathmandu.

== History ==
The Karyabinayak Temple was dedicated on the fourth Thursday of the month of Chait in Nepal Samvat 781 (1661 AD) under the leadership of local leader Purna Singh of Bungamati. (Note: At this time the reign of Shri Niwas Malla had just begun in Patan.) Worship originally took place on a naturally formed stone in the shape of the deity, Ganesha. Now, a statue of Ganesha—covered with artistic silver—is kept inside the temple.

== Deities and worshippers ==
Karyabinayak is one of the four famous Vinayakas of Kathmandu Valley. (Note: Other Vinayakas are Jal Binayak of Chobhar, Surya Binayak of Bhaktapur, and Ashok Binayak of Kathmandu.) Before starting any work, devotees come to Karyabinayak to wish for the successful completion of that work. The site gets very crowded on Tuesdays and Saturdays.

Most of the priests who serve at the temple carry the surname 'Tuladhar'. The association of priests is called the 'Nine Priests Association'. On the day of Paha Chahre (during the Ghoda Jatra) there is a Karyabinayak deity procession in Bungamati, at a place the people of Bungamati call "Gale", which means forest. Karyabinayak is also a famous picnic spot.

== Architecture ==
The small temple is built in a tiered style, that was renovated during the reign of King Mahendra.

== See also ==
- List of Hindu temples in Nepal
