= Padukasthan =

Hindu pilgrimage site in Nepal

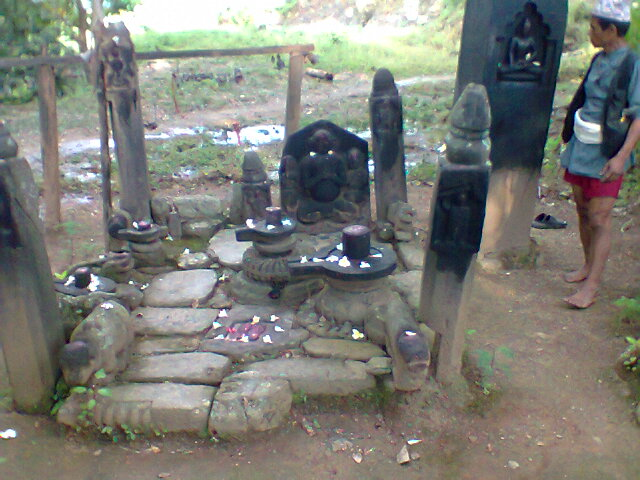
- Bishnu Paduka and Stone Pillars

- Padukasthan in Nepal

Religion
- Affiliation: Hinduism
- District: Dailekh
- Deity: Sati (Hindu goddess), Bishnu
- Festivals: Bada Dashain, Magha Purnima, Shrawn Purnima, Maha Shivaratri

Location
- Location: Padukasthan, Dullu Municipality
- State: Bheri
- Country: Nepal
- Interactive map of Padukasthan
- Coordinates: 28.90°N 81.56°E

Architecture
- Type: Pagoda Style
- Inscriptions: Written in Stone

Padukasthan (Nepali: पादुकास्थान) is a Hindu religious site in Dailekh district of Karnali Province in Nepal. It is one of the five places under the Panchkoshi, the five holy places of Dailekh. This site is located at Dullu Municipality, former Padukasthan VDC. According to mythology, this place is named after Lord Shiva's wife, Satidevi's decayed feet; "Paduka" meaning feet and "sthan" meaning the place.

Even the inscription of the feet of Lord Bisnu was found here, so this place is also called as Bishnu Padukasthan. Previously, as Shirsthan and Nabhisthan, there used to be flame over water. However, a flame house is located here. On 2028 BS, a flood on Paduka bridge vandalized flame. On the bank, all the inscriptions, Statues, Pillars and other historical ruins. Some believe, this place has a source of Kerosene. Yogi Naraharinath published in his studies that there were more than 108 values.

== Temple area ==
The background occupies Shiva, Bhairav, Gorakhnath, Buddha, Jain, Lakshminarayan, Ganesha, Machindranath, Shivaling are vandalized and unfulfilled. On the Naval of flame house there is auto flame. This area covers a worn hospice. Nearby it there is a tree of antique bead Rudraksha. Padukasthan is a wide library for the studies of early Khas Empire. Stone inscriptions of Shak Sambat 1136 and 1162 could be found here. Deval pillars of Khas king Sawn Karki Sauka Kakaryani written are located here.

== Major Festivals ==
In this temple the pilgrims and saints over here makes regular worship. On the first Tuesday of Jestha month and Bijayadashmi bhairaj is enlightened by holy flame lamp. Rice pudding (khir) is offered during Shrawan month to Lord Shiva. Similarly, on the day of Ghatasthapana, the first day of Dashain, holy flame is lightened to produce holy smoke. Every year, a new chariot is replaced during Maghe Purnima.

This place is highly dedicated for Shivaratri. At 2043 BS, this place was vandalized, as reconstructed in 2045. Again with the help of former Dailekh DDC, all the historical structures were rebuilt.
