= Bode, Nepal =

Coordinates: 27°41′29″N 85°23′18″E

Bode बोडे
- Municipality
- Interactive map of Bode
- Country: Nepal
- Province: Bagmati Province
- District: Bhaktapur District

Area
  - Total: 0.41 km^{2} (0.16 sq mi)

Population (2011)
  - Total: 6,364
  - Density: 16,000/km^{2} (40,000/sq mi)
  - Religions: Hindu Buddhism Christianity
- Time zone: UTC+5:45 (Nepal Time)

Bode is an ancient Newar city in the east corner of the Kathmandu Valley, Nepal, about eight miles from the capital city, Kathmandu.The city is famous for Biska Jatra and tongue piercing and Nilbharahi Naach. At the time of the 2011 Nepal census it had a population of 6,364 with 1,389 houses.

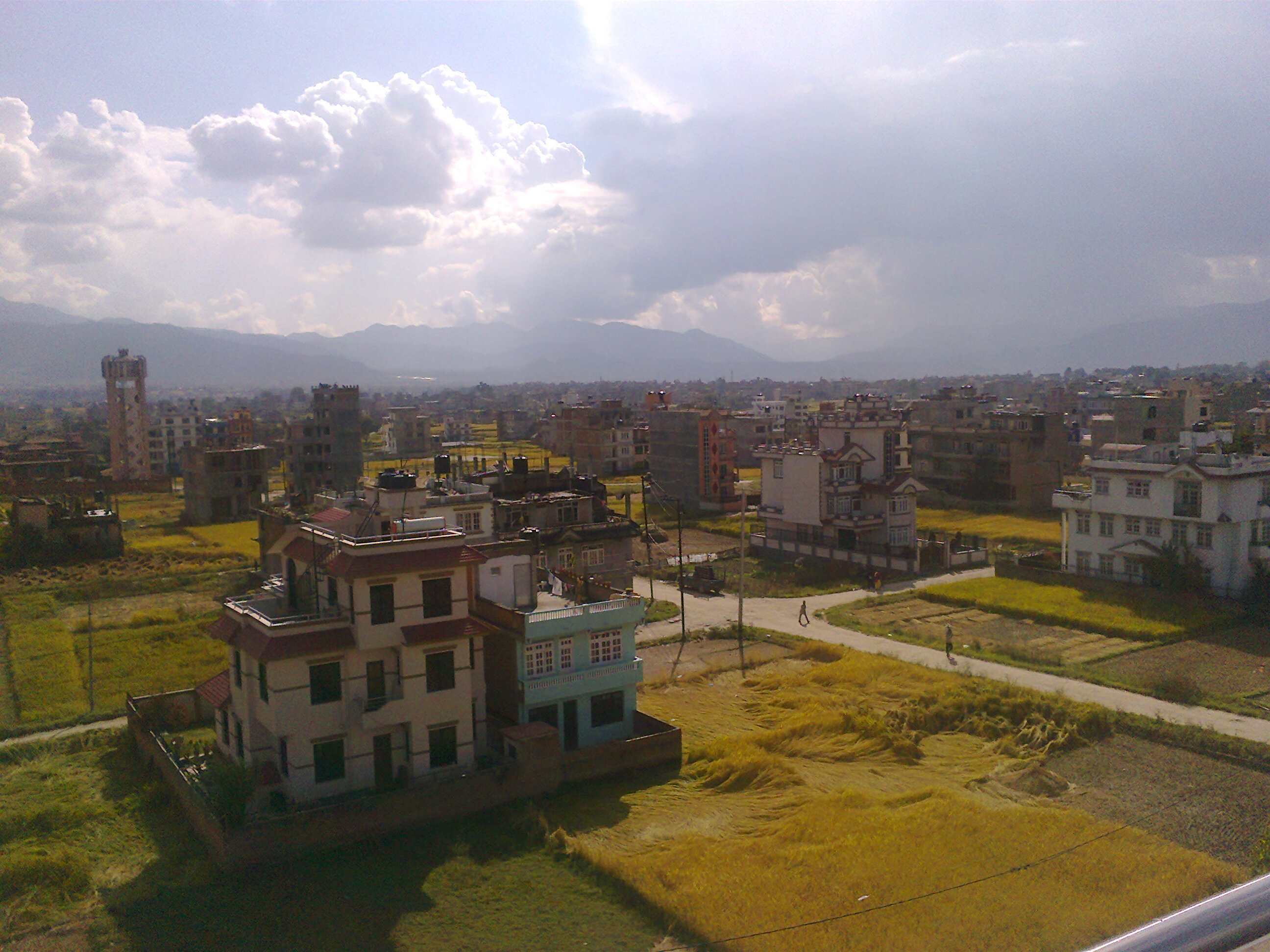
Bode West

== Bode Planning, Bhaktapur, Nepal ==
Bode Planning (area approximately 69 acres) is a small planned area located in the Bode, Bhaktapur of Nepal. Mostly the people from outer valley are living here. The office of "Agriculture Training Center" is located in this place.

== Bode as Agriculture ==
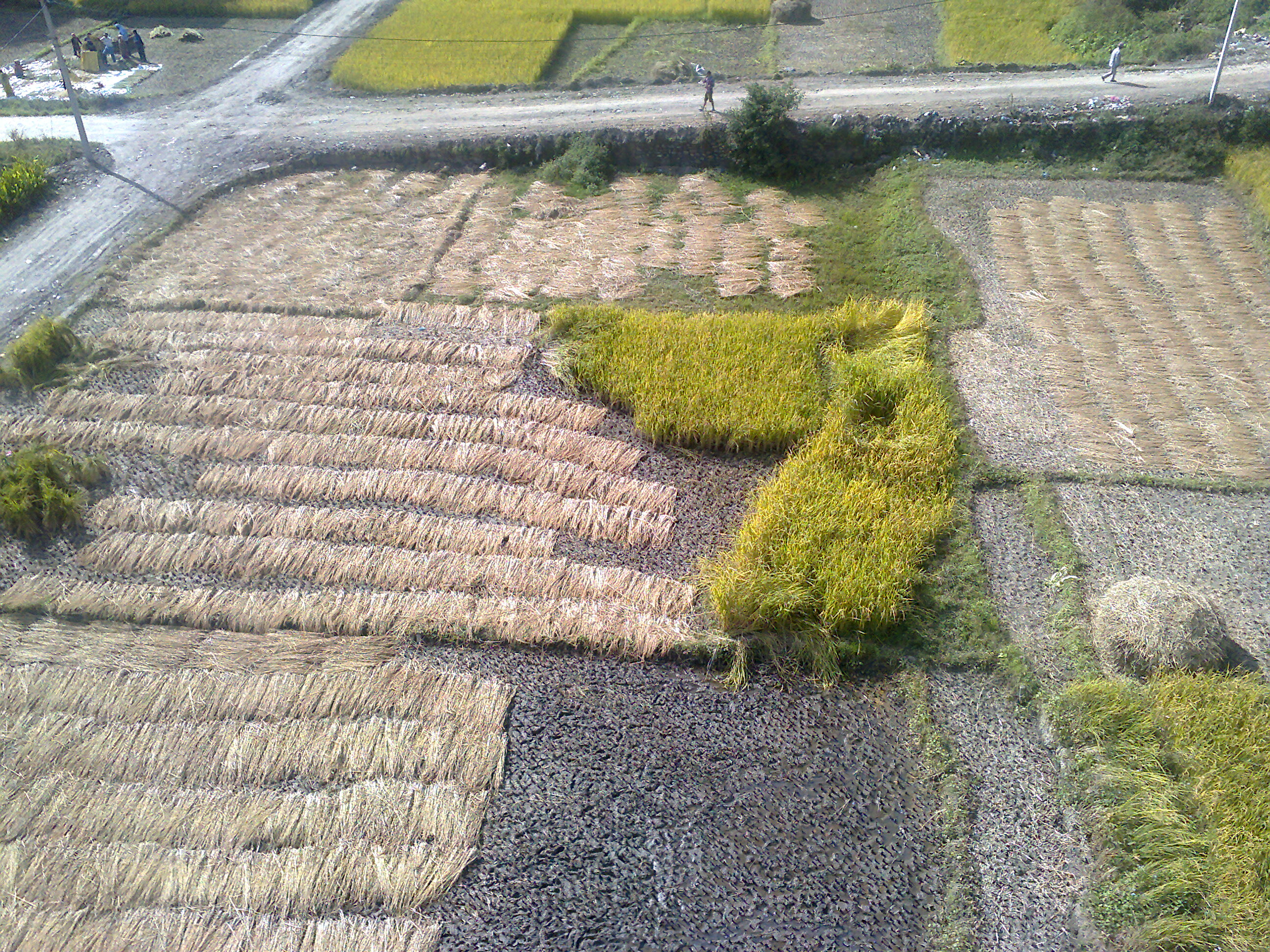
Paddy - Bode

Most of the people in Bode work in agriculture, including horticulture and animal husbandry. Rice is the most common agricultural crop. Other crops are Maize and Vegetables.

== Festivals ==
Bode is also known as city of festivals and celebrations. The city celebrates festivals each month starting from new year to the Holi puni at the end of the year.

- Biska jatra (New year festival)
- Mother's Day (Mathathirtha Aunshi)
- Buddha purnima (Buddha purnima)
- Kumar Khasti (Sithi Nakha)
- Gathamaga charya
- Sa: Paaru (Gai Jatra)
- Neel Barahi Naach
- Father's day (Kushe Aushi)
- Pulu Kisi (Indra Jatra)
- Dashain (Nawaratri)
- Tihar (Kija puja, Mha puja)
- Sakima punhi
- Dhanya purnima (Yomari purnima)
- Maghe sankranti (Ghya-chaku sankranti) (Makar Sankranti)
- Shree panchami
- Shiva ratri
- Holi (Holi purnima)
- Karkat sakranti (celebrated on Shrawan 1 of Nepali Calendar)
