= Tundal Devi Temple =

Hindu temple in Kathmandu, Nepal

- टुँडाल देवी मन्दिर

Religion
- Affiliation: Hiduism

Location
- Location: Kathmandu
- Country: Nepal
- Interactive map of Tundal Devi Temple
- Coordinates: 27.726705°N 85.333055°E

Tundal Devi Temple is a Hindu temple located in Baluwatar, Kathmandu, Nepal. The temple is built in three stories with a pagoda style roof. It was built in the Licchavi period. Every year a Jatra is organized in Gahanapokhari to search the lost jewels of Tudaldevi. According to the legend, Tudaldevi lost her jewels while swimming in the pond with her sisters Mahalaxmi, Manamaiju, and Nuwakotdevi.
