= Badalamji =

Badalamji बडलम्जी
- Location in Nepal प्रदेशनं: ६
- Coordinates: 28.90°N 81.62°E
- Country: Nepal
- Zone: Bheri Zone
- District: Dailekh District प्रशिद्ध स्थान : पाँच तिर्थ पन्चकोशीको एक महत्त्वपूर्ण स्थान धुलेस्वर, बालेस्वर, जिउलो आकर्षण: नेपालको लोपोन्मुख जाति राउटेको प्रमुख बासिस्थान, दुर्लभ चुडेरि भासा, हातले बनाएको चुडा

Population (2010)
  - Total: 7,023
- Time zone: UTC+5:45 (Nepal Time)

Badalamji is a village and market center Dullu Municipality in Dailekh District in the Bheri Zone of western-central Nepal. The formerly village development committee was annexed to the municipality from 18 May 2014. At the time of the 1991 Nepal census it had a population of 4177 people living in 806 individual households.
