= Naule Katuwal =

Naule Katuwal नौली कटुवाल
- Location in Nepal
- Coordinates: 28.82°N 81.57°E
- Country: Nepal
- Zone: Bheri Zone
- District: Dailekh District

Population (1991)
  - Total: 2,935
- Time zone: UTC+5:45 (Nepal Time)

Naule Katuwal is a village and market center Dullu Municipality in Dailekh District in the Bheri Zone of western-central Nepal. The formerly village development committee was annexed to the municipality from 18 May 2014. At the time of the 1991 Nepal census it had a population of 2935 people living in 591 individual households.
