= Jal Binayak Temple =

Hindu temple in Nepal

- जलविनायक जलविनायक मन्दिर
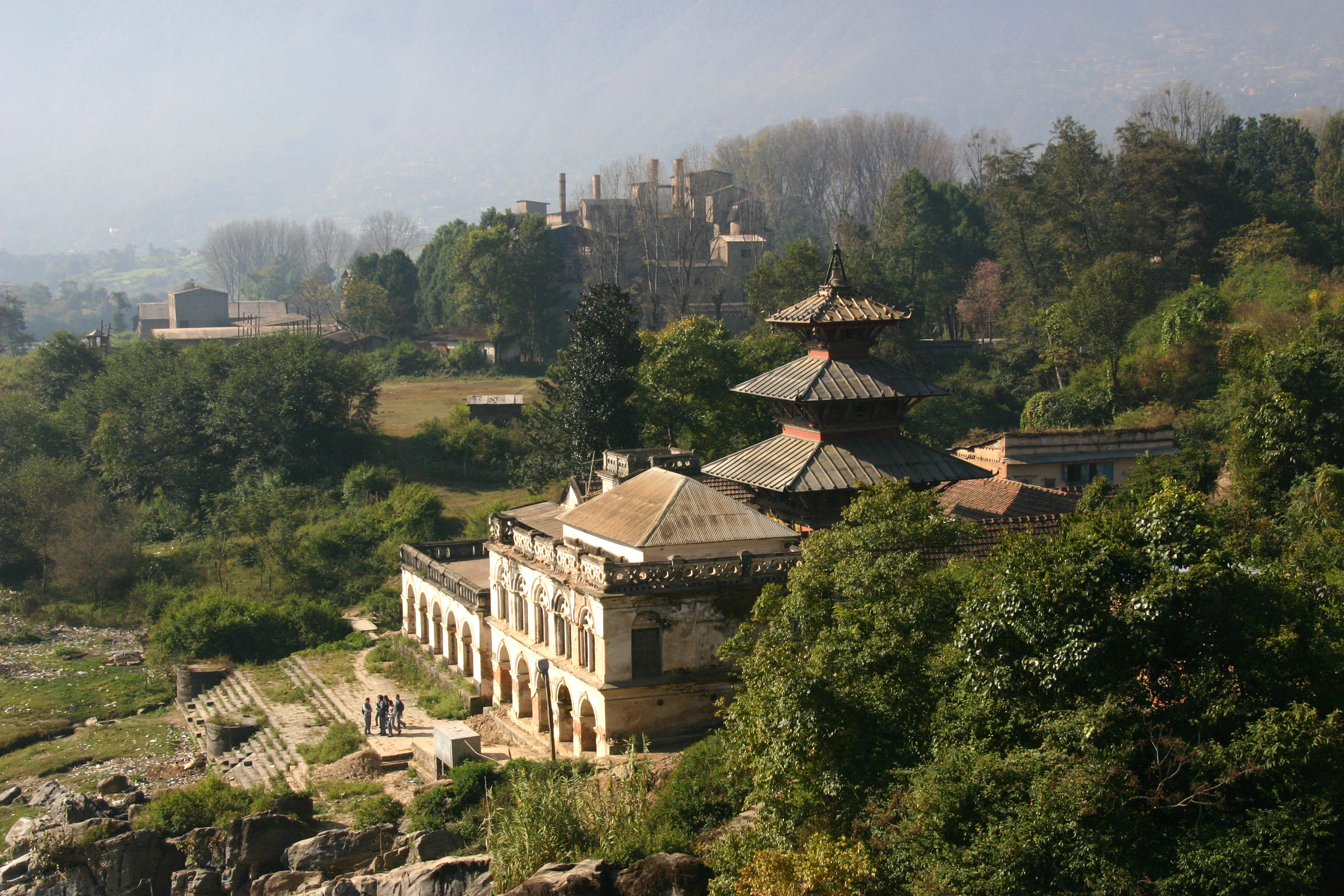

- Location in Kathmandu

Religion
- Affiliation: Hinduism
- District: Kathmandu
- Deity: Ganesh
- Festival: Ganesh Chaturthi

Location
- Location: Chobhar
- Country: Nepal
- Coordinates: 27°39′30″N 85°17′36″E

Architecture
- Type: Pagoda

Jal Binayak (Nepali: जलविनायक) is a Hindu Temple of Lord Ganesh located in the Chobhar, central part of Kathmandu District, Nepal. The Jal Binayak temple is the most important Ganesh shrine of the central region Kathmandu. It is one of the four Binayak of Kathmandu Valley.

== History ==
The temple was built initially in 723 NS) by Malla King Shiva Singh Malla. After 83 year the Gajur was added to the top of the temple in 789 NS by Malla King Sri Nivas Malla of Patan. The present structure of the temple was reconstructed in Pagoda Style in 871 NS by King Rajya Prakash Malla of Kathmandu.

Jal Binayak is one of the four original Ganesh of Kathmandu valley. The other three Ganesh shrines being Chandra Binayak, Surya Binayak and Ashok Binayak. Additionally, there are other Ganesh temples like Kamal Binayak and Karya Binayak which are also popular Ganesh temples situated inside the valley.

== Gallery ==
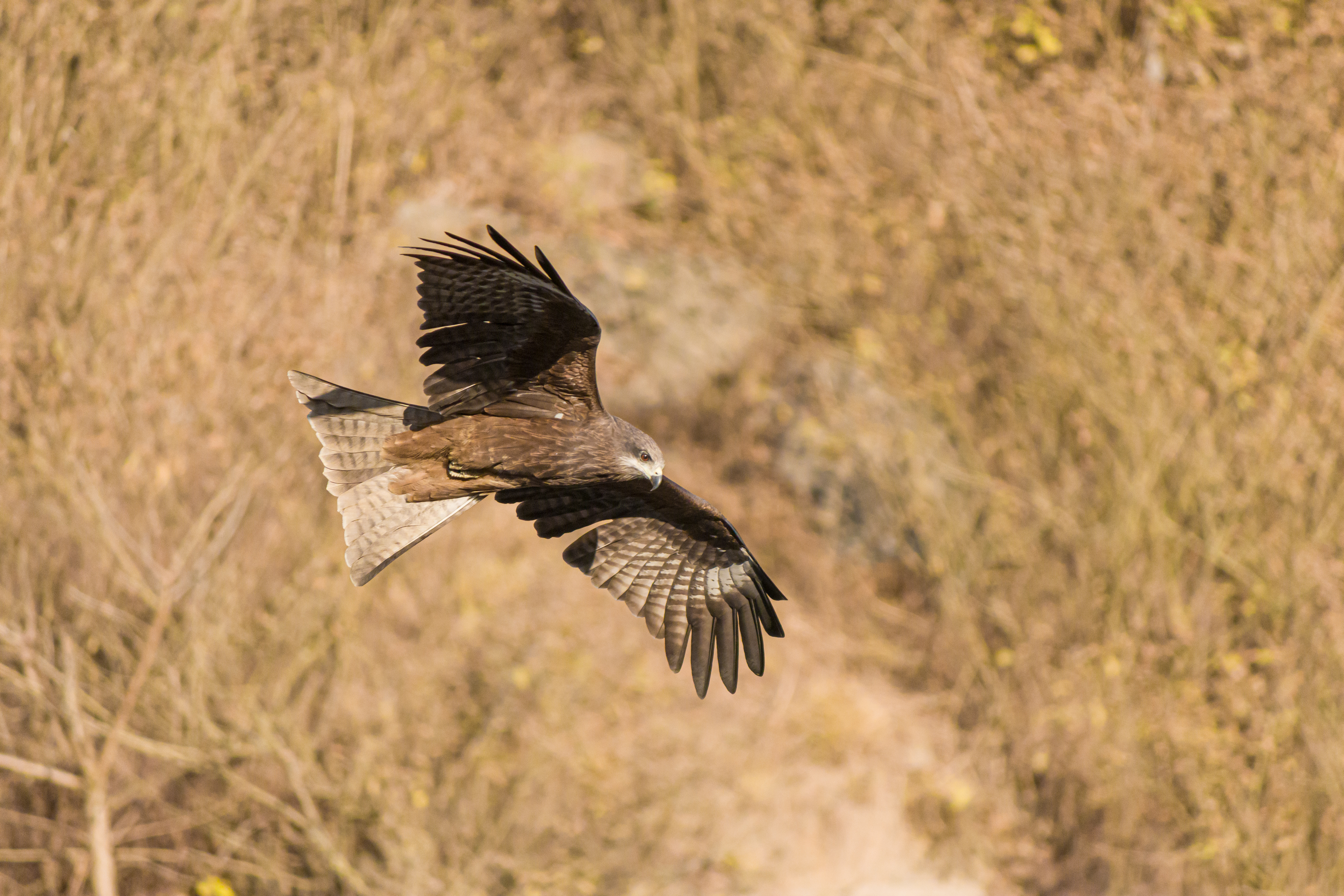
Black kite flying over Bagmati River, Jal Binayak, Kathmandu
