= Bhagwati Temple =

Hindu temple in Nepal

- Chandi Bhagwati Mandir
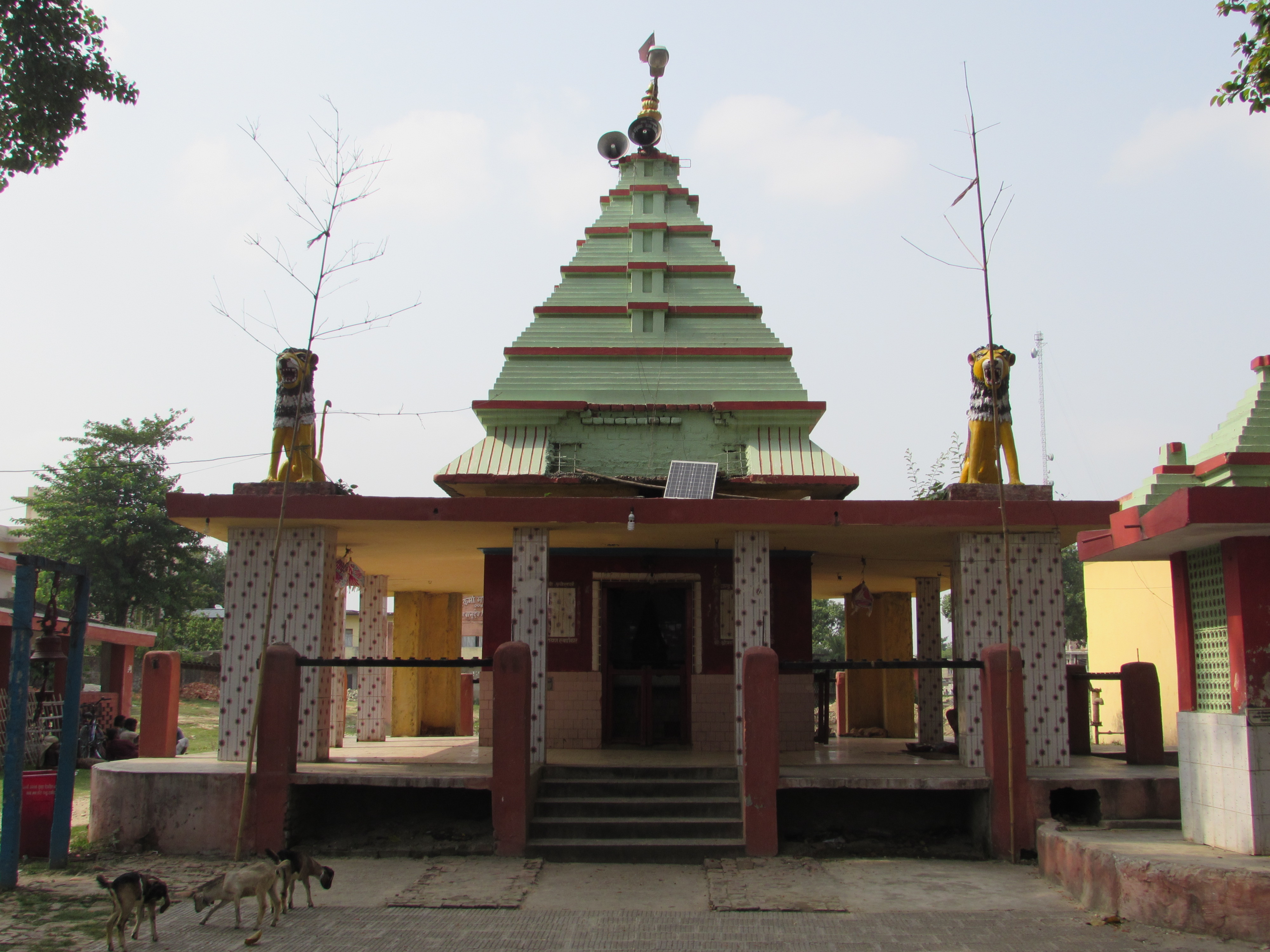
- Chandi Bhagwati Temple full view

- Chandi Bhagwati Temple in Nepal

Religion
- Affiliation: Hinduism
- District: Saptari
- Deity: The goddess Bhagwati
- Festival: Bada Dashain

Location
- Location: Rajbiraj
- State: Madhesh
- Country: Nepal
- Interactive map of Bhagwati Temple
- Coordinates: 26.5407°N 86.7475°E

Architecture
- Completed: 1925

Specifications
- Temple: 1
- Monument: 7
- Elevation: 76 m (249 ft)

Bhagwati Temple or Chandi Bhagwati Temple (Nepali language:चण्डी भगवती मन्दिर) is a famous Hindu temple situated in the heart of Rajbiraj, Saptari. This temple, whose major deity goddess is Chandi Bhagavati is a main attraction for Nepali and Indian pilgrims. People are likely to come here during Bada Dashain. Some thousands of goats are sacrificed here during Dashain. The temple complex holds many Hindu god and goddess temples like Balaji Hanuman Temple, Shiva Temple and Bishwakarma Temple. A small pond Bhagwati Pokhari is located backside of the temple, where Chhath is performed every year.

== History ==
The temple holds great historical, cultural, and religious significance in the local and neighboring area. The temple was built in 1925 and expanded over the years. The main priest of the temple is Durganand Mishra, who has been working here since 2002.

== Pilgrimage ==
Every year, thousands of pilgrims from Nepal, India, and other countries visit this sacred temple to worship the Bhagawati. During the festivals of Dashain and Tihar, there is presence of even more worshipers.
