= Patarasi Rural Municipality =

Patarasi पातारासी
- Rural municipality
- Location in Nepal
- Coordinates: 28.42°N 82.32°E
- Country: Nepal
- Province: Karnali
- District: Jumla
- No. of wards: 7
- Established: 10 March 2017

Government
  - Type: Rural council
  - Chairperson: Mr. Purna singh Bohora (NC)
  - Vice-chairperson: Mrs. Janamaya Rokaya (NCP)

Area
  - Total: 814.07 km^{2} (314.31 sq mi)
  - Rank: 17th largest RM (in country); 5th largest (in province)

Population (2011)
  - Total: 14,571
  - Density: 17.899/km^{2} (46.358/sq mi)
- Time zone: UTC+5:45 (NST)
- Headquarters: Dillichaur
- Website: official website

Patarasi (Nepali: पातारासी) is a rural municipality located in Jumla District of Karnali Province of Nepal.

The total area of the rural municipality is 814.07 square kilometres (314.31 sq mi) and the total population of the rural municipality as of 2011 Nepal census is 14,571 individuals. The rural municipality is divided into total 7 wards.

According to the previous administrative structure Patarasi was a Village development committee before 10 March 2017. Patarasi rural municipality came into existence on 10 March 2017, when Government of Nepal restricted all old administrative structure and announced 744 local level units (although the number increased to 753 later) as per the new constitution of Nepal 2015.

Chhumchaur, Dillichaur and Patmara Village development committees were incorporated with Patarasi village development committee to form the new Patarasi rural municipality. The headquarters of the municipality is situated at Dillichaur.

== History ==
According to previous structure Patarasi was a village development committee in Jumla District in the Karnali Zone of north-western Nepal. At the time of the 1991 Nepal census it had a population of 2279 persons living in 371 individual households.
