= Deusi/Bhailo =

Nepalese folk tradition during Tihar

Deusi-Bhailo देउसी-भैलो
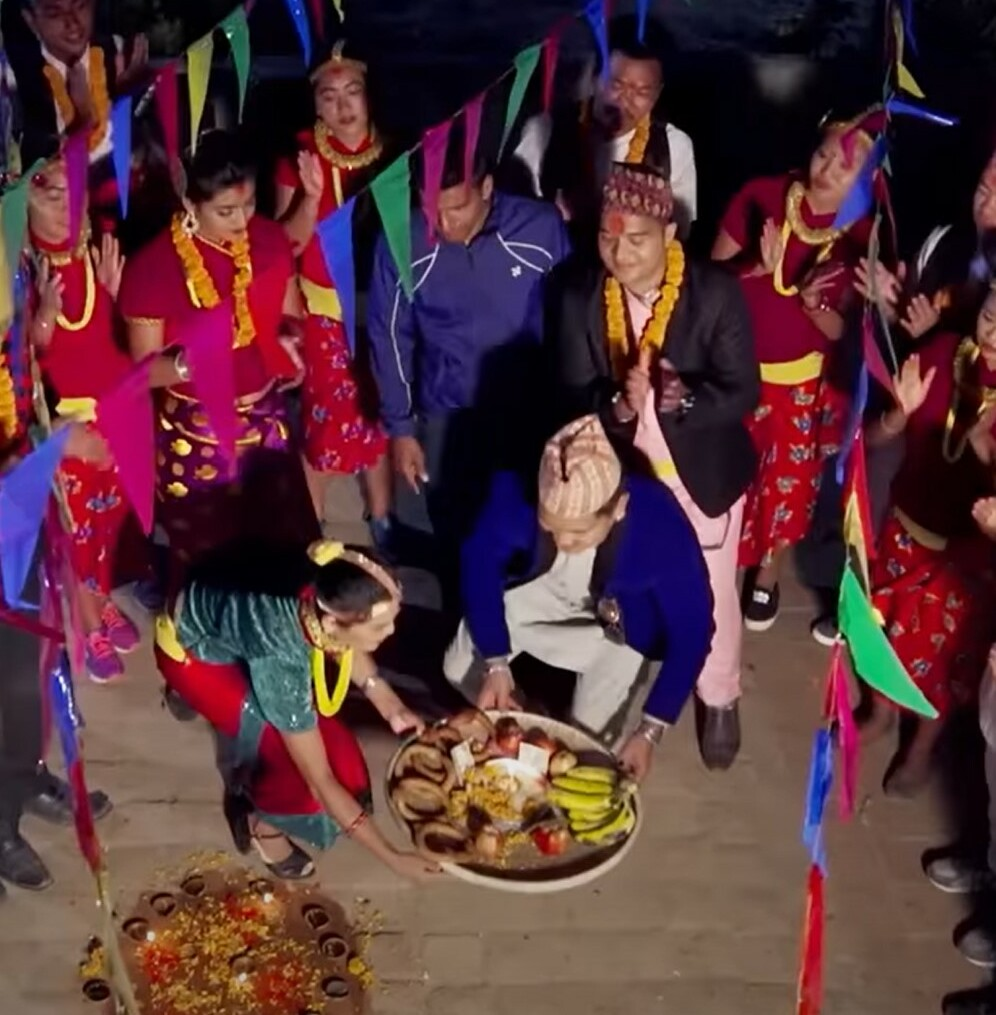
- Deusi-Bhailo performers accepting gifts from the householder
- Genre: Nepali folk music
- Date: Tihar
- Frequency: Annual
- Country: Nepal, and regions with large Nepalese populations

Deusi and Bhailo, collectively known as Deusi-Bhailo (Nepali: देउसी-भैलो), are traditional Nepali folk music performed during the five-day festival of Tihar in Nepal and also during weddings in western Nepal, also among the Nepalese diaspora and regions with large Nepalese populations. During the festival, groups of children and adults visit homes in their neighbourhood, singing songs, dancing, and offering blessings in exchange for gifts such as money, sweets, and traditional foods.

Traditionally, Bhailo is performed by girls and women on the night of Lakshmi Puja, while Deusi is performed by boys and men the next night. Although, in modern practice, mixed groups perform it collectively on one or both nights.

The participants, performing Bhailo, are called Bhailini, while the participants performing Deusi are called Deuse. At the end of their performances, householders offer food and money. In return, the performers give blessings for prosperity, happiness, and good fortune.

== Origin stories ==
There exists two major stories about the origin of the practice of performing Deusi/Bhailo. The stories varies according to the places and ethnic groups. The two stories are given as:

=== Vamana and Bali ===
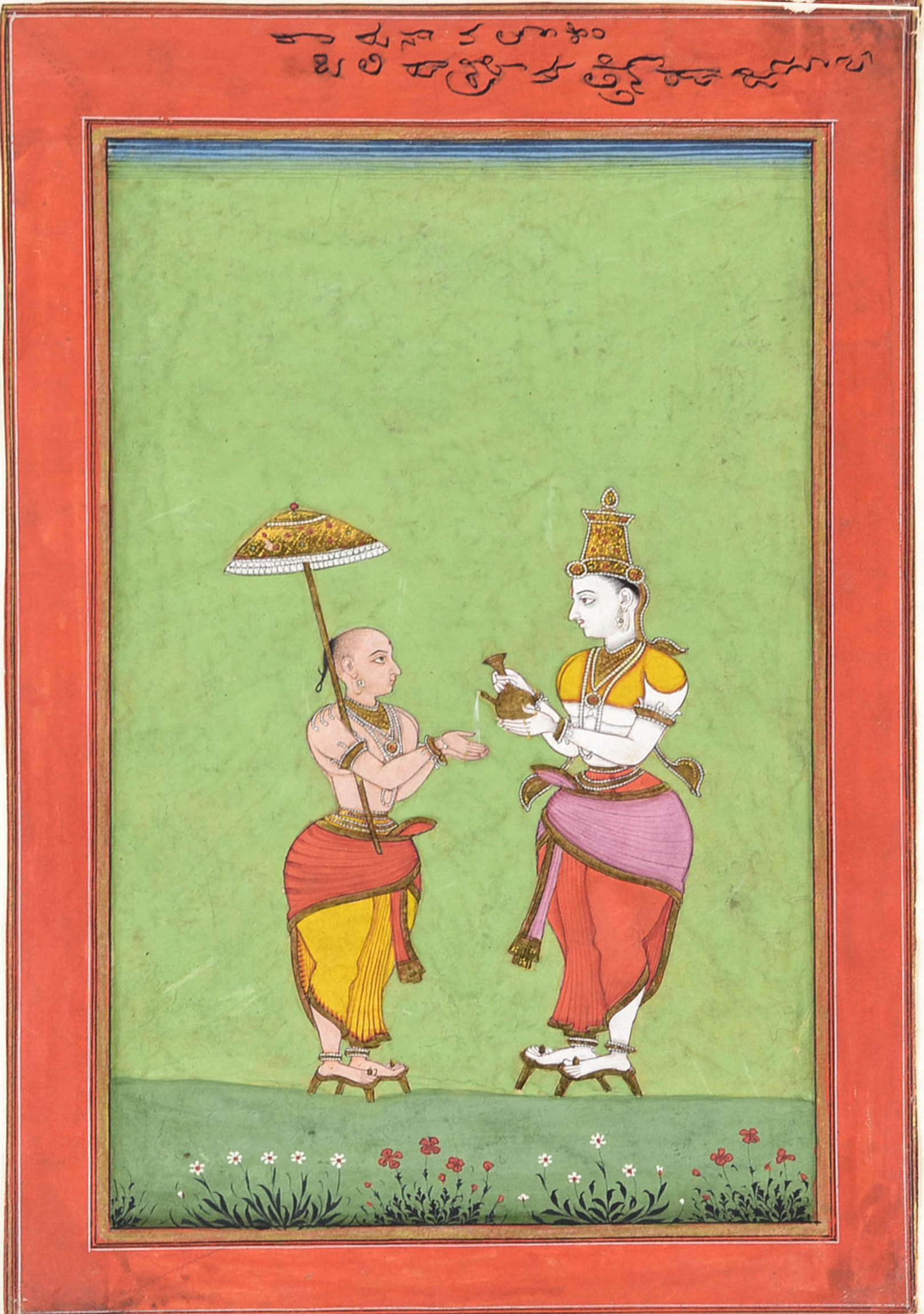
Vamana being blessed by King Bali

According to Hindu mythology, King Mahabali, the great grandson of Hiranyakashipu, the grandson of Prahlada and the son of Virochana was a very generous and intelligent Daitya king of Patala. He once defeated Devas and their king Indra and claimed the throne of Devaloka (heaven). The Devas then went to Lord Vishnu seeking help. After his victory, King Bali decided to perform Ashvamedha ritual. While the ritual was being performed, Lord Vishnu appeared before Bali in his dwarf priest avatar, Vamana. It was customary to donate to a priest or sage during rituals. So, the king asked Vamana to make his wish. Vamana asked for three feet of land. King Bali agreed to donate three feet of land to the Vamana priest.

Vamana placed his first step but he began to expand in size. He became so big that his single foot covered the whole Earth. The second step covered the Devaloka (heaven). There was no place for Vamana to place his third step. So, the king offered his own head to Vamana to place the third step. As Vamana placed his foot on Bali's head, Bali collapsed back to Patala Loka (subterranean realms). King Bali then asked a wish with Vamana, to be able to ascend to Mṛtyuloka (the world of the dead). Lord Vishnu allowed King Bali to be able to ascend to Mṛtyuloka for five days on Yama Panchak.

The people then started performing Deusi in honour of Mahabali's generosity. The word Deusire is said to originated from the words Deu and sire, translating to give and head, in Nepali language. In Bhailo too, a verse in the song refers to King Bali.

=== Baliraja of Jumla ===
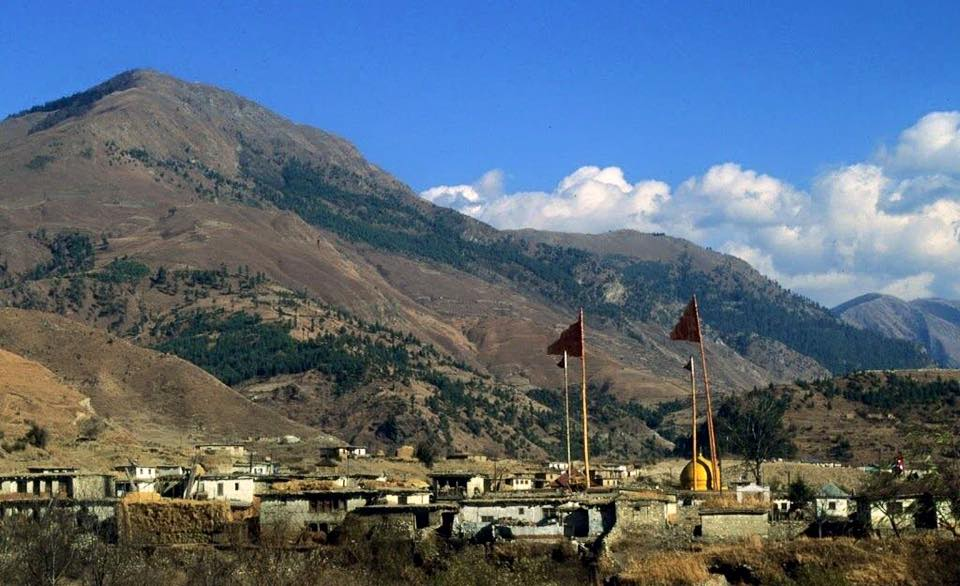
Chandannath Temple, Jumla

According to another story, there once lived a pregnant woman and she arrived in a place named Kallai in the present day Jumla district of Nepal. According to Jagaman Gurung, a cultural expert, the woman might have been involved in an incest or other taboo activity and hence fled her home and arrived in Kallai. Later, the woman gave birth to a son named Bali. The Khas reign in Jumla had fallen and there was no ruler. One day, a sage named Chandannath arrived at that place and found Bali to be worthy as a ruler. He declared Bali as the king of Jumla. Bali's dynasty later became the Kallala dynasty. During his rule, slavery was practiced. Poor people would sacrifice their children at the temple. But later the practice changed and people would offer their children to the temple to live as Devdas (lit. male slave of god) and Devdasi (lit. female slave of god). Once every year, the king would permit the Devdas and Devdasi to visit the village and receive offering from them. So, the Devdasi went to sing 'Bhailo' (from the Nepali word Bhalo, meaning wellness) and the Devdas would sing 'Devdas Re'. The practice later become the Deusi/Bhailo tradition.

Another variation of the legend attributes the origin of the tradition to the battle between Baliraja of Jumla and Timur during the 14th century. After defeat of Baliraja in the war, the song and dance is said to have performed to collect taxes from the people by the king.

== Performance ==
The Deusi/Bhailo programme provides cultural entertainment by a group of men and/or women who move around their local area singing the Deusi/Bhailo song and other songs. The group is usually composed of a lead chanter/singer and a chorus group and sometimes additional participants such as musicians and dancers. The lead chanter/singer wishes blessings upon the owners of the house where the team visits. Traditionally, the programme is all live and uses minimal electronic instruments. The entire programme can last from about 10 minutes to half an hour in one house. Then the group moves to another location to perform.

The programme is held on the third and fourth days of Tihar, where Bhailo is performed on the third day (Laxmi Puja) and Deusi is performed on the fourth day (Gowardhan Puja).

== Lyrics ==
During Deusi/Bhailo, children as well as adults visit the houses in their neighbourhood and villages, The songs sung during Deusi/Bhailo are mostly blessings for the house owner. The singers sing about the hardship they endured to reach the house and give blessing to the house owner. The lyrics may also contain humorous reference to house owner.

In the Deusi performance, a leader of the group sings the main line whereas other members repeat "Deusi Re" after each line. In the Bhailo performance, the whole group sings in a unison.

A typical Bhailo verse is given as:

"हरियो गोबरले लिपेको, लक्ष्मी पूजा गरेको
हे! औंसीको बारो, गाई तिहारो भैलो
हामी त्यसै आएनौँ, बलि राजाले पठा'को
हे! औंसीको बारो, गाई तिहारो भैलो " (In Devanagari)

Hariyo gobar le lipeko, Laxmi–Pooja gareko
Hey Aunsi ko baro Gai–Tihar ho Bhailo
Hami tesai ayenau, Bali raja le pathako
Hey Aunsi ko baro Gai–Tihar ho Bhailo (in Nepali)

[The floor polished with green dung, Laxmi–Pooja being performed
Oh, on the new moon night, on the day of the festival of cows, performing Bhailo
We didn't came on a whim, we were sent by King Bali
Oh, on the new moon night, on the day of the festival of cows, performing Bhailo] (English translation)
