= Sinja Rural Municipality =

Rural municipality in Karnali, Nepal

Sinja सिंजा
- Rural municipality
- Location in Nepal
- Coordinates: 29.34°N 82.02°E
- Country: Nepal
- Province: Karnali
- District: Jumla
- No. of wards: 6
- Established: 10 March 2017

Government
  - Type: Rural council
  - Chairperson: Mr. Deval Singh Rawal (NC)
  - Vice-chairperson: Mrs. Janmkanya Khatri (NCP)

Area
  - Total: 153.29 km^{2} (59.19 sq mi)

Population (2011)
  - Total: 12,395
  - Density: 80.860/km^{2} (209.43/sq mi)
- Time zone: UTC+5:45 (NST)
- Headquarters: Narakot
- Website: official website

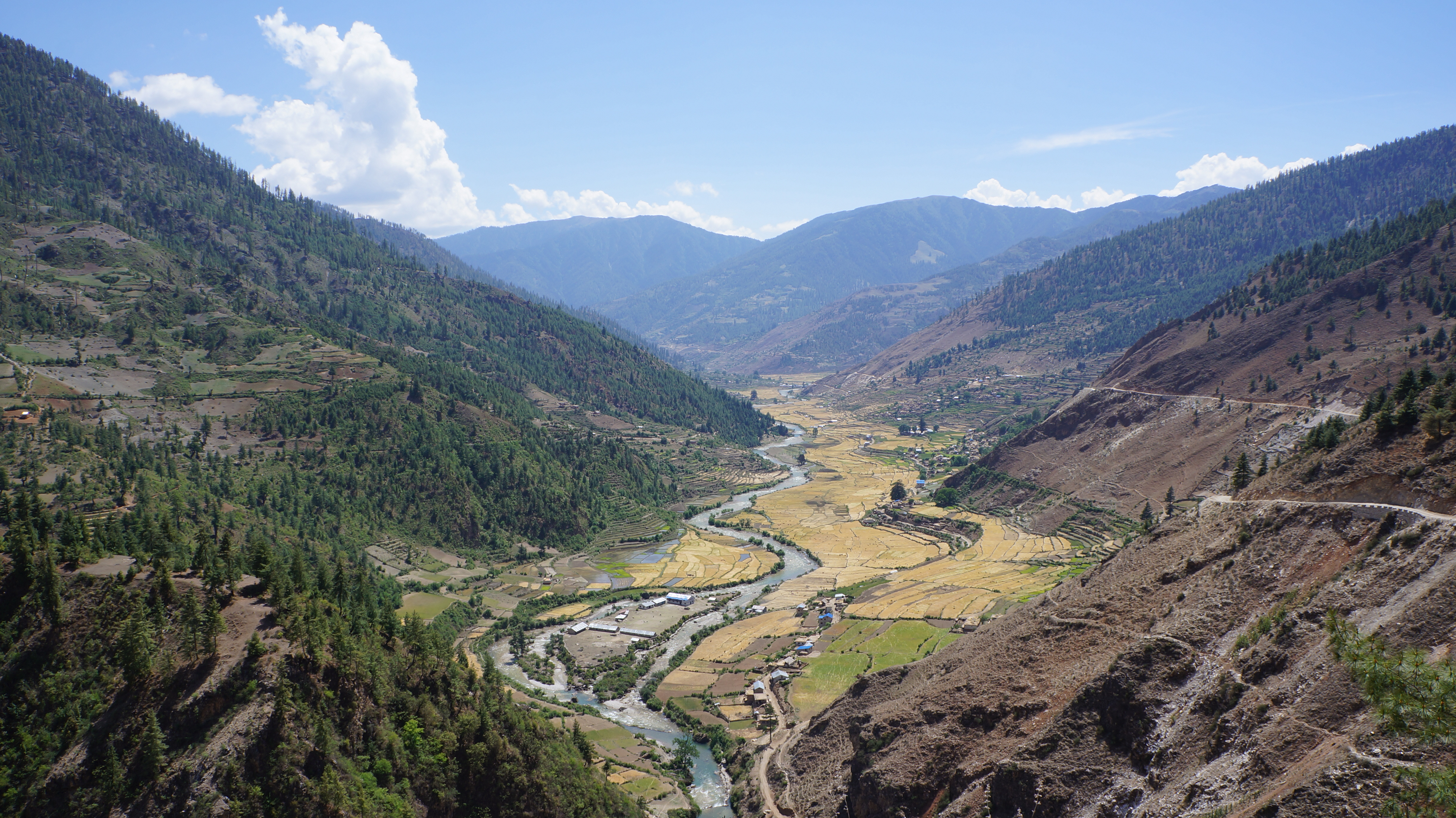
Sinja Valley

Sinja (Nepali: सिंजा) is a rural municipality located in Jumla District of Karnali Province of Nepal.

The total area of the rural municipality is 153.29 square kilometres (59.19 sq mi) and the total population of the rural municipality as of 2011 Nepal census is 12,395 individuals. The rural municipality is divided into total 6 wards.

Sinja rural municipality came into existence on 10 March 2017, when Government of Nepal restricted all old administrative structure and announced 744 local level units (although the number increased to 753 later) as per the new constitution of Nepal 2015.

Dhapa, Sanigaun and Narakot Village development committees were Incorporated to form the new Sinja rural municipality. The headquarters of the municipality is situated at Narakot.
