= Tatopani =

Tatopani may refer to several places in Nepal:

- Tatopani, Jumla, Karnali
  - Tatopani (village), Jumla, Karnali
- Tatopani, Myagdi
- Tatopani, Sindhupalchok
- Tatopani, Surkhet
