= Talium =

Talium तालियुम
- Location in Nepal
- Coordinates: 29.29°N 82.12°E
- Country: Nepal
- Zone: Karnali Zone
- District: Jumla District

Population (1991)
  - Total: 3,245
- Time zone: UTC+5:45 (Nepal Time)

Talium is a market center in Chandannath Municipality in Jumla District in the Karnali Zone of north-western Nepal. The formerly village development committee was merged with existing Mahat Gaun, Talium, Kartik Swami, Chandannath village development committees to form the new municipality. At the time of the 1991 Nepal census it had a population of 3245 persons living in 585 individual households.
