= Depalgaun =

Depalgaun देपालगाउँ
- Municipality
- Location in Nepal
- Coordinates: 29.23°N 82.24°E
- Country: Nepal
- Zone: Karnali Zone
- District: Jumla District

Population (1991)
  - Total: 1,697
- Time zone: UTC+5:45 (Nepal Time)

Depalgaun is a village development committee in Jumla District in the Karnali Zone of north-western Nepal. At the time of the 1991 Nepal census it had a population of 1697 persons living in 304 individual households.
