= Daibagya Balbhadra Joshi =

Nepalese astronomer

Daibagya Balbhadra Joshi (1494 AD), also known as Balbharda of Jumla, was an astronomer of Nepal. He was born in Jumla district. He wrote commentary of Bhaswati. The original book of Bhashwati was written by Satananda in 1099 in Orissaas. The Bhashwati helped to prepare Panchang and to solve mathematical problems of addition, subtraction, multiplication and division.
