= Tamti =

Tamti ताम्ती बाङ्गे डाँडा
- तातोपानी
- Location in Nepal
- Coordinates: 29.09°N 82.09°E
- Country: Nepal
- Zone: Karnali Zone
- District: Jumla District

Population (1991)
  - Total: 2,491
- Time zone: UTC+5:45 (Nepal Time)

Tamti is a village development committee in Jumla District in the Karnali Zone of north-western Nepal. At the time of the 1991 Nepal census it had a population of 2491.
