= Labhra =

Labhra लाभ्रा
- village development committee
- Location in Nepal
- Coordinates: 29.26°N 82.10°E
- Country: Nepal
- Zone: Karnali Zone
- District: Jumla District

Population (1991)
  - Total: 2,053
- Time zone: UTC+5:45 (Nepal Time)

Labhra is a village development committee in Jumla District in the Karnali Zone of north-western Nepal. At the time of the 1991 Nepal census, it had a population of 2053 persons living in 380 individual households.
