= Garjyangkot =

Garjyangkot गर्ज्याङकोट
- Municipality
- Location in Nepal
- Coordinates: 29.27°N 82.24°E
- Country: Nepal
- Zone: Karnali Zone
- District: Jumla District

Population (1991)
  - Total: 2,854
- Time zone: UTC+5:45 (Nepal Time)

Garjyangkot is a village development committee in Jumla District in the Karnali Zone of north-western Nepal. At the time of the 1991 Nepal census it had a population of 2854 persons living in 492 individual households.
