= Bamramadichaur =

Place in Karnali Zone, Nepal

Bamramadichaur बम्रमाडीचौर
- Location in Nepal
- Coordinates: 29.41°N 82.13°E
- Country: Nepal
- Zone: Karnali Zone
- District: Jumla District

Population (1991)
  - Total: 1,139
- Time zone: UTC+5:45 (Nepal Time)

Bamramadichaur is a village development committee in Jumla District in the Karnali Zone of north-western Nepal. At the time of the 1991 Nepal census it had a population of 1139 persons living in 172 individual households.
