= Badki =

Badki बड्की
- Village development committee
- Location in Nepal
- Coordinates: 29.29°N 81.98°E
- Country: Nepal
- Zone: Karnali Zone
- District: Jumla District

Population (1991)
  - Total: 3,434
- Time zone: UTC+5:45 (Nepal Time)

Badki is a village development committee in Jumla District in the Karnali Zone of north-western Nepal. At the time of the 1991 Nepal census it had a population of 3434 persons living in 633 individual households.
