= Vautha fair =

Gathering in Gujarat, India

Vautha fair Vautha Fair
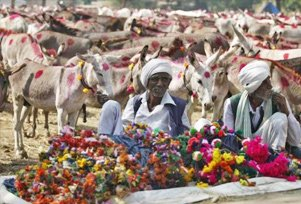
- Donkey market at Vautha Fair
- Genre: Cultural and religious festival
- Begins: Kartika Sud Ekadashi
- Ends: Kartika Sud Purnima
- Frequency: Annual
- Locations: Vautha Village, Ahmedabad district, Gujarat
- Country: India

Vautha fair is one of the important fairs held in Gujarat. Vautha is located on the border of Dholka taluka of Ahmedabad district and Matar taluka of Kheda district. Vautha fair is the largest fair in Ahmedabad district.

== Place ==
Vautha fair is held at Vautha village of Dholka taluka of Ahmedabad in Gujarat, India. The place of the fair is known as Saptasangam - the confluence of seven rivers. In fact, only the Sabarmati and Vatrak rivers meet at Vautha. These two rivers formerly meet the river at Sabarmati and the Khari, Meshwo, Mohar, Mazam and Shedhi rivers at Vatrak, hence the confluence of seven rivers here.

== Time ==
The fair is held from Kartika Sud Ekadashi to Kartika Sud Purnima (Dev Deepavali).

== History ==
The importance of this place in the center of Gujarat is in the Puranas. Viratnagar in the Mahabharata which is now in Dholka, where the Pandavas stayed to go into Agyatvas after a long exile of thirteen years.

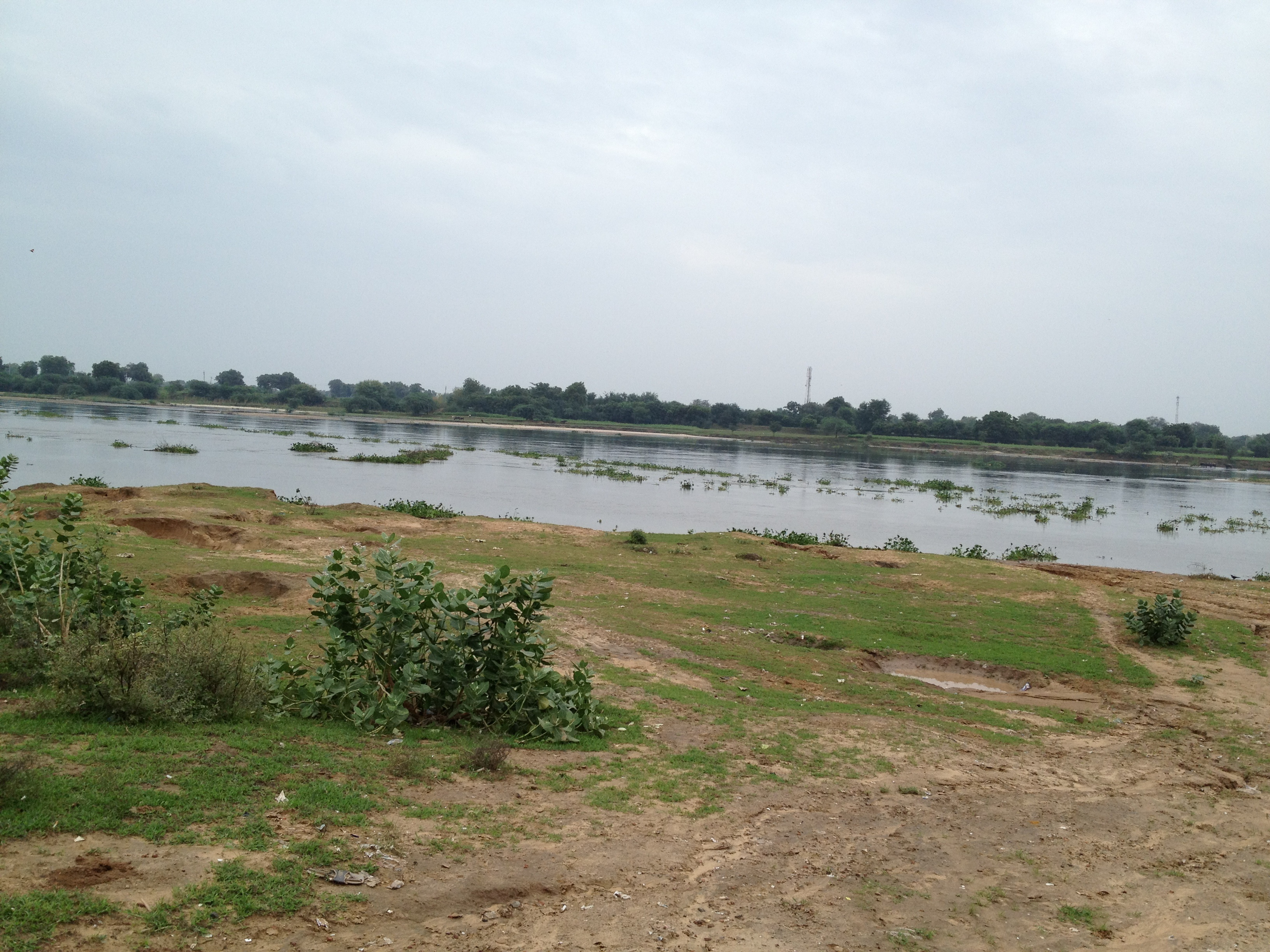
Sabarmati river view at proposed bridge location near Vautha - village

There are many myths about this ancient temple of Mahadev in Vautha that Kartik Swami, the eldest son of Lord Shankara, who travels all over the world, comes to bathe in the holy festival of Kartik Purnima. Kartik's Charanpaduka is still worshiped in Vautha.

== Importance ==
Bathing in Saptasangam on the day of Karthiki Purnima is considered very sacred and people experience spiritual bliss by bathing on that day. This fair of Vautha has many small and big shops, entertainment equipments, Madari(juggler), magicians, nuts(rope-dancer), bhavaiyas as well as circus, wheelbarrow etc. entertainment equipments. Apart from Bhajan Mandali at night, a cultural program is also organized by Taluka Panchayat Dholka.

People of Bhal and Nalkantha area as well as Thakor, Rana, Darbar, Kachhiya Patel and Rajput castes camp there and stay for two-three days.

== Donkey Market ==
The main attraction of this fair is the donkey market. The best and highest quality donkeys are brought here for sale, the Vanzara community brings more than four thousand donkeys for sale here. Camels are also traded at the Vautha fair. Donkeys are painted red, pink and orange on the neck and back.
