= Mahat Gaun =

Mahat Gaun महतगाउँ
- Municipality
- Location in Nepal
- Coordinates: 29.18°N 82.10°E
- Country: Nepal
- Zone: Karnali Zone
- District: Jumla District

Population (1991)
  - Total: 2,501
- Time zone: UTC+5:45 (Nepal Time)

Mahat Gaun is a market center in Chandannath Municipality in Jumla District in the Karnali Zone of north-western Nepal. The formerly village development committee was merged with Mahat Gaun, Talium, Kartik Swami, Chandannath village development committees to form the new municipality. At the time of the 1991 Nepal census it had a population of 2501 persons living in 496 individual households.

== Media ==
To Promote local culture Mahat Gaun has one FM radio station Radio Karnali 105.2 MHz Which is a Community radio Station.
