= Ghode Mahadev =

Ghode Mahadev घोडे महादेव
- Municipality
- Location in Nepal
- Coordinates: 29.18°N 81.94°E
- Country: Nepal
- Zone: Karnali Zone
- District: Jumla District

Population (1991)
  - Total: 2,058
- Time zone: UTC+5:45 (Nepal Time)

Ghode Mahadev is a village development committee in Jumla District in the Karnali Zone of north-western Nepal. At the time of the 1991 Nepal census it had a population of 2058.
