= Lihi, Nepal =

Coordinates: 29°14′N 81°58′E

Lihi, Nepal लिही
- Municipality
- Interactive map of Lihi, Nepal
- Country: Nepal
- Zone: Karnali Zone
- District: Jumla District

Population (1991)
  - Total: 2,397
- Time zone: UTC+5:45 (Nepal Time)

Lihi is a village development committee in Jumla District in the Karnali Zone of north-western Nepal. At the time of the 1991 Nepal census it had a population of 2397.
