= Chandannath Temple =

Hindu temple in Nepal

- चन्दननाथ मन्दिर
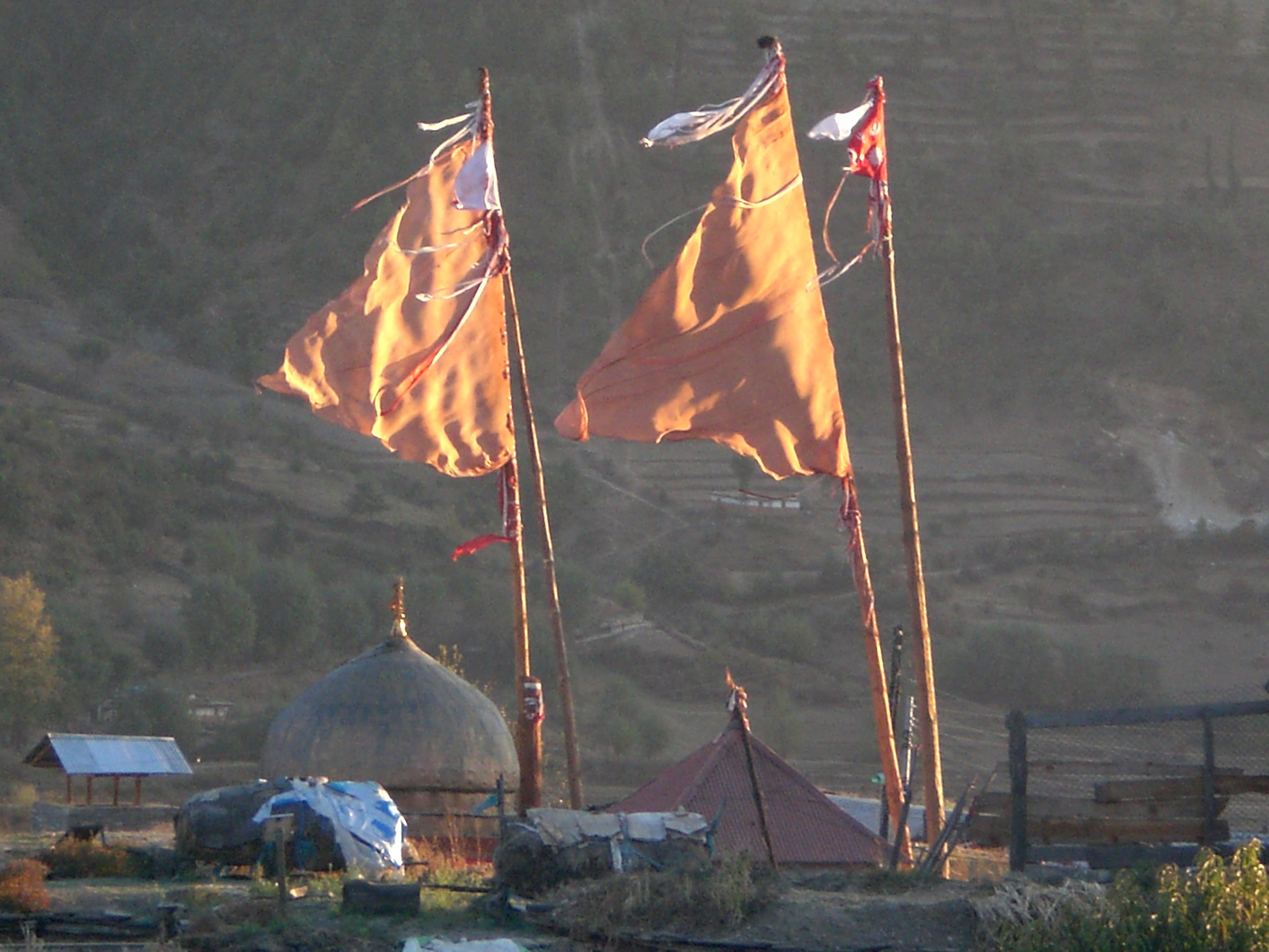
- Chandannath and Bhairabnath Temple during Ghatasthapana, when yearly-lingo replacement ceremony is held

- Location within Nepal

Religion
- Affiliation: Hinduism
- District: Jumla District
- Deity: Dattatreya

Location
- Location: Chandannath Municipality
- State: Karnali Province
- Country: Nepal
- Interactive map of Chandannath Temple
- Coordinates: 29°16′27.15″N 82°11′0.65″E

Architecture
- Elevation: 2,514 m (8,248 ft)

Chandannath Temple (/'ʧʌndʌn'nʌθ 'tɛmpl/; Nepali: चन्दननाथ मन्दिर) is a Hindu temple in Jumla, Nepal. It is located in Khalanga Bazar of Chandannath Municipality.

== History ==
It was built during the Kallala Dynasty also known as Kalal Dynasty. There are not many written documents about Kalyal Dynasty and Chandannath preserved. The events and lore had been passed orally for generations.

=== Chandannath Baba of Kashmir ===
People believe that there was a person named Chandannath who hailed from Kashmir, had brought the statue of the Dattatreya (also known as Trimurti). He kept the statue at the present location of the temple, prompting the construction during the Kallala Dynasty. Chandannath of Kashmir is also believed to be the one who had first introduced brown rice (मार्सी चामल) in Jumla after finding seasonal weathers of the place similar to that of Kashmir.

=== Cow offering milk at sacred place ===
Some local people also believe another story of the establishment of the temple. That is, once there was a Cow, which didn't give milk to her owner in the cowshed. But one day, when it stood above the place where now the temple exists, milk began to drop from its teats. Her owner saw that and told all the villagers. People believed that the place was sacred as Cow was offering its milk. Then, they established this temple at the very holy place.

== Practices ==
In this temple, local people change lingo every year. The lingo is a timber whose length is approximately more than 52 feet which are colored with brick red color and a huge cloth is stitched around it, which makes it looks like a triangular flag. People strongly believe that something wrong is going to happen if that lingo is broken during the change. This lingo replacement ceremony is held during Ghatasthapana, which is the first day of Dashain. During this day, the temple is crowded with devotees.

A large number of people are also seen in the temple on the occasion of Krishna Janmashtami, Maha Shivaratri and other major Hindu Festival.

== Photo Gallery ==
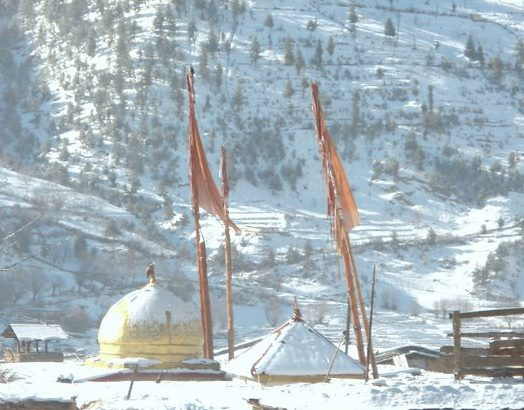
Chandannath and Bhairabnath Temple after heavy snowfall

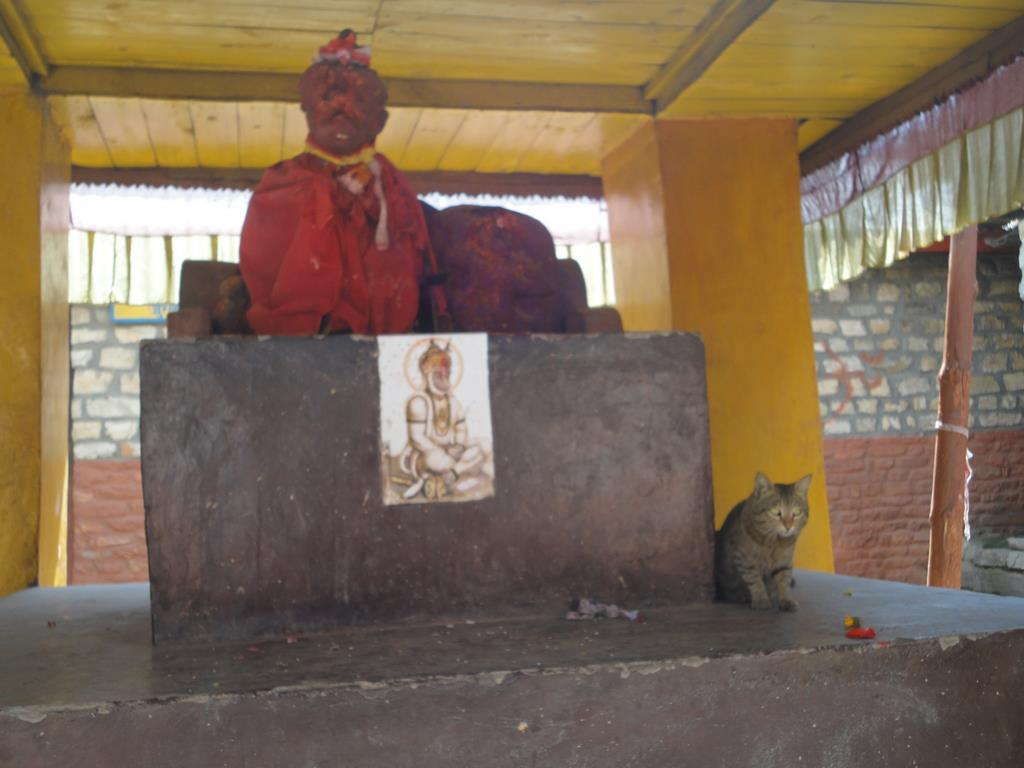
Hanuman Temple beside Chandannath Temple

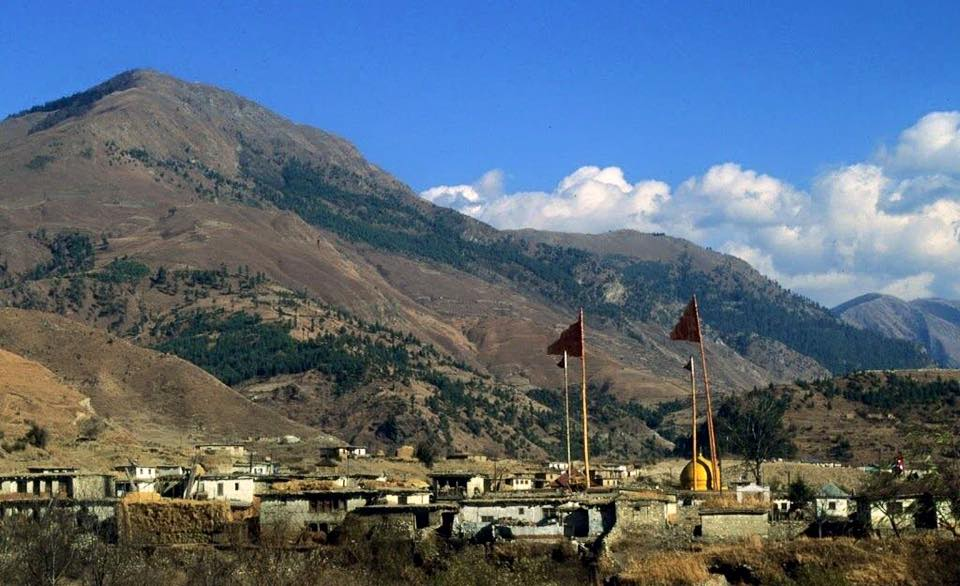
Photo by Johan Reinhard, National Geographic Society captured on 1995 AD

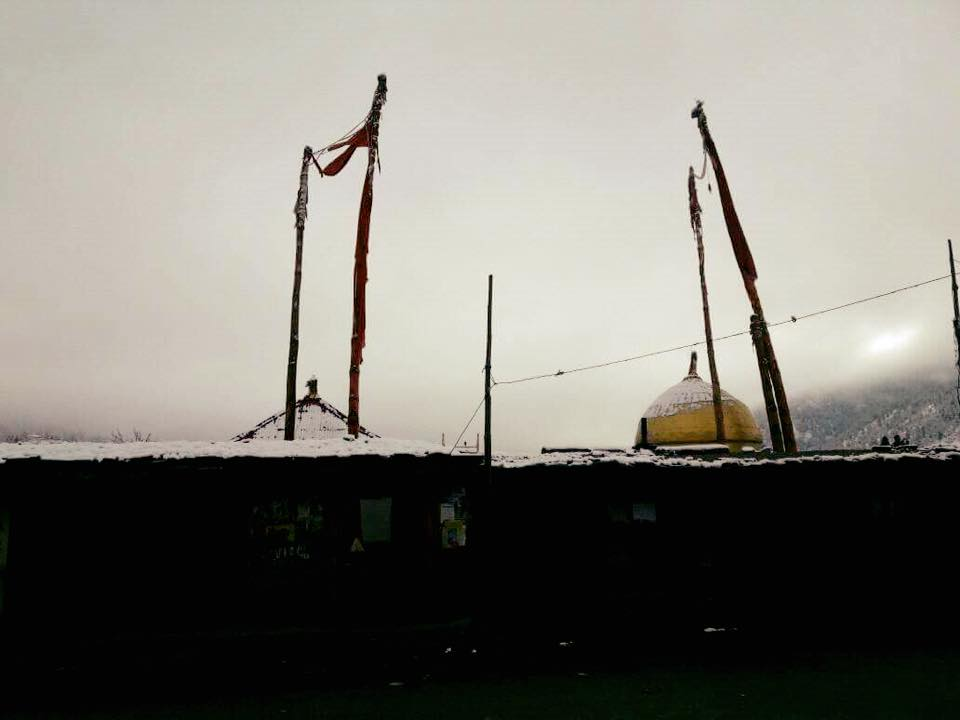
Chandannath and Bhairabnath Temple during snowfall

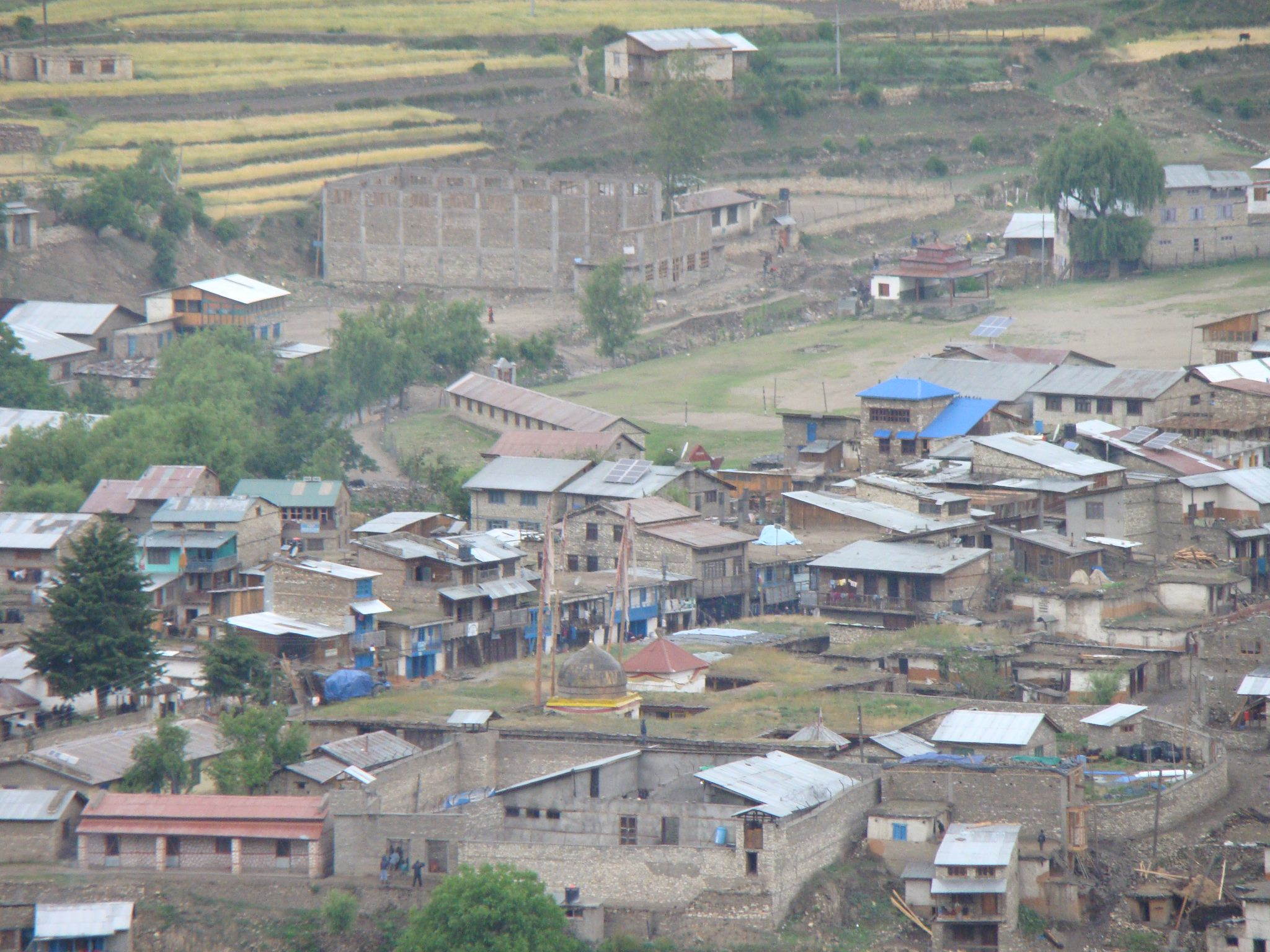
Chandannath and Bhairabnath Temple from far
