= Sanigaun =

Sanigaun सानीगाउँ
- Municipality
- Country: Nepal
- Zone: Karnali Zone
- District: Jumla District

Population (1991)
  - Total: 3,719
- Time zone: UTC+5:45 (Nepal Time)

Sanigaun is a village development committee in Jumla District in the Karnali Zone of north-western Nepal. At the time of the 1991 Nepal census it had a population of 3719 persons living in 682 individual households.
