= Tatopani (village) =

Tatopani, Karnali तातोपानी
- Municipality
- Location in Nepal
- Coordinates: 29.24°N 82.05°E
- Country: Nepal
- Zone: Karnali Zone
- District: Jumla District

Population (1991)
  - Total: 3,819
- Time zone: UTC+5:45 (Nepal Time)

Tatopani is a village development committee in Jumla District in the Karnali Zone of north-western Nepal. At the time of the 1991 Nepal census it had a population of 3819 persons living in 774 individual households.

== See also ==
- Tatopani, Jumla, rural municipality
