= Tila Rural Municipality =

Rural municipality in Jumla District, Karnali Province, Nepal

Coordinates: 28°19′N 82°30′E

Tila (Nepali: तिला गाउँपालिका) is a rural municipality located in Jumla District of Karnali Province of Nepal.
