= Patmara =

Patmara पातमारा
- Municipality
- Location in Nepal
- Coordinates: 29.37°N 82.22°E
- Country: Nepal
- Zone: Karnali Zone
- District: Jumla District

Population (1991)
  - Total: 2,460
- Time zone: UTC+5:45 (Nepal Time)

Patmara is a village development committee in Jumla District in the Karnali Zone of north-western Nepal. At the time of the 1991 Nepal census it had a population of 2460 persons living in 404 individual households.
