= Hima Rural Municipality =

Municipality in Jumla District, Nepal

Hima (Nepali: हिमा गाउँपालिका) is a rural municipality located in Jumla District of Karnali Province of Nepal.
