= Kartik Swami =

Kartik Swami कार्तिक स्वामी
- Location in Nepal
- Coordinates: 29.16°N 82.9°E
- Country: Nepal
- Zone: Karnali Zone
- District: Jumla District

Population (1991)
  - Total: 1,749
- Time zone: UTC+5:45 (Nepal Time)

Kartik Swami is the former name of the Village Development Committee of Jumla, a market center in Chandannath Municipality in Jumla District in the Karnali Zone of north-western Nepal. The former village development committee was merged with existing Mahat Gaun, Talium, Kartik Swami and Chandannath village development committees to form the new municipality of Chandannath. At the time of the 1991 Nepal census it had a population of 1749 persons living in 305 individual households.
