= Kankasundari Rural Municipality =

Kankasundari कनकासुन्दरी
- Municipality
- Location in Nepal
- Coordinates: 29.39°N 82.05°E
- Country: Nepal
- Zone: Karnali Zone
- District: Jumla District

Population (1991)
  - Total: 1,246
- Time zone: UTC+5:45 (Nepal Time)
- Website: kankasundarimun.gov.np

Kankasundari (Nepali: कनकासुन्दरी गाउँपालिका) is a rural municipality located in Jumla District of Karnali Province of Nepal.
