= Gothichaur =

Coordinates: 29°16′N 82°19′E

Gothichaur गोठीचौर
- Municipality
- Interactive map of Gothichaur
- Country: Nepal
- Zone: Karnali Zone
- District: Jumla District

Population (2018)
  - Total: 10,922
- Time zone: UTC+5:45 (Nepal Time)

Guthichaur (Nepali: गुठीचौर गाउँपालिका) is a rural municipality located in Jumla District of the Karnali Province of Nepal. It is 427 km², with population of 10,922.

It is centred on the former village development committee of the same name, which, at the time of the 1991 Nepal census, had a population of 2003 persons living in 316 individual households.
