= Narakot =

Narakot नरकोट
- Municipality
- Location in Nepal
- Coordinates: 29.34°N 82.02°E
- Country: Nepal
- Zone: Karnali Zone
- District: Jumla District

Population (1991)
  - Total: 2,752
- Time zone: UTC+5:45 (Nepal Time)

Narakot is a village development committee in Jumla District in the Karnali Zone of north-western Nepal. At the time of the 1991 Nepal census it had a population of 2752 persons living in 494 individual households.
