= Chhumchaur =

Municipality in Karnali Zone, Nepal

Chhumchaur छुमचौर
- Municipality
- Location in Nepal
- Coordinates: 29.35°N 82.38°E
- Country: Nepal
- Zone: Karnali Zone
- District: Jumla District

Population (1991)
  - Total: 1,409
- Time zone: UTC+5:45 (Nepal Time)

Chhumchaur is a village development committee in Jumla District in the Karnali Zone of north-western Nepal. At the time of the 1991 Nepal census it had a population of 1409 persons living in 226 individual households.
