= Kallala dynasty =

Medieval dynasty of the Indian subcontinent (1404–1789)

The Kallala Dynasty or Kalyal Dynasty (Nepali: कल्याल वंश) was the ruling dynasty of the Jumla Kingdom formed by King Bali Raj Raula after the disintegration of Khasa kingdom. The capital of this dynasty was Svarnagrama.

== Introduction ==
In pre-historic times, the Jumla Valley may have been a lake like the Kathmandu Valley. It may have been made habitable by God Chandannath of Kashmir, who is said to have introduced the paddy crop there first. In the medieval period, the region was ruled by the renowned Mallas. Sinja and Dullu were the summer and the winter capitals of this vast Malla kingdom until King Prithivi Malla, but during the reign of his son, King Abhaya Malla, both cities ceased to be the centers of the Malla administration. Udambarapuri became the residence of the king.

It is unknown what happened to the Mallas of the west after the reign of Abhaya Malla ,Many believe that Abhaya Malla was childless and distributed the kingdom among his vassals of the Doti, Accham, Dullu and Jumla. Others think that there was a coup from which numerous small principalities originated. There is not any factual proof, but it seems that the Mohammedan kings of Persia had wholly conquered India by the fourteenth century. As they had facilitated the Mohammedan immigrants of their natives and in the newly acquired principalities, the Brahmins ,Kshatriyas and the Rajppoot kings of Rajasthan and other parts of the country were frequently harassed by the Muslim section of the population.

In 1399 CE, Taimur Lang, the Timurid ruler of Persia, embarked on a military expedition into the Indian subcontinent, which was characterized by a series of raids and incursions. In the course of his invasion he had hundred, the might and eloquence of the Imperial Sultan of Delhi. At that time in the region of Rajasthan and Punjab about one hundred Hindus were slaughtered by the aggressor. These are some of the chief causes of the influx of a large number of the Kshatriya princes in the Western Himalayas during the opening decade of the fifteenth century A.D.

== The Origin of the Dynasty ==
According to the Virendra Bahadur chronicle, a historical document of considerable significance, the Kalyal dynasty was ruled by a total of 82 monarchs whose names have been recorded in the chronicle. According to this document, these kings of the Jumla valley were of the lunar dynasty, the illustrious Ravi-gotra (solar pedigree) and the Panchaparavara-Sakha. The venerable deity of the family was Rudra and the sages of the family were Savarni, Chavanam, Jamadagni, Margava (Bhargava) and Apalava. As per the historical account found in the Virendra Bahadur chronicle, the Kalyal dynasty was founded by Vailabhya Risi, who is believed to have been the first ruler of this dynasty. Succeeding him we have 4 more seers (Risi), then 8 Adityas beginning from king Vijayaditya, after this 37 Ranas including King Salivahana (this king is also referred as a Rana), and then 5 Pals. Posterior to these Pals we get the names of eleven kings having their names ending with the suffix of Raj and Baliraj is the fifth Raj king in this chronicle.

== Kings of Jumla ==
Kings of Jumla are:

- Baliraj 1404–1445
- Vaksaraj 1445-? (son)
- Vijayaraj (son)
- Visesaraj fl. 1498 (son)
- Vibhogaraj (?)
- Bhan Shahi c. 1529-90 (son)
- Saimal Shahi c. 1590-1599 (son)
- Vasantaraj 1599-1602 (son)
- Visekaraj 1599-1602 (brother)
- Vikramashahi 1602-c. 1635 (brother)
- Bahadurshahi . 1635-65 (son)
- Virabhadras Shahi 1665–75
- Prithvipati Shahi1676-1719 (son)
- Suratha Shahi 1719-40 (son)
