= Chandannath =

Chandannath चन्दननाथ नगरपालिका
- Municipality
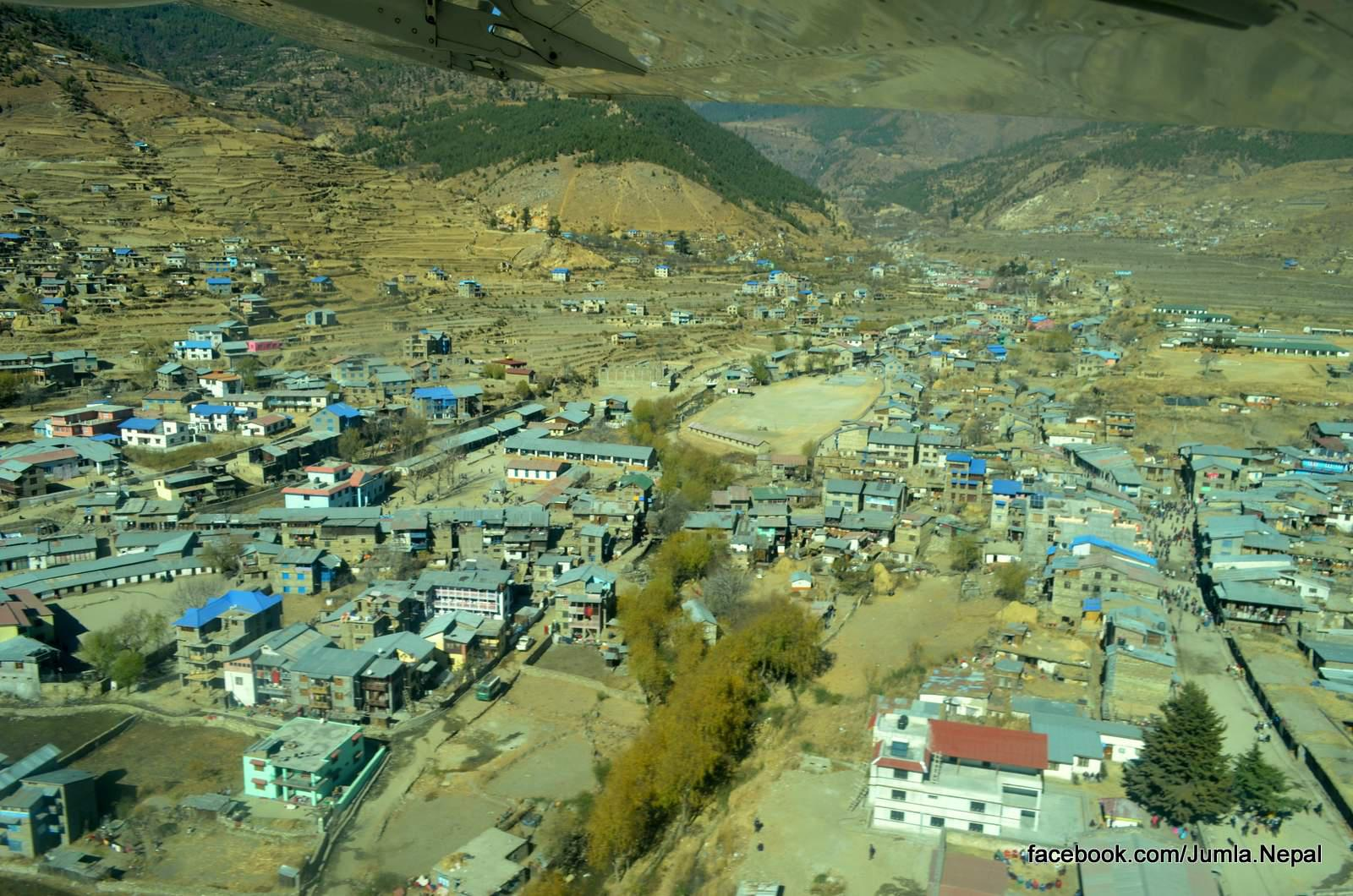
- Photo of Chandannath Municipality taken from a de Havilland Canada DHC-6 Twin Otter

- Location in Nepal
- Coordinates: 29.17°N 82.12°E
- Country: Nepal
- Province: Karnali
- District: Jumla

Government
  - Mayor: Kantika Sejuwal
  - Deputy Chief: Apsara Devi Neupane

Population (1991)
  - Total: 5,842
- Time zone: UTC+5:45 (NST)
- Postal code: 21200
- Website: chandannathmun.gov.np

Chandannath is a municipality in Jumla District in the Karnali Province of Nepal. The municipality was established on 18 May 2014 by merging the existing Mahat Gaun, Talium, Kartik Swami (Jumla), and Chandannath village development committees (VDCs). At the time of the 1991 Nepal census, it had a population of 5,842 persons living in 1,000 individual households.

== Politics and leadership ==
Kantika Sejuwal of the Nepali Congress is the first elected mayor of Chandannath; she is also the only female elected mayor in the municipality.
