= Tatopani Rural Municipality =

Rural municipality in Karnali Province, Nepal

Tatopani (Nepali: तातोपानी गाउँपालिका) is a rural municipality located in Jumla District of Karnali Province of Nepal.

== See also ==
- Tatopani (village)
