= Jumla District =

Jumla District जुम्ला जिल्ला
- District
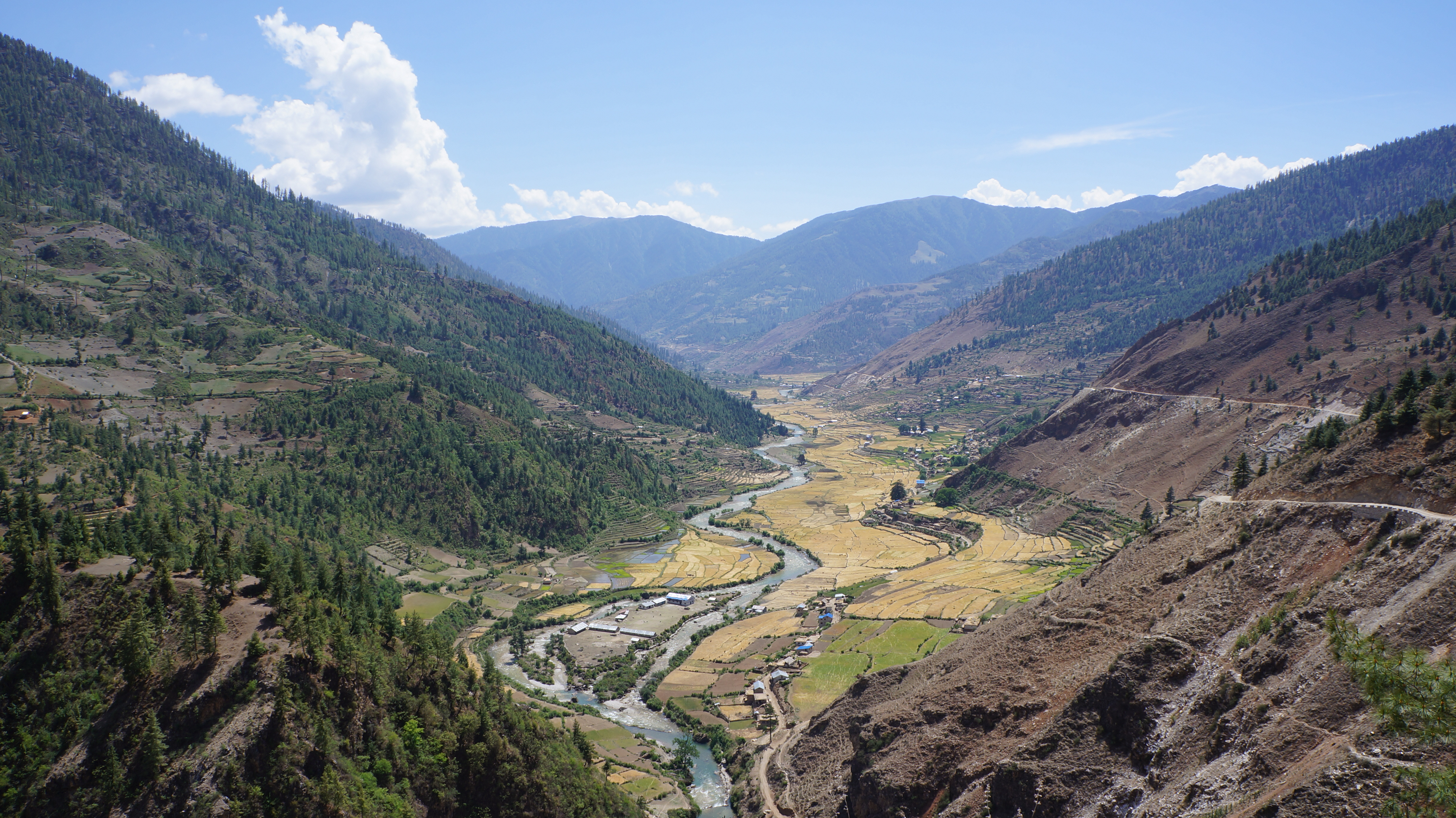
- Aerial view of Sinja Valley
- Nickname: Jumlanepal
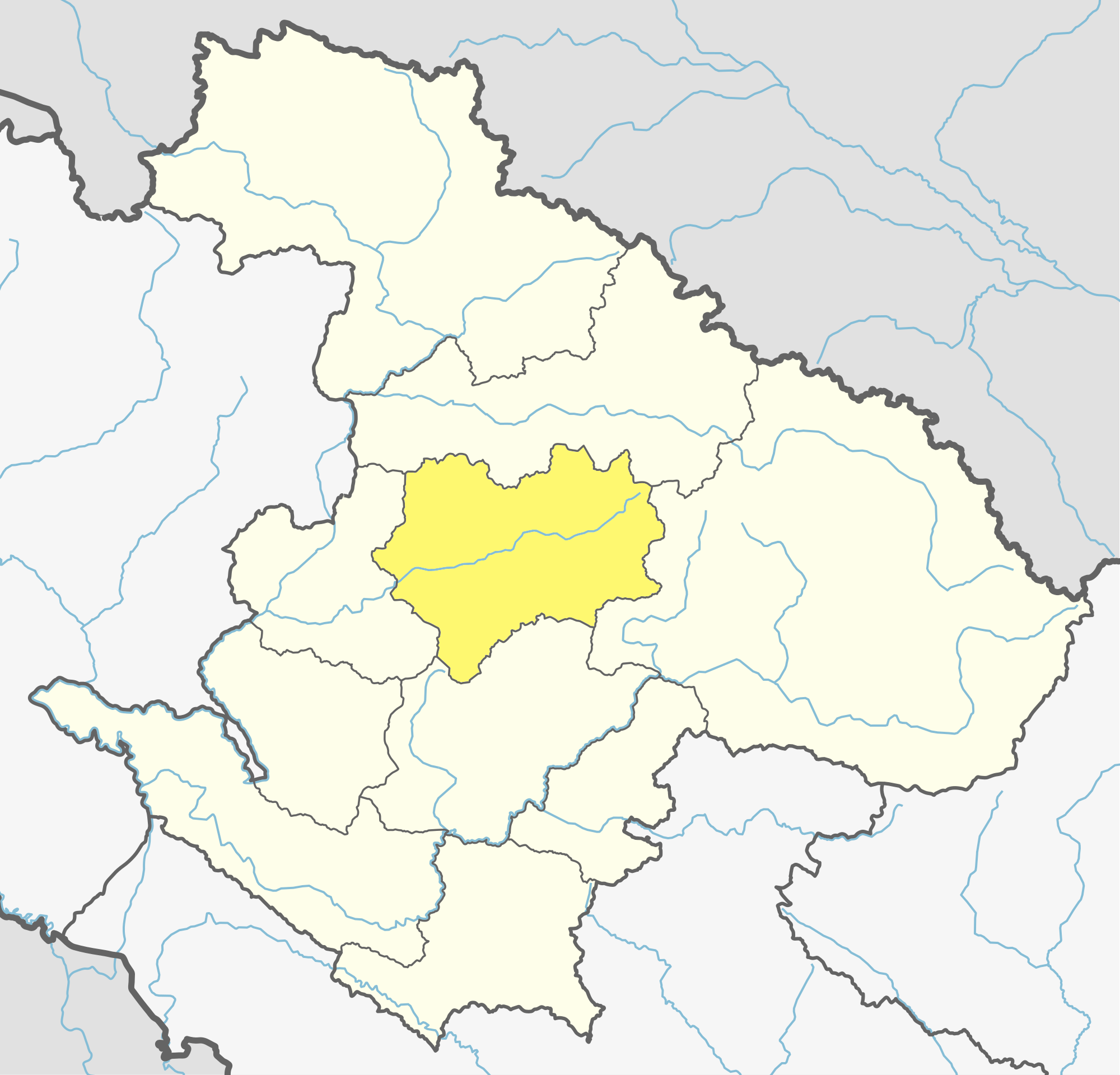
- Location of Jumla District (dark yellow) in Karnali Province of Nepal.
- Coordinates: 29.275278°N 82.183333°E
- Country: Nepal
- Province: Karnali Province
- Admin HQ.: Jumla
- Municipality: List: Urban; Chandannath; Rural; Kankasundari; Sinja; Hima; Tila; Guthichaur; Tatopani; Patarasi

Government
  - Type: Coordination committee
  - Body: DCC, Jumla
  - Parliamentary constituencies: 1 seats List: Jumla 1
  - Provincial constituencies: 2 seats List: Jumla 1(A); Jumla 1(B)

Area
  - Total: 2,531 km^{2} (977 sq mi)
- Highest elevation: 4,679 m (15,351 ft)
- Lowest elevation: 915 m (3,002 ft)

Population (2021)
  - Total: 118,349
  - Density: 46.76/km^{2} (121.1/sq mi)

Demographics
  - Ethnic groups: Chetri, Bahun, Thakuri
  - Female ♀: 50%

Human Development Index
  - Literacy: 70.2%
- Time zone: UTC+05:45 (NPT)
- Postal Codes: 21200, 21202, 21204, 21205..., 21209
- Telephone Code: 087
- Official language(s): Jumli Khas • Nepali
- Major highways: Karnali
- Website: daojumla.moha.gov.np ddcjumla.gov.np

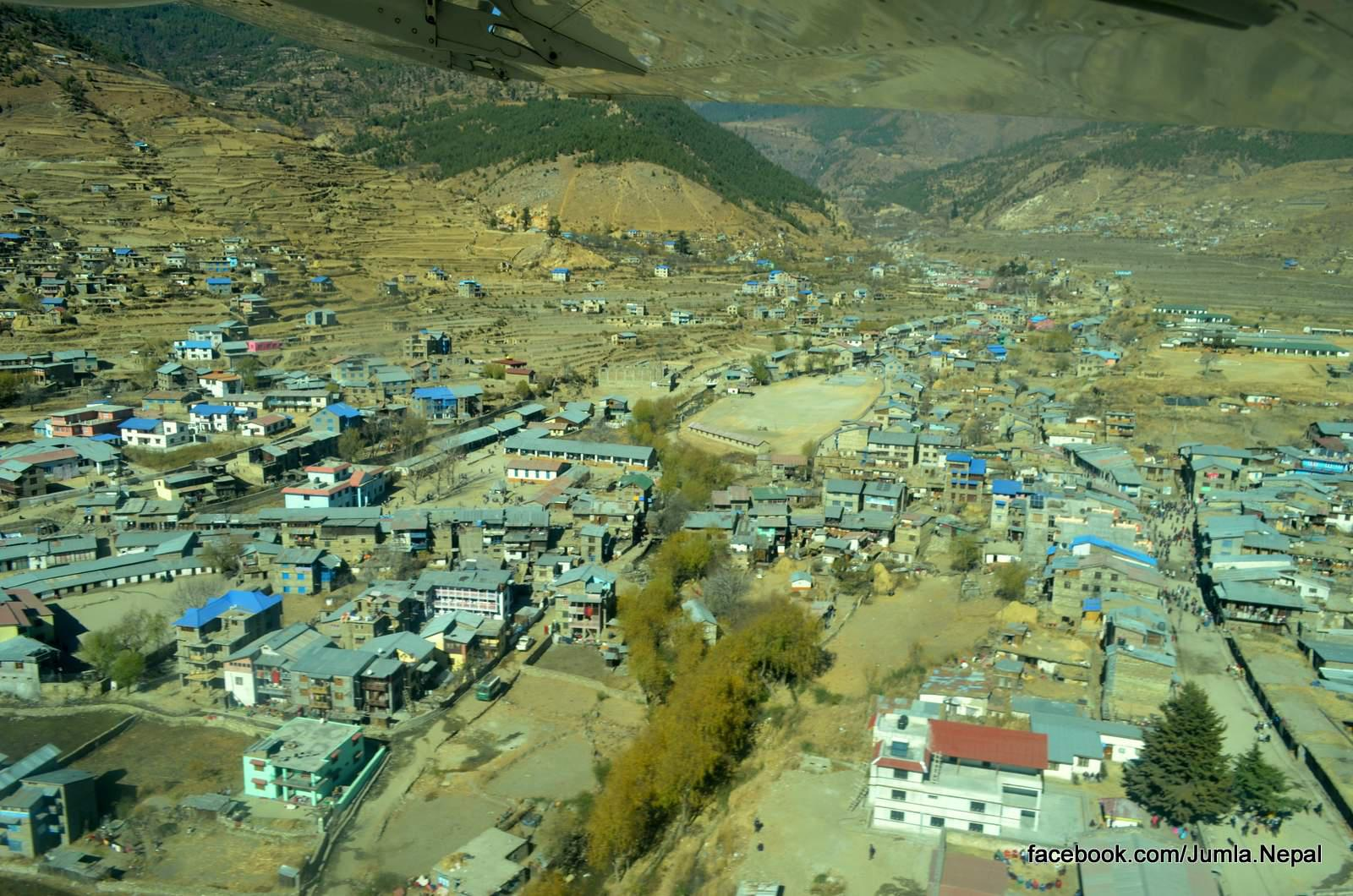
Jumla Bazaar from Twin Otter Aeroplane

Jumla District (Nepali: जुम्ला जिल्ला), is one of the ten districts of the Karnali province and one of the seventy-seven districts of Nepal. This district has Jumla in the municipality of Chandannath as its headquarters, an area of 2,531 square kilometres (977 mi^{2}). In 2021 the district had 118,349 inhabitants. Its territory lies between longitudes 81⁰ 28' and 82⁰ 18' East, and between latitudes 28⁰ 58' and 29⁰ 30' North.

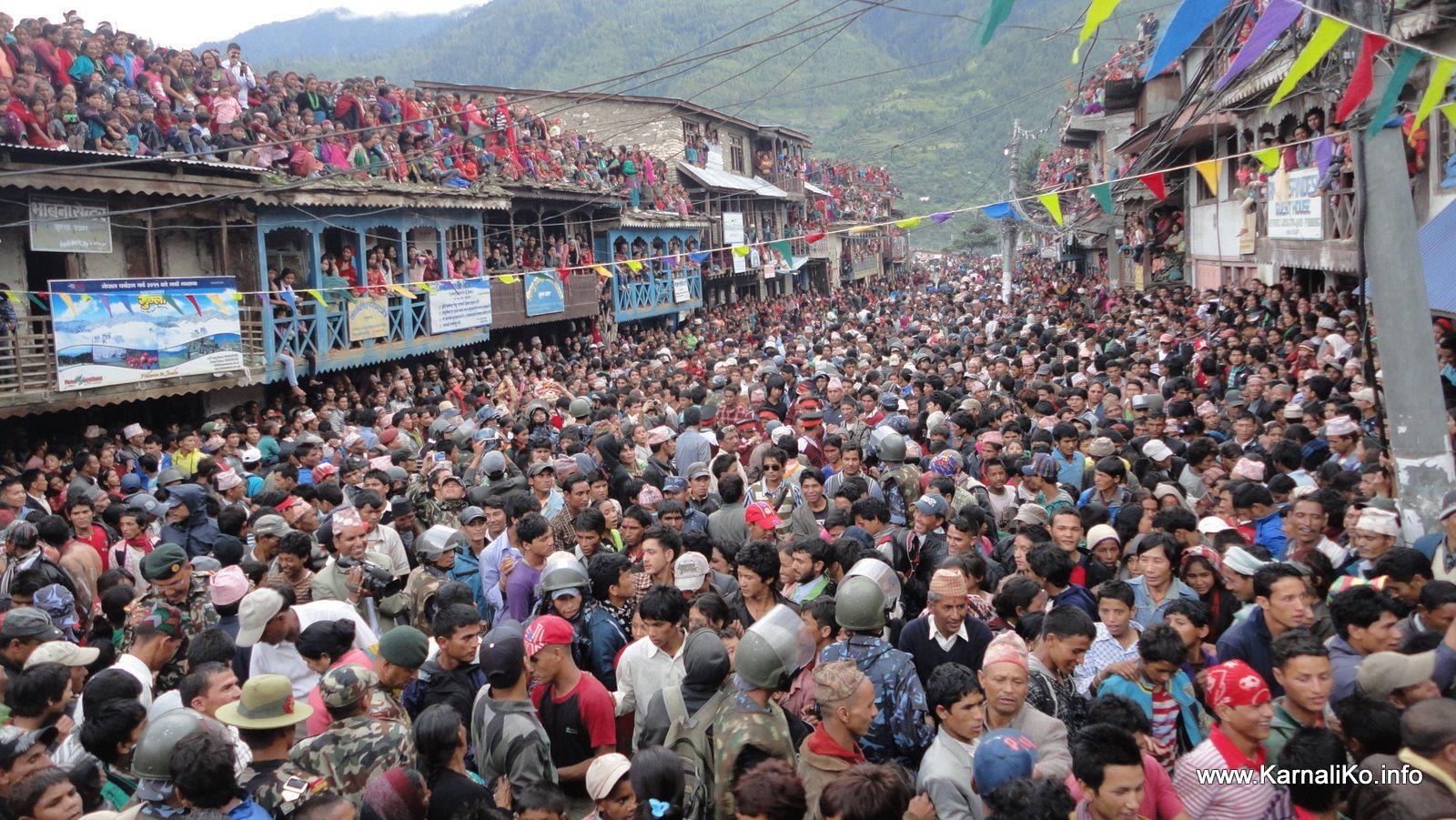
Crowd on last day of Jatra, Krishna Janmashtami in Jumla Bazaar

The Nepali language (then known as Khas language) originated in the Sinja Valley. Sinja was the capital of Khas Kingdom, and the dialect called "Khas Bhasa" is still spoken among that region's people.

== History ==
=== Khasa Kingdom ===
Jumla was a part of Khasa kingdom during the 11th to 13th century. After 13th-century, Khasa Kingdom collapsed and divided into Baise Rajya (22 principalities) in the Karnali-Bheri region and the Kingdom of Jumla was one of them.

=== Kingdom of Jumla ===
The Jumla Kingdom was one of the many kingdoms that dotted Nepal before its reunification by King Prithvi Narayan Shah of Gorkha and later by his younger son Bahadur Shah. The kingdom was founded around 1404 when Baliraja, who married the daughter of the last ruler of the Yatse (Malla) Kingdom, succeeded his father-in-law. It was one of the most powerful kingdoms in western Nepal, being one of the 22 Baise principalities of the Karnali region which had once been part of the larger Yatse Kingdom. After centuries of intermittent warfare, it appropriated the kingdom of Mustang in 1760. In the late 18th century the Jumla kingdom successfully defended itself against the first attack by King Prithivi Narayan Shah, and legend even has it that he got injured in the battle. Later, with the help of the kingdoms surrounding Jumla, during the regency of Bahadur Shah, Kaji Shiva Narayan Khatri led the Gorkhali troops and annexed Jumla for the Gorkha kings in 1789. The Jumla kings were Thakuris (Sijapati, Malla, Shahi) like the Gorkha Kings.

The Jumla Kingdom belonged to the more extensive pre-unification kingdoms in Nepal. At the height of its power it extended from Mustang in the east to present-day Uttarakhand, a state in modern-day India, territory that the Kingdom of Nepal lost to the East India Company in 1816 during the partition of Nepal. The Jumla kings belonged to the Kalyal dynasty. There have also been marriages between the Jumla royal family and the Shah's royal family of Nepal. The direct descendants of the erstwhile Jumla royal family include Nepali Film legend Nir Shah, Maya Kumar Shah SP (Retd.) of Nepal Police, former Director-General of Nepal Electricity Authority Harish Chandra Shah, DIGP (Retd) Sher Bahadur Shah, Colonel Nepal Army (Retd.) Bhim Bahadur Shah and AIGP (Retd.) of Nepal Police, Surendra Bahadur Shah.

==== Kings of Jumla ====
The kings of Jumla, post-1400:

- Baliraja 1404-1445
- Vaksaraja 1445-? (son)
- Vijayaraja (son)
- Visesaraja fl. 1498 (son)
- Vibhogaraja (?)
- Matiraja (?)
- Sahiraja (?)
- Bhanasahi c. 1529-90 (son)
- Saimalsahi c. 1590-1599 (son)
- Vasantaraja 1599-1602 (son)
- Visekaraja 1599-1602 (brother)
- Vikramasahi 1602-c. 1635 (brother)
- Bahadurasahi c. 1635-65 (son)
- Virabhadrasahi 1665-after 1704
- Prithvipatisahi after 1704-1719 (son)
- Surathasahi 1719-1740 (son)
- Sudarasanasahi 1740-c. 1758 (son)
- Suryabhanasahi c. 1758-1789 (son)

== Geography and climate ==
Geographically, Jumla is a Himalayan mountainous region of which elevations ranges from 915 metres (3,002 ft) to 4,679 metres (15,351 ft). The Higher Himalayan Region consists of Patarasi and Kanjirowa Himalayan ranges. The major rivers in Jumla are Hima, Tila and Jawa.

Climate Zone	Elevation Range	% of Area
Temperate	2,000 to 3,000 meters 6,400 to 9,800 ft.	25.3%
Subalpine	3,000 to 4,000 meters 9,800 to 13,100 ft.	49.7%
Alpine	4,000 to 5,000 meters 13,100 to 16,400 ft.	13.9%
Nival	above 5,000 meters	7.3%
Trans-Himalayan	3,000 to 6,400 meters 9,800 to 21,000 ft.	3.8%

== Demographics ==
Historical population
Census year	Pop.	±% p.a.
1981	68,797	—
1991	75,964	+1.00%
2001	89,427	+1.65%
2011	108,921	+1.99%
2021	118,349	+0.83%
Source: Citypopulation

At the time of the 2021 Nepal census, Jumla District had a population of 118,349. 9.04% of the population is under 5 years of age. It has a literacy rate of 70.20% and a sex ratio of 998 females per 1000 males. 21,036 (17.77%) lived in municipalities.

Castes/ethnic groups in Jumla district (2021)
1. Chhetri (60.2%)
2. Bahun (9.86%)
3. Thakuri (7.97%)
4. Sarki (7.65%)
5. Kami (7.51%)
6. Damai (2.65%)
7. Dasnami (0.93%)
8. Hill Janjati (2.40%)
9. Others (0.79%)

Khas people make up a majority of the population with 97% of the population. Chhetris form an outright majority in the district with 60% of the population, while Khas Dalits make up 18% of the population. Hill Janjatis make up 2% of the population, mainly Tamangs and other Hill Tibetan peoples.

Languages of Jumla district (2021)
1. Khash (51.2%)
2. Nepali (42.8%)
3. Jumli (4.14%)
4. Others (1.86%)

At the time of the 2021 census, 51.16% of the population spoke Khash, 42.84% Nepali and 4.14% Jumli as their first language. In 2011, 98.8% of the population spoke Nepali as their first language.

Religion in Jumla District (2021)
Religion	Percent
Hinduism	97.30%
Buddhism	1.45%
Christianity	1.16%
Other or not stated	0.09%

== Divisions ==
On 10 March 2017 Government of Nepal restricted old administrative structures and announced 744 new local level units (9 added later) as per the new constitution of Nepal 2015,

According to new structure Jumla district is divided into 1 municipality (urban) and 7 rural municipality:

=== Municipalities ===
- Chandannath (UM)
- Kankasundari (RM)
- Sinja (RM)
- Hima (RM)
- Tila (RM)
- Guthichaur (RM)
- Tatopani (RM)
- Patarasi (RM)

Note: UM=Urban Municipality, RM=Rural Municipality

== Ethno Medicine ==
Jumla along with Humla, Dolpa and Mustang districts have a history of people using traditional plants for medicine. Research has shown there are up to 109 different species of Ethnomedicine in these areas.

== Ethno Veterinary Medicine ==
Fifteen different species of plants are known to be used in ethno-veterinary practices in Jumla.

== Health ==
A 2019 study on blood types of people in Jumla revealed A positive is the most common blood type while B positive was the most requested from the blood bank at Karnali Academy of Health Sciences. It also states the most frequent demand for blood came from the gynecological department.

A study on Health facility preparedness of maternal and neonatal health services in 2021 found that Health facilities have better staffing levels, have access to essential medicines and provision of ambulance transport of women and children.

== Women of Jumla ==
As part of research on the leading causes of death among Nepali women of child-bearing age, a study on Mental Health and Suicide among women in Jumla has found that there are six issues when it comes to women's lives and views on suicide: mental health issues; economics; education; domestic issues; differential gender impacts; suicide and thoughts about it.

A study aimed at finding the frequency of teenage pregnancy and its outcomes revealed that it was 22% among total deliveries and that maternal complication accounted for 33% of the total pregnancies. Awareness about teenage pregnancy is low.

Women of Jumla were one of the first to be recruited into the Maoist Insurgency.

Child marriage is prevalent in Jumla as of 2019.

64.4% of women in Jumla are illiterate.

== Lagi-Lagitya ==
An "inter-caste economic dependency in a long-term hereditary contractual labor relations" is called Lagi-Lagitya. The castes of Bahun, Thakuri, Chettri who own land but don't till themselves employ low caste groups of Kami and Sarki to work on their lands.

== Natural Resources ==
Jumla is rich in Non Timber Forest Products (NTFP) namely medicinal plants and aromatics. 41% of the district is covered with Forest and rangeland.

== Animals and Crops ==
The Himalayan Black Bear damages crops and attacks livestocks but locals support the animal's conservation.

The red panda (Ailurus fulgens), a threatened carnivore species is found in Jumla.

== Rice Cultivation ==
Jumli Marshi is a high altitude rice variety that is thought to have been cultivated in Jumla since 1300 years ago.

== See also ==
Jumla: A Nurse's Story

== Gallery ==
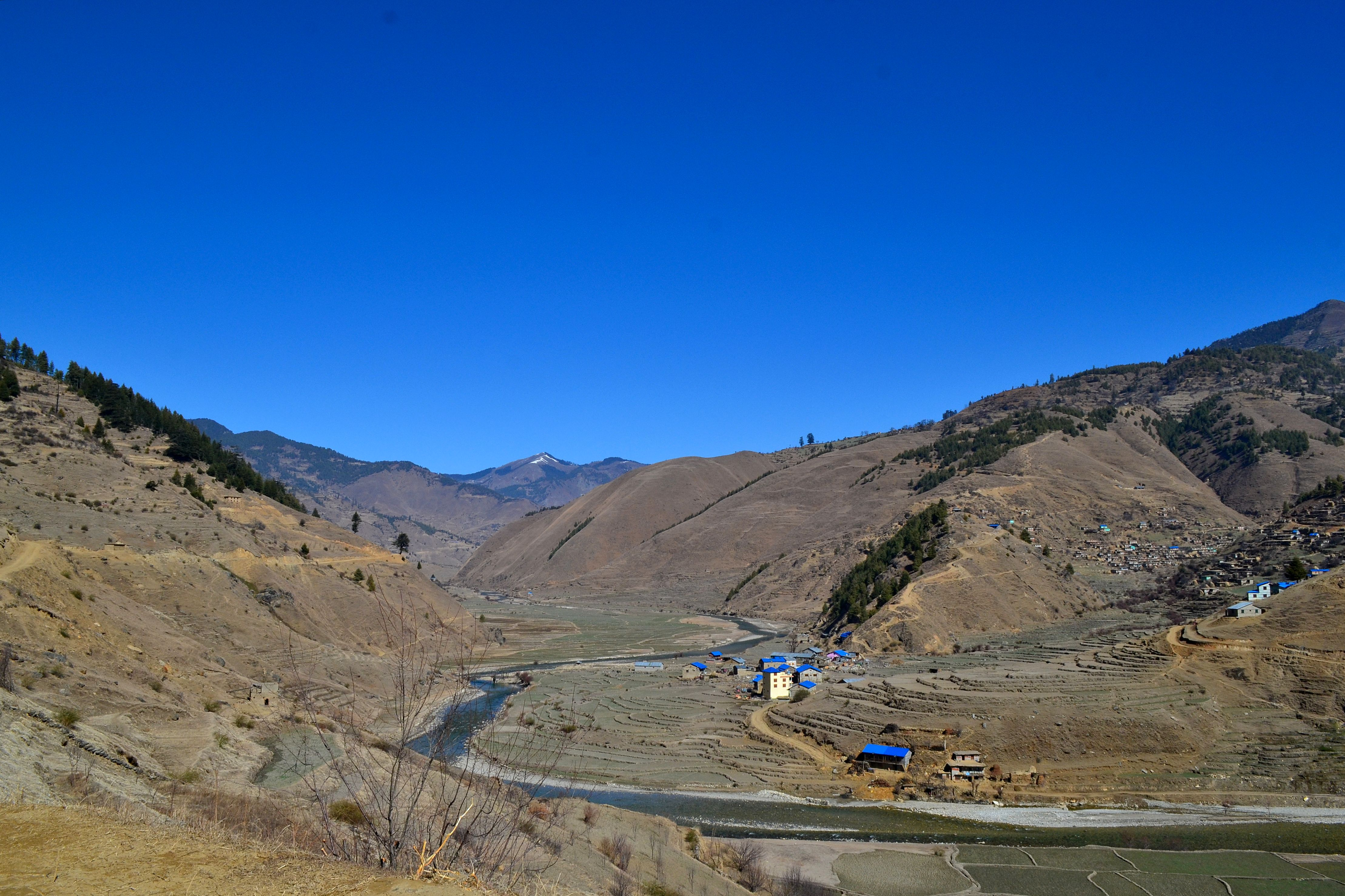
Narakot Sinja Valley

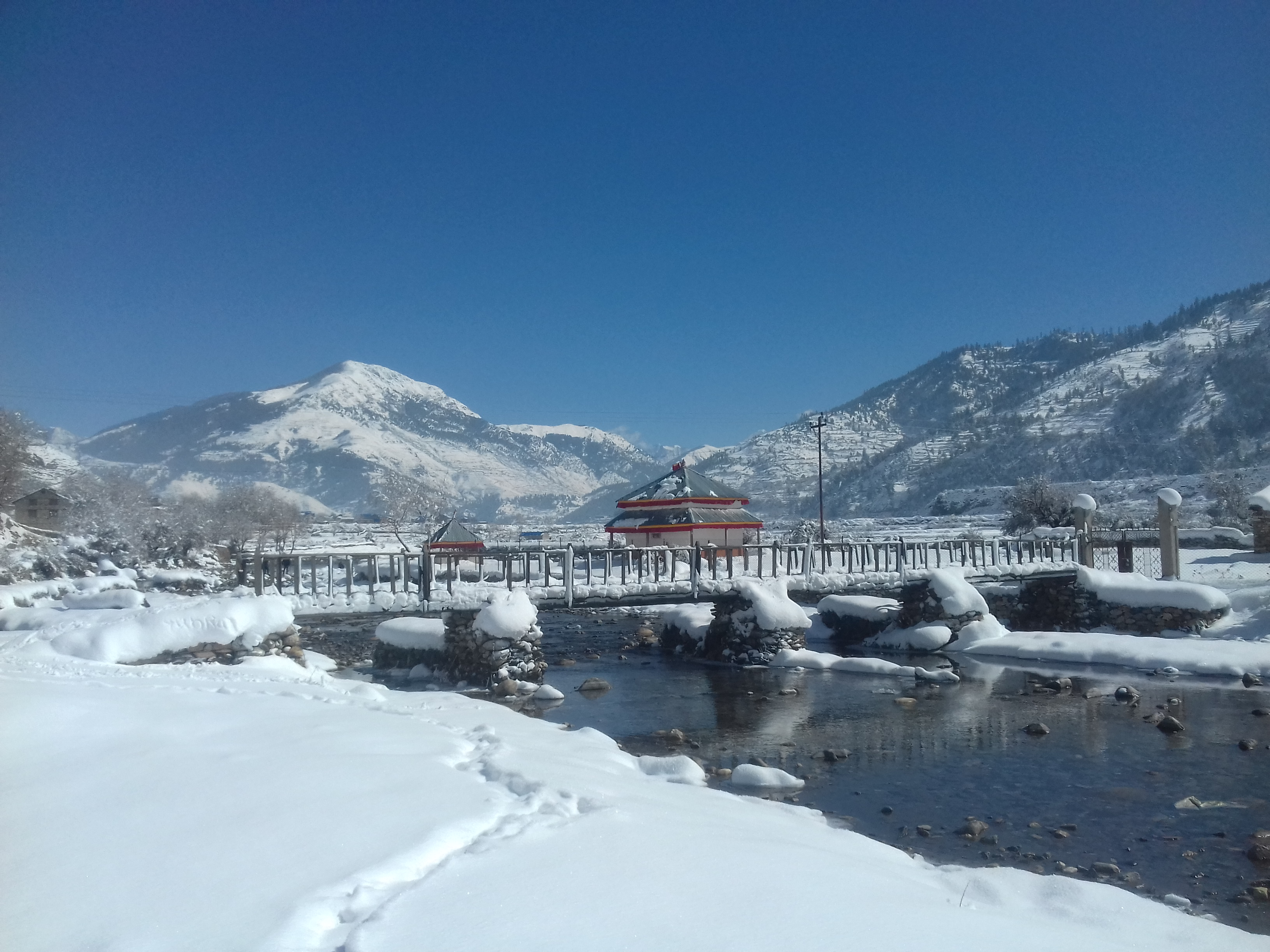
Beauty of Winter in Jumla

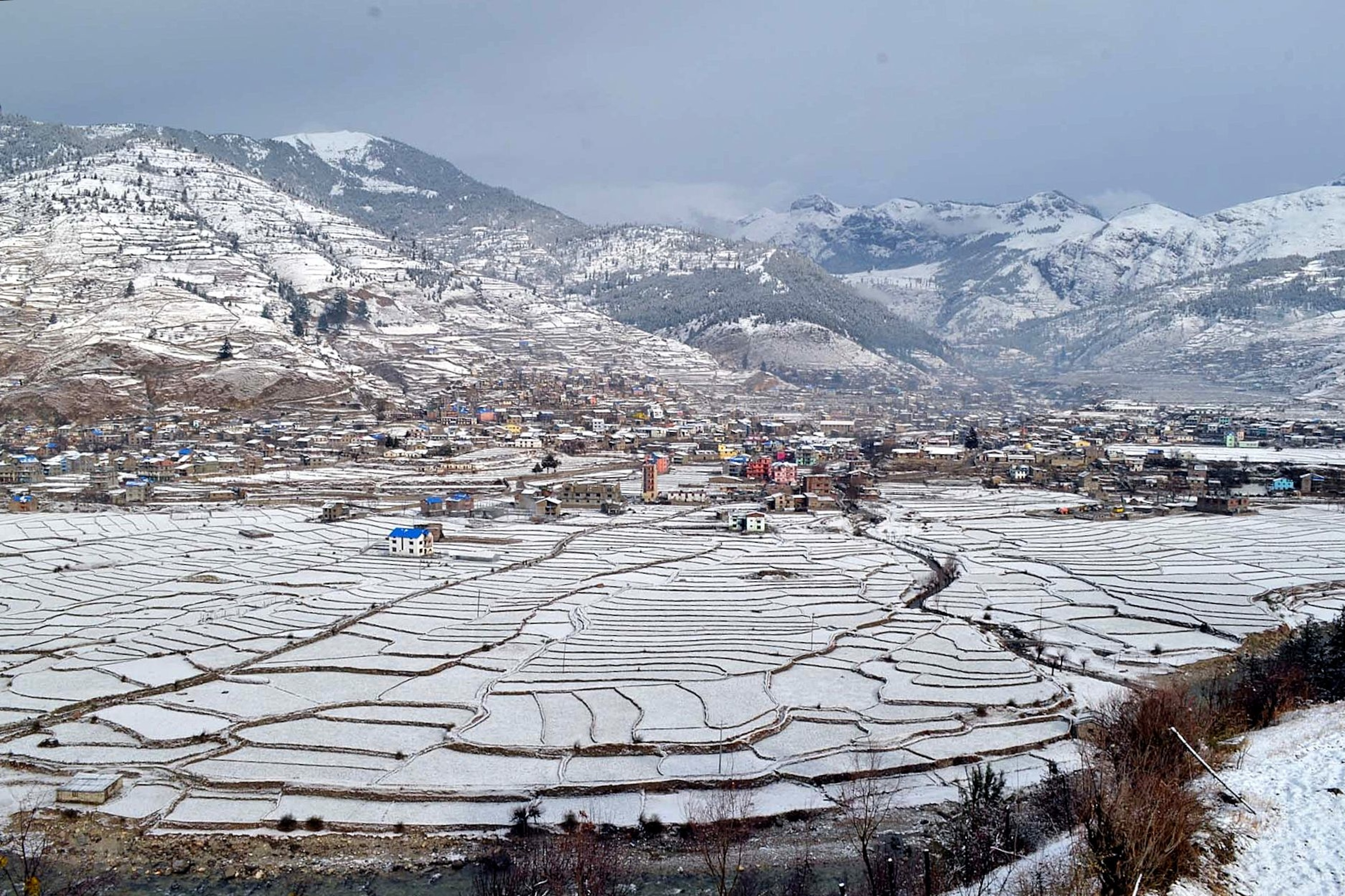
Tila Valley Jumla

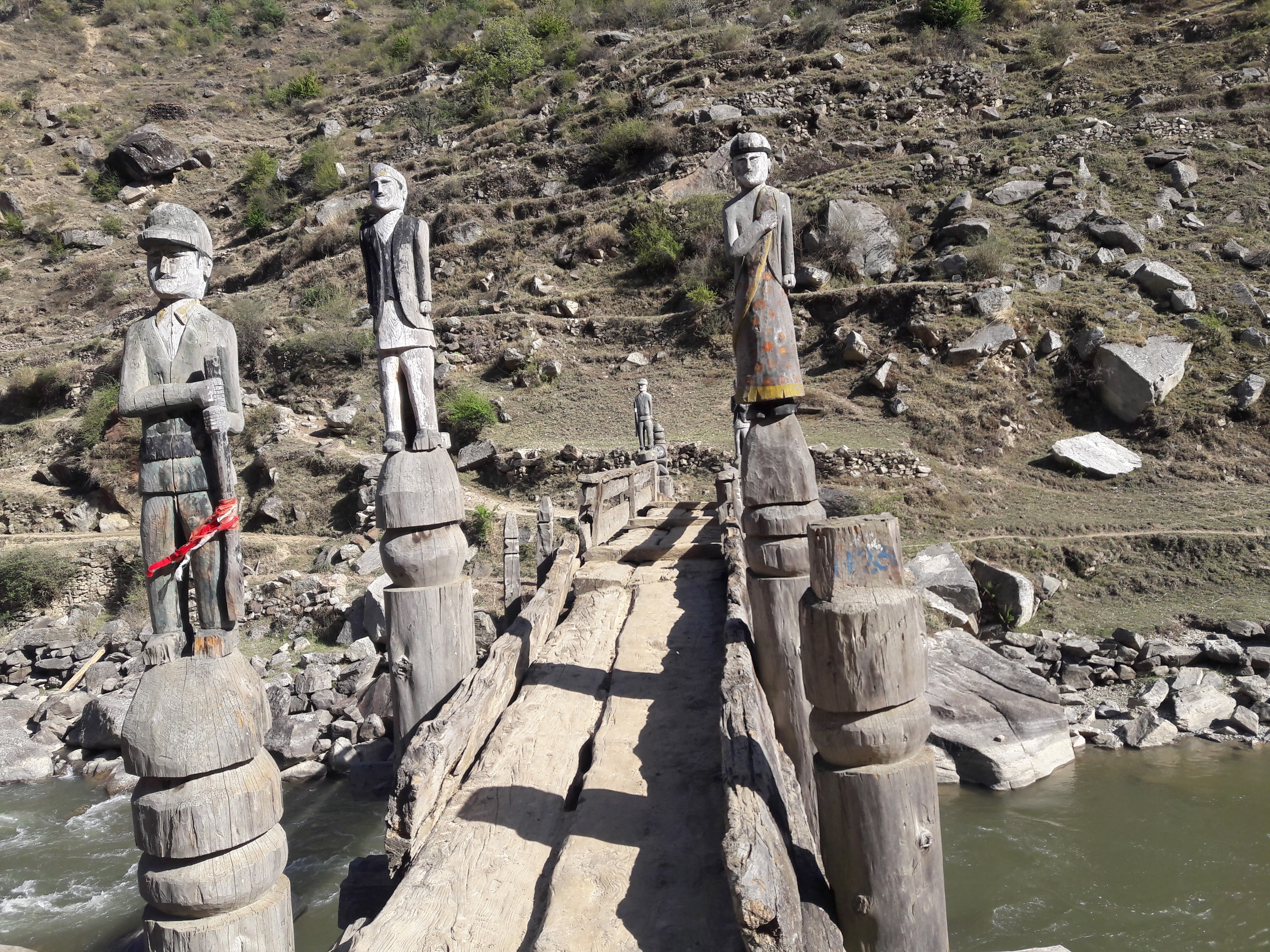
Wooden Craft, Jumla, Sinja

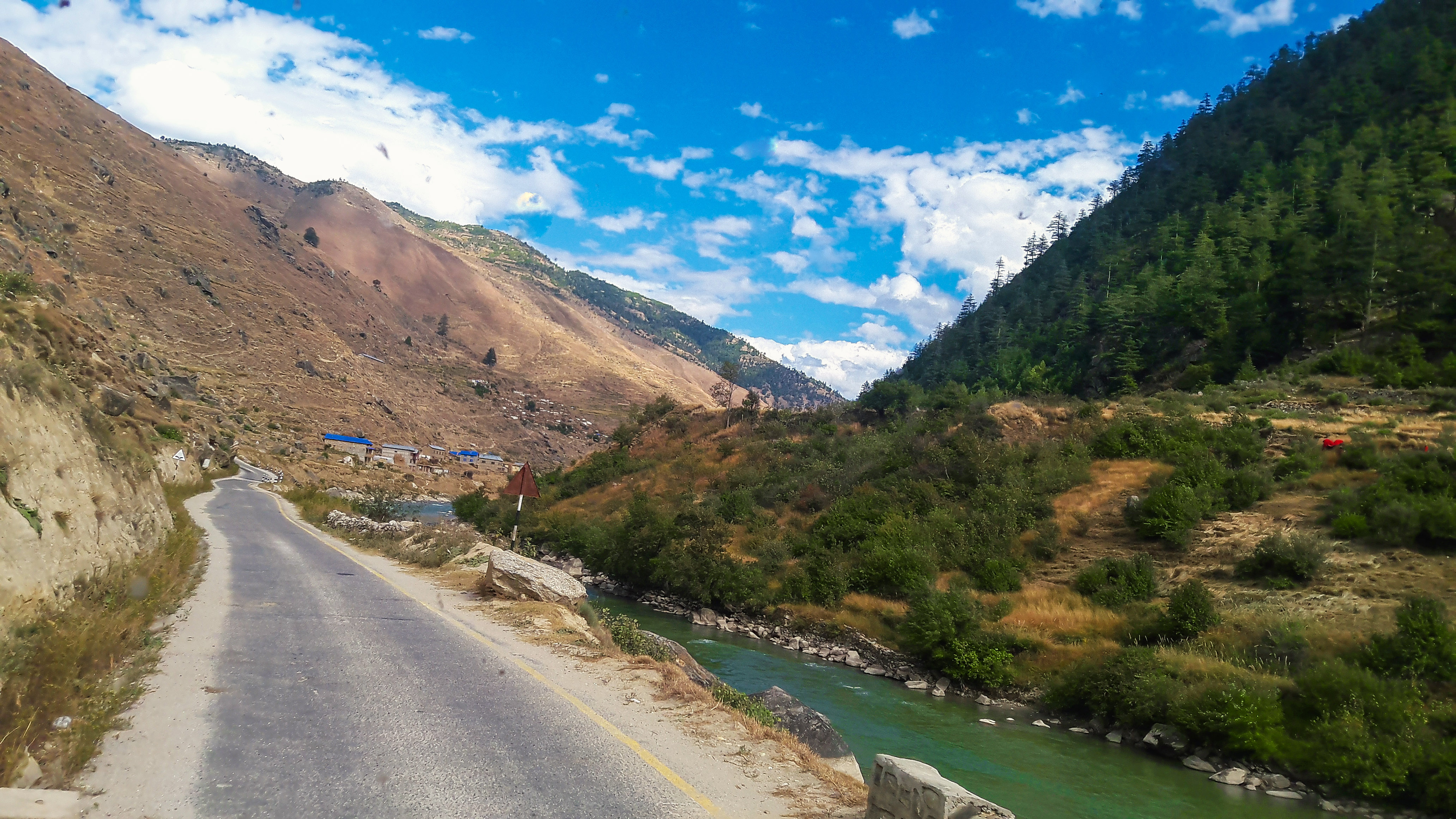
Way to Jumla

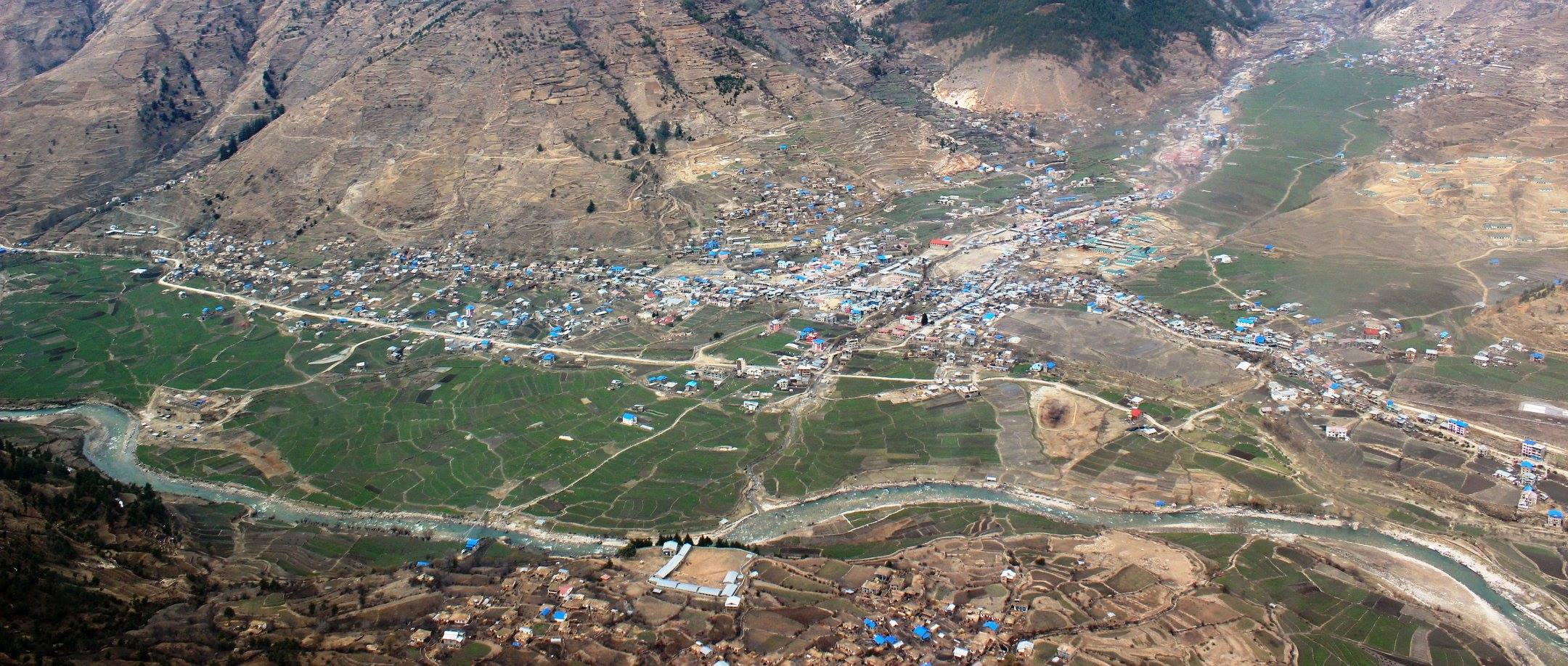
Jumla Panorama
