= 2023 Nepal earthquake =

Magnitude 5.7 earthquake in Nepal

2023 Nepal earthquake वि.स. २०८० जाजरकाेट भूकम्प
- Location within Nepal
- UTC time: 2023-11-03 18:02:54
- ISC event: 635879604
- USGS-ANSS: ComCat
- Local date: 3 November 2023
- Local time: 23:47 NPT (UTC+5:45)
- Magnitude: 5.7 M_{w} 6.4 M_{L}
- Depth: 32.6 km (20.3 mi)
- Epicenter: 28.848°N 82.187°E
- Areas affected: Nepal, India
- Total damage: Severe
- Max. intensity: MMI VIII (Severe)
- Aftershocks: 109 (3 above magnitude 4.0, and another measuring M_{w}5.3)
- Casualties: 153 dead, 375 injured (mainshock); 16 injured (6 November event)

A moment magnitude 5.7 earthquake struck Jajarkot, Karnali Province, Nepal, at 23:47 NPT (18:02 UTC) on 3 November 2023, killing 153 people and injuring at least 375. The earthquake was widely felt in western Nepal and northern India, and is the deadliest to strike the country since 2015.

== Tectonic setting ==
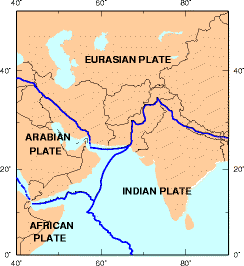
Plate tectonics of South Asia.

Nepal lies in the Himalayas, where earthquake activity is associated with ongoing continental collision between the Indian and Eurasian plates. These plates converge at a rate of 40–50 mm (1.6–2.0 in) per year. The Indian plate is thrusted beneath the continental crust of the Eurasian plate, forming thrust faults along the collision zone. The Main Frontal Thrust predominantly accommodates this motion. Earthquakes along these thrust faults have been devastating in historic times.

Based on a study published in 2013, of the Main Frontal Thrust, on average a magnitude 8 or larger earthquake occurs every 750 ± 140 and 870 ± 350 years in the east Nepal region. A study from 2015 found a 700-year delay between earthquakes in the region. The study also suggests that because of tectonic stress buildup, large earthquakes such as the 1934 and 2015 events in Nepal may be connected, following a historic earthquake pattern. A 2016 study on historical great (M ≥ 8) earthquake pairs and cycles found that associated great earthquakes are likely to occur in the West China region through the 2020s.

== Earthquake ==
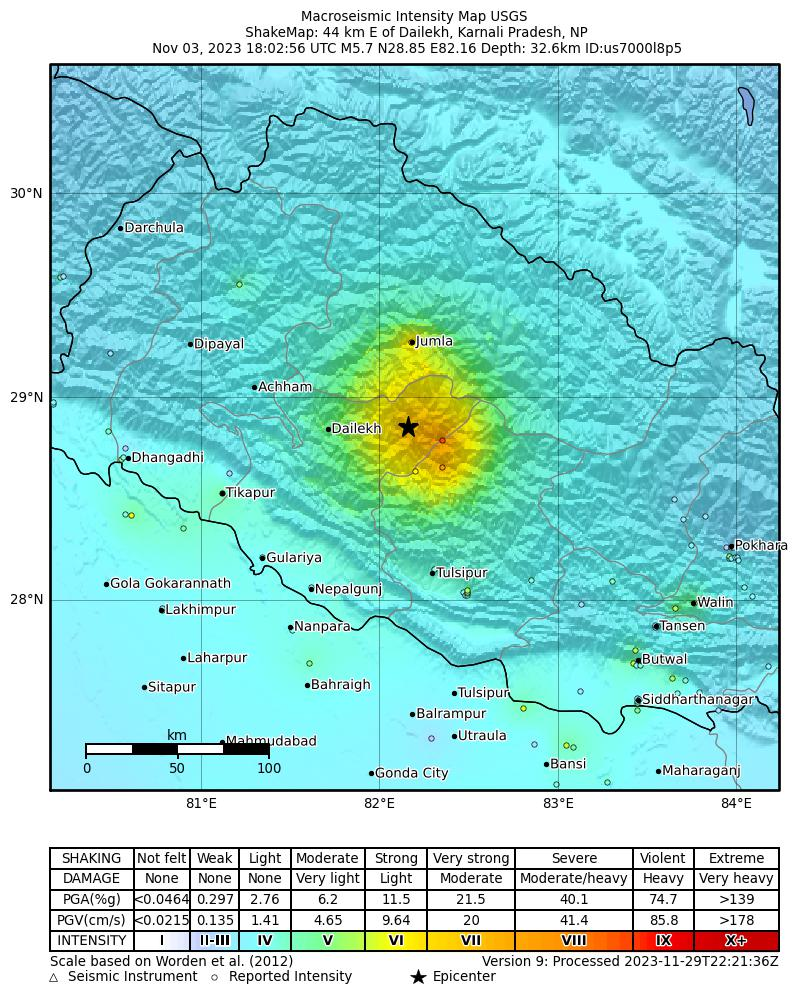
Strong ground motion map produced by the United States Geological Survey

The United States Geological Survey (USGS) said the earthquake had a magnitude of M_{ww} 5.7 and a depth of 32.6 kilometres (20.3 mi). Nepal's National Earthquake Monitoring and Research Center recorded the earthquake at 6.4 on the local magnitude scale (M_{L}). The epicenter was estimated to be in Ramidanda, in Jajarkot. The fault plane solution was determined to be reverse faulting along a northwest–southeast trending plane dipping either northeast or southwest. At least 483 aftershocks were recorded following the mainshock. At least six of them were of magnitudes above 4.0. A magnitude 5.3 aftershock occurred on 6 November.

== Impact ==
At least 153 people were killed; 101 deaths occurred in Jajarkot District while 52 deaths occurred in Western Rukum District. The deputy mayor of Nalgad Municipality in Jajarkot, Sarita Singh, was among the fatalities. At least 78 or nearly half of those killed were children. A total of 51 people died in the municipality while 200 houses were destroyed. Another 375 people were injured. Dr. Mandip Subedi, President of Nepal Geotechnical Society, Nepal, who visited the earthquake-affected area immediately after the earthquake, highlighted that despite the earthquake's relatively low magnitude, the high levels of damage and casualties were attributed to substandard construction in the region and because it occurred at night when people were asleep. Many of the collapsed houses were made of stacked logs and rocks.

About 62,039 houses were affected across thirteen districts of Nepal, of which 26,550 collapsed, mostly in Rukum West District. Forty-two people, including five members of a single family were killed and 100 others were injured in Aathbiskot. More than 5,000 houses were damaged or destroyed in the municipality. Eight others died in Sani Bheri. At least 40 percent of houses near the epicenter were damaged. At the earthquake's epicenter in Barekot municipality, only five injuries were reported and no fatalities, while nearly all 3,500 houses in the municipality were damaged, 1,000 of them severely. Several homes were damaged or destroyed in Jajarkot District. Among municipalities severely affected were Bheri, where 42 people died and 344 houses were destroyed, Kushe, where seven died and 95 houses were destroyed, and Chedagad, where one person died and 100 houses were destroyed. At least 13 people died in Chiuri, and the village's 40 houses were either destroyed or heavily damaged. In Chiuritol, 13 people were also killed while 56 houses were destroyed. Five houses in Junichande and one house in Shivalaya were also destroyed.

Nepalese officials said around 5,000 houses were damaged and 3,000 more were destroyed. In Western Rukum, 2,136 houses were destroyed, 2,642 houses were partially damaged and 4,670 houses sustained minor damage. The total damages in the district was estimated at more than US$500 Million. In Jajarkot, 905 houses were destroyed and 2,745 partially damaged. Three major landslides damaged the Pasagad-Rimna section of the Bheri Corridor running from Jajarkot to Dunai, while another landslide was reported at the Khalanga-Panchkatiya section. A bridge in Rimna in Jajarkot suffered minor damage. A total of 91 schools were destroyed and 122 partially damaged by the earthquake. In Jajarkot, 213 school buildings were damaged. The earthquake also destroyed at least 20 healthcare facilities, including a district hospital and four maternal delivery centres. Around 67,000 families were displaced in Jajarkot, while 2,400 were displaced in Darma. Several deaths were subsequently reported among the displaced due to exposure and cold-related illnesses in the succeeding weeks.

Injuries and damage were also reported in Dailekh, Salyan and Rolpa Districts. In Salyan, around 100 houses were destroyed in Darma municipality, while 30 were destroyed in Kumakh municipality. At least 100 people were injured in Western Rukum while many injuries were recorded in Jajarkot. The Jajarkot district hospital was described as being packed with injured patients.

The earthquake was also felt by residents in Kathmandu. Shaking was felt in the Indian cities of Lucknow, Patna and New Delhi, causing people to panic and flee buildings. In the cities of Bahraich and Jaipur, many houses and buildings, including two hotels, were cracked.

The 6 November aftershock injured 16 people and collapsed three houses in West Rukum and Jajarkot districts. Landslides blocked roads near Rimna.

== Response ==
=== Domestic ===
Narayan Prasad Bhattarai, the spokesperson for the Nepalese Home Ministry, said that security forces had been deployed to the area. Helicopters were also deployed to deliver humanitarian aid and staff, while soldiers were sent to clear roads blocked by landslides. At a hospital in Nepalgunj, more than 100 beds were allotted in standby for earthquake victims. A member of Western Rukum's police department said search and rescue teams had to remove landslide debris in order to reach the affected area.

President Ram Chandra Poudel expressed sadness over the loss of human lives and property in the earthquake and appealed to the government and others concerned for effective rescue and relief work in affected areas. He later postponed his ten-day visit to France, Italy and Germany that was scheduled to start on 8 November and cancelled his participation at the Paris Peace Forum on 10–11 November, citing the ongoing situation. Prime Minister Pushpa Kamal Dahal also expressed "his deep sorrow over the human and physical damage caused by the earthquake". On 4 November, he visited the area on a helicopter accompanied by a 16-member army medical team. A total of 41 medical workers were sent to the affected areas.

Officials also announced communications with villages of Jajarkot District could not be restored. Helicopters with medical teams and medicines were prepared to fly into the affected area when weather conditions improved. Light aircraft were also requested to be on standby in participating in emergency missions. The Nepalese Army later managed to deploy five helicopters and an aircraft. Nepal Airlines also helped in medical evacuations. The severely injured were airlifted to Kathmandu, Surkhet and Nepalgunj. People with minor injuries were treated at local medical centers and district hospitals.

About 4,000 personnel from the Nepalese Army, Police and Armed Police Force participated in search and rescue operations, while the national government approved a Rs 100 million fund to support in these missions. The fund was divided into Rs 50 million allocated to West Rukum and Jajarkot districts. It also said it would provide free medical treatment to earthquake victims and provide Rs 200,000 each to families of those killed, as well as Rs 50,000 each to displaced families to be used in the construction of temporary housing. The government of Bagmati Province also pledged Rs 15 million to support the affected population in Jajarkot. The Nepali Congress party also pitched Rs 5 million in financial aid for the national government. Buddha Air granted Rs 10,000,000 for earthquake victims.

Search and rescue operations ended 36 hours after the earthquake, on 5 November. In Jajarkot District, an official said the emphasis was providing assistance to survivors. Nepal Telecom said voice, SMS and Wi-Fi services would be free for its customers in Rukum East, Rukum West and Jajarkot Districts for five days to facilitate information exchange. The Ministry of Health and Population requested additional food aid from the World Food Programme and UNICEF to distribute in affected areas.

=== International ===
==== Countries ====
- Bangladesh: Prime Minister Sheikh Hasina sent a letter to her counterpart Prachanda stating that she was "deeply shocked and saddened" by the news of the earthquake. She reiterated that "the people of Bangladesh stand by the people of Nepal with the spirit of brotherhood during this difficult time" and said "we extend our deepest condolences to the bereaved families who have lost their dearest family members and their friends."
- China: Ambassador to Nepal Chen Song, said the country would send tents and blankets from the China South Asian Countries Emergency Supplies Reserve and other relief materials worth Rs 100 million to Nepal in the coming days.
- India: Prime Minister Narendra Modi said he was deeply saddened by the loss of lives and damage from the earthquake in Nepal, adding that India stood in "solidarity with the people of Nepal and is ready to extend all possible assistance". India sent 21 tonnes of humanitarian aid to Nepal along with a team of experts from the National Disaster Response Force with relief and rescue materials.
- Iran: The head of the Iranian Red Crescent Society Pir Hossein Kolivand stated that they would send medical and aid teams to Nepal.
- Pakistan: Caretaker Prime Minister Anwar ul Haq Kakar sent thoughts and prayers to the earthquake victims and said his country is ready to send assistance to Nepal.
- Russia: President Vladimir Putin sent a letter to President Poudel on 4 November expressing sorrow over the loss of lives and properties.
- South Korea: The country's government said it would send $300,000 amount of humanitarian aid for the earthquake victims.

==== Supranational political and economic union ====
- European Union: On 15 November, the bloc approved a €2 million aid package to Nepal that would include €600,000 to support the work of humanitarian partners already providing assistance in affected areas. In addition, €200,000 was allocated to the Nepalese Red Cross Society, via the Disaster Response Emergency Fund (DREF) of the International Federation of Red Cross and Red Crescent Societies (IFRC).

==== International organizations ====
- UNICEF announced it was working with partner organizations to assess the damage and the impact on children and families.

== See also ==
- List of earthquakes in 2023
- List of earthquakes in Nepal
- List of earthquakes in India
