= Chhedagad =

Municipality in Karnali Province, Nepal

Chhedagad छेडागाड
- Municipality नगरपालिका
- Location in Nepal
- Coordinates: 28.69°N 82.04°E
- Country: Nepal
- Province: Karnali
- District: Chhedagad 5Jajarkot = No. of Wards
- Established: 10 March 2017
- Boroughs: 13

Government
  - Type: Mayor–council government
  - Body: Chhedagad municipality Government
  - Mayor: Ratna Bahadur Khadka
  - Deputy mayor: Chandra Bahadur Thapa(APIL)(CPN (Maoist Centre)
  - Acting Chief Officer: Ganga Bahadur Rokaya

Area
  - Total: 284.20 km^{2} (109.73 sq mi)

Population (2011)
  - Total: 35,295
  - Density: 124.19/km^{2} (321.65/sq mi)
- Time zone: UTC+5:45 (NST)
- Website: www.chhedagadmun.gov.np

Chhedagad (Nepali: छेडागाड) is an urban municipality located in the Jajarkot District of Karnali Province of Nepal.

The total area of the municipality is 284.20 square kilometres (109.73 mi^{2}) and the total population of the municipality, as of the 2011 Nepal census is 35,295 individuals. The municipality is divided into 13 wards in total.

On the 10 March 2017, the Government of Nepal announced 744 local level units as per the new constitution of Nepal 2015, Chedagad municipality came into existence merging following former VDCs: Salma, Dasera, Suwanauli, Pajaru, Jhapra and Karkigaun. The headquarters of the municipality are located at Karkigaun

== Demographics ==
At the time of the 2011 Nepal census, Chhedagad Municipality had a population of 35,295. Of these, 100.0% spoke Nepali as their first language.

In terms of ethnicity/caste, 45.8% were Chhetri, 21.5% Kami, 6.9% Hill Brahmin, 6.4% Thakuri, 5.9% Magar, 4.3% Damai/Dholi, 3.8% Sanyasi/Dasnami, 3.4% Sarki, 1.3% Badi, 0.3% Lohar, 0.1% Gaine and 0.1% others.

In terms of religion, 99.6% were Hindu and 0.4% Christian.

In terms of literacy, 57.9% could read and write, 4.9% could only read and 37.2% could neither read nor write.
