= List of monuments in Karnali Zone =

Karnali Zone was one of the fourteen zones of Nepal, comprising five districts, namely, Dolpa, Humla, Jumla, Kalikot and Mugu. Here is district wise List of Monuments which is in the Karnali Zone.

== Karnali Zone ==
- List of monuments in Dolpa District
- List of monuments in Humla District
- List of monuments in Jumla District
- List of monuments in Kalikot District
- List of monuments in Mugu District
