= Kushe Rural Municipality =

Rural Municipality in Karnali Province, Nepal

Kushe कुशे गाउँपालिका
- Rural Municipality
- Location in Nepal
- Coordinates: 28.84°N 82.17°E
- Country: Nepal
- Province: Karnali Province
- District: Jajarkot
- Wards: 9
- Established: 10 March 2017

Government
  - Type: Rural Council
  - Chairperson: Mr. Harishchandra Basnet (NC)
  - Vice-chairperson: Mrs. Ramchhaya Shahi (NC)

Area
  - Total: 273.97 km^{2} (105.78 sq mi)

Population (2011)
  - Total: 20,621
  - Density: 75.267/km^{2} (194.94/sq mi)
- Time zone: UTC+5:45 (NST)
- Headquarter: Dhime
- Website: kushemun.gov.np

Kushe (Nepali: कुशे गाउँपालिका) is a rural municipality located in Jajarkot District of Karnali Province of Nepal.

According to Ministry of Federal Affairs and General Administration Kushe has an area of 273.97 square kilometres (105.78 mi^{2}) and the total population of the rural municipality is 20,621 as of 2011 Nepal census.

Paink, Dhime, Archhani, Talegaun and some parts of Pajaru which previously were all separate Village development committees merged to form this new local level body. Fulfilling the requirement of the new Constitution of Nepal 2015, Ministry of Federal Affairs and General Administration replaced all old VDCs and Municipalities into 753 new local level bodies.

The rural municipality is divided into total 9 wards and the headquarters of this newly formed rural municipality is situated at Dhime.

== Demographics ==
At the time of the 2011 Nepal census, Kushe Rural Municipality had a population of 20,621. Of these, 99.0% spoke Nepali, 0.9% Kham and 0.1% other languages as their first language.

In terms of ethnicity/caste, 31.6% were Thakuri, 26.3% Chhetri, 18.5% Kami, 8.8% Hill Brahmin, 7.0% Magar, 3.0% Sarki, 2.9% Damai/Dholi, 1.0% Badi, 0.6% Sanyasi/Dasnami, 0.1% other Terai, 0.1% Thakali, 0.1% Tharu and 0.2% others.

In terms of religion, 98.8% were Hindu, 0.8% Christian and 0.4% Buddhist.

In terms of literacy, 58.3% could read and write, 4.4% could only read and 37.2% could neither read nor write.
