= List of monuments in Bheri Zone =

Bheri Zone was one of the fourteen zones of Nepal, comprising five districts, namely, Banke, Bardiya, Dailekh, Jajarkot and Surkhet. Here is district wise List of Monuments which are in the Bheri Zone.

== Lists of monuments ==
- List of monuments in Banke District
- List of monuments in Bardiya District
- List of monuments in Dailekh District
- List of monuments in Jajarkot District
- List of monuments in Surkhet District
