= Barekot Rural Municipality =

Rural Municipality in Karnali Province, Nepal

Barekot बारेकोट गाउँपालिका
- Rural Municipality
- Location in Nepal
- Coordinates: 29.04°N 82.33°E
- Country: Nepal
- Province: Karnali Province
- District: Jajarkot
- Wards: 9
- Established: 10 March 2017

Government
  - Type: Rural Council
  - Chairperson: Mr. Mahendra Bahadur Shah (NC)
  - Vice-chairperson: Mrs. Oma Shahi (NCP)

Area
  - Total: 577.5 km^{2} (223.0 sq mi)

Population (2011)
  - Total: 18,083
  - Density: 31.31/km^{2} (81.10/sq mi)
- Time zone: UTC+5:45 (NST)
- Headquarter: Nayakwada
- Website: barekotmun.gov.np

Barekot (Nepali: बारेकोट गाउँपालिका) is a rural municipality located in Jajarkot District of Karnali Province of Nepal.

According to Ministry of Federal Affairs and General Administration Barekot has an area of 577.5 square kilometres (223.0 mi^{2}) and the total population of the rural municipality is 18,083 as of 2011 Nepal census.

Ramidanda, Rokayagaun, Nayakwada and Sakala which previously were all separate Village development committees merged to form this new local level body. Fulfilling the requirement of the new Constitution of Nepal 2015, Ministry of Federal Affairs and General Administration replaced all old VDCs and Municipalities into 753 new local level bodies.

The rural municipality is divided into total 9 wards and the headquarters of this newly formed rural municipality is situated at Nayakwada.

== Demographics ==
At the time of the 2011 Nepal census, Barekot Rural Municipality had a population of 18,083. Of these, 99.9% spoke Nepali and 0.1% other languages as their first language.

In terms of ethnicity/caste, 41.7% were Chhetri, 21.6% Kami, 21.4% Thakuri, 6.4% Magar, 2.9% Sarki, 2.3% Damai/Dholi, 1.9% Sanyasi/Dasnami, 1.2% Hill Brahmin, 0.3% Badi, 0.1% Gharti/Bhujel, 0.1% Newar and 0.1% others.

In terms of religion, 98.6% were Hindu and 1.3% Christian.

In terms of literacy, 48.6% could read and write, 3.1% could only read and 48.3% could neither read nor write.
