= Junichande Rural Municipality =

Rural Municipality in Karnali Province, Nepal

Junichande जुनीचाँदे गाउँपालिका
- Rural Municipality
- Location in Nepal
- Coordinates: 28.88°N 82.03°E
- Country: Nepal
- Province: Karnali Province
- District: Jajarkot
- Wards: 11
- Established: 10 March 2017

Government
  - Type: Rural Council
  - Chairperson: Mr. Bed Bahadur Shahi (CPN(UML))
  - Vice-chairperson: Mr. Birendra Bahadur Shahi (NC)

Area
  - Total: 346.21 km^{2} (133.67 sq mi)

Population (2011)
  - Total: 21,733
  - Density: 62.774/km^{2} (162.58/sq mi)
- Time zone: UTC+5:45 (NST)
- Headquarter: Majhkot
- Website: Official website

Junichande (Nepali: जुनीचाँदे गाउँपालिका) is a rural municipality located in Jajarkot District of Karnali Province of Nepal.

According to Ministry of Federal Affairs and General Administration, Junichande has an area of 346.21 square kilometres (133.67 mi^{2}) and the total population of the rural municipality is 21,733 as of 2011 Nepal census.

Majhkot, Garkhakot, Daha and Kortrang which previously were all separate Village development committees merged to form this new local level body. Fulfilling the requirement of the new Constitution of Nepal 2015, Ministry of Federal Affairs and General Administration replaced all old VDCs and Municipalities into 753 new local level bodies.

The rural municipality is divided into total eleven wards and the headquarters of this newly formed rural municipality is situated at Majhkot.

== Demographics ==
At the time of the 2011 Nepal census, Junichande Rural Municipality had a population of 21,733. Of those, 95.6% spoke Nepali, 3.2% Kham, 1.1% Magar and 0.1% Maithili and 0.1% other languages as their first language.

In terms of ethnicity/caste, 38.7% were Chhetri, 22.9% Kami, 21.4% Thakuri, 5.6% Damai/Dholi, 4.9% Magar, 2.9% Sanyasi/Dasnami, 1.3% Hill Brahmin, 1.1% Sarki, 0.5% Badi, 0.3% Kathabaniyan, 0.1% other Dalit, 0.1% other Terai, 0.1% Tharu and 0.1% others.

In terms of religion, 98.0% were Hindu and 2.0% Christian.

In terms of literacy, 53.0% could read and write, 5.6% could only read and 41.2% could neither read nor write.
