= Nalgad =

Municipality in Karnali Province, Nepal

Nalgad नलगाड
- Municipality
- Location in Nepal
- Coordinates: 28.83°N 82.35°E
- Country: Nepal
- Province: Karnali
- District: Jajarkot
- No. of wards: 13
- Established: 10 March 2017

Government
  - Type: Mayor-council
  - Mayor: Mr. Nabin Rawat (NCP)
  - Deputy mayor: Mrs. Sarita Singh Thakuri (Democratic)

Area
  - Total: 387.44 km^{2} (149.59 sq mi)

Population (2011)
  - Total: 25,597
  - Density: 66.067/km^{2} (171.11/sq mi)
- Time zone: UTC+5:45 (NST)
- Website: official website

Nalgad (Nepali: नलगाड) (earlier:Tribeni Nalgad) is an urban municipality located in Jajarkot District of Karnali Province of Nepal.

The total area of the municipality is 387.44 square kilometres (149.59 sq mi) and the total population of the municipality as of 2011 Nepal census is 25,597 individuals. The municipality is divided into total 13 wards.

The municipality was established on 10 March 2017, when Government of Nepal restricted all old administrative structure and announced 744 local level units as per the new constitution of Nepal 2015.

Dandagaun, Lahailll, Khagenkot, Ragda and Bhagawati Tol Village development committees were Incorporated to form this new municipality. The headquarters of the municipality is situated at Khagenkot.

== Localities ==
Some populated localities within the municipality are:

- Badalek
- Nahukuli
- Jhureli
- Faanchaur

== Demographics ==
At the time of the 2011 Nepal census, Nalgad Municipality had a population of 25,590. Of these, 99.3% spoke Nepali, 0.5% Magar, 0.2% Kham and 0.1% other languages as their first language.

In terms of ethnicity/caste, 32.1% were Chhetri, 24.1% Kami, 17.2% Magar, 15.0% Thakuri, 5.5% Damai/Dholi, 2.9% Hill Brahmin, 1.5% Sanyasi/Dasnami, 0.9% Sarki, 0.4% Badi, 0.1% Rai, 0.1% Gurung, 0.1% other Dalit and 0.2% others.

In terms of religion, 98.3% were Hindu, 1.0% Christian and 0.7% others.

In terms of literacy, 57.5% could read and write, 3.9% could only read and 38.6% could neither read nor write.
