= Kalegaun, Jajarkot =

Village in Karnali, Nepal

Kalegaun कालेगाउँ
- Village
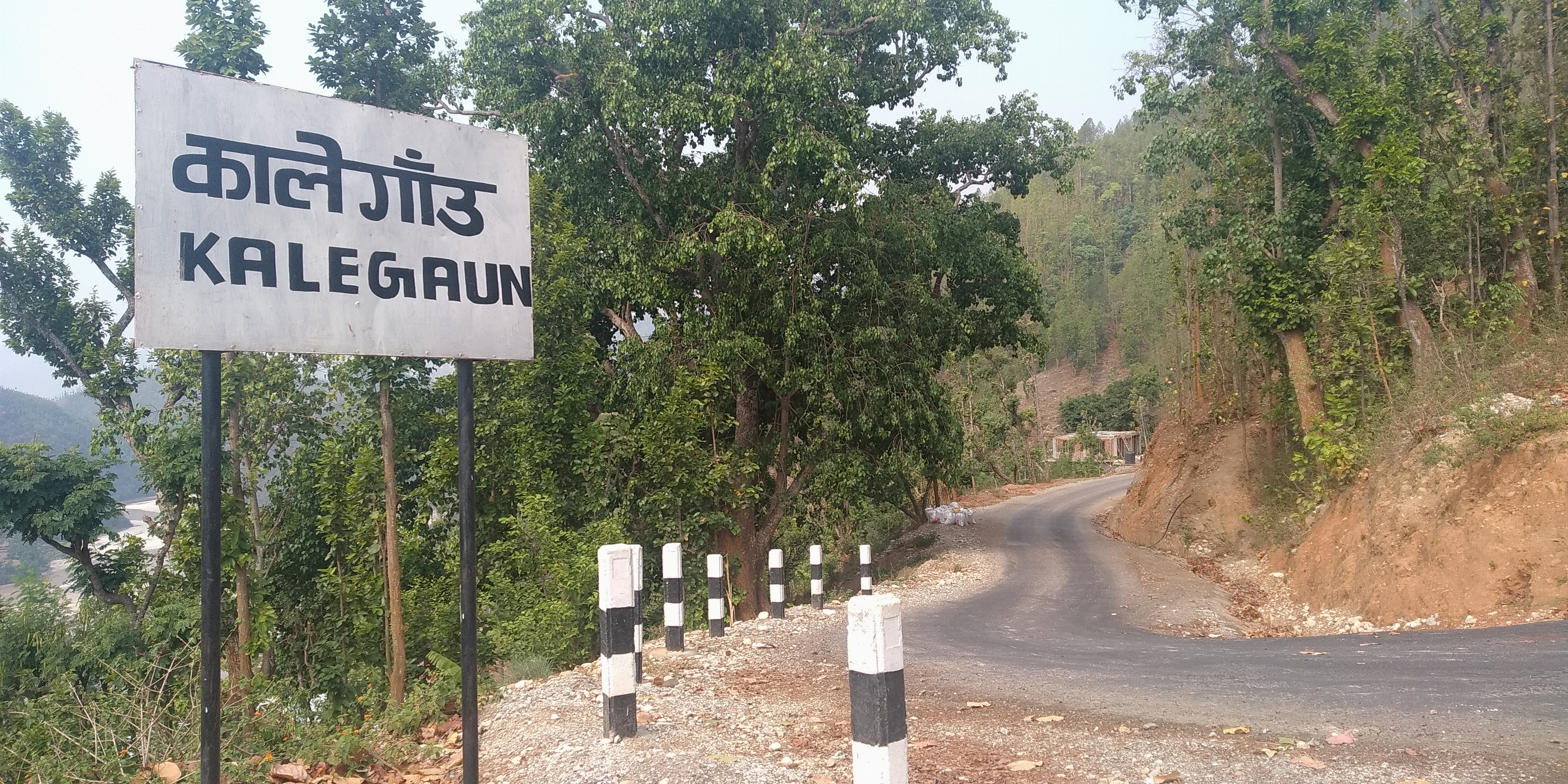

- Location in Nepal
- Coordinates: 28.69°N 82.22°E
- Country: Nepal
- Province: Karnali
- District: Jajarkot
- Municipality: Bheri
- Time zone: UTC+05:45 (NST)

Kalegaun (Nepali: कालेगाउँ) is a village located in Bheri municipality in Jajarkot District of Karnali Province of Nepal. The aerial distance from Kalegaun to Nepal's capital Kathmandu is approximately 324 km.

== Education ==
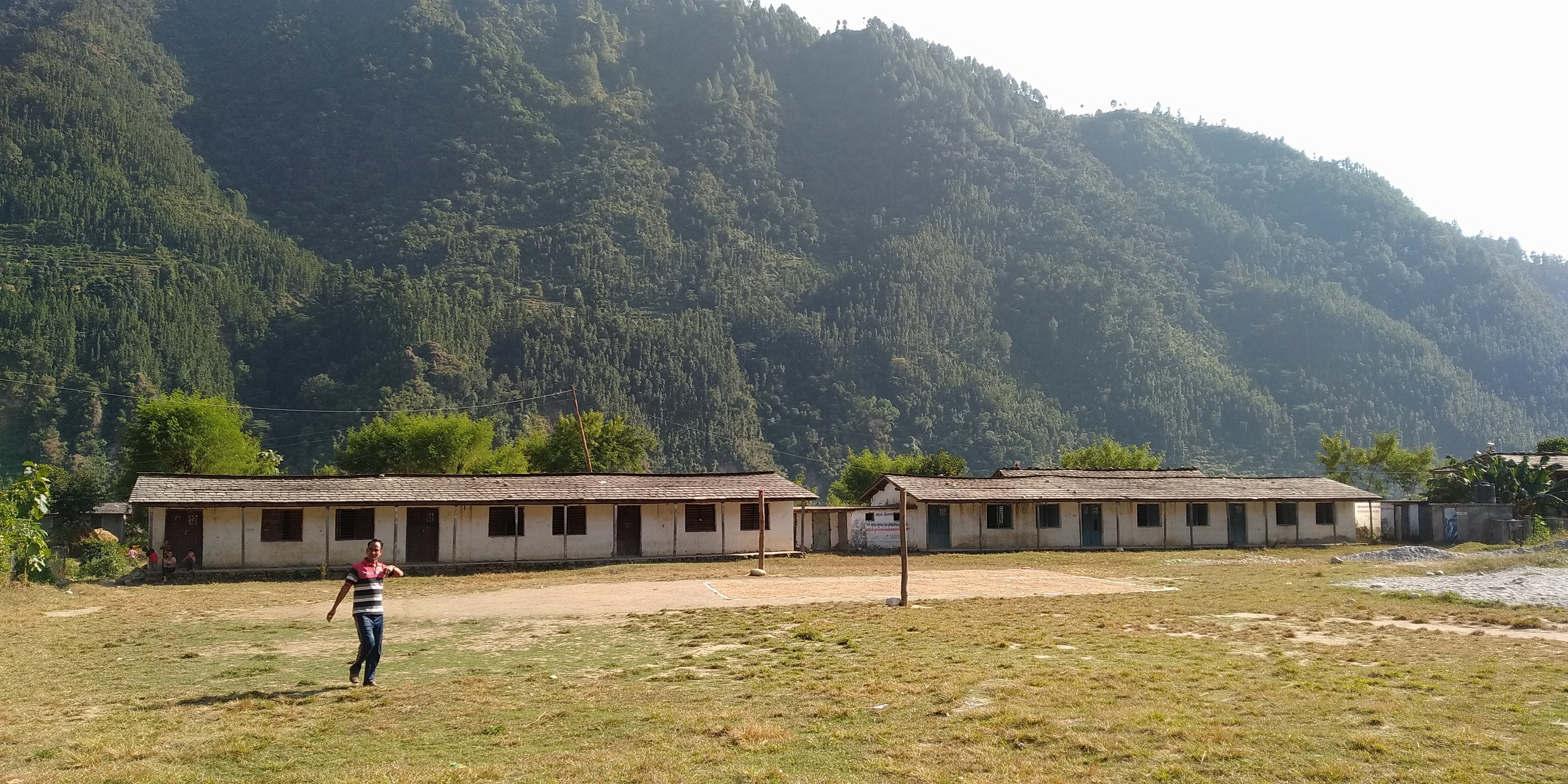
A part of Shiva Byawasaik Secondary School

Shiva Byawasaik Secondary School is the first vocational school in Jajarkot District.

== Notable people ==
Notable people born in Kalegaun include:

- Shakti Bahadur Basnet, politician

== Temples ==
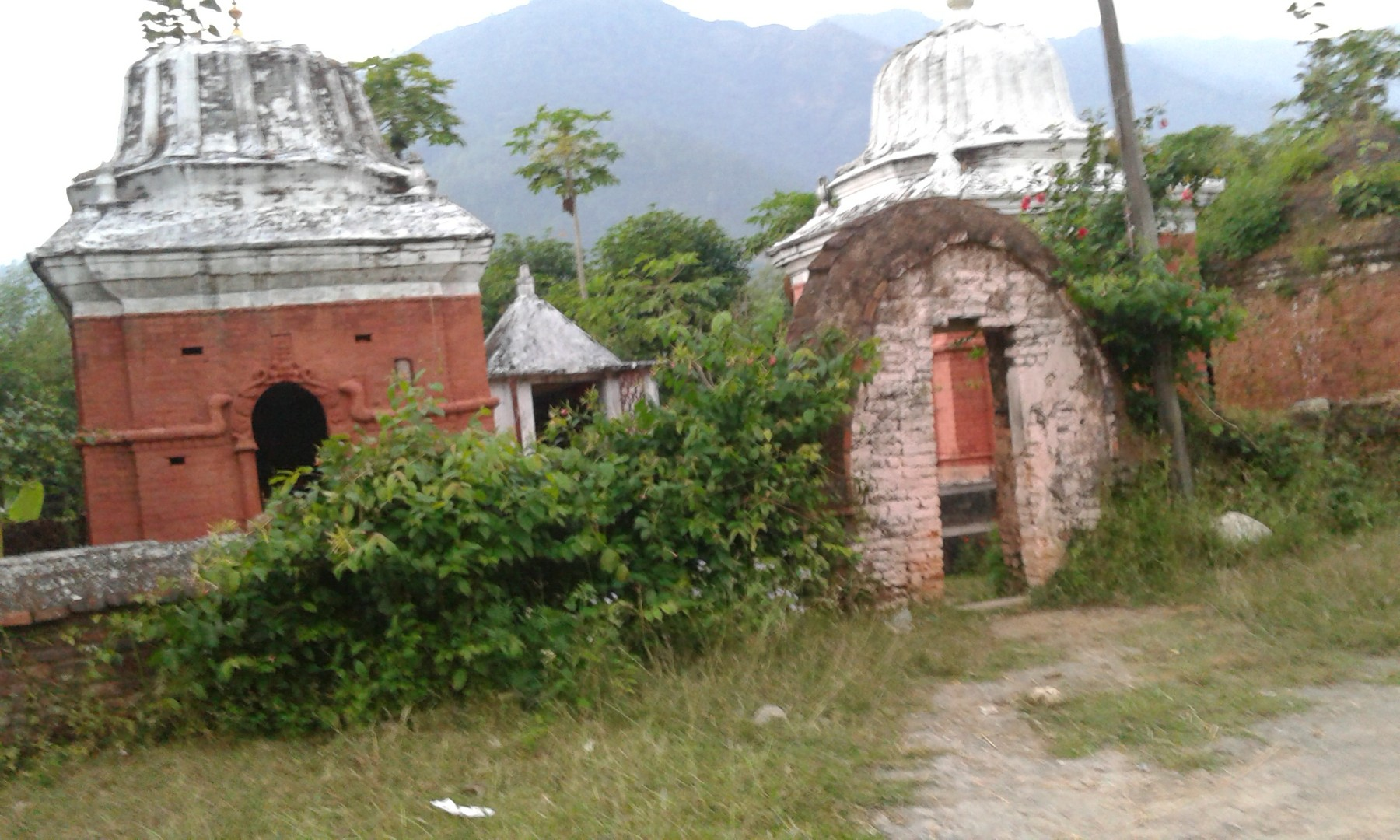
Shivalaya temple in Kalegaun

There are several temples in Kalegaun. Shivalaya temple in Kalegaun located at the side of Bheri River is famous in Jajarkot.

== See also ==
- List of monuments in Jajarkot, Nepal
