= Kolchaur, Jajarkot =

Kolchaur कोल्चौर
- Village
- Location in Nepal
- Coordinates: 28.7038°N 82.2313°E
- Country: Nepal
- Province: Karnali
- District: Jajarkot
- Municipality: Bheri
- Time zone: UTC+5:45 (NST)

Kolchaur (Nepali: कोल्चौर) is a village located in Bheri municipality in Jajarkot District of Karnali Province of Nepal. The aerial distance from Kolchaur to Nepal's capital Kathmandu is approximately 323 km.

== See also ==
- Bheri, Jajarkot
