= Badalek, Jajarkot =

Village in Karnali, Nepal

Badalek बडालेक
- Village
- Location in Nepal
- Coordinates: 28.7461°N 82.2539°E
- Country: Nepal
- Province: Karnali
- District: Jajarkot
- Municipality: Bheri
- Time zone: UTC+5:45 (NST)

Badalek (Nepali: बडालेक) is a village located in ward no. 1 of Nalgad municipality in Jajarkot District of Karnali Province of Nepal. The aerial distance from Badalek to Nepal's capital Kathmandu is approximately 323 km.

== See also ==
- Bheri, Jajarkot
