= Riththapani, Jajarkot =

Village in Karnali, Nepal

Riththapani रिठ्ठापानी
- Village
- Location in Nepal
- Coordinates: 28.7169°N 82.2231°E
- Country: Nepal
- Province: Karnali
- District: Jajarkot
- Municipality: Bheri
- Time zone: UTC+5:45 (NST)

Riththapani (Nepali: रिठ्ठापानी) is a village located in Bheri municipality in Jajarkot District of Karnali Province of Nepal. The aerial distance from Riththapani to Nepal's capital Kathmandu is approximately 324 km.
