= Shivalaya Rural Municipality =

Rural Municipality in Karnali Province, Nepal

Shivalaya Rural Municipality शिवालय गाउँपालिका
- Rural Municipality
- Location in Nepal
- Coordinates: 28.66°N 81.95°E
- Country: Nepal
- Province: Karnali Province
- District: Jajarkot
- Wards: 9
- Established: 10 March 2017

Government
  - Type: Rural Council
  - Chairperson: Mr. Narendra Kumar Shahi (NCP)
  - Vice-chairperson: Mrs. Kumari Thapa (NCP)

Area
  - Total: 134.26 km^{2} (51.84 sq mi)

Population (2011)
  - Total: 15,269
  - Density: 113.73/km^{2} (294.55/sq mi)
- Time zone: UTC+5:45 (NST)
- Headquarter: Sima
- Website: shibalayamun.gov.np

Shivalaya Rural Municipality (Nepali: शिवालय गाउँपालिका) is a rural municipality located in Jajarkot District of Karnali Province of Nepal.

According to Ministry of Federal Affairs and General Administration, Shivalaya has an area of 134.26 square kilometres (51.84 mi^{2}) and the total population of the rural municipality is 15,269 as of 2011 Nepal census.

Sima, Thala Raikar and Junga Thapachaur which previously were all separate Village development committees merged to form this new local level body. Fulfilling the requirement of the new Constitution of Nepal 2015, Ministry of Federal Affairs and General Administration replaced all old VDCs and Municipalities into 753 new local level bodies.

The rural municipality is divided into total 9 wards and the headquarters of this newly formed rural municipality is situated at Sima.

== Demographics ==
At the time of the 2011 Nepal census, Shivalaya Rural Municipality had a population of 15,269. Of these, 99.9% spoke Nepali and 0.1% other languages as their first language.

In terms of ethnicity/caste, 56.5% were Chhetri, 14.8% Kami, 11.7% Thakuri, 6.6% Hill Brahmin, 4.3% Damai/Dholi, 3.7% Magar, 0.9% Badi, 0.8% Sarki, 0.7% Dhobi and 0.1% others.

In terms of religion, 100.0% were Hindu.

In terms of literacy, 59.2% could read and write, 2.6% could only read and 38.2% could neither read nor write.
