= List of monuments in Karnali Province =

Karnali Province (Nepali: कर्णाली प्रदेश) is one of the seven federal provinces of Nepal established by the country's new constitution of 20 September 2015, comprising ten districts, namely, Dailekh, Dolpa, Humla, Jajarkot, Jumla, Kalikot, Mugu, Salyan, Surkhet and Western Rukum. This province is formerly known as Province No. 6, then as Karnali Pradesh. There are many categorized monuments sites in Karnali Province.

== Lists per district of Karnali Province ==
- List of monuments in Dailekh District
- List of monuments in Dolpa District
- List of monuments in Humla District
- List of monuments in Jajarkot District
- List of monuments in Jumla District
- List of monuments in Kalikot District
- List of monuments in Mugu District
- List of monuments in Salyan District
- List of monuments in Surkhet District
- List of monuments in Western Rukum District (see list of monuments in the former Rukum District)
