= Shakti Bahadur Basnet =

Nepalese politician (born 1969)

- शक्ति बहादुर बस्नेत
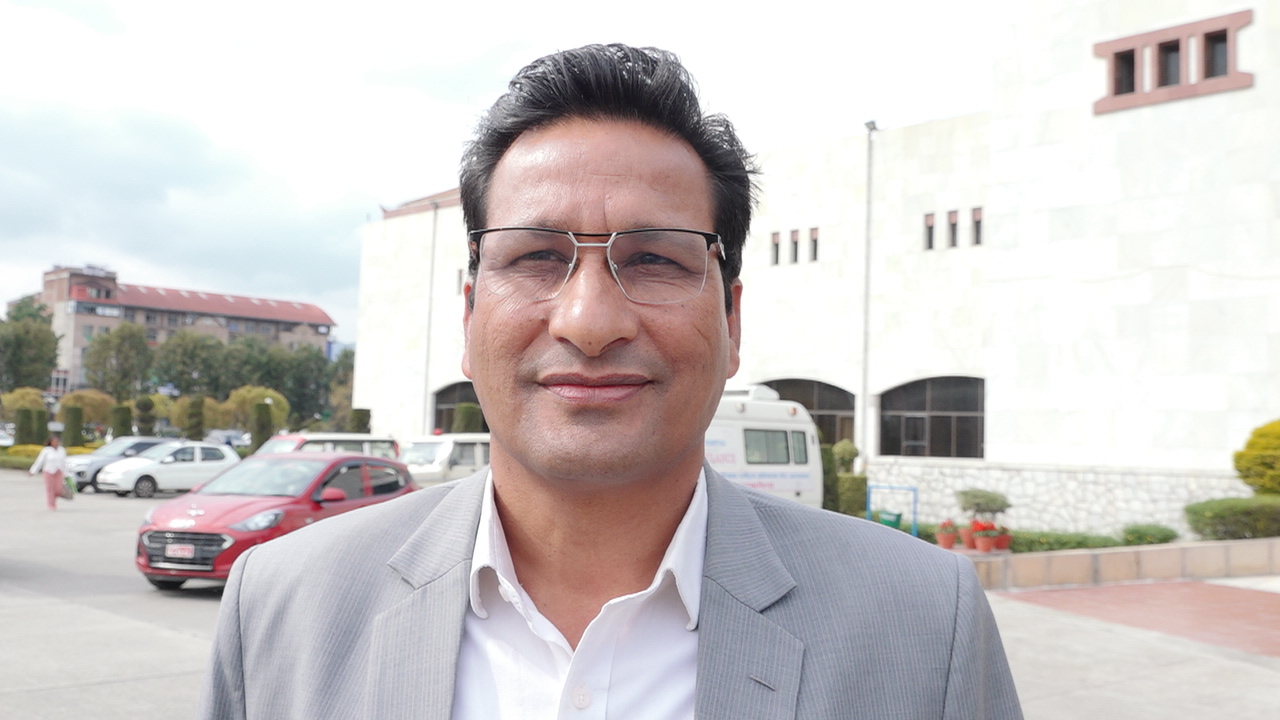
- Shakti Bahadur Basnet in 2018

Minister of Energy, Water Resources and Irrigation of Nepal
- In office 6 March 2024 – 15 July 2024
- President: Ram Chandra Paudel
- Prime Minister: Pushpa Kamal Dahal
- Vice President: Ram Sahaya Yadav
- Preceded by: Pushpa Kamal Dahal
- Succeeded by: Deepak Khadka
- In office 31 March 2023 – 4 March 2024
- President: Ram Chandra Paudel
- Prime Minister: Pushpa Kamal Dahal
- Vice President: Ram Sahaya Yadav
- Preceded by: Pushpa Kamal Dahal
- Succeeded by: Pushpa Kamal Dahal

Minister of Forest and Environment of Nepal
- In office 16 March 2018 – 25 December 2020
- President: Bidhya Devi Bhandari
- Prime Minister: Khadga Prasad Oli
- Preceded by: Bikram Pandey
- Succeeded by: Prem Ale

Minister of Home Affairs of Nepal
- In office 19 October 2015 – 4 August 2016
- President: Bidhya Devi Bhandari
- Prime Minister: Khadga Prasad Oli
- Preceded by: Bam Dev Gautam
- Succeeded by: Bimalendra Nidhi

Minister of Health and Population of Nepal
- In office 6 February 2011 – 29 August 2011
- President: Ram Baran Yadav
- Prime Minister: Jhala Nath Khanal
- Preceded by: Umakanta Chaudhari
- Succeeded by: Rajendra Mahato

Member of Parliament, Pratinidhi Sabha
- Incumbent
- Assumed office 4 March 2018
- Preceded by: Himself (as member of the Legislature Parliament)
- Constituency: Jajarkot 1

Member of Constituent Assembly
- In office 21 January 2014 – 14 October 2017
- Preceded by: Kali Bahadur Malla
- Succeeded by: Himself (as member of the House of Representatives)
- Constituency: Jajarkot 1

Personal details
- Born: 11 May 1969 (age 57) Kalegaun, Bheri, Jajarkot, Nepal
- Party: CPN (Maoist Centre)
- Other political affiliations: CPN (Mashal); CPN (Unity Centre)
- Spouse: Satya Pahadi
- Parents: Danda Bir Basnet (father); Dharma Kumari Basnet (mother)
- Nickname: Suresh Singh (Maoist guerrilla name)

Shakti Bahadur Basnet (Nepali: शक्ति बहादुर बस्नेत; born 11 May 1969) is a Nepalese politician and former Minister of Forest and Environment. He is a Central Committee Member of Nepal Communist Party. He served as Minister of Energy, Water Resources and Irrigation.

He served as Minister of Home Affairs. He inaugurated the campaign "Police My Friend". In December 2015, he had taken actions against the protesters hurling petrol bombs towards President Bidhya Bhandari at Janakpur, Nepal. PM KP Oli expressed discontent with him after he acted against the PM's instruction to stop the transfer of CDOs. He served as Minister of Health and Population under the prime minister Jhala Nath Khanal. He was elected in the 2017 Nepalese legislative election from Jajarkot district constituency number 1.

== Early years ==
In 1990, he began his active career into politics with alias Suresh Singh. In 1998, he was selected as Central Committee Member of UCPN Maoist.

== Family ==
He was born in Kalegaun, Jajarkot, Nepal to father Danda Bir Basnet and mother Dharma Kumari Basnet. He is married to fellow politician Satya Pahadi.

== See also ==
- List of Nepalese politicians
