= Lahai (disambiguation) =

Lahai is a 2023 album by Sampha.

Lahai may also refer to:

- Lahai, Kerala, a village in Kerala, India
- Lahai, Bheri Zone, a former village development committee in Bheri Zone, Nepal
