= Kalagaun =

Kalagaun may refer to:

- Kalagaun, Salyan
- Kalagaun, Achham

== See also ==
- Kalegaun
