= Maide =

Maide can refer to:

- Maide, Jajarkot, Nepal, a village
- Maide Arel (1907–1997), Turkish-Armenian painter
- Jaan Maide (1896–1945), Estonian military official

== See also ==
- Maid (disambiguation)
