= Ragda =

Ragda may refer to:

- Ragda pattice, popular Indian snack
- Ragda, Nepal
