= Rimna, Jajarkot =

Rimna रिम्‍ना
- Village
- Location in Nepal
- Coordinates: 28.6964°N 82.2748°E
- Country: Nepal
- Province: Karnali
- District: Jajarkot
- Municipality: Bheri
- Time zone: UTC+5:45 (NST)

Rimna (Nepali: रिम्‍ना) is a village located in Bheri municipality in Jajarkot District of Karnali Province of Nepal. The aerial distance from Rimna to Nepal's capital Kathmandu is approximately 319 km.

== See also ==
- Bheri, Jajarkot
