= Chandra Prakash Gharti =

Nepalese politician

- चन्द्र प्रकाश घर्ती

Mayor of Bheri municipality
- Incumbent
- Assumed office 2017

Personal details
- Born: 30 July 1981 (age 45) Bheri, Jajarkot, Nepal
- Party: CPN (UML) (before 2018; since 2021)
- Other political affiliations: NCP (2018–2021)
- Spouse: Sushma Thapa Magar
- Parents: Shyam Bahadur Gharti (father); Hastakali Gharti (mother)

Chandra Prakash Gharti (Nepali: चन्द्र प्रकाश घर्ती; born 30 July 1981), commonly known as CP Gharti is a Nepalese politician. He is the current Mayor of Bheri municipality in Jajarkot. He is a youth leader of CPN UML.

== See also ==
- List of Nepalese politicians
