= Maide, Jajarkot =

Village in Karnali, Nepal

Maide मैदे
- Village
- Location in Nepal
- Coordinates: 28.7201°N 82.2401°E
- Country: Nepal
- Province: Karnali
- District: Jajarkot
- Municipality: Bheri
- Time zone: UTC+5:45 (NST)

Maide (Nepali: मैदे) is a village located in Bheri municipality in Jajarkot District of Karnali Province of Nepal. The aerial distance from Maide to Nepal's capital Kathmandu is approximately 323 km.

== See also ==
- Bheri, Jajarkot
