= Bharatigaun =

City in Jajarkot District, Nepal

Bharatigaun is a city in Nepal, located in Jajarkot District. It has a population of approximately 500. The acting mayor of the town is Leela Kuari Bharati, a 68-year-old resident of the town.

== 2015 earthquake ==
13 deaths were reported here, all of the Bharati families.
