= List of monuments in Salyan, Nepal =

This is a list of monuments in Salyan District, Nepal as officially recognized by and available through the website of the Department of Archaeology, Nepal. Salyan is a district of Karnali Province and is located in midwestern Nepal.

== List of monuments ==
| ID | Name | Type | Location | District | Coordinates | Image |
|---|---|---|---|---|---|---|
| NP-SAL-01 | Phalabang Palace | | | Salyan | | Upload Photo Upload Photo |
| NP-SAL-02 | Kapurkot | | | Salyan | | Upload Photo Upload Photo |

== See also ==
- List of monuments in Karnali Province
- List of monuments in Nepal
