= Daha, Jajarkot =

Coordinates: 28°55′N 81°59′E

Daha दह
- Village Development Committee
- Interactive map of Daha
- Country: Nepal
- Zone: Bheri Zone
- District: Jajarkot District

Population (1991)
  - Total: 3,276
- Time zone: UTC+5:45 (Nepal Time)

Daha is a former village development committee in Jajarkot District in the Karnali Province of Nepal. At the time of the 1991 Nepal census it had a population of 3276 residing in 628 individual households.
