= Majhkot =

Coordinates: 28°49′N 81°57′E

Majhkot माझकोट
- Village development committee
- Interactive map of Majhkot
- Country: Nepal
- Zone: Bheri Zone
- District: Jajarkot District

Population (1991)
  - Total: 5,309
- Time zone: UTC+5:45 (Nepal Time)

Majhkot is a former village development committee in Jajarkot District in the Karnali Province of Nepal. At the time of the 1991 Nepal census it had a population of 5309 living in 1064 individual households.
