= List of monuments in Dolpa, Nepal =

This is a list of monuments in Dolpa District, Nepal as officially recognized by and available through the website of the Department of Archaeology, Nepal.

== List of monuments ==
ID	Name	Type	Location	District	Coordinates	Image
NP-DL-01	Rebumba Gumba			Dolpa		Upload Photo Upload Photo
NP-DL-02	Building of the King and Queen and findings			Dolpa		Upload Photo Upload Photo
NP-DL-03	Shri Bala Tripuasundari Devi Temple			Dolpa		Upload Photo Upload Photo
NP-DL-04	Mashto Bhavaniko Temple			Dolpa		Upload Photo Upload Photo
NP-DL-05	Bikram Shahi Maharajko Harikirtan Than			Dolpa		Upload Photo Upload Photo
NP-DL-06	Cholaorey Gumba			Dolpa		Upload Photo Upload Photo
NP-DL-07	Magad Gumba			Dolpa		Upload Photo Upload Photo
NP-DL-08	Thika Gumba			Dolpa		Upload Photo Upload Photo
NP-DL-09	Chandul Gumba (Thachinkola Gumba)			Dolpa		Upload Photo Upload Photo
NP-DL-10	Dhakar Gumba			Dolpa		Upload Photo Upload Photo
NP-DL-11	Vikramshahi Maharajko Dharwarka Bhagnavshesh			Dolpa		Upload Photo Upload Photo
NP-DL-12	Chaitya			Dolpa		Upload Photo Upload Photo

== See also ==
- List of monuments in Karnali Province
- List of monuments in Nepal
