= Jagatipur =

Jagatipur जगतीपुर
- Village development committee
- Location in Nepal
- Coordinates: 28.65°N 82.16°E
- Country: Nepal
- Zone: Bheri Zone
- District: Jajarkot District

Population (1991)
  - Total: 4,614
- Time zone: UTC+5:45 (Nepal Time)

Jagatipur is a former village development committee in Jajarkot District in the Karnali Province of Nepal. At the time of the 1991 Nepal census it had a population of 4614 living in 816 individual households.
