= Kortrang =

𝐊𝐨𝐫𝐭𝐚𝐧𝐠 कोर्ताङ
- Village development committee
- 𝐊𝐨𝐫𝐭𝐚𝐧𝐠
- Location in Nepal
- Coordinates: 28.87°N 81.97°E
- Country: Nepal
- Zone: Bheri Zone
- District: Jajarkot District

Population (1991)
  - Total: 2,558
- Time zone: UTC+5:45 (Nepal Time)

Kortang is a former village development committee in Jajarkot District in the Karnali Province of Nepal. At the time of the 1991 Nepal census it had a population of 2558.

== Kortang (कोर्ताङ) ==
- UN map of the municipalities of Jajarkot District
