= Punama =

Punama पुनमा
- Village development committee
- Location in Nepal
- Coordinates: 28.71°N 82.13°E
- Country: Nepal
- Zone: Bheri Zone
- District: Jajarkot District

Population (1991)
  - Total: 5,096
- Time zone: UTC+5:45 (Nepal Time)

Punama is a former village development committee in Jajarkot District in the Karnali Province of Nepal. At the time of the 1991 Nepal census it had a population of 5096 living in 890 individual households.
