= Dhime =

Dhime ढिमे
- Village development committee
- Location in Nepal
- Coordinates: 28.84°N 82.17°E
- Country: Nepal
- Zone: Bheri Zone
- District: Jajarkot District

Population (1991)
  - Total: 4,512
- Time zone: UTC+5:45 (Nepal Time)

Dhime is known for its natural scenery, which includes a jungle and a river. The river's flowing waters have the potential to be utilized for hydroelectric power; however, efforts to preserve the local habitat have limited development in this area. Some attribute the lack of resource exploitation to underdevelopment. Consequently, many of Dhime's natural resources remain largely unexplored for human use. Additionally, Dhime's inhabitants cultivate several varieties of rice, including a variety of Asian rice referred to as "palte" in the local language.
