= List of monuments in Kalikot, Nepal =

This is a list of monuments in Kalikot District, Nepal as officially recognized by and available through the website of the Department of Archaeology, Nepal.

== List of monuments ==
ID	Name	Type	Location	District	Coordinates	Image
NP-KLK-01	Dwideval			Kalikot		Upload Photo Upload Photo
NP-KLK-02	Khidkisenko Trideval			Kalikot		Upload Photo Upload Photo
NP-KLK-03	Deval (Trideval, Shikarshaili)			Kalikot		Upload Photo Upload Photo
NP-KLK-04	Panchdeval			Kalikot		Upload Photo Upload Photo
NP-KLK-05	Bhavani Temple			Kalikot		Upload Photo Upload Photo
NP-KLK-06	Stambh			Kalikot		Upload Photo Upload Photo
NP-KLK-07	Ek Deval			Kalikot		Upload Photo Upload Photo
NP-KLK-08	3 Vata Shilastambh			Kalikot		Upload Photo Upload Photo
NP-KLK-09	Stambh			Kalikot		Upload Photo Upload Photo
NP-KLK-10	Darhemashto Temple			Kalikot		Upload Photo Upload Photo
NP-KLK-11	Dhungedhara			Kalikot		Upload Photo Upload Photo
NP-KLK-12	Ganesh Murthi			Kalikot		Upload Photo Upload Photo
NP-KLK-13	Vishnu Murthi			Kalikot		Upload Photo Upload Photo
NP-KLK-14	Dwideval			Kalikot		Upload Photo Upload Photo
NP-KLK-15	Shivanath Temple			Kalikot		Upload Photo Upload Photo
NP-KLK-16	Jirna Dewal			Kalikot		Upload Photo Upload Photo
NP-KLK-17	Stone Tap			Kalikot		Upload Photo Upload Photo
NP-KLK-18	Panchdeval			Kalikot		Upload Photo Upload Photo
NP-KLK-19	Kali Temple and stone inscriptions			Kalikot		Upload Photo Upload Photo
NP-KLK-20	Jirna Dewal			Kalikot		Upload Photo Upload Photo
NP-KLK-21	Archive			Kalikot		Upload Photo Upload Photo
NP-KLK-22	Pillar Shahi Gela			Kalikot		Upload Photo Upload Photo
NP-KLK-23	Pillar Ramna			Kalikot		Upload Photo Upload Photo
NP-KLK-24	Gela Buddha Statue			Kalikot		Upload Photo Upload Photo
NP-KLK-25	Chilkhaya 2 stone inscriptions			Kalikot		Upload Photo Upload Photo

== See also ==
- List of monuments in Karnali Province
- List of monuments in Nepal
