= Talegaun =

Talegaun टालेगाउँ
- Village development committee
- Location in Nepal
- Coordinates: 28.83°N 82.10°E
- Country: Nepal
- Zone: Bheri Zone
- District: Jajarkot District

Population (1991)
  - Total: 2,608
- Time zone: UTC+5:45 (Nepal Time)

Talegaun is a former village development committee in Jajarkot District in the Karnali Province of Nepal. At the time of the 1991 Nepal census it had a population of 2608.
