= Junga Thapachaur =

Junga Thapachaur जुँगा थापाचौर
- Village development committee
- Location in Nepal
- Coordinates: 28.70°N 81.96°E
- Country: Nepal
- Zone: Bheri Zone
- District: Jajarkot District

Population (1991)
  - Total: 3,510
- Time zone: UTC+5:45 (Nepal Time)

Junga Thapachaur is a former village development committee in Jajarkot District in the Karnali Province of Nepal. At the time of the 1991 Nepal census it had a population of 3,510 living in 608 individual households.
