= Rokayagaun =

Rokayagaun रोकायागाउँ
- Village development committee
- Location in Nepal
- Coordinates: 29.02°N 82.18°E
- Country: Nepal
- Zone: Bheri Zone
- District: Jajarkot District

Population (1991)
  - Total: 2,364
- Time zone: UTC+5:45 (Nepal Time)

Rokayagaun is a former village development committee in Jajarkot District in the Karnali Province of Nepal. At the time of the 1991 Nepal census it had a population of 2364 living in 442 individual households.
