= Salma, Nepal =

Salma, Nepal साल्मा
- Village development committee
- Location in Nepal
- Coordinates: 28.73°N 81.94°E
- Country: Nepal
- Zone: Bheri Zone
- District: Jajarkot District

Population (1991)
  - Total: 4,575
- Time zone: UTC+5:45 (Nepal Time)

Salma is a former village development committee in Jajarkot District in the Karnali Province of Nepal. At the time of the 1991 Nepal census it had a population of 4575 people living in 834 individual households.
