= Jhapra =

Jhapra झाप्रा
- Village development committee
- Location in Nepal
- Coordinates: 28.76°N 82.11°E
- Country: Nepal
- Zone: Bheri Zone
- District: Jajarkot District

Population (1991)
  - Total: 3,403
- Time zone: UTC+5:45 (Nepal Time)

Jhapra is a former village development committee in Jajarkot District in the Karnali Province of Nepal. At the time of the 1991 Nepal census it had a population of 3403 living in 611 individual households.
