= List of monuments in Jumla, Nepal =

This is a list of monuments in Jumla District, Nepal as officially recognized by and available through the website of the Department of Archaeology, Nepal.

== List of monuments ==
ID	Name	Type	Location	District	Coordinates	Image
NP-JL-01	Baitak Mandap			Jumla		Upload Photo Upload Photo
NP-JL-02	Dwadasha Chaitya			Jumla		Upload Photo Upload Photo
NP-JL-03	Deval			Jumla		Upload Photo Upload Photo
NP-JL-04	Trideval			Jumla		Upload Photo Upload Photo
NP-JL-05	Bhairvanath Temple			Jumla		Upload Photo Upload Photo
NP-JL-06	Dhvideval			Jumla		Upload Photo Upload Photo
NP-JL-07	Remaining of Acharyali Dewal			Jumla		Upload Photo Upload Photo
NP-JL-08	Pillar			Jumla		Upload Photo Upload Photo
NP-JL-09	Stone Tap			Jumla		Upload Photo Upload Photo
NP-JL-10	Bhagn Devan			Jumla		Upload Photo Upload Photo
NP-JL-11	Kalika Temple			Jumla		Upload Photo Upload Photo
NP-JL-12	Dhapa Gawis 4 Ma Raheka Shilastambhharu			Jumla		Upload Photo Upload Photo
NP-JL-13	Dvideval			Jumla		Upload Photo Upload Photo
NP-JL-14	Virat Gawis 4 Ma Raheka Shilastambhharu			Jumla		Upload Photo Upload Photo
NP-JL-15	Shiv Temple			Jumla		Upload Photo Upload Photo
NP-JL-16	Kankasundari Temple			Jumla		Upload Photo Upload Photo
NP-JL-17	Bhagn Mandirrahru			Jumla		Upload Photo Upload Photo
NP-JL-18	Stone Pillars			Jumla		Upload Photo Upload Photo
NP-JL-19	Stone pillars of Talium			Jumla		Upload Photo Upload Photo
NP-JL-20	Archaeological Place			Jumla		Upload Photo Upload Photo

== See also ==
- List of monuments in Karnali Province
- List of monuments in Nepal
