= Khagenkot =

Khagenkot खगेनकोट
- Village development committee
- Location in Nepal
- Coordinates: 28.83°N 82.35°E
- Country: Nepal
- Zone: Bheri Zone
- District: Jajarkot District

Population (1991)
  - Total: 2,946
- Time zone: UTC+5:45 (Nepal Time)

Khagenkot is a former village development committee in Jajarkot District in the Karnali Province of Nepal. At the time of the 1991 Nepal census it had a population of 2946 living in 534 individual households.

== History ==
Khagenkot is a place with historical heritage in former Khagenkot G.B.S. Ward No.3 of Jajarkot district. Khagenkot is located in Nalgad Municipality Ward No. 7 of Jajarkot District under Karnali Province according to the federal structure. Around the 16th century, Gotamkot's paddy-growing area was completely destroyed by landslides. While going to Chitripatan as a herdsman for animal husbandry, Rishi's Eldest two sons saw the current place called Maide as a flat land and being so fascinated by the fertile and suitable land of Maide, he did not go home from Chitripatan. At the same time, Samal Banshi Jagde Ussaha of Jumla's Sinja Samarkot along with his limited army went to Tripurakot of Dolpa through this route. There is a legend that seeing the fertile land and suitable climate here, instead of going to Dolpa, he started running the state by making Khagenkot as the central capital of this region. It is understood that Gajendra Singh, Djelata, Kulendra Shahi, Masur Shahi etc. ruled after Jagdev in Khagenkot. Among these rulers, Gajendra Singh's name is in the forefront. During this time, various events took place. It is said that Churma Jaisi of Laha, Komal Jaisi of Samkot and Karna Jaisi of Maida sacrificed their bodies in the name of the then Khagenkot king and the king's family. Later, due to the curse of the arms that sacrificed their bodies, the Khagenkote kings demolished their own palace and carried the bricks of the palace to build a place in memory of the dead arms. The ruins of the palace can still be seen in Khagenkot, a historical tourist area which is very close to Radi Bazaar, the center of Nalgad municipality, center of Dalli, West Rukum. There is a custom of going to the temple premises. There is a custom of not allowing people from other places to worship in the temple of Mai Bhagavati. Once upon a time, the king of Khagankote was cursed by Churma Jaisi Laket in the name of Jajeman for mass murdering his brothers in Lah and committing that sin. It is said that due to the curse, the children of the king had to remove their arms from the metal and worship the ancestors and worship the ancestors. On the day of Ashtami, a goat is sacrificed at the hero's house and all the present devotees, without burning the weapons used by the king's soldiers, worship together in the Maulo in the temple of 6 Maibhagavati. On Maula, the entire pujaath is completed and a goat is sacrificed. On that day, it is celebrated happily in the belief that truth has won over falsehood. On the ninth day of Navadurga, along with Ramnabami, Khagenkot Shaktipith Bhagwati's Thana is a mandatory sacrifice. After the Bull (Male Buffalo) is sacrificed, a historic Khadonach is performed to celebrate the victory of truth over falsehood. On this day, a big fair is held here, and in the fair, they wear clothes that reflect their religion, culture, and tradition, and dance and sing hymns. On this occasion, these women have danced an endangered dance. In the multicultural Khagenkot, four or six families are Dalits, but the majority are Thakuris. The residents of this place consider Masto as their main deity, while Bhayar, Mahakal, and Saraswati are considered other deities. This place is not only rich in historical, cultural and religious aspects but also rich in tourism and nature. Various paranormal scenes can be seen around the palace area. It is believed that once two bulls fought in the palace fire without being separated. It is believed that the head of the bull was cut off by the king with a stone and even today, the bull can be seen in the form of a stone near the palace. It is believed that the stone that looks like a bull is actually a bull that was carved by the king.
