= Bhagawati Tol =

Coordinates: 28°55′N 82°30′E

Bhagawati Tol भगवतीटोल
- Village development committee
- Interactive map of Bhagawati Tol
- Country: Nepal
- Zone: Bheri Zone
- District: Jajarkot District

Population (1991)
  - Total: 2,247
- Time zone: UTC+5:45 (Nepal Time)

Bhagawati Tol is a former village development committee in Jajarkot District in the Karnali Province of Nepal. At the time of the 1991 Nepal census it had a population of 2247 living in 424 individual households.
