= Khalanga, Jajarkot =

Place in Karnali, Nepal

Khalanga खलङ्गा
- Neighborhood (HQ of Jajarkot District)
- Location in Nepal
- Coordinates: 28.73°N 82.22°E
- Country: Nepal
- Province: Karnali
- District: Jajarkot
- Municipality: Bheri

Population (1991)
  - Total: 8,140
- Time zone: UTC+5:45 (Nepal Time)

Khalanga (Nepali: खलङ्गा) is the Headquarters of the Jajarkot District located in Karnali province of Nepal. Formerly it was a village development committee which incorporated to Bheri Municipality in 2015 when a new municipality was established.

At the time of the 1991 Nepal census it had a population of 8140 living in 1533 individual households.

== Media ==
To Promote local culture Khalanga has two Community radio Station. One is Radio Hamro Paila FM - 87.9 MHz and another is Radio Khalanga F.M - 107.6 MHz.
