= Dasera =

Dasera दसेरा
- Village development committee
- Location in Nepal
- Coordinates: 28.75°N 82.00°E
- Country: Nepal
- Zone: Bheri Zone
- District: Jajarkot District

Population (1991)
  - Total: 5,725
- Time zone: UTC+5:45 (Nepal Time)

Dasera is a former village development committee in Jajarkot District in the Karnali Province of Nepal. At the time of the 1991 Nepal census it had a population of 5725 living in 1049 individual households.

Dasera VDC lies western part of Jajarkot District in Nepal. Thalaha Bazar is the main market.thi stragic incident became popular in India.

== Train Incident ==
On Friday evening 19 October 2018, the annual Dussehra festival ended in a tragedy in Amritsar, Punjab. Administrative negligence and public apathy towards safety took at least 60 lives and maimed many. Distracted revellers were standing on railway tracks watching the burning of Ravan's effigy in Punjab's Amritsar when the Jalandhar-Amritsar DMU train collided with them. Over 60 people were killed and 72 injured.
