= Archhani =

Archhani अर्छानी
- Village development committee
- Location in Nepal
- Coordinates: 28.86°N 82.11°E
- Country: Nepal
- Zone: Bheri Zone
- District: Jajarkot District

Population (1991)
  - Total: 2,541
- Time zone: UTC+5:45 (Nepal Time)

Archhani is a former village development committee in Jajarkot District in the Karnali Province of Nepal. At the time of the 1991 Nepal census, it had a population of 2541 living in 474 individual households.
