= List of monuments in Surkhet, Nepal =

This is a list of monuments in Surkhet District, Nepal as officially recognized by and available through the website of the Department of Archaeology, Nepal.

== List of monuments ==
| ID | Name | Type | Location | District | Coordinates | Image |
|---|---|---|---|---|---|---|
| NP-SK-01 | Padukasthan | | | Surkhet | | Upload Photo Upload Photo |
| NP-SK-02 | Shiva temple of Lati Koili | | | Surkhet | 28°33′33″N 81°33′49″E | Upload Photo Upload Photo |
| NP-SK-03 | Kakrebihar | | | Surkhet | 28°33′52″N 81°37′15″E | Kakrebihar Upload Photo |
| NP-SK-04 | Bayalkada Gadhi | | | Surkhet | 28°39′13″N 81°38′00″E | Upload Photo Upload Photo |
| NP-SK-05 | Khamba Gade (Shilastambha) Gadhi | | | Surkhet | | Upload Photo Upload Photo |
| NP-SK-06 | Shilasthambha of Birendra Municipality 9 | | | Surkhet | | Upload Photo Upload Photo |
| NP-SK-07 | Chowgan Chaur | | | Surkhet | | Upload Photo Upload Photo |

== See also ==
- List of monuments in Karnali Province
- List of monuments in Nepal
