= List of monuments in Humla, Nepal =

This is a list of monuments in Humla District, Nepal as officially recognized by and available through the website of the Department of Archaeology, Nepal.

== List of monuments ==
ID	Name	Type	Location	District	Coordinates	Image
NP-HL-01	Halji Renchiled Gumba (Kargyupa Sampradaay)			Humla		Halji Renchiled Gumba (Kargyupa Sampradaay) Upload Photo
NP-HL-02	Khapurnath Temple		Kharpunath	Humla		Upload Photo Upload Photo
NP-HL-03	Chimik Gumba			Humla		Upload Photo Upload Photo
NP-HL-04	Nyotad Gumba			Humla		Upload Photo Upload Photo
NP-HL-05	Mashta Maad			Humla		Upload Photo Upload Photo
NP-HL-06	Kunjuma Gumba			Humla		Upload Photo Upload Photo
NP-HL-07	Tungar Chyojong Gumba			Humla		Upload Photo Upload Photo
NP-HL-08	Ralling Gumba			Humla		Ralling Gumba Upload Photo

== See also ==
- List of monuments in Karnali Province
- List of monuments in Nepal
