= List of monuments in Mugu, Nepal =

This is a list of monuments in Mugu District, Nepal as officially recognized by and available through the website of the Department of Archaeology, Nepal.

== List of monuments ==
ID	Name	Type	Location	District	Coordinates	Image
NP-MU-01	Bachanbolne Gumba			Mugu		Upload Photo Upload Photo
NP-MU-02	Dulleli Mai Temple			Mugu		Upload Photo Upload Photo
NP-MU-03	Rara Mahadev			Mugu		Upload Photo Upload Photo
NP-MU-04	Tharpa Masta			Mugu		Upload Photo Upload Photo
NP-MU-05	Lochhok Tasi Gumba			Mugu		Upload Photo Upload Photo
NP-MU-06	Serok Saptik Chhoiling Gumba			Mugu		Upload Photo Upload Photo
NP-MU-07	Daura Gumba			Mugu		Upload Photo Upload Photo
NP-MU-08	Chattai Gumba			Mugu		Upload Photo Upload Photo
NP-MU-09	Kartipema chekorling gumba			Mugu		Upload Photo Upload Photo

== See also ==
- List of monuments in Karnali Province
- List of monuments in Nepal
