= List of monuments in Dailekh, Nepal =

This is a list of monuments in Dailekh District, Nepal as officially recognized by and available through the website of the Department of Archaeology, Nepal.

== List of monuments ==
ID	Name	Type	Location	District	Coordinates	Image
NP-DK-01	Kafalla Mashto Paik			Dailekh		Upload Photo Upload Photo
NP-DK-02	Bhurtika Devals			Dailekh		Bhurtika Devals Upload Photo
NP-DK-03	Rawatkot's Panchadeval			Dailekh		Upload Photo Upload Photo
NP-DK-04	Pathar Nauli (Dullu)			Dailekh		Upload Photo Upload Photo
NP-DK-05	Prithivi Malla's Kirtistambha (Dullu)			Dailekh		Prithivi Malla's Kirtistambha (Dullu) Upload Photo
NP-DK-06	Dharma Gadhi			Dailekh		Dharma Gadhi Upload Photo
NP-DK-07	Ruins of Ancient Ruins of Dullu			Dailekh		Ruins of Ancient Ruins of Dullu Upload Photo
NP-DK-08	Kot Killa			Dailekh		Upload Photo Upload Photo
NP-DK-09	Charkhamba (Chaturstambha)			Dailekh		Charkhamba (Chaturstambha) Upload Photo
NP-DK-10	Narayan Mandir			Dailekh		Narayan Mandir Upload Photo
NP-DK-11	Batuk Bhairav ??Temple			Dailekh		Batuk Bhairav ??Temple Upload Photo
NP-DK-12	Bhairav ??temple of Vilaspur			Dailekh		Bhairav ??temple of Vilaspur Upload Photo
NP-DK-13	Seven poles			Dailekh		Upload Photo Upload Photo
NP-DK-14	Tiyadithan			Dailekh		Tiyadithan Upload Photo
NP-DK-15	Kajijasapau Thapako Pauwa			Dailekh		Kajijasapau Thapako Pauwa Upload Photo
NP-DK-16	Siddheshwar Mahadev (Dungeshwar)			Dailekh		Siddheshwar Mahadev (Dungeshwar) Upload Photo
NP-DK-17	Temple of Vindrashaini			Dailekh		Temple of Vindrashaini Upload Photo
NP-DK-18	Shirsthan (Jwaladevi) Math			Dailekh		Upload Photo Upload Photo
NP-DK-19	Nabhisthan			Dailekh		Upload Photo Upload Photo
NP-DK-20	Dhuleshhwar			Dailekh		Dhuleshhwar Upload Photo
NP-DK-21	Padukasthan			Dailekh		Padukasthan Upload Photo
NP-DK-22	Kotilasthan			Dailekh		Upload Photo Upload Photo

== See also ==
- List of monuments in Karnali Province
- List of monuments in Nepal
