= Ragda, Nepal =

Ragda, Nepal रागदा
- Village development committee
- Location in Nepal
- Coordinates: 28.93°N 82.44°E
- Country: Nepal
- Zone: Bheri Zone
- District: Jajarkot District

Population (1991)
  - Total: 2,902
- Time zone: UTC+5:45 (Nepal Time)

Ragda is a former village development committee in Jajarkot District in the Karnali Province of Nepal. At the time of the 1991 Nepal census it had a population of 2902 people living in 522 individual households.
