= List of monuments in Jajarkot, Nepal =

This is a list of monuments in Jajarkot District, Nepal, as officially recognized by and listed on the website of the Department of Archaeology, Nepal.

== List of monuments ==
| ID | Name | Type | Location | District | Coordinates | Image |
|---|---|---|---|---|---|---|
| NP-JJ-01 | Group of thirteen Chyortens | | | Jajarkot | | Upload Photo Upload Photo |
| NP-JJ-02 | Shiva Temple | | | Jajarkot | | Upload Photo Upload Photo |
| NP-JJ-03 | Bharmashto Dhime | | | Jajarkot | | Upload Photo Upload Photo |
| NP-JJ-04 | Jajarkot Darbar Vestiges | | | Jajarkot | | Upload Photo Upload Photo |
| NP-JJ-05 | Jagatipur Darwar's Ruins | | | Jajarkot | | Upload Photo Upload Photo |
| NP-JJ-06 | Shiwalayas of Kalegaun | | | Jajarkot | | Shiwalayas of Kalegaun Upload Photo |
| NP-JJ-07 | Kalika Temple | | | Jajarkot | | Upload Photo Upload Photo |
| NP-JJ-08 | Saru Mastho Paik | | | Jajarkot | | Upload Photo Upload Photo |
| NP-JJ-09 | Jajarkot Palace | | | Jajarkot | | Upload Photo Upload Photo |

== See also ==
- List of monuments in Karnali Province
- List of monuments in Nepal
