= Bheri, Jajarkot =

Municipality in Karnali, Nepal

Bheri भेरी
- Municipality नगरपालिका
- Location in Nepal
- Coordinates: 28.73°N 82.22°E
- Country: Nepal
- Province: Karnali
- District: Jajarkot
- Established: 19 September 2015

Government
  - Type: Mayor-council
  - Mayor: Chandra Prakash Gharti (NCP)
  - Deputy mayor: Bhabna Bhandari (NCP)

Area
  - Total: 219.77 km^{2} (84.85 sq mi)

Population (2011)
  - Total: 33,515
  - Density: 152.50/km^{2} (394.97/sq mi)
- Time zone: UTC+5:45 (NST)
- Website: official website

Bheri (Nepali: भेरी) (earlier; Bheri Malika) is an urban municipality located in Jajarkot District of Karnali Province of Nepal.

The total area of the municipality is 219.77 square kilometres (84.85 sq mi) and the total population of the municipality as of 2011 Nepal census is 33,515 individuals. The municipality is divided into total 13 wards.

The municipality was established on 19 September 2015 merging Khalanga, Punama, Bhur and Jagatipur Village development committee.

No changes were made in this municipality on 10 March 2017, when Government of Nepal restricted old administrative structure and announced 744 local level units as per the new constitution of Nepal 2015.

== Demographics ==
At the time of the 2011 Nepal census, Bheri Municipality had a population of 34,713. 99.9% of these spoke Nepali as their first language.

In terms of ethnicity/caste, 30.4% were Chhetri, 27.8% Kami, 16.9% Thakuri, 13.8% Magar, 3.8% Hill Brahmin, 2.8% Damai/Dholi, 1.6% Sanyasi/Dasnami, 0.7% Newar, 0.5% Badi, 0.4% Gaine, 0.3% Sarki, 0.3% Raji, 0.2% other Terai, 0.2% Chamar/Harijan/Ram, 0.1% Tharu and 0.1% others.

In terms of religion, 99.2% were Hindu and 0.8% Christian.

In terms of literacy, 60.5% could read and write, 3.2% could only read and 36.3% could neither read nor write.
