= Jajarkot District =

District in Karnali province, Nepal

Coordinates: 28.7°N 82.2333°E

Jajarkot
- District
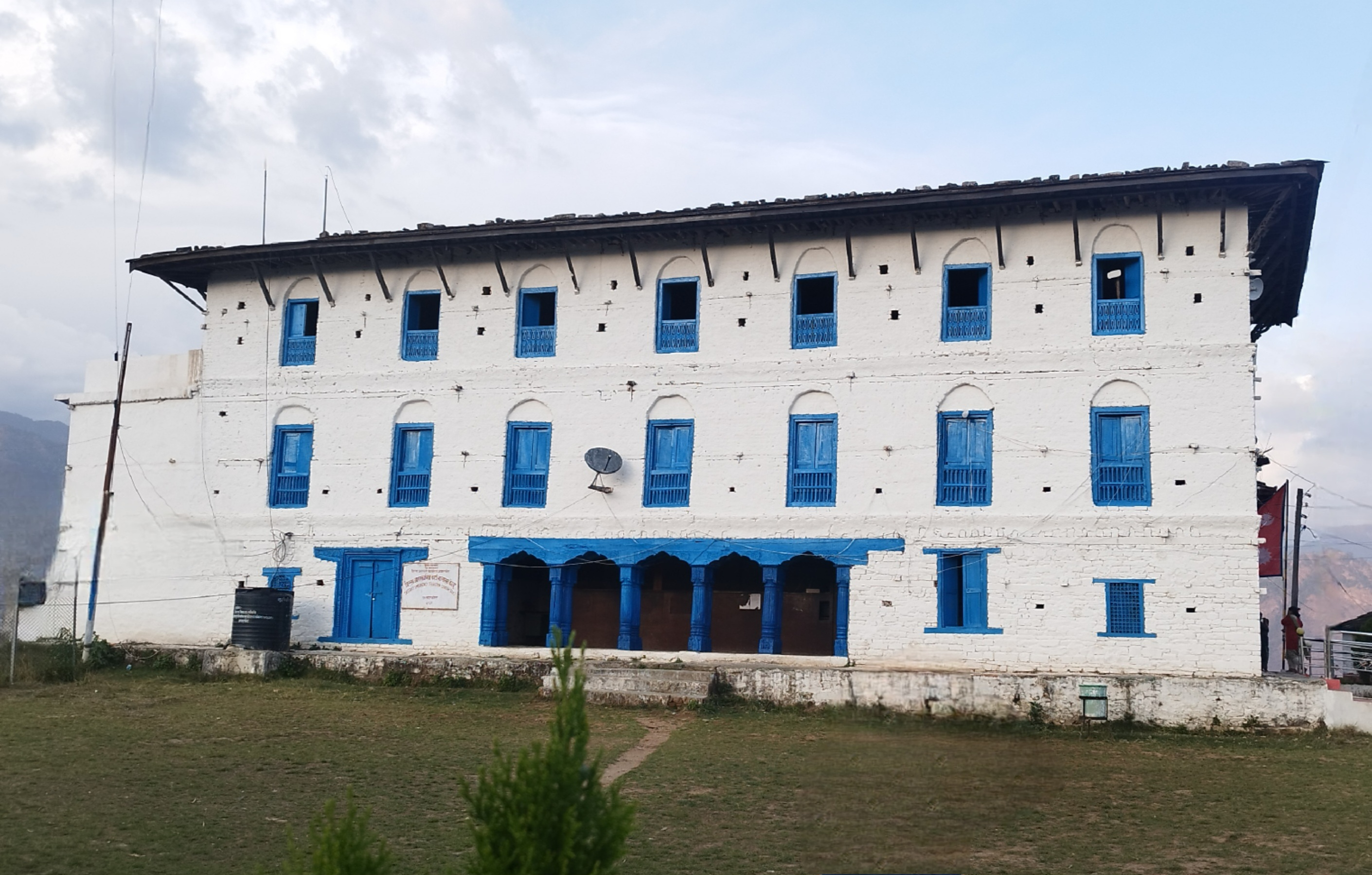
- Jajarkot Durbar

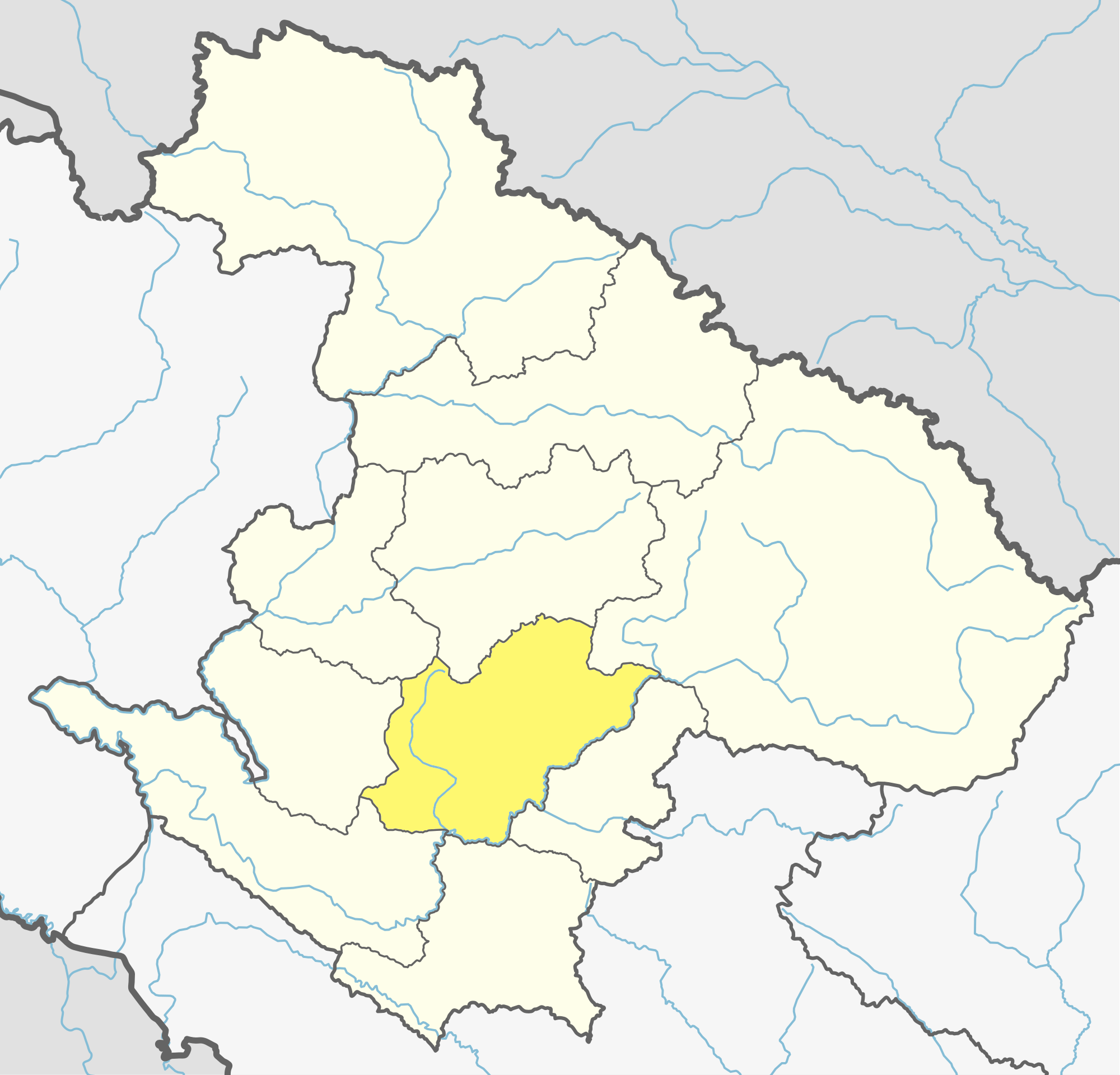
- Location of Jajarkot District (dark yellow) in Karnali
- Country: Nepal
- Established: 2016
- Admin HQ.: Khalanga

Government
  - Type: Coordination committee
  - Body: DCC, Jajarkot

Area
  - Total: 2,230 km^{2} (860 sq mi)

Population (2011)
  - Total: 171,304
  - Density: 76.8/km^{2} (199/sq mi)
- Time zone: UTC+05:45 (NPT)
- Website: ddcjajarkot.gov.np

Jajarkot District (Nepali: जाजरकोट जिल्ला) a part of Karnali Province, is one of the seventy-seven districts of Nepal. The district, with Khalanga as its district headquarters, covers an area of 2,230 km^{2} (860 sq mi) and has a population of 171,304 in 2011 Nepal census.

== Introduction ==
Jajarkot is one of the districts of Karnali Province in Nepal. Khalanga is its headquarters. It has 3 municipalities and 4 rural municipalities.

== Geography and Climate ==
Climate Zone	Elevation Range	% of Area
Upper Tropical	300 to 1,000 meters 1,000 to 3,300 ft.	5.9%
Subtropical	1,000 to 2,000 meters 3,300 to 6,600 ft.	37.3%
Temperate	2,000 to 3,000 meters 6,400 to 9,800 ft.	34.6%
Subalpine	3,000 to 4,000 meters 9,800 to 13,100 ft.	16.9%
Alpine	4,000 to 5,000 meters 13,100 to 16,400 ft.	2.3%
Nival	above 5,000 meters	3.0%

== Demographics ==
Historical population
Census year	Pop.	±% p.a.
1981	99,312	—
1991	113,958	+1.39%
2001	134,868	+1.70%
2011	171,304	+2.42%
2021	189,365	+1.01%
Source: Citypopulation

At the time of the 2021 Nepal census, Jajarkot District had a population of 189,360. 11.41% of the population is under 5 years of age. It has a literacy rate of 75.50% and a sex ratio of 1013 females per 1000 males. 104,691 (55.29%) lived in municipalities.

Castes/ethnic groups in Jajarkot district (2021)
1. Chhetri (39.3%)
2. Kami (22.6%)
3. Thakuri (16.2%)
4. Magar (8.94%)
5. Bahun (4.50%)
6. Damai (3.93%)
7. Sarki (2.07%)
8. Dasnami (1.08%)
9. Others (1.32%)

Khas people make up a majority of the population with 90% of the population. Chhetris form 39% of the population, while Khas Dalits make up 29% of the population. Magars make up 9% of the population.

At the time of the 2021 census, 98.35% of the population spoke Nepali as their first language. In 2011, 99.1% of the population spoke Nepali as their first language.

Religion in Jajarkot District (2021)
Religion	Percent
Hinduism	98.65%
Christianity	0.93%
Other or not stated	0.42%

== Divisions ==
=== Municipalities ===
Name	Nepali	Population (2011)	Area (km^{2})	Density
Bheri	भेरी	33,515	219.77	153
Chhedagad	छेडागाड	35,295	284.20	124
Tribeni Nalgad	त्रिवेणी नलगाड	25,597	387.44	66

=== Rural municipalities ===
Name	Nepali	Population (2011)	Area (km^{2})	Density
Junichande	जुनीचाँदे	21,733	346.21	63
Kushe	कुशे	20,621	273.97	75
Barekot	बारेकोट	18,083	577.5	31
Shivalaya	शिवालय	15,269	134.26	114

== Towns and villages ==
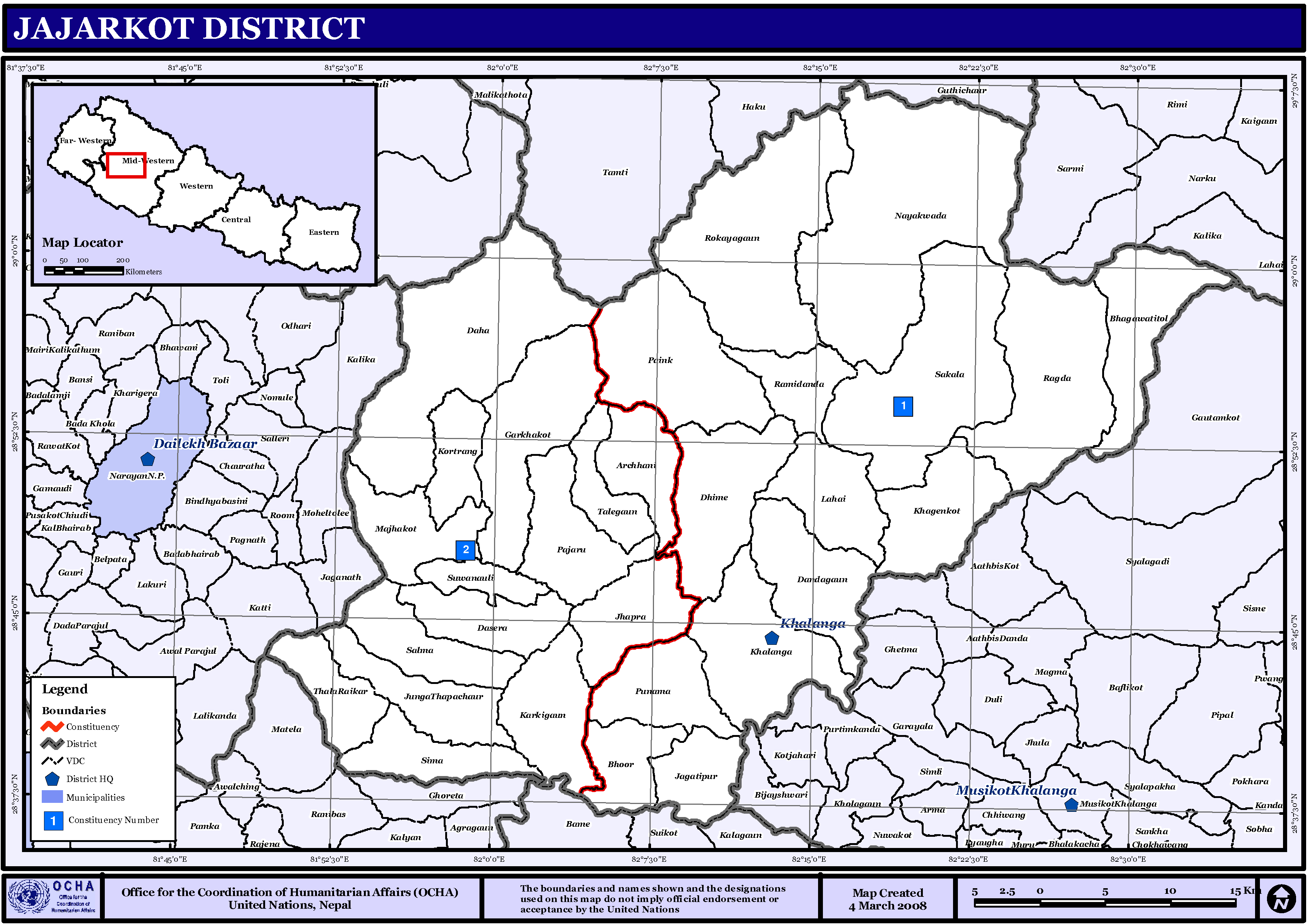
Map of the VDCs in Jajarkot District

- Archhani
- Bhagawati Tol
- Bharatigaun
- Bheri
- Bhur
- Daha
- Dandagaun
- Dasera
- Dhime
- Garkhakot
- Jagatipur
- Jhapra
- Junga Thapachaur
- Karkigaun
- Khagenkot
- Khalanga
- Kortrang
- Lahai
- Majhkot
- Nayakwada
- Paink
- Pajaru
- Punama
- Ragda
- Ramidanda
- Rokayagaun
- Sakala
- Salma
- Sima
- Suwanauli
- Talegaun
- Thala Raikar

== Notable people ==
- Ratna Prashad Sharma Neupane Social worker and Leader of Communist Party of Nepal (Unified Marxist–Leninist), member of Legislature Parliament 1999
- Shakti Bahadur Basnet Leader of Nepal Communist Party
- Rajeev Bikram Shah Leader of Nepali Congress
- Dambar Bahadur Singh Central committee member and Leader of Nepal Communist Party CPN UML

== See also ==
- List of Monuments in Jajarkot District
- Zones of Nepal (Former)
