= Lakhandra =

Coordinates: 28°59′N 81°33′E

Lakhandra लखान्द्रा
- Village development committee
- Interactive map of Lakhandra
- Country: Nepal
- Zone: Bheri Zone
- District: Dailekh District

Population (1991)
  - Total: 3,479
- Time zone: UTC+5:45 (Nepal Time)

Lakhandra is a village development committee in Dailekh District in the Bheri Zone of western-central Nepal. At the time of the 1991 Nepal census it had a population of 3479 people living in 591 individual households.
